= Martha Davis Coe =

American composer and musician

- Coe from a 1953 newspaper
- Born: Martha Laysa Davis; April 24, 1907; New York, USA
- Died: November 26, 1986; New Jersey, USA
- Occupations: Composer, musician
- Partner: Alice White
- Writing career
- Pen name: Martha Coe
- Language: English

Martha Davis Coe (April 24, 1907 – November 11, 1986) was a musician, composer, PR executive and inventor. She was on the staff of Girl Scouts of the USA (GSUSA) for ten years.

== Personal life ==
Martha Laysa Davis was the second child of Bret C. Davis and May W. Davis (née Wheeler). She married Arthur Clinch Coe (1905–1999) on July 1, 1939. They separated some time before 1946. She met her partner, Alicen White (1908–2007), an author and playwright, while they were both working for the GSUSA. They lived together in New York City until 1971, when they moved to Rumson, New Jersey.

== Professional life ==
Coe had a varied working life, dividing her time between composing, performing, theatre management, public relations, Girl Scouts, TV and radio.

She was an executive director for the Women's Army Corps in World War II, Executive Secretary for the American Women's Association and for 10 years was the executive director for the Argus Archives for the humane treatment of animals.

She was Public Relations Director for Cabrini Medical Center and Public Relations and Business Manager for the New England Repertory Theatre, Martha’s Vineyard. For ten years she was assistant to the GSUSA’s Director of Public Relations.

=== Radio, TV, Music and Theatre ===
In the 1940s she was an Assistant Research Director for radio station WOR, leaving to become the Music Program Director in charge of all live and recorded music programs for radio station WMCA in 1945. She also worked on early television programmes at the DuMont Television Network.

She had her own music studio in New York City for several years and was a composer and concert pianist with wide experience in theatre operation and productions in New York and Summer Stock.

For GSUSA, she directed A Dream and a Promise as part of the 1953 National Council in Cincinnati, Ohio for an audience of 3,000. In 1956 she produced three large-scale arena events for the first Girl Scout Senior Roundup in Highland State Park, Michigan. The first pageant included a military flyover and guest speaker Charlton Heston. The third pageant was written by Dorothy Fields.

Between 1976 and 1986 Coe and White wrote, produced and performed two-woman shows Music Hall Favourites and Oscar Wilde and Wonderful as Coe-White Associates, appearing in New York and New Jersey.

== Works ==
=== Musical Plays and Songs ===
Coe wrote the music for four musical plays, with book and/or lyrics by White:

- Quite A Young Girl(1960) Coe and White, together with lyricist Peter Colonna, wrote the two-act musical comedy Quite A Young Girl, with a libretto taken from 9-year old Daisy Ashford’s best-selling novel The Young Visiters (1919). Several playwrights had previously attempted to adapt the novel for the stage, but none of their efforts was deemed acceptable by the author. Coe and White’s version was reported to have received the author’s blessing, but they ultimately failed to find a producer.
- The Absent Minded Dragon (1963) book by James Truax and musical director Anne McLarnon. It appeared at Stage 73, off-Broadway and ran for almost three years. The cast included Robert Campuzano, Ruth Coleman and Al Kavanagh.
- The Brownies (1964) a dramatized musical inspired by Juliana H Ewing’s story of the same name from 1865. It appeared at the Renata Theatre, New York. and recorded on an LP.
- The Enchanted Forest (1964)

Standalone songs include:

- He Was Just a Gambling Man (1945) words by Joseph Creamer and Lenore Hershey
- The Road Winds Upwards (1959) words Ann Roos, written for the 1959 Girl Scout Senior Roundup at Colorado Springs, CO
- My World in You (1959) words by Alicen White
- Until You Said Goodbye (1959) words by Alicen White

She also wrote the orchestral work Paul Bunyan Fantasy or Old Paul and his Blue Ox, Babe (1946) recorded by the National Orchestral Association

=== Scripts and Publications ===
- Conservation Quiz (1949), a radio play to celebrate the birthday of GSUSA.
- The Last Train Out (1962) a screenplay, written with Mary Jean Parson, Susan Wayne and Alicen White
- A Bouquet of Poems, Selected and Arranged for Choral Speaking (1966) illustrated by Martha Coe. It included a 33.3 rpm record narrated by Joel Templeton.
- Brownies’ Own Songbook (1968) with music by Martha Coe. It sold over 150,000 copies

=== Inventions ===
In 1961, Coe and White established May White Corporation, through which they developed and sold Grandmother’s Favourite Furniture Cream, based on a recipe from White’ s mother, and Wurry Beads, Lucite imitations of Worry beads.

In 1980, Coe filed a patent for a walker with detachable seat.
