= General Malcolm =

General Malcolm may refer to:

- George Malcolm (Indian Army officer) (1818–1897), British Indian Army general
- George Alexander Malcolm (1810–1888), British Army general
- John Malcolm (1769–1833), Madras Army major general
- Neill Malcolm (1869–1953), British Army major general
