= Angela Thompson =

British Girl Guide executive

- Thompson from a 1955 issue of The Guider
- Born: Angela Ayscough Thompson; 28 August 1896; Potters Bar, Middlesex, England
- Died: 24 November 1954 (aged 58); Burcot, Worcestershire, England
- Occupation: Girl Guide executive

Angela Ayscough Thompson (Note: Her surname sometimes appeared as just Thompson) (28 August 1896 – 24 November 1954) was a Girl Guide Association (GGA) executive. She was the first chair of the GGA's religious panel, and international head of camping during WWII. She received the Silver Fish Award, the Girl Guiding movement's highest adult honour.

== Personal life and education ==
Thompson was the third child of Henry Asycough Thompson, a wholesale druggist, and Annie Thompson. She worked at Little Heath Church, Hertfordshire. In later years she lived in Burcot, Worcestershire where she attended All Saints Church, Bromsgrove and was vice-chair of the church council. She died after falling off her scooter while on her way to communion. A memorial service was held for her at St Michael's Church, Chester Square, London.

== Girl Guides ==
Thompson joined the Girl Guide movement as a Brownie leader in Little Heath, Hertfordshire, where she later worked as a Guide leader and commissioner. During WWII she served as the movement's international head of camping. She received the Silver Fish Award in 1945. She was chair of the publications department and in 1951 joined the executive committee and council. Thompson was the first chair of the religious panel of the GGA, a position she held until her death.
