= Dorothea Powell =

British Girl Guide executive (1897–1986)

- Born: Dorothea Mary Powell; 9 April 1897; Kensington, Middlesex, England
- Died: 2 September 1986 (aged 89); Hove, England
- Other name: Dot
- Occupation: Teacher
- Partner: Jane Mervyn Newnham

Dorothea Mary Powell JP (9 April 1897 – 2 September 1986) was a Girl Guide Association (GGA) executive. She was chair of the GGA education panel from 1950 to 1952 and in 1952 received the Silver Fish Award, the Girlguiding movement's highest adult honour. She was Girl Guide commissioner for both Rangers and for schools in England.

== Personal life ==
Dorothea Mary Powell was born to Edward Cotton Powell (1846 – 1922), a solicitor, and Anne Caroline Powell, née Ingram (1866 – 1940). Dorothea had six siblings, including a twin, Thomas, who was killed in WWII. She was a distant relative of Robert Baden-Powell, the co-founder of the Girl Guide movement.

Powell grew up on the Sussex Downs. She attended Queen Anne's School, Caversham and was due to attend Oxford University but instead, she served in the Voluntary Aid Detachment (VAD) for three years during WWI.

Powell represented Sussex and the south of England at lacrosse. She became a teacher at Tudor Hall School, Chislehurst. She moved to Hove where she worked in social service and as a justice of the peace.

From the 1950s she lived with Jane Mervyn Newnham, OBE initially together with fellow Guider Mary Cuningham Chater in Littlehampton, and from around 1955 onwards in Southwick, West Sussex.

== Girl Guides ==
Powell was Lieutenant at 2nd Caversham Girl Guide Company in 1918. Two years later, while teaching at Tudor Hall School, she joined the school's Guide Company. After moving to Hove she held various roles, including Brown Owl, Guide captain, Cadet captain of Roedean School, Ranger captain, district and division commissioner. She was also county secretary and on the executive committee of the county headquarters.

At a national level she was Girl Guide Commissioner for schools and colleges and chair of the GGA's education panel. She was awarded the Silver Fish in 1952. From 1953 to 1955, she spent two years with Newnham on a training tour of Southern Rhodesia and South Africa. In 1960 she joined the newly-formed Trefoil Guild in Worthing.

Internationally, Powell represented Great Britain at a Guide camp in Finland, attended a Guide and Scout cruise around the Mediterranean, ran leader training in Sudan and Southern Rhodesia and represented the Trefoil Guild at a conference in Denmark.

== Other ==
In 1962 Powell was elected honorary treasurer of the Worthing Labour Party.
