= Alice White (writer) =

British-American author and playwright

- Alicen White, from a 1973 newspaper
- Born: Alice Margaret Geddes White; 28 April 1908; Carnoustie, Scotland
- Died: 3 August 2007 (aged 99); Rumson, New Jersey, U.S.
- Citizenship: American
- Education: University of British Columbia; Smith College; Columbia University
- Occupations: Author, playwright
- Partner: Martha Davis Coe
- Writing career
- Pen name: Alicen White
- Language: English
- Genres: Gothic romance Children; Girl scouting

Alice White (28 April 1908 – 3 August 2007), also known as Alicen White, was a British-American writer, playwright, editor, teacher and performer. She was on the staff of Girl Scouts of the USA for over 25 years.

== Early life and education ==
Alice Margaret Geddes White was born in Carnoustie, Scotland on 28 April 1908 to John Hermann White, owner of Dundee Flour Mills and Mary White of Providence, RI. She attended the High School of Dundee between 1918 and 1924 until her father's business closed when White was 16 years old. The family moved to Vancouver, Canada, where she attended King George Secondary School. She gained a bachelor's degree from the University of British Columbia in 1929, having supported herself with several scholarships, including the University Scholarship for 1930–1931. She earned a master's degree in English literature from Smith College, Massachusetts, then went on to further graduate studies at Columbia University, New York. She studied acting at the Everyman Theatre School in London, in Vancouver and with Gene Frankel in New York.

== Personal life ==
White became a naturalized American on 26 July 1943. She met her partner, Martha Davis Coe (1907–1986), an entertainment producer and composer for TV, while they were both working for the GSUSA. They lived together in New York City until 1971, when they moved to Rumson, New Jersey. White was a member of the Monmouth County Chapter of Zonta International. She moved to King James Nursing Home, New Jersey in old age.

== Work ==
Between 1930 and 1934, White taught English and dramatics at Mary C. Wheeler School in Providence, RI. Working with fellow teacher Janet E Tobitt, she published her first book, One Act Trips Abroad in 1931. They would go on to write four books together. She taught English and dramatics at Greenwich Academy, CN from 1938 to 1941. In 1941, White and Tobitt taught intensive folk-dance and dramatics courses at Purdue University, Indiana.

In 1943, White joined the American Red Cross as an assistant Program Director. She was stationed in Capri, Italy, Germany, England and North Africa. From 1947 – 1948 she taught at the University of Kentucky. She worked for the US Government's Information and Education Department in Germany and England, returning to the US in 1953.

In 1961, White and Coe established May White Corporation, through which they developed and sold Grandmother’s Favourite Furniture Cream, based on a recipe from White's mother, and Wurry Beads, Lucite imitations of Worry beads.

She was a member of the Paravent Theatrical Company in Providence, RI and performed in several off-Broadway theatre productions in New York as well as in New Jersey and New England. Between 1976 and 1986 White and Coe wrote, produced and performed two two-woman shows Music Hall Favourites and Oscar Wilde and Wonderful as Coe-White Associates, appearing in New York and New Jersey. In 1989, White presented Ladies and Other Females, a one-woman show including excerpts from Shakespeare and Noël Coward.

=== Girl Scouts of USA ===
White credited GSUSA for “encouraging her creative talents”. She held many positions within the organisation, including Program Specialist, Advisor in the Leadership Bureau, Training Advisor, Advisor in the Training Division of the Personnel Department, Assistant to the Director of the Program Department and, for several years, Director of Dramatics at the Girl Scout National Training School. She was Associate Editor for the Girl Scout Leader magazine from 1959 to 1966, joining the Editorial Board in 1963.

== Writing, editing and recording ==
White wrote in multiple genres including gothic romance, children's fiction, Girl Scout articles, song lyrics and plays. Her literary agent was Frieda Fishbein.

=== Plays co-authored with Janet E. Tobitt ===
- One Act Trips Abroad (1931)
- Dramatized Ballads with Musical Accompaniment (1937) also with Barbara Danielson
- Plays for High Holidays with Incidental Dancing and Music (1939)
- The Saucy Sailor and Other Dramatized Ballads (1940)

=== Works for choral reading ===
Choral reading is reading aloud in unison as a group to help build fluency and self-confidence.

- Anthology of Choral Readings (1944)
- A Bouquet of Poems, Selected and Arranged for Choral Speaking (1966) illustrated by Martha Coe. It included a 33.3 rpm record narrated by Joel Templeton.

=== Girl Scouts ===
White wrote pageants, productions for conventions and other special events, and many Girl Scout Leader articles. She also wrote:

- Dramatic Cues for Girl Scout Leaders (1937)
- Recruiting Volunteers (1955) with Margaret Delano
- Recruiting, Selecting and Placing Volunteers (1960)
- The Golden Promise: A Fiftieth Anniversary Ceremony for Girl Scout Councils (1962)
- It’s Up To Us! A Ceremony for Girl Scouts (1963) (an adaptation of the closing ceremony used at the 36th National Convention at Miami Beach)
- Brownies’ Own Songbook (1968) with music by Martha Coe. It sold over 150,000 copies

=== Lyrics ===
- My World In You (1959) with music by Martha Coe
- Until You Said Goodbye (1959) with music by Martha Coe

=== Gothic romance ===
Writing under the pseudonym Alicen White, she published five gothic romance novels, one of which Nor Spell Nor Charm, received the Edgar Allan Poe Scroll Award in the Best Paperback Original category at the 1972 Mystery Writers of America Awards. The books drew upon her experiences of growing up in Scotland.

- Dirge for a Lady (1968)
- Nor Spell, Nor Charm (1972) recipient of the Edgar Allan Poe Scroll Award, MWA Awards
- Evil that Walks Invisible (1973)
- The Traitor Within (1974)
- The Watching Eye (1977)

=== Musical plays ===
White wrote the book and / or lyrics to four musical plays, with music by Martha Coe.

- Quite A Young Girl(1960) White and Coe, together with lyricist Peter Colonna, wrote the two-act musical comedy Quite A Young Girl, with a libretto taken from 9-year old Daisy Ashford’s best-selling novel The Young Visiters (1919). Several playwrights had previously attempted to adapt the novel for the stage, but none of their efforts was deemed acceptable by the author. Coe and White's version was reported to have received the author's blessing, but they ultimately failed to find a producer.
- The Absent Minded Dragon (1963) book by James Truax, musical director Anne McLarnon. It appeared at Stage 73, off-Broadway and ran for almost three years. The cast included Robert Campuzano, Ruth Coleman and Al Kavanagh.
- The Brownies (1964) a dramatized musical inspired by Juliana H Ewing’s story of the same name from 1865. It appeared at the Renata Theatre, New York, with White featuring in the cast and on an associated LP.
- The Enchanted Forest (1964)

=== Others ===
- The Actor’s Art and Job (1942) by Harry Irvine, for which White wrote the preface
- The Last Train Out (1962) a screenplay, written with Mary Jean Parson, Susan Wayne and Martha Coe
- Folly to be Wise (1964) a comic play in three acts
- Walter in Love (1973) a children's book, illustrated by Ruth Rosekrans Hoffman and dedicated to Coe. She was inspired to write it by her two dogs, Leo and Annie.
