= Persatuan Pandu Puteri Malaysia =

Malaysian Guiding organization

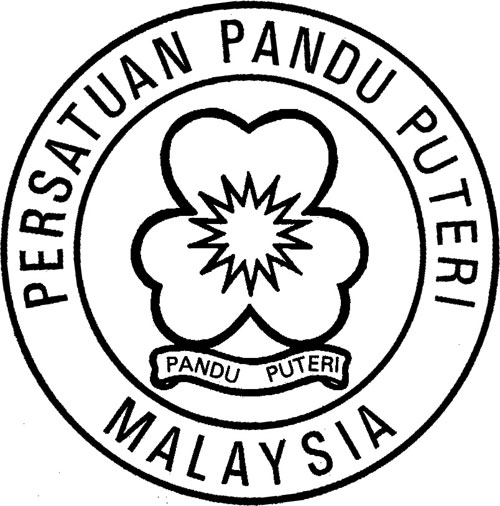
- Girl Guides Association of Malaysia
- ڤرساتوان ڤندو ڤوتري مليسيا
- Country: Malaysia
- Founded: 1916
- Membership: 73,915
- President: Wan Azizah Wan Ismail
- Affiliation: World Association of Girl Guides and Girl Scouts
- Website www.panduputeri.org.my

Persatuan Pandu Puteri Malaysia (PPPM; Jawi: ڤرساتوان ڤندو ڤوتري مليسيا, English: Girl Guides Association of Malaysia) is the national Guiding organization of Malaysia. It serves 73,915 members (as of 2008). Founded in 1916, the girls-only organization became a full member of the World Association of Girl Guides and Girl Scouts in 1960.

== History ==
The Girl Guide movement in what is now Malaysia began in the early 20th century. The first Girl Guide unit in Malaya was formed in 1916 at the Methodist Girls' School in Kuala Lumpur; the movement was registered at the Headquarters of Girl Guides, Calcutta, in 1917.

During the interwar years and the period of British colonial administration, Guiding in Malaya grew largely through school and community units and was administered alongside Guiding in neighbouring Singapore. After World War II the movement was reorganised and expanded by leaders active in the post-war period, notably Agnes Pinnick, who played a prominent role in reorganising the Guide movement in Malaya and Singapore and served as Chief Commissioner in the late 1940s.

In the 1950s the national headquarters was established in Kuala Lumpur: the original headquarters building (known as the Agnes Pinnick Hut) was inaugurated in 1955, and on 25 October 1969 a new national headquarters on Jalan Pantai Bharu was officially opened to replace the earlier building.

Following Malaya's independence the organisation continued to formalise its national status. The Girl Guides Association of Malaya became a full member of the World Association of Girl Guides and Girl Scouts (WAGGGS) in 1960; after the formation of Malaysia in 1963 the Girl Guide associations of Sabah and Sarawak were incorporated into the national body.

PPPM continued to expand its programmes and membership through the late 20th century into the 21st century. The centenary of Guiding in Malaysia was celebrated in 2016, when national and local units marked 100 years since the earliest recorded unit in 1916. The association today operates national headquarters (Wisma Pandu Puteri) in Kuala Lumpur and continues to run programmes across Peninsular Malaysia, Sabah and Sarawak.

== Program and ideals ==
The association is divided in six section according to age:

- Pandu Puteri Kelip-Kelip (Firefly Guides) - ages 4 to 8
- Pandu Puteri Tunas (Brownie Guides) - ages 9 to 12
- Pandu Puteri Remaja (Junior Guides) - ages 13 to 15
- Pandu Puteri Renjer (Ranger Guides) - ages 16 to 18
- Pandu Puteri Klover (Clovers Guides) - aged 18 to 30
- Pemimpin (Leaders)

The Girl Guide emblem incorporates elements of the flag of Malaysia.

=== Guide Promise ===
On my honour I promise that I will do my best
to God, King, and my Country Malaysia
to help people at all times
and to obey the guide laws.

=== Guide Law ===
1. A Guide's honour is to be trusted.
2. A Guide is loyal.
3. A Guides's duty is to be useful and help others.
4. A Guide is friend to all and a sister to every other guide.
5. A Guide is courteous.
6. A Guide is a friend to animals and care for all living things.
7. A Guide obey orders.
8. A Guide smiles and sings under all difficulties.
9. A Guide is thrifty.
10. A Guide is pure in thought, word and in deed.

== Gang Shows ==
The Penang Gang Show is organised by the Girl Guides of Penang.

== See also ==
- Persekutuan Pengakap Malaysia
