= Anna Suckling =

English Girl Guide leader (1863-1946)

- Born: Anna Maria Jerome; 1863; Sutton Coldfield, England
- Died: 9 April 1946; Oxford, England
- Occupation: Girl Guide leader
- Spouse: Cornelius William Suckling (m. 1881)
- Children: 2

Anna Suckling (1863 – 9 April 1946) was the first County commissioner for Girl Guides in Warwickshire. She was recipient of the Silver Fish Award, the Girl Guide movement's highest award for adults.

== Personal life ==
Anna Maria Jerome was born in 1863 to John and Mary Jerome. She was the oldest of five children. The family home was Holland House, Sutton Coldfield. She married Cornelius William Suckling (1856–1935), a surgeon, in 1881. They lived in Edgbaston and had two sons, John and Cornelius. She was living in Oxford when she died.

== Girl Guides ==
Suckling became involved with Girl Guiding in 1910, one year after the movement's foundation. Between 1913 and 1921 she served as the first County Commissioner for Girl Guiding in Warwickshire. Suckling organised the movement across the Midlands with membership increasing so significantly during her time that between 1912 and 1921 six additional Division Commissioners were appointed. In July 1913, Lord and Lady Baden-Powell inspected 150 Girl Guides representing nine companies at the Suckling's home.

Suckling received the Silver Fish Award, Girl Guiding's highest adult honour, in 1921. It was presented by the Chief Guide, Lady Olave Baden-Powell, at Warwickshire's first Guide Rally, at Shrubland Park in Leamington Spa. Suckling resigned from her position as County Commissioner in October 1921 but continued to be involved in Guiding until at least 1924.
