= Helen Malcolm =

British Girl Guiding and YWCA executive

- Born: Helen Malcolm; 12 February 1873; Kemerton, England
- Died: 1 May 1934 (aged 61); Clevedon, England
- Occupation(s): Girl Guide and YWCA executive
- Father: George Malcolm

Helen Malcolm (12 February 1873 – 1 May 1934) was a YWCA executive, who was instrumental in developing the YWCA section of the early Girl Guide Association (GGA). She received the Silver Fish Award, the GGA's highest adult honour.

== Early life ==
Malcolm was born to General Sir George Malcolm GCB and Wilhelmina Charlotte Hughes. She had two brothers. She spent much of her life in Clevedon, Somerset.

== YWCA and the Girl Guides Association ==
Malcolm served as junior editorial secretary of the YWCA which, in the early twentieth century, conducted global research to find those organisations that "gave best results for girls from 13.5 years of age to 19". The research identified the Girl Guides as being "unique in this respect" and the YWCA subsequently became closely involved with the Girl Guide movement in its early years, with Malcolm and Marion Dashwood taking the lead. In 1913 Malcolm was invited to become president of the YWCA section of the Girl Guides. Around the same time she encouraged Lady Alice Behrens to get involved with Guiding in Manchester. Behrens would go on to become the movement's first head of training and first Guider-In-Charge of Foxlease.

Malcolm spoke at a Girl Guides rally in February 1914 and in the same year began to run training sessions for Girl Guide leaders across the country. By 1914 the YWCA section of the Girl Guides had 9,000 members, overseen by Malcolm. By 1915 she was national commissioner of the YWCA section of Girl Guides, a position she held until at least 1918. She was also district commissioner of Clevedon Girl Guides from 1919 until her death.

In later years, with failing health, she opened her home, Valetta, in Clevedon, Somerset as a rest home for Guiders. A memorial service for Malcolm was held at St Simon Zelotes, London. The Helen Malcolm Memorial Fund, overseen by Rose Kerr, provided one week's "absolutely free training each year" to a Girl Guide leader, at any of the organisation's training centres.

== Other ==
She served as vice president of the Clevedon Girls' Club.
