= Gladys Millard =

Canadian Girl Guide leader (1891–1964)

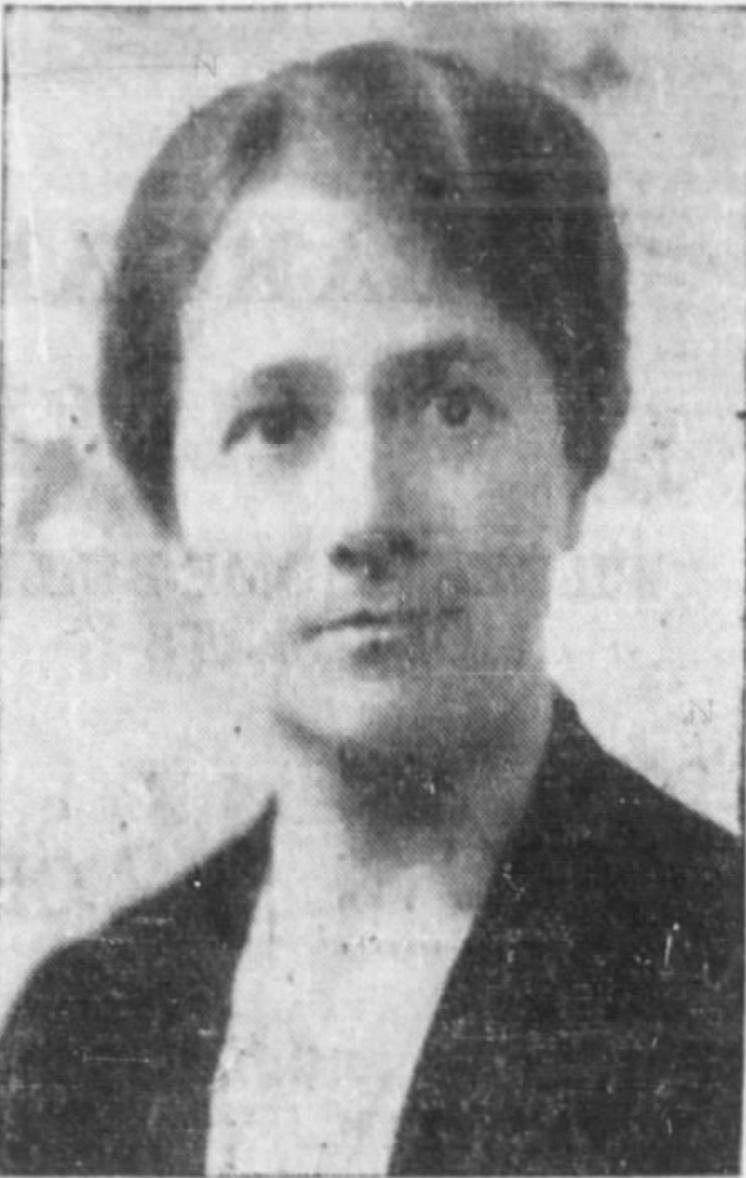
- Gladys Millard from a 1937 newspaper
- Born: July 1891; Somerset, England
- Died: 15 October 1964 (aged 73); Victoria, Canada
- Occupations: Girl Guide leader Headmistress

Gladys Millard (July 1891 - 15 October 1964) was provincial secretary for the Canadian Girl Guides Association in the 1930s and 1940s. She was also president of the Headmistresses’ Association of Canada. She was a recipient of the Silver Fish Award, Girl Guiding's highest adult honour.

== Early life and education ==
Gladys Edna H. Millard was born in Kingsbury, Somerset to parents Eliza Ann (née Bailey) and William James Sydney Millard. She had a younger sister, Irene. Both her parents died before she was 18. She was adopted by Dr. Ethilda Budgett-Meakin Budgett Herford (1872-1956), one of the UK's first female psychiatrists.

Millard attended Sunny Hill Girls’ School, Bruton, England, and by 1911 she was living in Norton-sub-Hamdon working as a governess. She read biology at the University of London.

== Work ==
When World War I interrupted her university studies, Millard substituted for an instructor in a boys’ school. Subsequently, she left the UK and moved to Canada, where she worked as a teacher and then school principal. She was interested in many educational movements and was known for her excellent musical training.

In 1920 she was teaching at Rupert Land Ladies’ College in Winnipeg. Established 19 years previously, the school offered higher education for girls. By 1921 she was Head of the Day School and from 1928 to 1937 she was the Principal.

When the school went through a period of financial hardship, Millard offered to have her salary cut “again”. This offer was declined, on the grounds that “she was already doing the work of two people and that the economies already realized were largely due to her unfailing interest and diligence in these matters.”

By the mid-1930s she was President of the Headmistresses’ Association of Canada.

Between 1937 and 1952 she was Principal of Havergal Ladies’ College in Lawrence Park, Toronto. In her latter years at Havergal she suffered from ill health and used a wheelchair.

=== Retirement ===
After retiring in 1952 she drove “across the continent” with Constance Ellis, the Vice-Principal of Havergal. Ellis was described as Millard's “helpmeet.” In the same year she moved to Victoria for her health, living with Ellis in Vancouver Street, Victoria, BC. By 1964 they were living in Oak Bay, Victoria.

== Girl Guiding ==
In 1927, Millard was a Brown Owl for a Brownie Pack in Manitoba. In 1929 she was appointed District Commissioner of the newly created District 9 of Manitoba Girl Guides Association. In 1930 she was one of two leaders chosen by the Dominion Executive to represent Canada at the WAGGGS' 6th World Conference at Foxlease, New Forest, England. During this trip, she completed her training and was awarded the Eagle Owl diploma, signifying she was a certified trainer of Brown and Tawny Owls. She was awarded the Medal of Merit by Lady Baden-Powell.

By 1936 she was the provincial secretary for the Canadian Girl Guides Association. The following year she received the Silver Fish Award, Girl Guiding's highest adult honour. In 1940 she reported on Rangers’ activity during the Canadian Girl Guide Council's annual meeting. The following year she was a Dominion Executive, representing Toronto. In 1942 she was elected honorary secretary of the Canadian Girl Guide Council.
