= Lilian Gresham =

Australian Girl Guide leader (1906–1973)

Lilian Gresham MBE
- Gresham from a 1945 newspaper article
- Born: 10 July 1906; Bengal, India
- Died: 15 October 1973 (aged 67)
- Other name: H S Gresham
- Occupation: Australian Girl Guide leader
- Spouse: Harvey Sydney Gresham (m. 1932)
- Children: 4

Lilian Gresham MBE (10 July 1906 — 15 October 1973) was State commissioner for Queensland Girl Guides between 1945 and 1955, and recipient of the Silver Fish Award, Girl Guiding’s highest adult honour.

== Personal life ==
Lilian Bessie Holmes was the eldest daughter of the Henry Robert Holmes, the Dean of Bathurst and Elsie Ada Harland Mills. Born in Bengal, India, she had two younger sisters. She married Harvey Sydney Gresham (born 1895) in Bathurst, New South Wales in 1932, moving to Queensland soon afterwards. They had four children.

== Girl Guides ==
Gresham began her Guiding life with the 1st West Maitland (St. Mary’s) Company in Hunter Valley, NSW around 1923. In 1928 she joined 2nd Bathurst Company, becoming captain in 1930. The following year she took charge of the Brownie pack and was then appointed district commissioner.

After her marriage in 1932 she moved to Queensland and was appointed division commissioner for South Brisbane Guiding. She stepped down for several years owing to family commitments. She returned to Guiding in 1944 and was appointed acting deputy assistant state commissioner for Queensland. Between 1945 and 1954 she was state commissioner of Queensland Girl Guides Association. She was the youngest state commissioner ever to take office at that point, and was the first to use the state commissioner’s Standard.

In 1948 Gresham received a slice of Princess Elizabeth’s wedding cake. Australian Girl Guides had provided most of the ingredients for the cake, shipping them from Australia, as the UK still had food rationing at the time, a legacy of WWII. After the wedding, a layer of the cake was shipped back to Australia as a thank you to Australian Girl Guides from their patron, Princess Elizabeth.

In 1952 Gresham was selected to attend the 14th World Conference of WAGGGS in Dombås, Norway. She was the first delegate from Queensland to attend a WAGGGS conference. On the same trip she attended a conference for overseas commissioners at Foxlease in Hampshire, England and took the opportunity to travel around continental Europe. While in the Girl Guides’ Association shop in London, she was presented to the Princess Royal, President of the British Girl Guides’ Association, who was there shopping for gifts. They discussed Guiding in Queensland.

In 1953 Gresham travelled to Papua New Guinea to visit activist Dame Rachel Cleland and Daphne Carpenter, a trainer from Queensland HQ who had moved to Moresby to help establish good practice in PNG Guiding.

Gresham finished her term as state commissioner in 1954, moving on to the role of Brown Owl with the Spastic Centre (now Cerebral Palsy Alliance) Pack. In 1960 she became a vice-president of the Australian Girl Guide Association, and in 1961 she took the role of state public relations advisor. She was president of the Australian Headquarters Trefoil Guild. By 1972 she was serving as the chair of the Girl Guides Association of Australia’s awards committee.

== Awards ==
- 1950 – Silver Fish Award, Girl Guiding’s highest adult honour
- 1953 – Queen Elizabeth II Coronation Medal
- 1971 – MBE for services to Guiding
