= Jane Deeter Rippin =

Former director of the Girl Scouts of the USA

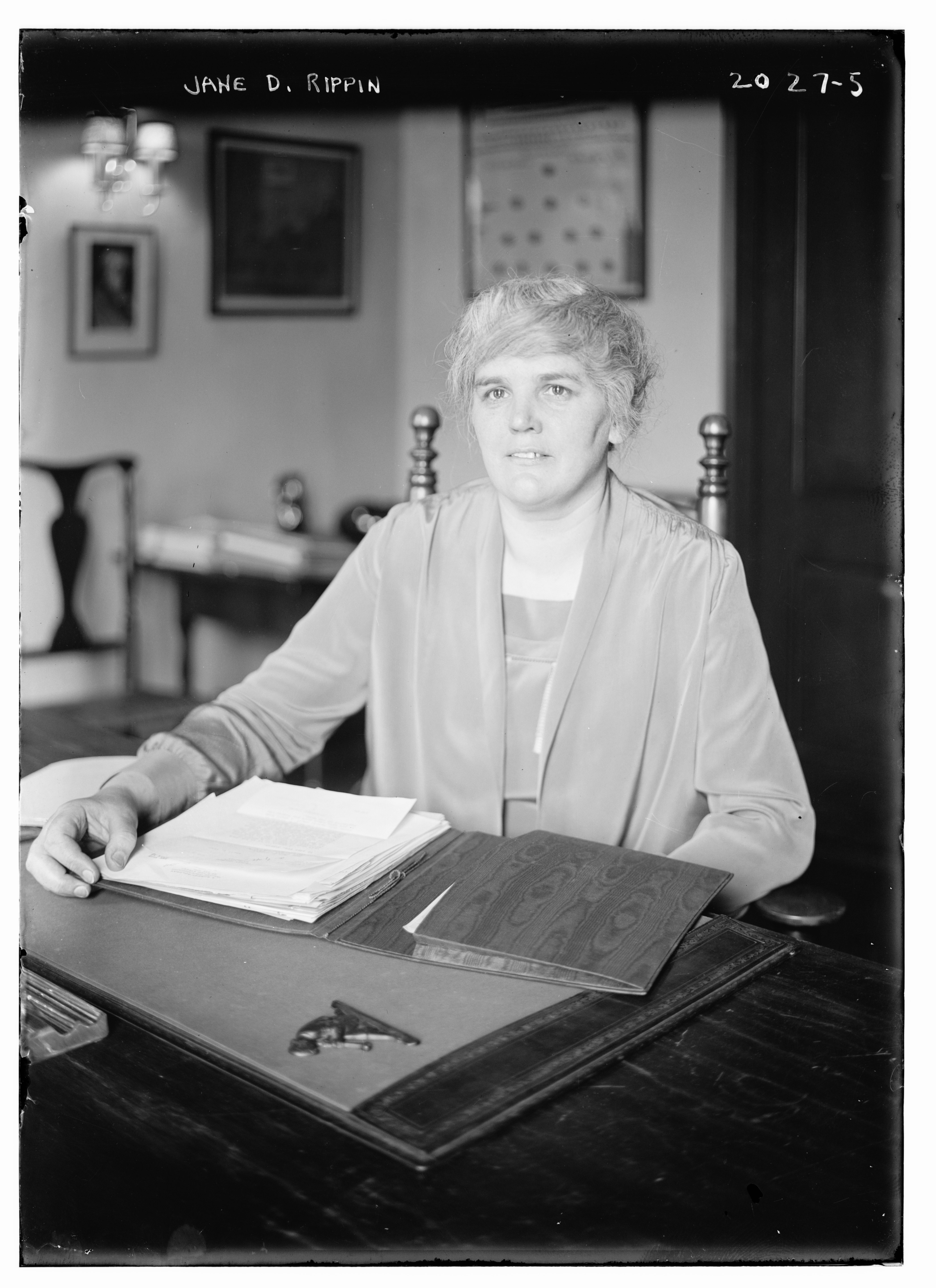
- Rippin (c)

National Director of the Girl Scouts of the USA
- In office 1919–1930
- President: Juliette Gordon Low

Personal details
- Born: Jane Deeter; May 30, 1882 Harrisburg, Pennsylvania
- Died: June 1953 (aged 71) Tarrytown, New York
- Spouse: James Yardley Rippin
- Education: B.S.
- Alma mater: Irving College

Jane Parker Deeter Rippin (1882–1953) was an American social worker, who served as the national director of the Girl Scouts of the USA from 1919 until 1930. During her tenure, she saw Girl Scout membership quintuple from 50,000 to 250,000; she also oversaw the formation of local Girl Scout councils and the start of Girl Scout cookie sales.

== Background ==
Rippin was born 30 May 1882 in Harrisburg, Pennsylvania to Jasper Newton Deeter and Sarah Emily Mather. She married James Yardley Rippen in 1913 in Summerdale, Pennsylvania.

Rippin trained as a teacher but decided to enter social work, finding a job at an orphanage. She went on to became a caseworker for the Philadelphia Society for the Prevention of Cruelty to Children, and then a probation officer for the Municipal Court of Philadelphia. In 1916, Rippin became the city's chief probation officer, in charge of five courts, over the objections of a prominent judge who felt that “the position should be held by a man.” She supervised 77 workers who made tens of thousands of “visits” a year, interviewing “warring couples,” abandoned children, indigent parents, and wayward young women.

In 1917, she opened a "women offenders home" which included a treatment center, employment agency and court.

In November 1917, she left Philadelphia to work for the Committee on Protective Work for Girls, a subcommittee of the Commission on Training Camp Activates (CTCA) and crucial branch of the American Plan. She believed that most women near military camps were "delinquent girls" that should be locked up and proposed drafting women in some form of military service.

In 1918 she restructured the CTCA Section on Women and Girls into ten national districts, each headed by a supervisor and "fixed post representatives'. Rippin instructed them that the fixed post representatives were to “concern [themselves] with delinquent girls and all girls between the ages of 10 and 21 against whom there has been any definite complaint,” The representatives would “also be responsible for work with the so-called charity girl and professional prostitute, whether diseased or not, and with women having venereal disease.” Rippin further recommended the fixed post representatives appoint a “volunteer patrol” of local “business women” to go out in pairs and inconspicuously study local women, looking for suspicious ones. At the fixed post worker's instigation, those suspicious women were either given a talking to or arrested and examined.

Under Rippin's command the Section on Women and Girls moved away from its goal of protecting reformable women to protecting the nation from women. In 1918 approximately 28,000 to 30,000 women and girls came under the supervision of Rippin's fixed post representatives and their supervisors.

She was a recipient of the Silver Fish Award, the highest adult award in Girlguiding, awarded for outstanding service to Girlguiding combined with service to world Guiding.
