= Silver Fish Award =

Highest adult award in Guiding

- Created: 1911 (115 years ago)

The Silver Fish Award is the highest adult award in Girlguiding. It is awarded for outstanding service to Girlguiding combined with service to world Guiding. The award has changed greatly since it first appeared in 1911, initially being awarded to girls on completion of a number of badges, then via numerous stages to the highest award in the Guiding movement worldwide, and then on to its position as a Girlguiding award.

== Award criteria ==
The Silver Fish is not earned, but given to those who are nominated and are considered worthy of the award. Recipients must be members of Girlguiding, have done outstanding service to Guiding in more than one capacity and made a contribution to world Guiding. Ideally candidates should be at least 18 months from retirement and have held an appointment within 6 months of the nomination.

== History ==
The award of Silver Fish existed from the beginning of the Guiding movement. The choice of the silver fish was as a result of Lord Baden-Powell visiting Japan, where he learnt that when a son was born, parents would hang a small silver fish on their door, signifying the boy would be able to successfully 'swim upstream' through life's challenges. If a daughter was born, a tiny doll was used. This indicated a girl's sole aim was to raise a family. Lord Baden-Powell decided to make a Guide's highest honour a silver fish, to show that girls are just as capable of battling against the odds as boys.

=== Award for Girl Guides ===
The award is mentioned in the November 1909 edition of the Boy Scout Headquarters Gazette in "The Scheme for 'Girl Guides'". Here a girl must pass seventeen specified efficiency badges. However, in Pamphlet A: Baden-Powell Girl Guides, a Suggestion for Character Training for Girls, also published in 1909, twenty efficiency badges were needed to obtain the Silver Fish. This was later reduced to fifteen and, additionally, good all round work was required. A. M. Irvine published the Girl Guide story Nora, the Girl Guide; or, From Tenderfoot to Silver Fish in 1913.

By 1918 a Silver Fish was awarded by headquarters "on the recommendation of County Commissioners for some very special Service to the Movement". In May 1918 The Girl Guides Gazette reported that the requirements for the Silver Fish would change in order to capture the award's "original character" and that it would become "the highest award that was given and not gained."

=== Award for Girl Scouts of USA ===
Around the time of the foundation of the Girl Scouts of the USA in 1912, their handbook listed the Silver Fish as the highest honour in Girl Scouting. However, before anyone could earn it, the Golden Eaglet was introduced.

Five American women were awarded the Silver Fish:

- Juliette Gordon Low, founder of Girl Scouts USA
- Anne Hyde Choate, Juliette's goddaughter and the second president of Girl Scouts USA
- Helen Storrow, donor of Our Chalet
- Jane Deeter Rippin, National Director of GSUSA
- Julia Cobb Crowell, Chair of the Committee

=== Award for adults ===
In October 1917, the award changed to being given for outstanding service to the movement. At this time, the design also changed from a whiting with its tail in its mouth worn on a silver chain, to a swimming fish worn on a dark and light blue striped ribbon. Olave Baden-Powell was presented with a gold Silver Fish in 1918, then the only one of its kind. Percy Everett, one of the "original Brownsea campers" was GGA's Hon. secretary in the early years. He was awarded the Silver Fish in June 1921. In 1995, her daughter Betty Clay was presented with a gold Silver Fish in the form of a brooch. It continues to be awarded within UK GirlGuiding to this day.

== Recipients ==
=== 1911–1919 ===
| Recipient | Year | Notes |
|---|---|---|
| Nesta G. Ashworth née Maude (1893–1982) | 1911 | Awarded old-style Silver Fish in 1911. Also in 1920. One of the girls who showed up at Crystal Palace Rally in 1909 wanting to be Scouts. Instrumental in the establishment of Lone Guides. |
| Rotha Lintorn-Orman (1895–1935) | 1911 | Awarded old-style Silver Fish in 1911. One of the girls who showed up at Crystal Palace Rally in 1909 wanting to be a Scout. |
| Mrs Addison | 1914 | |
| I New | 1915 | |
| Florence Hardy | 1916 | |
| Eustace Penburthy | 1916 | |
| Olave Baden-Powell GBE (1889–1977) | 1918 | Chief Guide. She received a special 'Golden Fish' "as a public recognition of her wonderful work" |
| L Chidley | 1918 | Patrol leader, 1st Royal Eltham |
| C Hall | 1918 | Patrol leader, 1st Pendleton |
| Aileen Hayeem | 1918 | First Guide to earn the Silver Fish Award in India |
| Hon. Ruth Hubbard (1896–1955) | 1918 | Captain, 1st Addington |
| E King | 1918 | Lieutenant, 2nd Ealing |
| A Lowson | 1918 | Lieutenant, 1st Durham |
| Theodora Mellor | 1918 | District commissioner, South Manchester |
| E Orchard | 1918 | Lieutenant, 1st Pendleton |
| P Pentreath | 1918 | Patrol leader, 2nd Ealing |
| D Pidgeon | 1918 | Patrol Leader, 1st Kingston |
| Hilda Ramsbottom | 1918 | Lieutenant, 1st Claremont |
| Enid Robinson | 1918 | Captain, 4th Woking |
| G M Robinson | 1918 | Captain, 9th Birkenhead |
| Barbara Cave | 1919 | 1st Woking |
| Dorothy Jeavons | 1919 | Lieutenant, 1st Wolverhampton (YWCA) |
| V Kenilworth | 1919 | Patrol leader, 2nd Ealing |
| Hilda Leighton | 1919 | |
| Juliette "Daisy" Gordon Low (1860–1927) | 1919 | Founder of Girl Scouts of the USA. She was buried wearing full uniform and her Silver Fish Award. This was one of the first adult awards |
| Miss Mallory | 1919 | Captain, 1st Kidderminster |
| J E Naish | 1919 | Lieutenant, 2nd Woking |
| P Poulton | 1919 | Patrol leader, 1st Muswell Hill |
| W Withers | 1919 | Lieutenant, 1st South Manchester |

=== 1920–1929 ===
| Recipient | Year | Notes |
|---|---|---|
| Mrs Furse | 1920 | Provincial commissioner, Transvaal |
| Lady Helen Whitaker (1890–1929) | 1920 | County commissioner, Hampshire |
| Margaret Campbell | 1921 | For saving a young boy's life by pulling him out from under a lorry |
| Anne Hyde Choate (1886–1967) | 1921 | Second president of Girl Scouts USA |
| Lady Clinton (1863–1953) | 1921 | County commissioner, Devon |
| Mrs Dixon | 1921 | County commissioner, Dublin |
| Sir Percy Everett | 1921 | GGA Hon. treasurer |
| Edith Marriott | 1921 | For rescuing someone who was drowning |
| Agnes M Maynard OBE | 1921 | Division commissioner, Wimbledon; Awarded Silver Fish twice |
| Olive Nichols (1864–1944) | 1921 | Deputy chief commissioner, Wales |
| Mary Pellatt (1857–1924) | 1921 | First chief commissioner, Girl Guides of Canada (1912–1921) |
| Helen Storrow (1864–1944) | 1921 | Donor of Our Chalet |
| Anna Suckling (1863–1946) | 1921 | County Commissioner, Warwickshire |
| Alice Anne Baird (1871–1959) | 1922 | Cadet branch, head. County commissioner, Worcestershire |
| Miss Buchan Hepburn | 1922 | Deputy chief commissioner, Scotland |
| Hon. Rachel Kay-Shuttleworth MBE (1886–1967) | 1922 | First County commissioner (1916); First heraldry advisor |
| Fflorens Roch (1879–1969) | 1922 | Deputy chief commissioner, Wales |
| Helen Malcolm | 1923 | District commissioner, Clevedon |
| Mrs Warren | 1923 | Chief commissioner, Canada |
| Rachel Heath | 1924 | Great Brown Owl |
| Margaret Prior | 1924 | Chief's diploma, "for excellent service to the movement both at home and abroad" |
| Kathleen Robinson | 1924 | For good service to the movement in Australia |
| Mrs Benson | 1925 | Imperial council |
| Princess Mary (1897–1965) | 1925 | Honorary president, Girl Guides Association from 1920 until her death |
| Mrs Cathcart | 1925 | Head of camping, Scotland |
| Ysobel Stewart | 1925 | Head of training for Scotland |
| Muriel de Lisle | 1925 | Assistant county commissioner, Warwickshire |
| Mary C Royden | 1925 | County commissioner, Cheshire |
| Lady Cave | 1926 | Division commissioner, Kingston |
| Miss Holland | 1925 | Division commissioner, Bath |
| Patricia Richards | 1927 | |
| Rosa Ward OBE (1893–1984) | 1928 | Chief commissioner, Wales; Chair, Guide International Service (1942–1954) |
| Miss Bewley | 1929 | Head of Rangers |
| Lila Chilton Thomas (d. 1989) | 1929 | Great Brown Owl |
| Mrs Houison Craufurd | 1929 | Scottish Chief Commissioner |
| Lady Delia Peel | 1929 | Chief Commissioner |

=== 1930–1939 ===
| Recipient | Year | Notes |
|---|---|---|
| Muriel Montgomery MBE | 1930 | General secretary, London headquarters |
| Robina Hamilton | 1931 | Division commissioner, South-East Victoria, State committee, Victoria, Australia |
| Olive Kelso King (1885–1958) | 1931 | Acting State commissioner, New South Wales. First Australian recipient. |
| Mrs Arthur Lewin | 1931 | Commissioner for Lone Guides, South Africa, Editor, South African Guide magazine |
| Mrs MacNeillie | 1931 | Provincial commissioner, Transvaal, South Africa |
| Carey Morgan | 1931 | Provincial commissioner, Bengal |
| Mrs Alan Morkill | 1931 | Outstanding work in connection with the 1927 Dominion Guides camp held in Australia |
| Lady Finola Somers CBE (1896–1981) | 1931 | State commissioner, Victorian Girl Guides, Australia; Girl Guides Association chief commissioner (1943–1949) |
| W R Wilson | 1931 | Chief commissioner, New Zealand |
| Lady Stubbs | 1932 | Island commissioner, Jamaica |
| Helen Talbot | 1932 | Commissioner for overseas Guiding |
| Lady Butler (1872–1951) | 1932 | Chair, All-India executive committee |
| Lady Blythswood | 1933 | Deputy chief commissioner, Wales |
| Dame Helen Gwynne-Vaughan GBE | 1933 | Chair, committee of the council |
| Lady Hore-Ruthven | 1933 | State chief commissioner, South Australia |
| Miss Rosseter | 1933 | Eagle Owl of Canada |
| Marguerite de Beaumont (1899–1989) | 1934 | Cambridgeshire County commissioner. One of the girls who showed up at Crystal Palace Rally in 1909 wanting to be Scouts. |
| Lady David | 1934 | Chief State commissioner, New South Wales, Australia |
| Mrs Hood | 1933 | Commissioner for extensions |
| Lady Luke | 1934 | Bedfordshire's first County commissioner (1917–1938) |
| C Warren | 1934 | Divisional commissioner, Woking |
| K M Wilson | 1934 | Excellent service to the movement |
| The Countess of Clarendon | 1935 | South Africa Girl Guides, president |
| Mrs Ralph Carver | 1936 | Commissioner, Egypt |
| Sir Jeremiah Colman, 1st Baronet | 1936 | Funding London's East End Scouting home, Roland House |
| Nora G Dillon | 1936 | Durham County commissioner Executive committee of the Council at Imperial Headquarters (1932–1935) |
| Mrs Pickering | 1936 | County commissioner, Yorkshire |
| H B Prior (d.1959) | 1937 | Provincial commissioner, Burma |
| Rosalind Hamilton Duchess of Abercorn (1869–1958) | 1937 | Ulster chief commissioner |
| Ruth Callander | 1937 | Scottish post and extension branches |
| Gladys Millard (1891–1964) | 1937 | Girl Guide Association, Manitoba, Canada |
| Maud Carnegie, Countess of Southesk (1893–1945) | 1937 | County commissioner, Angus and Aberdeenshire; Scottish executive committee member |
| Mrs Leigh-White OBE | 1937 | Deputy chief commissioner, Ireland |
| Muriel Monteith JP | 1937 | Assistant County commissioner, Fife |
| Mrs Charles Tufton OBE | 1937 | Executive committee, vice-chair |
| Lady Dorothy Arthur | 1938 | Provincial commissioner, Bengal |
| The Honourable Lady Cochrane | 1938 | Kent County commissioner |
| Lilias Dalmahoy | 1938 | Edinburgh County commissioner |
| Miss G Hanbury-Williams MVO | 1938 | Council of Girl Guides Association (1927–1961) |
| Janet Allan | 1939 | Commissioner for extensions |
| Margery Bray (1894–1962) | 1939 | Imperial commissioner, training |
| Allison Cargill (1896–1979) | 1939 | Scotland's first Guide; President of Scottish GGA, VP of GGA |
| Miss Chadwick | 1939 | Chief commissioner, India |
| Mrs Fairweather | 1939 | Assistant County commissioner, Kent; Assistant commissioner, awards |
| Miss Greenless | 1939 | County commissioner, Midlothian |
| Lady Haigh | 1939 | Provincial commissioner, United Provinces, India |
| A Landau MBE | 1939 | Commissioner for Hebrew Guides, Jerusalem |
| Elsa Riepert (1890–1961) | 1939 | Dominion secretary, Canada (1920–1941) |

=== 1940–1949 ===
| Recipient | Year | Notes |
|---|---|---|
| R C Drysdale | 1940 | Organising commissioner, Argentina |
| Mrs Fisher Rowe | 1940 | Hon. secretary, Overseas Association |
| Kelly Lawson | 1940 | Island commissioner, Jamaica |
| Mrs Moore | 1942 | District commissioner, Canterbury City Guides. Awarded for gallantry during an air raid |
| Miss Packenham Walsh | 1942 | Commissioner, Madras |
| Mrs Pinhorn | 1942 | Hon treasurer, All India |
| Mrs Elliott Carnegy | 1943 | Chief commissioner, Scotland |
| Lady Charlotte Cooper | 1943 | Chief commissioner, India |
| Mrs Alan Morkill MBE | 1943 | |
| Lady Monroe | 1943 | Provincial commissioner, Punjab |
| M W Kydd | 1944 | Chief commissioner, Canada |
| Dame Joan Marsham DBE (1888–1972) | 1944 | Chair of Guiding Association's executive committee for 10 years from 1938 |
| Anna Moody (1881–1950) | 1944 | Deputy chief commissioner, Ulster |
| Jane Mervyn Newnham OBE | 1944 | Guider-in-charge, Foxlease |
| F C Sharp | 1944 | Dundee County commissioner |
| Mona Burgin (1903–1985) | 1945 | Active in New Zealand and as a trainer internationally |
| Emmeline Cadbury JP (1883-1966) | 1945 | County commissioner, Birmingham |
| Lady Cooper | 1945 | Chief commissioner, India |
| Dame Anstice Gibbs DCVO, CBE (1905–1978) | 1945 | Chief commissioner and chair of British Commonwealth Girl Guides Association (1956–1966); Vice-chair of WAGGGS (1957–1960) |
| Isobel Hetherington Kay MBE (1904–1980) | 1945 | Chair of Welsh Guide Council; Chief commissioner, Wales |
| Lady Eva Julius (1878–1972) | 1945 | Chief commissioner, New South Wales, Australia |
| Angela Thompson | 1945 | Division commissioner, S E Hertfordshire |
| Verona M. Wallace Williamson (1898–1980 ) | 1945 | Edinburgh County commissioner |
| Margaret Crosfield (1902–1988) | 1946 | Chair, All-India training subcommittee |
| Mrs Geoffrey Gibbs | 1946 | Hertfordshire County commissioner |
| Jean Clayton | 1947 | Imperial commissioner, Brownies |
| Marie Iles OBE | 1947 | Dominion secretary, New Zealand |
| Margaret Martin | 1947 | Commissioner for training |
| Margaret McIntyre OBE (1886–1948) | 1947 | Tasmanian state commissioner (1940–1948) |
| Lady Lee Steere OBE | 1947 | Commissioner for Girl Guides, Western Australia |
| P M Noaks MBE | 1947 | Chief commissioner and training advisor, Southern Rhodesia |
| Mrs John Corbett | 1948 | Chief commissioner, Canada |
| Irene Fairbairn (1899–1974) | 1948 | Chief Commissioner of Guides Australia, Federal Secretary |
| Ruth Herrick CBE (1889–1993) | 1948 | Chief commissioner, New Zealand (1934–1961) |
| Shylie Katherine Rymill (1882–1959) | 1948 | Commissioner, Australia; State commissioner, South Australia (1938–1950) |
| Mrs P M P Thompson | 1948 | Chair, Scottish public relations committee |
| Mrs Stewart | 1949 | Scottish chief commissioner (1946–1950) |
| E Williams | 1949 | Deputy chief commissioner, New Zealand |

=== 1950–1959 ===
| Recipient | Year | Notes |
|---|---|---|
| Kathleen Mabel Davies-Cooke OBE (1903–1994) | 1950 | Chair, Girl Guides Association; Chair and vice-patron, Trefoil Guild |
| Mrs Douglas of Mains | 1950 | County commissioner, Glasgow |
| Lilian Gresham (1906–1973) | 1950 | State commissioner, Queensland, Australia |
| Agnes Pinnick (1901–1953) | 1950 | Chief commissioner, Malaya and Singapore |
| D E S Wishart | 1950 | Chief commissioner, Canada |
| Tirzah Barnes | 1951 | Publications committee |
| Mrs Captain | 1951 | Chief commissioner, India |
| Mary Cuningham Chater MBE (1896–1990) | 1951 | Music advisor, Girl Guides Association (1949–1961) |
| Mrs Dutt | 1951 | Deputy chief commissioner, India |
| E D Harrison | 1951 | Brownie advisor |
| Olive Hillbrook | 1951 | Rangers commissioner, England |
| Mrs Hobson | 1951 | Chief commissioner, Ceylon |
| Begum G. A. Khan | 1951 | Chief commissioner, Pakistan Girl Guides Association |
| J B Williams | 1951 | Island commissioner, Barbados |
| Enid, Lady Burnham CBE (1894–1979) | 1952 | Girl Guide chief commissioner, England |
| J W Haughton OBE | 1952 | Chief commissioner, Ulster |
| Jessie Kerridge | 1952 | Commissioner for training, Jamaica |
| Dorothea Powell (1879-1986) | 1952 | Executive committee. Chair, education panel |
| Gwen Hesketh MBE | 1952 | Guide International Service commissioner Tasmania state commissioner (1956–1962) |
| Helen McSwiney OBE | 1953 | |
| Florence Mitchell (1891-1970) | 1953 | Assistant state commissioner, Victoria, Australia; President, Victoria Guide International Service |
| G Springall | 1953 | Division commissioner, Western Transvaal |
| D Strachan | 1953 | Chief commissioner, South Africa |
| Jean Helen St. Clair Campbell, Lady Stratheden and Campbell CBE (1901–1956) | 1953 | Chief commissioner, British Commonwealth (1949–1956) |
| Viscountess Colville of Culross | 1954 | Chief commissioner, Scotland |
| Betty Fripp OBE | 1954 | Commissioner, British Guides in Foreign Countries |
| Muriel Lees | 1954 | Chair, Sussex County camping committee |
| Eleanor Manning OBE (1906–1986) | 1954 | Chief commissioner of Guides, Australia; World committee of WAGGGS (1955–1962) |
| Ruth Tuckwell OBE | 1954 | Treasurer, WAGGGS |
| Beryl Barker | 1955 | Commissioner for British Guides, Egypt |
| Marjorie Grant | 1955 | Chief commissioner, South Africa |
| Elaine E Moran | 1955 | Training advisor, Australia |
| Margaret Pilkington MBE (1906–1985) | 1955 | Guide International Service team leader |
| Kathleen Dore MBE (d.1991) | 1956 | County commissioner, Essex (1947–1957) |
| May Douglas | 1956 | State commissioner, South Australia |
| Edna Mary Banham | 1957 | Post box secretary, CHQ and England |
| E M Beveridge | 1957 | Commonwealth camp advisor |
| Mrs Durrant | 1957 | Commissioner, Kenya |
| Beryl Gibson | 1957 | Commissioner for training, Cyprus |
| Senator Marion Greeves MBE (1894–1979) | 1957 | Chief commissioner, Ulster |
| Anne Shepherd OBE | 1957 | County commissioner, Yorkshire Central |
| Iona Taylor (1908-1978) | 1957 | For international service, and untiring work in Hampshire |
| W Rankine Nesbitt | 1957 | Chief commissioner, Canada |
| Mollie Walker MBE | 1957 | Training advisor, England |
| Gladys Niven | 1958 | Provincial commissioner, Natal, South Africa |
| Lady Elizabeth Pleydell-Bouverie (1897–1982) | 1958 | Captain, 1st Alderbury Company, Wiltshire |
| Helen Wynne OBE | 1958 | Chief commissioner, Southern Rhodesia |
| Mrs Guy Coleridge | 1959 | Ranger branch committee, chair |
| Sheila Macloed | 1959 | Camp advisor, Victoria, Australia |

=== 1960–1969 ===
| Recipient | Year | Notes |
|---|---|---|
| Clare Broadhurst | 1960 | Training advisor, Australia |
| Lady Davies | 1960 | Commonwealth training advisor |
| Lady Harley | 1960 | Deputy chief commissioner, England |
| Elizabeth Hartley OBE (1906–1996) | 1960 | Deputy chief commissioner, England |
| Alix Liddell (1907–1981) | 1960 | Publications committee, chair |
| Phyllis Moffett MBE (1908-1994) | 1960 | Deputy chief commissioner |
| Bessie Clough | 1961 | Provincial treasurer, Transvaal, South Africa |
| Mrs Cowan-Douglas | 1961 | International commissioner, South Africa |
| Merle Deer | 1962 | Training advisor, New South Wales, Australia |
| R Graeme Orr | 1962 | Assistant state commissioner, Victoria, Australia |
| E Henrietta Osler | 1962 | Chief commissioner, Canada |
| H A Toft OBE | 1962 | General secretary, Commonwealth headquarters |
| Mrs Charlton | 1963 | Queensland, Australia |
| Hon. Beryl Cozens-Hardy OBE (1911–2011) | 1963 | Chief Commissioner for England (1961–1970). Chair of WAGGGS (1972–1975) |
| Nancy Eastick MBE (1920–2011) | 1963 | Guide International Service volunteer, trainer and author |
| Mrs McKay | 1963 | Victoria, Australia' |
| E K Wade | 1963 | |
| Dame Leslie Whateley DBE | 1963 | Director, World Bureau |
| Miss Wood | 1963 | South Australia |
| Safiya Abdel-Rahman | 1965 | Egyptian Federation for Scouts and Girl Guides, also extremely active in sports for girls in Egypt |
| Gladys "Jim" Buntine OBE (1901–1992) | 1966 | Chief Commissioner of Guides Australia (1962–1968) |
| Sybil Canadine | 1967 | One of the original founders of the Girl Guide movement, County commissioner, Gloucestershire |
| Penelope "Pen" Wood-Hill (1909–1990) | 1967 | Ran Our Chalet. |
| Joyce Price OBE, CMG (1915–2009) | 1967 | Australian Chief Commissioner (1968–1973), Chairman of WAGGGS, Vice President of Olave Baden-Powell Society (1985–1994) |
| Princess Margaret, Countess of Snowden (1930–2002) | 1968 | President of the Guides |
| J P Moffett MBE | 1968 | Deputy chief commissioner of the Commonwealth, Commissioner for the Branch Association within the Commonwealth |
| Dame Ann Parker Bowles DCVRO | 1969 | In recognition of her wide and selfless service to the Association |

=== 1970–1979 ===
| Recipient | Year | Notes |
|---|---|---|
| E F Armstrong | 1970 | Commonwealth advisor, Gloucestershire |
| K B Clysdale | 1970 | Chief commissioner, Canada |
| Amelia "Milly" Collins MBE (1915-1991) | 1971 | Chair, Diamond Jubilee Coordinating Committee |
| Mary English | 1971 | New Zealand Guide Handbook, author |
| Margaret Turnbull (1907–1986) | 1971 | Chief Commissioner for New Zealand |
| Ena Collymore-Woodstock MBE | 1972 | Chief Commissioner, Jamaica |
| Mary Lambie | 1973 | State Commissioner, South Australia |
| Mrs Allan Laing | 1974 | Deputy Chief Commissioner, GGA |
| W P Gurd | 1976 | Chief Commissioner, Canada |
| Sheila M Crosby | 1978 | Executive Director, Girl Guides of Canada |
| Vivienne Vaughan-Cox OBE | 1978 | Chair, Overseas Committee for Girl Guides. Commissioner in Gibraltar and Malta. |
| Mrs Owen Walker JP | 1979 | Chief Commissioner of GGA |

=== 1980–1989 ===
| Recipient | Year | Notes |
|---|---|---|
| Dr Kathryn Benson-Evans | 1980 | Training advisor, Wales |
| Rosemary Cadbury Dickson | 1980 | Chief commissioner, Ulster |
| Dr Helen Laird OBE, DL (1931-2020) | 1980 | Vice chair, WAGGGS |
| Edna Banham | 1981 | |
| Margaret Coleman | 1981 | Editor, Guiding in Australia magazine |
| T A Dickson JP | 1981 | Chief commissioner, Ulster |
| Mrs Owen John | 1981 | New Zealand guiding |
| Stella Cunliffe (1917–2002) | 1982 | County commissioner, London South West |
| Margaret Walcott | 1983 | General commissioner for special projects, Barbados |
| Aline Fenwick OBE | 1985 | Outstanding service to Guiding in the fields of law and finance, Australia |
| Mary Hill OAM | 1985 | Commissioner for training, WAGGGS |
| Maureen Reid | 1988 | Chief commissioner, Scotland |
| Anne Dunford | 1989 | Deputy chief commissioner |
| Dr June Paterson-Brown CBE | 1989 | Chief commissioner, Commonwealth |

=== 1990–1999 ===
| Margaret Banks | 1990 | Commissioner for Branch Associations |
| June Callaghan | 1990 | Chief commissioner, Ulster |
| Mary Willatt | 1990 | Programme and training advisor |
| Patricia Lawrence | 1990 | Chair of uniform panel |
| Pauline McKie | 1992 | Community involvement and development advisor, County trainer, Staffordshire |
| Ann Mitchell | 1993 | Advisor, British Guides in Foreign Countries |
| Jane Garside | 1994 | Chief commissioner |
| Betty Clay CBE (1917–2004) | 1995 | Active in Guiding in both Northern Rhodesia and England. Daughter of Lord and Lady Baden-Powell. Like her mother she received the only other gold Silver Fish. |
| Elizabeth Ferrier | 1998 | Chair of programme and training for GGA |

=== 2000 onwards ===
| Recipient | Year | Notes |
|---|---|---|
| Dorothy Naylor | 2015 | Special needs advisor, British Guides in Foreign Countries |
| Nicola Grinstead | 2016 | Chair, WAGGGS board of trustees |
| Anne Llywelyn-Jones | 2016 | Advisor, Girlguiding's overseas branches |
| Angela Milln | 2016 | Deputy chief guide |
| Leslie Knighton MBE | 2018 | Chief commissioner, British Girlguiding Overseas |
| Carol Selwyn-Jones | 2020 | Safeguarding leader, British Girlguiding Overseas |
| Melanie Ford MBE | 2024 | County Commissioner, Girlguiding Sussex West, and Lead Volunteer World Association of Girl Guides and Girl Scouts, for services to young people |
| Su Madurasinghe | 2025 | Duke of Edinburgh Award adviser, Girlguiding Cymru |

=== Date of award unknown ===
| Recipient | Year | Notes |
|---|---|---|
| Julia Cobb Crowell (1877–1957) | | First Girl Scout commissioner, Cleveland, USA |
| Countess Gowrie (1879–1965) | | Chief commissioner, New South Wales, Australia |
| Rose Kerr OBE (1882–1994) | | One of the founders of the Rangers; Involved in the formation of WAGGGS |
| Jane Deeter Rippin (1882–1953) | | National director, Girl Scouts of the USA (1919–1930) |
| Elizabeth Whitehurst (1883–1953) | | |
| Alice Behrens (1885–1952) | | First commissioner, first head of training |
| Kari Aas (1886–1978) | | Chief Scout of Norsk Speiderpikeforbund (1927–1935). Designed World Flag |
| A. M. Victoria Rossiter (1887–1977) | | Stores commissioner, |
| Violet Synge (1896–1981) | | Chief commissioner, England |
| Connie Stableford (1901–1987) | | |
| Vera Armstrong MBE (1904–1992) | | Founder, Guide Friendship Fund |
| Beryl Henniker-Hughan (1905–1998) | | Division commissioner |
| Lady Chauvel | | State commissioner, Victoria, Australia |
| W. Coxon | | |
| Mrs Robotham | | India Girl Guides |
| Cicely Douglas (d. 1985) | | Scottish executive committee |
| Gertrude Pakenham-Walsh | | India Girl Guides. She also had a Silver Elephant Award |
| Margaret Wilson (d. 1977) | | Camp trainer |

== See also ==
- Thanks Badge Girl Scouts of USA highest adult honour
- Silver Wolf Award for distinguished service to Scouting in the UK
