= Safiya Abdel Rahman =

Member of the Egyptian Federation for Scouts and Girl Guides

- Known for: Notable member of the Egyptian Federation for Scouts and Girl Guides

Safiya Abdel Rahman (Egyptian Arabic: صفية عبد الرحمن) was a notable member of the Egyptian Federation for Scouts and Girl Guides and was extremely active in sports for girls in Egypt. She was a recipient of the Silver Fish Award in 1965.
