= Mary Cuningham Chater =

English Girl Guide leader and musician (1896–1990)

Mary Chater MBE
- Chater from a 1990 Guider magazine
- Born: 14 January 1896; Middlesex, England
- Died: 25 July 1990 (aged 94); Bideford, Devon, England
- Other name: Chate
- Education: Durham University; Royal College of Music
- Occupations: Composer, editor, Music Advisor to Girl Guides Association

Mary Cuningham Chater, MBE (14 January 1896 – 25 July 1990) was an English composer, author, music advisor to the Girl Guides Association and editor of several Girl Guide songbooks. She was a recipient of the Silver Fish Award, the highest adult honour in Girl Guiding.

== Family and personal life ==
Mary Chater was born in Strawberry Hill, Middlesex on 14 January 1896. She was the third child of Jessie and Leathley Chater. Her father was a glass and lead merchant, the secretary of the London Plate Glass Merchants' Association and a first-class cricketer. Her mother, Jessie Chater, née Bedwell was chair of Littlehampton's District Nursing Association. Chater was baptized on 22 February 1896.

Her eldest brother Alfred Dougan Chater was wounded at the Battle of Neuve Chapelle in 1915; Chater, aged 19, and her mother travelled to Wimereux to visit him in hospital whilst the war continued to the north. One evening she entertained the troops by playing "tunes from London shows, popular ballads and 'Your King and Your Country', a great favorite with the men" on the piano. Her other brother was Guy Leathley Chater (1892 – 1974), a Major in the 1st Norfolk Regiment.

After her father retired in 1927, the family relocated to Littlehampton, West Sussex where they became heavily involved with St James Church.

Chater met Cicely Bertha Hale, Girl Guide leader, suffragette, health visitor and author (1884 – 1981) in 1947. They lived together in Littlehampton from 1950 – 1965, and after that lived next door to each other until Hale's death in 1981. In old age, Chater moved to Kenwith Nursing Home.

== Education ==
Brought up in a musical household - her uncle wrote songs and her mother played the piano and sang - Chater learned the piano from the age of seven. At ten she began to learn the church organ and started composing. She became adept at playing by ear.

She entered Durham University as an unattached student to read music in 1919 where her professor was Joseph Cox Bridge and her examiners included Edward Bairstow. She graduated with a B.Mus in December 1923. During this time she studied viola and composition with the string instrumentalist, organist, author, teacher, composer, inventor of the violinda and water-colourist John Hullah Brown (1875 – 1973).

Chater went on to study at the Royal College of Music from 1926 to 1929, earning an L.R.C.M. Her principal study was composition, under Herbert Howells and her second studies were conducting, under William Henry Reed, Malcolm Sargent and Adrian Boult, orchestration under Gordon Jacob and score reading.

In 1926, Chater was awarded part of the Signor Foli Scholarship, awarded to composition students of at least one year's standing. In 1929 some of her Variations were performed by the Patrons' Fund Orchestra under Adrian Boult.

== Work ==
Chater worked as a music teacher, singer, conductor, and conducting tutor.

From 1942 to 1944 she took charge of Rosemead School, Littlehampton, which, due to its location on the south coast, had become a garrison town with empty houses, buildings and schools serving as lodgings for billeted servicemen. She and a small staff looked after around forty day pupils, sharing their school facilities with the army. She ran the school's choir and Brownie pack.

She served as a justice of the peace for the Arundel Bench from 1945 – 1961.

=== Girl Guides Association ===
Chater joined the Girl Guide movement in 1921 whilst living in Strawberry Hill when she became captain of 1st Fulwell Guide company, Middlesex. Of this, she wrote, "Guiding was an activity completely alien to my mind and capacity. I was impractical, unobservant and rather antipathetic to organisations. However… I was soon well and truly hooked. As my brother Guy said, 'This will either be the making of Mary or the ruin of the Girl Guides.'"

During her Guiding career she was a Guide Captain, Ranger Captain, Camp Advisor and District and Division Commissioner for Littlehampton from 1935 to 1946. In 1935, she became assistant to the Association's Commissioner for Music and Drama, Kitty Streatfeild.

From 1949 -1961 Chater held the position of Music Advisor, Commonwealth Headquarters, Girl Guide Association. In this role she travelled extensively, produced song collections, composed original music for special occasions, tested music instructors, adjudicated festivals, gave talks, accompanied church ceremonies and led campfires.

Musical highlights included conducting the singing at the All-England Ranger Rally at the Royal Albert Hall in 1946, leading 10,000 people in song around a campfire at WAGGGS' 13th World Conference in Oxford, England in 1950 and playing the organ in both St George's Chapel, Windsor and the Royal Albert Hall. She led the singing on board the frigate Foudroyant for Princess Margaret in 1950 and served as Music Advisor on the Girl Guides' Golden Jubilee Committee in July 1960.

In 1953, she visited Canada to direct the music for their National Camp for which she wrote a "well received" song about her experiences whilst there, and also directed the music as part of a "colourful pageant". When visiting Doe Lake, Ontario's Guiding training centre, she fell and broke her arm. The leaders named one of the buildings Chater House. She also visited Guides in Montreal as part of her trip.

In 1951 she received the Silver Fish Award, Guiding's highest adult award, for her role of Music Advisor. She was also awarded an MBE for services to Guiding in 1962.

=== Publications ===
Chater edited and compiled the following songbooks, the vast majority published by the Girl Guides Association:

- The First Book of Camp Fire Songs (1944)
- Fireside Songs in Two Parts: Traditional Tunes for Unaccompanied Equal Voices (1945)
- A Baker's Dozen: 13 Singing Games for Brownies (1947)
- A Brownie's Day (1948) with Joy Faulkner
- Overseas: Songs from the British Commonwealth and Empire (1949)
- International Songs (1950)
- More Fireside Songs in Two Parts: Traditional Tunes for Unaccompanied Voices (1953)
- A Brownie's Dozen: 14 Singing Games and Songs (1955)
- The Sol-fa Songbook for Guides (1956)
- Centenary Souvenir Song Book (1957)
- The Second Book of Campfire Songs (1961)
- Graces and Vespers (1962) with Tirzah Barnes
- Singing Games from Far and Near (1966)

She also authored two books, Music through Guiding Part 1 (1951) and Pathway Over the Hill: The Elements of Guiding (1966) and contributed the music notes for A Collection of Christmas plays for Guides and Brownies (1961) by Anne Fairtlough and Eileen Peake.

=== Compositions ===
- Laura
- The Chief (1956) written for the centenary of BP's birth in 1956
- Guide Marching Song (1948) appeared on the 1971 BBC album 'Singing Along with the Girl Guides'
- Ranger Song (1948)
- A Country Song (1948)
- Mighty Lord and Saviour (1954)
- Trefoil Song
- Sussex Campfire Opening
- St Patrick's Breastplate
- Carillon
- Foxlease Vesper
- A Royal Round
- A Short Grace
- Tony O! (words: Colin Francis)
- What is this life (words: W.H. Davies)
- Ships
- The North Countree (round in 3 parts)
- Serve God Daily (text: Sir John Hawkins, 1532 - 1595)
- The Queen's Grace (text: George Belling, 1585)
- A Brownie's Day (words: Joy Faulkner)
- The Jubilee Song (1960) marking the 50th anniversary of the creating of Girl Guides was recorded by the Band of the Women's Royal Army Corps (WRAC), an all-female military band, conducted by Major McDowall and was privately released by the GGA as a 7" single.

=== Translations ===
- Festival Song (1947) tune: an old French carol. Written for the International Folk Dance Festival with accompaniment by Gustav Holst
- Tuoll on mun kultani (My Sweetheart) from Finnish into English.
- Meunier tu dors (The Miller Sleeps) French into English

=== Arrangements ===
Chater had strong feelings about the quality of many vocal arrangements where "alto parts are too often a dreary shuffle from one note to the next and back again, while descants tend to become too elaborate and to smother the air". She set about writing her own arrangements, which appeared in her own and many other songbooks of the era. Arrangements included:

- Lilliburlero (1936) Pub: OUP Archive
- The National Anthem
- The Queen's Grace (text: George Belling, 1585)
- Guide Grace: Bless this our food (text: Dorothy Kerr)
- Greensleeves
- Will ye no come back again? (text: Lady Nairne)
- New Forest Vesper (additional text: D. Whitehouse)

=== Conducting ===
Chater conducted several Guide groups, including for the BBC's Children's Hour as part of the 1949 and 1950 Thinking Day features.

Outside of Guiding, she established a women's choir called 'The Monday Club' which met at her home. They would perform at the Bognor and Worthing music festivals where Herbert Howells would occasionally judge. She also conducted the Parry Choir.

== See also ==
- YouTube channel 'Songs for Girl Guides and Girl Scouts'
- Leslie's Guiding History
- Janet E Tobitt
