= Iona Taylor =

English Girl Guide leader

- Iona Taylor from a 1951 newspaper
- Born: Iona Marjorie Taylor; 1 April 1908; St Albans, England
- Died: 25 February 1978 (aged 69); Lymington, England
- Occupation: Girl Guide leader

Iona Taylor, JP (1 April 1908 – 25 February 1978) was a Girl Guide Association (GGA) executive and volunteer for the Guide International Service (GIS) in post-war Europe. She was a recipient of the Silver Fish Award, the Girlguiding movement's highest adult award.

== Personal life ==
Iona Marjorie Taylor was born in St Albans to Arthur Enfield Taylor and Olive Marjorie Taylor née Tillard. She had a brother and a sister. Taylor met Anne Bodson from Luxembourg at Our Chalet in Switzerland in the 1930s, after which they became "very close friends". Taylor lived with Bodson and her sister for 40 years. After WWII the three moved to Boldre in Hampshire. She died suddenly aged 69. She had been due to retire from her role as a magistrate on her 70th birthday the following month.

== Early Girl Guiding ==
Taylor joined Girl Guides aged 11 in Harpenden, Hertfordshire, in 1919. In 1925 she started the Redbourn Guide Company. Between 1932 and 1937 she was a guider in Huntingdon.

== World War II ==
Taylor trained in the Women's Transport Service (WTS), part of the First Aid Nursing Yeomanry (FANY), and in 1938 joined the Auxiliary Territorial Service. When war broke out she was called up immediately, initially driving an ambulance in Portsmouth, then on the staff at the Driver Training Centre in Camberley.

== Guide International Service (GIS) ==
Taylor joined the Guide International Service (GIS), an organisation set up by the Girl Guides Association in 1942 with the aim of sending teams of adult Girl Guide leaders into Europe to do relief work after the war ended. Taylor was one of the 198 British volunteers sent to occupied Europe and Malaya between 1945 and 1954.

Taylor's role with the GIS involved looking after displaced people (DPs) in Greece and Germany. In January 1946 she took over from Margaret Pilkington as leader of Hadjikyriakion Hostel in Greece. In October 1946 she took over from Stella Cunliffe in leading Relief Section 107 in Saltzgitter-Gebardshagen, near Neuengamme concentration camp. The site included a hospital and children's home. Her work mostly involved "welfare activities, designed to encourage the DPs to become self-reliant."

== Guiding after GIS ==
After returning from Europe, Taylor moved to Hampshire where she became the county's international Girl Guide representative. In 1947 she became the commissioner for Lymington District and between 1951 and 1961 she served as Hampshire's county commissioner.

In 1957 she welcomed Princess Margaret, Chief Ranger of the British Commonwealth and Empire, to the GGA's training centre, Foxlease. In the same year she was awarded the Silver Fish Award by Anstice Gibbs for her international service and "untiring work" in Hampshire.

When she stepped down from her position as county commissioner, she was presented with a cheque to go towards "a terrace garden" at her new home in Lymington.

Subsequent roles included:

- GGA Training Committee – chair
- A travelling commissioner – setting up Guide companies in new housing estates
- Council of the GGA – member
- GGA executive committee – member
- Foxlease committee – member
- Our Chalet committee – member
- Hampshire Girl Guiding – county president

== Other ==
Taylor organised Meals on Wheels in Boldre. She worked as a magistrate in Lymington for 28 years.
