= Princess Elizabeth and Philip Mountbatten's wedding cakes =

Putting the final touches to the principal wedding cake made by McVitie and Price, from a 1947 newspaper

Princess Elizabeth and Philip Mountbatten were offered many cakes from well-wishers around the world for their wedding on 20 November 1947. Of these they accepted 12. The principal, 'official' cake, served at the wedding breakfast, was baked by the Scottish biscuit maker, McVitie and Price. The other 11 cakes – from prominent confectionary firms and smaller, family-run bakers – were displayed on "specially strengthened tables" in Buckingham Palace's 20-metre long Blue Drawing Room, and distributed to charitable organisations after the wedding. All the cakes were delivered to Buckingham Palace the day before the wedding ceremony, with Princess Elizabeth greeting each arrival personally.

== Twelve wedding cakes ==
The following businesses and organisations provided a wedding cake with their gifts recorded in the St James's publication Marriage of Her Royal Highness the Princess Elizabeth and Lieutenant Philip Mountbatten Royal: List of Wedding Gifts:

- Bollands Ltd, Chester
- British Cake and Biscuit Association
- Country Women's Association of Australia
- Huntley and Palmers Ltd, Reading
- J Lyons and Co. Ltd, London
- J W Mackie and Sons Ltd, Edinburgh
- McVitie and Price Ltd, Edinburgh
- Peek Freans and Co. Ltd, London
- Real and Holton, Somerset
- W F Robson
- W & R Jacob Ltd, Liverpool
- Ulster Menu Company Ltd, Belfast

== Post-war rationing ==
Because of serious food shortages in post-war Britain, the royal couple felt it was "impossible to accept further offers" beyond 12 cakes. (In comparison, when Queen Victoria married in 1840, she received over 100 wedding cakes). Despite her royal status, Princess Elizabeth required a licence from the Board of Trade to serve wedding cake. To get around food rationing, ingredients for several of the cakes came from Commonwealth countries including Australia, New Zealand, Canada, Jamaica and Barbados. To meet the Princess' wish "to observe austerity conditions" the principal cake was considerably reduced in size from its original design. It was four tiers, standing 2.7 metres high and weighing 226 kg (the cake served for the wedding of her parents, King George VI and Queen Elizabeth, weighed 362 kg).

== Recipients of the cake ==
Other than the McVitie and Price cake, which was eaten at the wedding breakfast, the 11 other cakes were distributed among charitable organisations, including institutions, hospitals and schools of which the Princess was president or patron. Other recipients included staff at the royal family's residences, and those at Broadlands, a stately home in Hampshire, England, where the couple spent the first part of their honeymoon. Five hundred pieces of cake were distributed to the couple's personal friends. The remaining cake was sent to Girl Guides and Sea Rangers in Britain and Australia, the Girl Guides of Australia having contributed the majority of the ingredients to the principal cake. One tier was saved for the christening of Prince Charles in 1948.

== McVitie and Price, London – the principal cake ==
McVitie and Price (now McVities, owned by United Biscuits) created the official four-tiered wedding cake in their London factory. The couple had visited their Edinburgh factory in mid-March.

Details of the cake design were kept secret, with the Princess wishing that they "not be made known until the wedding day". However, the cake was put on private view for select visitors in their London factory on 15 November, where invited guests watched Frederick E Schur, the company's chief confectioner, put final touches to the decoration. The day before the wedding, the cake was delivered to Buckingham Palace in a pantechnicon, escorted by a "courtesy cop" together with six men inside the van.

=== Ingredients from Girl Guides of Australia ===
An Australian Girl Guide and leaders with their gift of cake ingredients, from a 1947 newspaper

As rationing was still in effect in post-war Britain, ingredients were hard to source within the United Kingdom. Princess Elizabeth, having recently accepted the title from the Girl Guides Association of Chief Ranger of the British Empire, received 88% of the ingredients for the principal cake as a gift from the Girl Guides of Australia. 25,000 Australian Brownies, Guides and Rangers contributed one penny each. Of the gift, Queensland's State Commissioner, Lilian Gresham, said "Australian Guides had made this offer because they felt that the Princess was one of them." It was a "hastily prepared parcel" with a cable requesting assistance having been received in Australia only the week before it was shipped.

The full list of ingredients, featured in the October 1947 edition of Australian Girl Guide's magazine Matilda, were: "56lb bag icing sugar, 70lb castor sugar, 50lb bag plain flour, 6 tins powdered milk, 10oz ground cinnamon, 10oz mixed spice, 6 bottles lemon essence, 1 tin almond meal, 60lb sultanas, 10lb lemon peel, 15lb seeded raisins, 10lb crystalised cherries, 12lb currants, 7lb self-raising flour, 1 bottle best Australian brandy, 20lb brown sugar, 10lb almond kernels, 12 dozen eggs, 30lb butter."

Seven crates of ingredients were transported to the UK on the SS Stratheden on 14 August 1947, with the shipping firm providing "special refrigeration… for the cases containing the eggs and butter". The precious cargo arrived in London one month later. The federal commissioner of Australia, Irene Fairbairn received a letter of thanks from Princess Elizabeth's Lady-in-waiting, Lady Margaret Egerton, which read "Her Royal Highness deeply appreciated the thought which prompted the offer of this most generous and acceptable gift."

Other contributions to the principal cake were flour from Canada and rum and brown sugar from Jamaica. The cake earned the nickname 'The 10,000 Mile Cake'. It also contained 80 oranges and lemons, over 13 litres of Navy Rum, and curacao. The cake was left to mature for eight weeks after baking. It produced 2,000 slices. McVitie and Price's recipe, at the Princess' wish, remained always a secret.

==== South Africa ====
In July 1947 there was a movement in Johannesburg for the ingredients for the principal cake to be supplied by South Africa, as "the ingredients [were] more readily procurable in South Africa than anywhere else in the Empire", and that the cake should be baked there and then flown to London for icing and decorating. This did not happen, with the majority of the ingredients coming from Australia instead.

=== Decoration ===
The cake's four tiers were supported by silver pillars, with the bottom tier resting on a solid silver base measuring one metre across. The same base had been used at the wedding of Princess Elizabeth's parents and grandparents. Images and decorations on each of the four tiers were as follows:

- First tier (base): bride's and groom's crests, Windsor Castle, Buckingham Palace, Balmoral Castle
- Second tier: casket presented to a Freeman of Windsor, Princess Elizabeth taking the salute as Colonel-in-Chief of the Grenadier Guards, a night scene from the Battle of Cape Matapan (Mountbatten's first naval action, where he was in charge of searchlight control), musical emblems, tennis, cricket, sailing, athletics and racing, with the King's colours
- Third tier: cupid holding shields with initials of the bride and groom, crest of the Royal Navy, badge of the Auxiliary Territorial Service, badge of the Girl Guides and Sea Rangers, a painting of HMS Valiant
- Fourth tier: badges of Australia, Canada, South Africa, New Zealand, India, Pakistan

Standing on the fourth tier was a globe, carrying the names of all the countries within the British Commonwealth and a silver Quaich, a Scottish drinking cup, holding fresh camellias and white roses.

Icing the cake took five and a half weeks and involved creating 700 piped 'off-pieces' that were made separately then attached to the cake, together with "numerous spares" in case of emergency. Several of the off-pieces were carved by Vincent New, a draughtsman at the Admiralty. He carved the designs into wax and these impressions were then cast in sugar.

=== Cutting the cake ===
A section of cake from the bottom tier was pre-cut, surrounded by a loop of ribbon then replaced, to enable a wedge of cake to be easily pulled out as the couple cut. The wedge contained seven lucky charms: a bachelor button, a wedding ring, a donkey, a threepenny bit, a thimble, a wish-bone and a horseshoe. The couple cut the cake using the sword that Mountbatten had worn at the ceremony, his having received it as a wedding gift from the King.

=== Le Cordon Bleu School, London, recreation in 2016 ===
In 2016 Le Cordon Bleu School, London, was approached by commercial broadcaster ITV about recreating the principal wedding cake for a television documentary. They agreed, and A Very Royal Wedding aired in 2017. The project was led by the school's Head of Pâtisserie, chef Julie Walsh. McVities were able to provide archive resources to help with the size and the intricate decorations. The school created a dummy version from polystyrene to check the proportions. The largest of the tiers took 13 hours to bake.

As McVitie and Price's original recipe was unknown, and possibly destroyed in a fire at their factory, Walsh and her team had to piece together details from a variety of sources. They used "60 lb butter, 55 lb sugar, 750 eggs, 80 lemons, 80 oranges, 3 litres Navy rum, 340 lb sultanas, raisins, cherries and spices, 150 lb marzipan and 110 lb icing sugar".

== Bollands of Chester ==
Bollands had provided cakes for Queen Victoria and King George VI. Their cake for Princess Elizabeth was a three-tier cake weighing 27 kg and supported by hand-carved pillars, together with four gilded "heraldry-style" lions, was presented by representatives of Bollands. The design included piped thistles and roses, the Royal coat of arms, Naval emblems and an anchor with a crown.

== British Cake and Biscuit Manufacturers' Association ==
A three-tiered cake was made by C H Elkes and Sons of Uttoxeter on behalf of the British Cake and Biscuit Manufacturers' Association. It stood 1.6 metres high and had an "edible weight" of 188 kg. Its creation was overseen by S H Elkes MBE, together with chief decorator J H Hutchinson and chief chemist W H Smith.

All the ingredients came from the British Empire: flour from the UK, butter from New Zealand, sugar from Barbados, eggs from Canada and Northern Ireland, currants and sultanas from Australia, brandy from South Africa and rum from Jamaica.

Decorations included family crests, the couple's coats of arms and crests of Australia, Canada, New Zealand and South Africa. The cake was topped with an exact replica of the Eros statue from Piccadilly Circus.

The cake was given structural integrity by the addition of steel rods with pillar drums between the tiers.

== Country Women's Association of Australia ==
Country Women's Association's wedding cake, from a 1947 newspaper

The Country Women's Association gave a six-tiered wedding cake that stood 1.5m high. The tiers represented the six federated States, each of which donated ingredients. The finished cake was decorated with the Australian coat of arms on each side, plus sprigs of silver bracken fern, wedding bells and a spray of fresh white flowers in a silver vase on the top.

The icing, spiced with rum from Bundaberg, Queensland, was made by D de Mars, an instructor in cake decoration at East Sydney Technical College. He spent eight days inlaying the four plaques of the Australian coat of arms at the base of the cake. It was baked in Sydney by the head chef at David Jones, Sydney's leading department store.

The six tiers were flown to London in separate airtight tins in October 1947, for the wedding the following month. At least one of the tiers was damaged en route when the plane carrying the cake landed at Lydda Airport (now Ben Gurion Airport) in Israel. The local police called in pastry chef Shaul Petrushka, who made good the damage before the cake continued its journey to London.

== Huntley and Palmer, Reading ==
Jack Bryant preparing decorative panels for the Huntley and Palmer wedding cake, from a 1947 newspaper

This four-tiered hexagonal cake was originally intended to weigh 181 kg, but was reduced to 88 kg at the request of the Palace. It was still one of the largest of the 'unofficial' wedding cakes. The cake was designed and overseen by Jack Bryant. The ingredients were provided by "the Dominions, Colonies and Dependencies" and the cake took an estimated 210 hours to create. Huntley and Palmer had used the same recipe for nearly 100 years, including commissions from royal families, including those of "Indian rajahs and other foreign potentates".

=== Design ===
This cake featured plaster of Paris cupids, each holding a bell in one hand and a large letter in the other. Made by the sculptor Frederick Marland of Parliament Hill, the cupids were placed around the cake. 144 off-pieces were used for the collars, side panels, flanges and balustrades. The second tier depicted the Battle of Cape Matapan, and the granting of Princess Elizabeth the Freedom of Windsor. The fourth tier displayed Commonwealth crests.

=== Public Display ===
Huntley and Palmer received permission to display the cake at their head office in Reading before the wedding. With viewings offered at sixpence per head, all money raised was donated to the Royal Naval and the Women's Royal Naval Service Benevolent Trusts. Over 14,000 people viewed the cake.

A replica of the cake then toured the UK, accompanied by photos of the royal wedding, stopping at Manchester, Newcastle, Liverpool, Nottingham, Bournemouth and Cardiff.

== J Lyons and Co. London ==
John Wedgwood, of Josiah Wedgwood and Sons, admiring the J Lyons wedding cake, from a 1947 newspaper

This three-tiered cake, mounted on a silver stand was made by F E Jacobs, chief decorator of J Lyons' Ornamental Department. It stood 1.8 metres high and weighed 63 kg.

The first and second tiers featured specially commissioned 10 cm blue and white Wedgwood Jasper vases set in alcoves behind silver pillars, with smaller vases on the third tier. These were designed by Victor Skellen, the art director at Josiah Wedgwood and Sons' Barlaston pottery, and were the first to have been made since the war. The Jasper vases featured a 1775 design by John Flaxman called 'The Dancing Hours'.

The cake's panels depicted Princess Elizabeth's coat of arms, the couple's initials and a Naval crown. Atop the third tier sat a larger Jasper vase, filled with fresh flowers and trailing orange blossom.

== J W Mackie and Sons, Edinburgh ==
This four-tiered cake, weighing 54 kg and standing 1.8 metres high was made by bakery manager, Mr Patterson. The design was inspired by the Scott Monument, which stands on Princes Street Gardens, Edinburgh. It depicted the Princess' coat of arms and the Royal Standard of Scotland, and featured 12 cm china cupids at the corners of each tier.

== Peek Freans & Co. London ==
Peek Frean's wedding cake from a 1947 magazine

This all-white cake was completely edible, except for a solid silver statue of St George on the top. It was made using ingredients from around the Empire donated by Britons overseas. Panels depicted the Princess' arms, Glamis Castle, St George's Chapel, Windsor Castle, HMS Vanguard and the Royal Naval College, Dartmouth.

== Real and Holton, Somerset ==
This three-tiered cake was baked by Frank Hill of Real and Holton (later Sparkes of Cary) at their small, family-owned bakery in Castle Cary, Somerset. The bakers invited all the inhabitants of the small market town to stir the mixture before it was put into the oven. The cake was decorated with four real silver slippers, containing white sprigs of imitation lily of the valley, Princess Elizabeth's favourite flowers.

A return journey from Castle Carey to London to deliver the cake would have used up a six-week ration of petrol coupons. However, the owner of the bakery, William Sparkes, received an anonymous donation of RAC coupons, making the journey possible.

Although the 11 'unofficial' cakes were intended for donation following the wedding, the Real and Holton cake never left Buckingham Palace. The royal family decided to keep it for themselves, as the flowers decorating the top tier were pink carnations, "the favourite flowers of the bride's grandmother Queen Mary." In a conversation with William Sparkes' daughter in 1993, Princess Anne wondered whether the top tier had been kept and used as a Christening cake.

== Ulster Menu Company, Belfast ==
Ulster Menu Company's cake for the royal wedding, from a 1947 newspaper

This four-tiered cake was made by John Hood using an "old family recipe", and decorated by William Brown. It weighed 45 kg and stood 1.5 metres high. Each tier represented one of the four main industries of Northern Ireland:

- First tier: Shipbuilding, with hand-painted plaques showing ships. Placed on top of the tier itself was a model of HMS Eagle, an aircraft carrier that Princess Elizabeth had launched the previous year.
- Second tier: Agriculture, with plaques showing images of farming and farm life
- Third tier: Linen manufacture, with plaques depicting women sat at spinning wheels
- Fourth tier: Rope-making

On the top of the top tier was a white easel with "E.P." in silver and a silver crown.

== Replica ==
A 24 kg replica of one of the wedding cakes was stolen while on display at a dance on board an American cruise ship.

== Other cake-related gift ==
- F M Findrey of Cheltenham sent Princess Elizabeth a packet containing crumbs from Queen Victoria's wedding cake, from her marriage on 10 February 1840.
