= Elsa Riepert =

Canadian Girl Guide leader

- Elsa Riepert from a 1942 newspaper
- Born: 13 February 1890; Montreal, Quebec, Canada
- Died: 15 June 1961 (aged 71); Westchester County, New York, U.S.
- Occupation: Girl Guide leader

Elsa Augusta J. Riepert (13 February 1890 - 15 June 1961) was active in both Girl Guides of Canada and Girl Scouts of the USA. She received the highest award for adults from both movements, the Silver Fish Award from Girl Guides and the Thanks Badge from GSUSA.

== Personal life ==
Elsa Augusta J. Riepert was born in Montreal to Frederick Herman Riepert and Ebba Sofia Carolina Sjostrom. She graduated from Patchogue High School, Brooklyn in 1907 and in 1915 passed the Miami county examinations to qualify as a second grade teacher. Over the next 25 years she lived and worked in New York, Boston, Montreal and Toronto.

Riepert moved to America in 1942 and between 1945 and 1950 lived in Mamaroneck, New York, with her sister Mrs A R Hatch. In 1948 she was listed as the owner of a Cocker Spaniel, Captain Jinks of Jeera, in The American Kennel Club Stud Book Register. In the same year she was elected secretary of the Woman's Club of Mamaroneck. In 1950 she moved to New Orleans with her sister, where she was the secretary of the League of Women Voters of New Orleans for nine years.

Riepert died at home in Westchester, New York, in 1961 and was interred at Patchogue, NY.

== Girl Guides and Girl Scouts ==
In 1910 Riepert was general secretary of the Canadian Council, GGA. Ten years later she was elected as dominion secretary of the Girl Guides in Canada, holding the position for 21 years, stepping down in 1941.

In this role she traveled to England in 1934, bringing back a White Ensign of the Royal Navy, one of the flags that had been retired from their role at London's Cenotaph, donated to the Imperial War Museum and subsequently redistributed to relevant organisations around the world, including the Imperial Girl Guides Association.

She attended training at Foxlease, Girl Guiding's UK training centre, in the New Forest, and Camp Edith Macy, the Girl Scouting equivalent in Pleasantville, New York. Riepert was a delegate at the 10th WAGGGS World Conference in Adelboden, Switzerland in 1938. She served on the staff at the Canadian National Camp in New Brunswick. As part of her role she would train Girl Scouts in singing or accompany them on the piano. One of her favourite themes when presenting or training was international friendship.

In 1942 she moved to the US and was installed as executive secretary of the Girl Scouts Shore Council at Asbury Park, New Jersey, which had been established five years previously. She was Camp Director for the Council in 1943 and 1944, resigning from the Council in 1945 due to ill health.

Whilst living in Marmaroneck with her sister, she became program chair for Mamaroneck Girl Scout Council in 1946 and Training Chair in 1947.

== Awards ==
- 1939 – Silver Fish Award, Girl Guiding's highest adult honour
- 1950 – Thanks Badge, Girl Scouts of the USA's highest adult honour
