= Leathley Chater =

English cricketer

Personal information
- Full name: Leathley Chater
- Born: 23 December 1858; Camberwell, Surrey, England
- Died: 5 May 1931 (aged 72); Littlehampton, Sussex, England
- Batting: Right-handed

Domestic team information
- Years: Team
- 1881: Marylebone Cricket Club

Career statistics
Competition	First-class
Matches	1
Runs scored	6
Batting average	–
100s/50s	–/–
Top score	6*
Catches/stumpings	–/–
- Source: Cricinfo, 30 August 2021

Leathley Chater (23 December 1858 — 5 May 1931) was an English first-class cricketer.

The son of Henry Chater, he was born at Camberwell in December 1858. He was educated at Harrow School, where he played for the cricket eleven in his final year. He later made a single appearance in first-class cricket for the Marylebone Cricket Club (MCC) against Hampshire at Southampton in 1881. Batting once in the match, he ended the MCC's first innings of 106 all out unbeaten on 6. He was by profession a merchant. Leathley died at Littlehampton in May 1931, where he had moved to in 1927. He was survived by his wife, Jessie and daughter Mary Cuningham Chater.
