= Vera Armstrong =

English Girl Guide leader (1904–1992)

Vera Armstrong MBE
- Armstrong from a 1992 issue of The Guider
- Born: 22 April 1904; Huddersfield, England
- Died: 19 April 1992 (aged 87); Gloucestershire, England
- Education: Cheltenham Ladies' College
- Occupations: Girl Guide leader Author
- Spouses: Richard Shirley Tain (m. 1934); Edward Francis Egerton Armstrong CBE (m. 1946)

Vera Armstrong MBE (22 April 1904 – 18 April 1992) was a British children's author and member of the Girl Guide movement for six decades. She established the Guide Friendship Fund in 1964. She was a recipient of the Silver Fish Award, the movement's highest adult honour.

== Personal life ==
Mary Vera Marshall was born in Huddersfield on 22 April 1904, the second child of Catherine Elsie and William Lawrence Wright Marshall. She attended Cheltenham Ladies' College. She played tennis at Wimbledon.

She married Richard Shirley Tain, a soldier in the Royal Engineers, in Cheltenham in 1934. after which they moved to India. During WWII she was a Junior Commander in the Auxiliary Territorial Service. By 1946 her marriage had ended and she had married Brigadier Edward Francis Egerton Armstrong CBE (1890-1995). After WWII they spent time in India. They moved to Gloucestershire in 1966.

== Girl Guide career ==
Armstrong was a Brownie in Devon. By 1933 she was a Guide captain in Hull, and in 1947 she became the first district commissioner of the newly created Paddington district, where her "untiring energies" ensured that Paddington was in the "van of Girl Guiding in London". In 1948 she was working at Girl Guide Headquarters. When her husband's army role took them both to India in September 1949, she resigned her position in the UK, with the intention to take up Guiding on her arrival in India.

In the 1950s she edited a Girl Guide's educational film, The Wider World, and became a member of the Rangers Overseas National Committee. in 1953 she was Hon. secretary of the Guide Coronation tribute. In 1957 she made a film at the international camp in Windsor Great Park to mark the centenary of the birth of Lord Baden-Powell. From 1954 – 1966 she edited the Girl Guide magazine, The Trefoil.

While working at Girl Guide Headquarters in 1964, she founded the Guide Friendship Fund (GFF), which continues to this day to offer financial help to Guides overseas. In the early 1970s she was Honorary secretary of the fund. She was also an overseas representative on the international committee at the Guides' Commonwealth headquarters. In 1984 she became an early member of the Olave Baden-Powell Society, set up in 1983 to support the mission of World Association of Girl Guides and Girl Scouts (WAGGGS) through fundraising and mentorship of young leaders. In 1986 she was Mid-Gloucestershire Guides divisional president.

In lieu of flowers at her funeral, Armstrong asked for donations to the Girl Guides Association.

== Author ==
She published a range of books, mostly although not exclusively about Guiding, under her maiden name, Vera M Marshall, and her second married name, M Vera Armstrong.

- Arithmetic for Girls (1930) with Enid Mary Barratt. Edited by H E J Curzon
- The Quest of the Sleuth Patrol (1931)
- Tracks to Adventure: A Series of Tracking Adventures (1932)
- Tracks to the Queen's Guide (1948)
- Biddy The Brownie (1949) Illustrated by Hilda Boswell
- Twenty Tales (1949)
- Rival Camps (1950)
- Maris of Glenside (1953)
- Trefoil Tales: True Stories of how the Girl Guide movement grew up (1956) with Alix Liddell and Elizabeth Hill. Illustrated by Jennetta Vise.

=== Awards ===
- 1949: Beaver award
- 1970: Silver Fish award, Girl Guiding's highest award for adults, for encouraging the movement overseas.
- 1975: MBE for services to the Girl Guides Association
