= Kari Aas =

Norwegian teacher and Scout leader (1886–1978)

- Office: Chief Scout of the Norsk Speiderpikeforbund
- Term: 1927–1935

Karen Marta Inanda "Kari" Aas (6 October 1886 in Farsund – 2 January 1978) was a Norwegian teacher and Scout leader, and served as the Chief Scout of the Norsk Speiderpikeforbund from 1927 to 1935.

== Background ==
Aas graduated from teacher's college in Tromsø and found work as a teacher there in 1909. In 1910 she moved to Trondheim. Aas was a member of the Trondheim school board and executive board Trondhjems konsertforening, the Trondheim concert association.

Aas attended the 1928 World Scout Conference in Budapest as one of the Norwegian delegates, and was a witness to the first casting of B-P's footprint, documented in her memoirs. She designed the World Trefoil emblem of the World Association of Girl Guides and Girl Scouts that was adopted at the World Conference in 1930, a gold trefoil on a blue background.

Aas wrote several books about Scouting and was the recipient of the Silver Fish Award.
