= Florence Mitchell =

Australian Girl Guide leader

- Born: 1891; Redfern, New South Wales
- Died: 15 October 1973 (aged 67); Toorak, Victoria
- Occupation: Australian Girl Guide leader

Florence Mitchell (1891 - 20 July 1970) was assistant state commissioner for Victoria Girl Guides, Australia from 1949 to 1953. In 1953 she received the Silver Fish Award, Girl Guiding's highest adult honour, for her contribution to Guiding, including her work with the Guide International Service (GIS) after WWII.

== Personal life ==
Florence Isobel Mitchell was born to John and Mary Mitchell. She had two brothers and one sister. She grew up in East Malvern, Melbourne. Mitchell attended Presbyterian Ladies' College, Melbourne, in later life becoming the joint secretary, together with Esna Boyd, of the school's old girls’ society, Old Collegians.

During her lifetime she lived in many towns in Victoria, including Kooyong, Malvern, Lalor and Toorak. Mitchell had a brother, Tom. In 1938 they were described by a gossip columnist as “that popular brother and sister” in Melbourne magazine Table Table. Both were keen amateur golf players.

In 1927 Mitchell was involved in an “exciting motor chase” when someone flagged her down to pursue a hit-and-run driver who had knocked over and killed a 53-year-old man.

=== Travel ===
In 1926 Mitchell was one of seven teachers from the Victorian Education department who travelled to England on an exchange scheme. She worked at a school in London.

Mitchell spent 1934 dividing her time between Spain and England. While in England she stayed with Esna Boyd, her college friend and former Australian tennis champion. Mitchell found herself in Spain during the revolution of 1934, about which she said, “there was a fearful atmosphere in the city [Madrid], but we could speak no Spanish and we did not know there were any riots until we received urgent telegrams from England telling us to get out of Spain at all costs.”

Between 1938 and 1939 she and her brother Tom travelled together to Britain, America and Rhodesia for 6 months.

=== Royal Agricultural Society ===
Mitchell's family was heavily involved in the Royal Agricultural Society of Victoria (RASV). Her father and brothers John and Tom all served on the council. Tom was president in the 1950s and Mitchell would frequently host Tom's guests during Royal Shows, and accompany him on visits. Her father owned an agricultural implement and machinery business, which was inherited by Tom.

== Girl Guides ==
Mitchell was the district commissioner for Melbourne's East Malvern and Glen Iris Girl Guide district from 1930 to 1938. During a 1933 trip to England she visited Waddow Hall Guide centre and the Girl Guide Association's headquarters in London. After her district commissioner role, she was promoted to commissioner for South-eastern Division, Melbourne, a position she held until 1949. In 1949 she became Assistant State Commissioner for Victorian Girl Guides, a position she held until 1953. In 1953 she received the Silver Fish Award, Girl Guiding's highest adult honour. By this time she was also chair of the Victoria Girl Guides’ finance committee.

=== Guide International Service ===
During and immediately after WWII, Mitchell worked with the Guide International Service (GIS), a voluntary organisation responsible for equipping and sending Girl Guide leaders from Britain and other Commonwealth countries to perform relief work in post-war Europe. She was also involved in the collection and dispatch of clothing and goods for distribution from Victoria to war-affected regions. By 1947 she had become the president of the Victorian GIS committee.
