= Jennetta Vise =

British illustrator (1912–1979)

- Born: Marjory Jeannetta Blythe Vise; 9 September 1912; Chichester, England
- Died: 26 October 1979 (aged 67)
- Education: Ecole des Beaux-Arts; The Sorbonne
- Occupation: Illustrator
- Parent: Toye Vise

Jennetta Vise FSZ (9 September 1912 – 26 October 1979) was an English book, comic and magazine illustrator. Her work appeared in publications such as Mary Grannan's Just Mary series, Robin annuals and many publications for the Girl Guides Association.

== Personal life ==
Marjory Jeannetta Blythe Vise was born in Chichester to father Reginald Toye Vise, a journalist, and mother Ethel Maude (née Badrick). She had an older sister, Barbara, who became assistant editor at Modern Woman magazine. Vise studied at L’Ecole des Beaux Arts and the Sorbonne. She lived in London until 1975 and was a member of The Women's Press Club. She died at home in Sussex.

== Illustrator ==
At the age of 18 Vise illustrated an article by her father, about which Tatler commented that people would “appreciate the skill of the two artists responsible for this joint word and pencil picture, which has quite a butterfly-like touch.” She was represented by Grestock and Marsh, London.

=== Girl Guides ===
After “being discovered” by Margaret Playle, the general editor for the Girl Guide Association (GGA), Vise illustrated the following publications:

- The Big Test: The Story of the Girl Guides in the World War by Christian Catherine (1947)
- The Girl Guide Annual by Girl Guides Association (1951)
- The Brownie Pack: A Handbook for Brownie Guiders by Ailsa Brambleby (1956)
- The True Book about Girl Guides by Alix Liddell (1956)
- Trefoil Tales by Alix Liddell, Vera Armstrong and Elizabeth Hill (1957)
- The Brownies’ Annual by Girl Guides Association (1959, 1962, 1963)
- The Golden Bar Book of Brownie Stories by Robert Moss (1961)
- Three for Trouble by Ailsa Brambleby (1963)
- Three for Pack Holiday by Ailsa Brambleby (1964)
- The Brownie Book by Girl Guides Association New Zealand (1965)
- The Brownie Book, by Ailsa Brambleby (1965)
- The Brownie Guide Handbook by Ailsa Brambleby (1968)
- Musical Fun with the Brownie Pack by Hettie Smith (1976) ISBN 978-0852600733

=== Other selected publications ===
- Out of Town by A. A. Thomson (1935)
- What About a Family? by Lou Chaloner (1944)
- The Noddles Again by Madeleine Collier (1944)
- London Lover by Trevor Allen (1948)
- Savoyard Scrapbook by W S Gilbert for the D’Oyly Carte Opera Company (1948)
- Fables for Children by Irene Pearl (1948)
- Christina’s Fairy Book by Ford Madox Ford (1949)
- The Purple Muffin the Mule Book by Annette Mills (1953)
- The Scottish Pupil’s Spelling Book (1955)
- The Helpful Giant by Eileen Arthurton (1957)
- Fluent French Comedies by Charles S Elston (1958)
- Just Mary Stories by Mary Grannan (1958)
- More Just Mary Stories by Mary Grannan (1959)
- Better Spoken English by Geoffrey Barnard (1959)
- Wild Rose of the King’s Chase by Hilda Moss (1960)
- Gay Way Picture Dictionary (1961)
- Measuring is Fun by Frederick J Vickery (1961)
- The Story of Porky Peek by Elizabeth Maitland (1963)
- The Little Red Bus; The New Bed; No Hat! and Plum Pie by Miss Read (1964)
- Cluck, the Little Black Hen; Hob and The Horse-Bat by Miss Read (1965)
- The Old Shoe House by Ella Ruth Boyce (1966)
- Soucoupes Volantes!! by R N Allan (1966)

=== Magazines ===
- Homes & Gardens
- Modern Woman
- Argosy
- Pippin, including contributions to the original Andy Pandy strip
- Child Education, including craft articles co-authored by Madeleine Collier

== Other work ==
In 1935 she decorated a miniature rocking horse that was presented to British circus owner Bertram Mills by the Royal Veterinary College in recognition of his service to animals.
