= Alice Behrens =

British Girl Guide leader (1885–1952)

Alice Behrens Gaddum
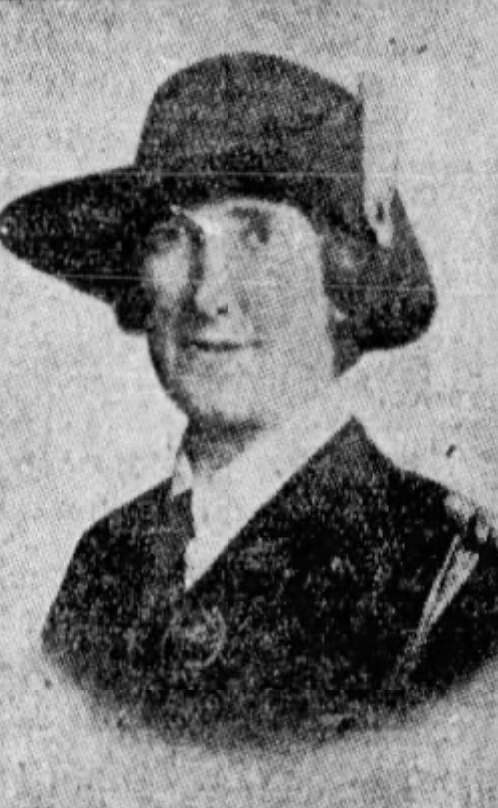
- Behrens from a 1927 newspaper
- Born: Alice Muriel Behrens; 23 April 1885; Dunham Massey, Altrincham, Cheshire, England
- Died: 28 June 1952 (aged 67); Pembroke, Pembrokeshire, Wales
- Other names: Mrs Arthur Gaddum; Lady Behrens
- Spouse: Arthur Graham Gaddum (m. 1929)
- Children: 1
- Parent(s): Sir Charles Behrens and Emily, Lady Behrens

Alice Gaddum née Behrens (23 April 1885 - 28 June 1952) was Girl Guiding pioneer, becoming the movement's first de facto commissioner in 1914. She was an early head of training, oversaw the senior Guides, which would evolve into Rangers and was the first Guider-in-Charge at Foxlease. She was a recipient of the Silver Fish Award, the Girl Guide movement's highest adult honour.

== Personal life ==
Born to Sir Charles and Lady Emily Behrens, Alice was the youngest of three sisters. She married neighbour and Scout commissioner Arthur Gaddum (1874-1948) in 1929, moving to Cheshire, close to both their former homes. They had one daughter. Around 1933 they moved to Orielton House on the Pembrokeshire coast where Gaddum took a keen interest in supporting the local hospital. Arthur died in 1948. In her later years she suffered ill health and became blind.

== Girl Guides ==
Alice joined the Girl Guides in 1913 where she met and learnt from Lord Baden-Powell. With encouragement from Helen Malcolm, she became the first de facto commissioner for Guides in Manchester, Salford and district, "even before that position as such had been invented," the movement's still being in its "chrysalis stage." Between 1913 and 1915 the number of Guides in the region increased from 200 to 2,000.

In August 1914 she organised a Hadfield Girl Guide centre at the Ancoats University Settlement which functioned as a "modified labour bureau". Guides volunteered their time in a variety of ways as part of the war effort, including clerical work, cleaning and acting as "patients" for trainee nurses to practice on.

In 1915, Baden-Powell asked Gaddum to arrange a conference of the approximately 25 commissioners located around Britain. It was held in Matlock, Derbyshire the following year. After Olave Baden-Powell became the movement's first chief commissioner, she "sought [Gaddum's] advice unceasingly." In 1916 she devised and arranged a "Challenge Shield" – a competition featuring a broad range of challenges - for 110 Manchester Guide companies. Gaddum subsequently became the Girl Guides' first head of training, and in 1917 oversaw the senior Guides (a forerunner to today's Rangers). She also served as East Lancashire's county commissioner, deputy chief commissioner of the north of England, head of training for headquarters and a member of the central executive committee. She became the first person from the London headquarters to visit Southern Rhodesia in an official capacity after it started Guiding in 1919. In Australia she trained leaders who would go on to volunteer with the Guide International Service after WWII. She published The Girl Guides' Book of Games in 1920.

When Foxlease was donated to the movement by Mrs Archbold, Gaddum became its first Guider-in-charge in 1922. She subsequently travelled internationally working with Guides in Australia, New Zealand, Canada and South Africa. In 1924 she was responsible for the programme of a world camp held at Foxlease. She served as Girl Guides' chief commissioner for South-East Lancashire from 1914 to 1935.

After her marriage in 1929 she cut back on her Guiding duties but remained a member of the headquarters council. In November 1952, following her death, the Mrs. Gaddum Memorial Fund was established.
