= Janet E. Tobitt =

British-American musician, author and scout (1898–1984)

Janet Tobitt
- Janet E. Tobitt from a 1953 newspaper
- Born: 24 March 1898; Reading, England
- Died: 19 February 1984 (aged 85); New York, USA
- Other name: Toby
- Occupation: Girl Guide leader

Janet Tobitt (24 March 1898 – 19 February 1984), also known as Toby, was a British-American author, editor, publisher, music director, collector of folk songs and dances, playwright, teacher, Girl Guide and Girl Scout leader and shepherd's pipe player.

== Family and education ==
Janet Evelyn Tobitt was born in Reading, Berkshire, UK. She was the first child of Percy Wesley Tobitt, a commercial traveller for Anglo American Oil Co. and Janet Tobitt, née Day. She had family in Ohio and Kentucky. She attended St. Joseph's High School in Reading. She received an LLA (Lady Literate in Arts) diploma from the University of St Andrews in 1922 and graduated from King's College London with a B.A. Pass in 1923. From 1923 to 1924, she studied at the Sorbonne, and then privately in Switzerland.

== England: 1924–1929 ==
Upon completion of her studies, Tobitt's principal employment was as a teacher in various schools in England and on the continent and as a music educator. She spent one year on the staff of The Times. Tobitt was a leader with 1st Hurst Green Girl Guides and was also a Brown Owl in East Sussex. She served as Assistant Camp Director and spent six months as Assistant Island Commissioner in Malta. Through these roles, she discovered that folk songs and dances were well suited to the needs of youth groups, and began collecting them whilst travelling in Europe. She was a member of London's Royal Choral Society and the Robertsbridge Minstrels.

== Between England and USA: 1930–1939 ==
Tobitt travelled to America for the first time in October 1929 to work as a camp counselor and consultant for the Girl Scouts of the USA (GSUSA).

From 1930 to 1931 she taught sports, accompanied school singing and lead the folk dance club and walking club at the Mary C. Wheeler School. She co-authored the first of 34 books, One Act Trips Abroad, with Alice M G White, a Scottish woman who she met at the school. They would go on to write four books together.

In 1933, she taught the class A Survey of Folk Songs at The New School for Social Research in New York.

=== Shepherd's pipes ===
Tobitt introduced the shepherd's pipes to the Girl Scouts. She was also the first person to play them on American radio, as part of a program dedicated to international music that was broadcast nationally from the newly opened Rockefeller Center in November 1933. She also directed a group of Girl Scout leaders playing the shepherd's pipes as part of a birthday celebration for the Girl Scout movement on Alma Kitchell's Let’s Talk It Over radio program in 1939. In the same year, she co-authored Making and Playing Shepherd’s Pipes with Barbara Embury for the Girl Scout Equipment Service. Of the pipes she said "You should always carry your pipe with you. If you do, it becomes your comrade. So soothing and satisfying. So soft. So easy on the listener. It is too quiet to bother others, yet in the country the flute-like music carries a good half mile."

=== Girl Scouts and Girl Guides ===
In 1934 Tobitt was the music supervisor for singing and folk dancing at the Girl Scout National Training Camp Edith Macy in Pleasantville, NY and the Pine Tree Camp in Massachusetts. She was on the council of the Folk Festival in New York, and in a letter to the Spirituals Society from January 1936, she is referenced as being "from the Program Division, Girl Scouts, NYC". In autumn 1936 she returned to the UK for 18 months, in part to be in the country for the coronation of King George VI. Of her trip, it was reported, "Toby writes that she is being kept as busy as a cranberry merchant by the Girl Guides - sleeps in a different bed every night and is working on a new collection of songs for Guides, because importation problems make the use of Singing Together in England impractical." "Toby" was Tobitt's nickname in Girl Scouting circles. During this period, Tobitt was the British Girl Guides Association's trainer in campfire singing, travelling around England and Scotland giving workshops to Girl Guides and their leaders. In this role, she led the campfire singing after a Coronation Service at Beverley Minster. She also took a year's sabbatical to carry out a survey of music and music-based recreational activities in 200 towns and hamlets across the UK. She returned to New York in May 1938. The passenger list indicates her profession as ‘writer’ and notes that her country of intended future permanent residence was the U.S.A.

== USA: 1940 onwards ==
Tobitt became a naturalized American on 29 May 1940.

She held several more roles within the Girl Scouting organization, including National Music and Folk Dancing Consultant where she was credited with creating "a strong musical culture for the organization" and music director, where she was considered "principally responsible" for the "national movement towards keener appreciation of music by Girl Scouts." On her recommendation, girls and leaders were encouraged to sing, and to offer constructive criticism of others’ singing at both national camps and within troops. There were singing competitions where the girls acted as the judges and selected the elements of performance (such as tone quality, accuracy, light and shade of expression) on which to base their judgment.

In 1941, Tobitt and Alice M. G. White taught intensive folk-dance and dramatics courses at Purdue University, Indiana. She also taught at Columbia University, New York.

In the same year, when commenting on the value of teaching music, Tobitt said, "the morale of Girl Scouting helps in the shelters in England and France in teaching the people songs while waiting for the all-clear signals." Whilst leading a singing session at the Lansing Institute, she "told of the conduct of recreational activity and its importance under war conditions in London."

She was the music director of the Girl Scout Council of Greater New York and in 1945 recorded five songs (Girl Scouts Together, Merry Lark, O Beautiful Banner, Our Chalet Song, Swiftly Flowing Labe) with "the Manhattan choral group... to be used as theme music for local broadcasts" by the GS National Organization. She was also the director of Girl Scouting in Tarrytown, NY.

From 1947 to 1948, she traveled through more than 100 American communities, including high schools, universities and churches, leading song and dance sessions for 16,000 men, women and children in total. Of the tour, she wrote, "it proved to be not a mangling experience, but a rejuvenating one".

During her Scouting career she travelled to 40 US states, leading workshops with groups of up to 1,000 people at a time. She visited many states several times and was called an "itinerant Scout executive".

Her final positions within GSUSA were Assistant to the Director of the Program Department from 1954 to 1955 and Special Camp Consultant in the Camping Division from 1956 to 1958.

She resumed her freelance writing career in 1955, but continued to be a frequent contributor to the Girl Scout Leader magazine. Of her Girl Scouting experience she observed "I was struck by the extraordinary vitality of our Girl Scout program, its genius and its universal appeal, its adaptability to all kinds of circumstances and needs, and over its underlying seriousness of purpose the element of fun so attractive to the young in heart."

=== Teaching ===
Tobitt believed "any adult equipped with some basic recreational material, plus sound teaching principles, can go forth as a leader and have fun." She was an advocate for the teaching of rounds, stating that they "afford a painless, even joyful introduction to part singing". Her training sessions with youth leaders included instruction on presentation, leadership, the use of source material and the correlation of music with other activities.

=== Girl Scouts overseas ===
Tobitt was the first staff member of GSUSA to represent the organization overseas. From 1951 to 1952 she was based in Heidelberg, Germany as the Community Advisor for the North Atlantic Girl Scouts (NORAGS). In this role, she trained 650 women and organized activities for 3,000 girls from more than a hundred Girl Scout troops at 17 American bases throughout Germany and Austria. She also coordinated efforts to get basic supplies, such as clothing, sheets, blankets and yarn from the States to children in hospitals, schools and nurseries in Germany. As result of her efforts, the Army granted her the civilian equivalent of a Colonel's rank.

From 1953 to 1954, she was the Director of the Far East American Girl Scout Association in Japan. Of this organization she wrote, "These wives and daughters of our security forces' personnel, State Department officials, traders and clergymen have a unique opportunity as ambassadors of goodwill to effect understanding and to bring back to their homeland their broader knowledge of the world." The role also involved trying to get Japanese women into scouting. Of this, she said: "Our objective was to give understanding, not to change Japanese women."

In 1955, she traveled to Sri Lanka as Community Advisor for American Girl Scout Troops on Foreign Soil (TOFS) for a Round Table Training Conference, sponsored by WAGGGS.

=== Hiroshima Maidens ===
Tobitt supported the Moral Adoption program established by the journalist and peace advocate Norman Cousins in 1949, which enabled Americans to help raise children orphaned by the bombing of Hiroshima and Nagasaki through the provision of financial support, gifts and letters.

In 1953, she contacted Cousins, writing: "You probably know there is a great deal of 'anti-Americanism' propagated by the Communists, and a friend and I have been wondering what new act of goodwill might counteract it." They corresponded about the possibility that the Girl Scouts might play a part in looking after the Hiroshima Maidens, 25 school-age girls who were seriously disfigured as a result of the fission bomb dropped on Hiroshima, after they reached America for reconstructive surgery. Due to matters becoming 'delicate', the Girl Scouts were unable to get involved. However, Tobitt was to play a personal role in the mission to fly the young women to the US. After Cousins received multiple rejections for financial support for the venture, Tobitt suggested that he make an appeal to the editor of the Nippon Times, Mr. Kiyoshi Togasaki. Cousins acted on Tobitt's suggestion, and consequently General John E. Hull of the U.S. Far East Command agreed to provide air transportation for the women.

Once the women were in the US, Tobitt, together with C. Frank Ortloff of the Religious Society of Friends, was in charge of the "very substantial problem of out-of-hospital care" which involved the women staying in private homes in New York City, as they prepared for, or recuperated from multiple operations. She was also involved in raising awareness of these women through giving talks to interested groups.

=== Folk songs and dances ===
Tobitt was an "inveterate traveller", and travelled widely in the US, as well as in Korea, Japan, Sri Lanka, France, Italy, Belgium, Germany, Austria, Switzerland, Malta, the UK and Canada. She collected songs and dances as she went, many of which subsequently appeared in her numerous publications, some for the first time in an American publication. She encouraged Girl Scouts and their leaders to collect traditional songs, such as those "handed down by members of their families, or heard in out-of-the-way places". Several of her self-published songbooks included blank manuscript at the back as a place to jot notes.

Of folk songs, she said, "When we sing the songs of other people we share their heritage and possibly come to a deeper understanding of their lives and thoughts." In America, she collected sea shanties, including My Lover is a Sailor Boy, spirituals including Go Down Moses, and folksongs from the Catskills including Poor and Foreign Stranger.

Tobitt was still leading folk dance and singing workshops in July 1963 at the age of 65.

== Publications ==
Tobitt authored and edited at least 34 books over four decades. She self-published eight books, including the popular The Ditty Bag and Yours for a Song. Her books included translations from at least 15 languages: Italian, French, German, Dutch, Danish, Swedish, Greek, Portuguese, Lithuanian, Russian, Czech, Armenian, Spanish, Creole and Japanese.

- One Act Trips Abroad (1931) co-authored with Alice M. G. White
- Making and playing Shepherds Pipes, a pamphlet; With diagram, directions, and ten airs (1933)
- Sing Together (1936)
- Skip to my Lou: 17 Singing Games (1936)
- Dramatized Ballads with musical accompaniment (1937) co-authored with Alice M. G. White, contribution by Barbara Danielson
- Notes for Song Leaders (1937)
- The World Sings: Folk Songs and Rounds from Many Countries (1937)
- The Singing World: More Songs and Rounds from Many Countries
- Yours for a Song (1939)
- Plays for High Holidays (1939) co-authored with Alice M. G. White
- Whirling Maiden: A Collection of Singing Games (1939)
- Saucy Sailor and other Dramatized Ballads (1940) co-authored with Alice M. G. White, contribution by John Rawdon
- On Your Toes: a Compilation of Song-Dances (1941)
- Sing Me Your Song, O(1941)
- Singing Games for Recreation Books 1 – 4 (1942–1952)
- The Ditty Bag (1946)
- Promenade All (1947)
- Sing Together: A Girl Scout Songbook (1949)
- A Book of Negro Songs (1950)
- ABCs of Camp Music (1955)
- Program in Girl Scout Camping (1959)
- 15 Austrian Folk Songs: Yodels and Carols (1959)
- Folk Songs from the Far East (1959)
- The Red Book of Singing Games and Dances from the Americas (1960)
- The Yellow Book of Singing Games and Dances from around the World (1960)
- Our World in Song (1960)
- Canciones De Nuestra Cabana (1963)
- A Journey in Song: A Choice of Songs Everybody Sings (1965)
- A Counselor's Guide to Camp Singing (1971)

== See also ==
- YouTube channel 'Songs for Girl Guides and Girl Scouts'
- Leslie's Guiding History
- Alice White (author)
- Mary Cuningham Chater
