= Burcot, Worcestershire =

Village in Worcestershire, England

Coordinates: 52.342887°N 2.027986°W

Burcot
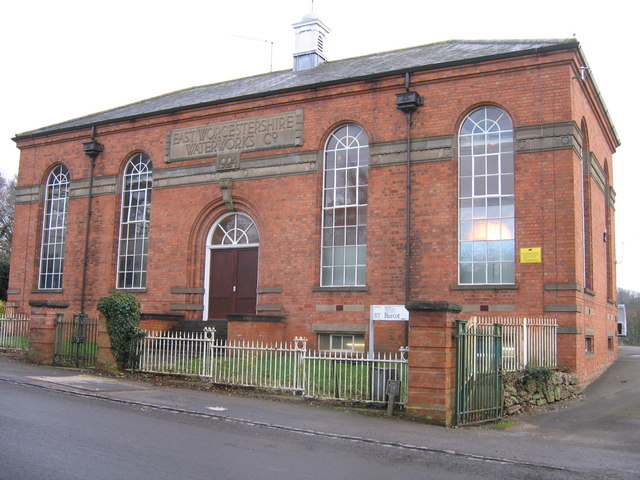
- East Worcestershire Waterworks Building

- Location within Worcestershire
- OS grid reference: SO981714
- Civil parish: Unparished
- District: Bromsgrove
- Shire county: Worcestershire
- Region: West Midlands
- Country: England
- Sovereign state: United Kingdom
- Post town: BROMSGROVE
- Postcode district: B60
- Dialling code: 01527
- Police: West Mercia
- Fire: Hereford and Worcester
- Ambulance: West Midlands
- UK Parliament: Bromsgrove

Burcot is a small village in the Bromsgrove district of Worcestershire, England.

Burcot has a village hall, which is available for hire. It has a Guild of Craftsmen.

The village was listed in the Domesday Book in 1086 when it was known as Bericote.
