= Agnes Pinnick =

British Girl Guide executive and social worker

- Agnes Pinnick receiving the Silver Fish Award, 1950
- Born: Agnes Elizabeth Hancock James; 1901; Wandsworth, London, UK
- Died: 7 August 1953 (aged 51–52); Alor Setar, Kedah, Malaysia
- Other name: Mrs A W Pinnick
- Education: University of London
- Spouse: Alfred William Pinnick (m. 1926)
- Children: 1

Agnes Pinnick (1901 – 7 August 1953) was a Girl Guide executive. She was chief commissioner for Malaya and Singapore Girl Guides in the 1940s and was credited with "reorganising the Girl Guide movement" in Malaysia after WWII. During WWII she was chair of the Western Australia Guide International Service (GIS) committee. In 1950 she received the Silver Fish Award, the Girl Guide Association's (GGA) highest adult honour, the first person from Singapore or Malaysia to receive the award.

== Personal life ==
Agnes was the only child of James James, a police constable, and wife Mary. Agnes graduated from the University of London with a degree in economics. She married Alfred William Pinnick (1900-1963) in Shanghai on 3 July 1926. They moved from Shanghai to Penang in 1934, where her husband was headmaster of a government commercial school. She gave birth to a son in November 1935. She spent a year living in Harpenden, UK in 1939. Her husband's job was transferred to Singapore in December 1940. During the Japanese occupation of Singapore he was held captive for three and a half years while Pinnick and her son lived in Perth, Australia, returning to Penang and her husband in 1946. Her health began to decline in 1950, and she died in Alor Setar, Malaysia in 1953.

== Girl Guides ==
Pinnick began her Guiding career in 1926 as captain of the 5th Shanghai Company, based at the Thomas Hanbury Girls' School. Other Guiding roles she held in Shanghai included Cub mistress, Guide captain, district captain and camp advisor. After moving to Penang in 1934 she became district commissioner for Penang and Province Wellesley.

While living in Perth during WWII, Pinnick was secretary and then chair of the Guide International Service (GIS) committee for Western Australia, she was its delegate at the Australian GIS conference in 1945. At a local level she was district commissioner for Claremont and Cottesloe district. After she returned to Penang she became state commissioner for Selangor. She was appointed chief commissioner for Malaya and Singapore in 1947.

She wrote many plays and ceremonies for the Guides, including for the Coronation and for Penang's 150th anniversary. In 1948, while in England, she attended an Empire Ranger Week event in Northampton where she gave a talk on "Empire Rangering".

In March 1950 she was awarded the Silver Fish, the Girl Guiding movement's highest adult honour. Three months later she flew to England to attend the Chief Commissioner's Conference at Foxlease, Hampshire and the 13th World Conference in Oxford, where she represented Malaysia. In 1952 she made two "extensive tours" of Malaysia, training and testing leaders throughout the country. She resigned as chief commissioner, as a result of health issues, in April 1953.

After her death, funds were raised to build the Agnes Pinnick Memorial Hut in Kuala Lumpur, Malaysia.

== Other ==
Pinnick worked with the Malaysian Education Department. She was also involved with the YWCA in Penang, under the auspices of which she organised a "business women's dinner" with 34 nationalities in attendance. She was active with the Inner Wheel and the Kuala Lumpur Victoria Institution Historical Association.

She produced, directed and appeared in plays for various organisations including the Penang Teachers' Association, the "Y" Little Theatre in Kuala Lumpur and the Theatre Club of Kuala Lumpur. In 1940 she gave a talk to the Georgetown Abbey Players titled "Dramatic Activities of my Childhood".

In 1951 she spoke out in favour of creating a Malaysian Housewives' League, to "fight [post-war] profiteers" having seen the archetype organisation in operation in England.
