= Tuoll on mun kultani =

Finnish folk-song

Tuoll on mun kultani (There is my sweetheart) is a Finnish folk song from the Kanteletar.
