= George Malcolm (Indian Army officer) =

Sir George Malcolm
- Born: 10 September 1818
- Died: August 1897 (aged 78)
- Spouse: Wilhelmina Charlotte Hughes
- Children: 3, inc Helen Malcolm
- Military career
- Allegiance: United Kingdom
- Branch: British Indian Army
- Rank: General
- Conflicts: First Anglo-Afghan War; Second Anglo-Sikh War; Anglo-Persian War
- Awards: Knight Grand Cross of the Order of the Bath

General Sir George Malcolm GCB (10 September 1818 – August 1897) was an officer in the Bombay Army and British East India Company.

== Early life ==
He was born at Bombay on 10 September 1818, was the only son of David Malcolm, a Bombay merchant, who was the brother of Admiral Sir Pulteney and General Sir John Malcolm. He was educated at Blundell's School in Tiverton, the University of Edinburgh and at Addiscombe Military Seminary.

== Military career ==
He was commissioned into the East India Company on 10 June 1836, and was posted to the 1st Bombay Native Infantry on 18 July 1837.

He served in the First Anglo-Afghan War, as deputy-assistant commissary-general and baggage-master with the Bombay division, and was present at the battle of Ghazni and occupation of Kabul.

In August 1840, at the head of a detachment of Sind Irregular Horse, he joined the force sent under Major Clibborn to relieve Kahan in Baluchistan, took part in the attempt to force the Nafusk pass, and was mentioned in despatches for his gallantry. He was also engaged in the operations against Nusseer Khan and the Brahoes, and the capture of their camp near Kanda on 1 December. He received the medal.

He became lieutenant on 31 August 1840. He served under Colonel John Jacob during the subjugation of Sind, and was present at the battle of Shadadpur and the capture of Shahpur. In the Second Anglo-Sikh War, he commanded the 2nd Sind horse, and was present at the siege of Multan and the battle of Gujrat. He was mentioned in despatches, received the medal, and on becoming captain in his regiment (1st Bombay native infantry) he was given a brevet majority on 22 June 1849. He became lieutenant-colonel on 28 November 1854.

He served in the Anglo-Persian War of 1856–7, and commanded a small field force during the Indian mutiny. On 29 November 1857, he stormed the fortified village of Halgalli. He took possession of Shorapur on 9 February 1858, and on 2 June he captured the fort of Nargund, the strongest in the South Maratha country. He was mentioned in despatches, received the medal, and was appointed CB on 21 March 1859. He became colonel in the army on 30 August 1860, and major-general on 15 December 1867. In the expedition to Abyssinia in 1868 he commanded the second division, which guarded the line of communications. He was included in the vote of thanks of parliament, was advanced to KCB on 14 August 1868, and received the medal. He was promoted lieutenant-general on 29 May 1875, and general on 1 October 1877, and was placed on the unemployed supernumerary list on 1 July 1881. He was advanced to GC on 29 May 1886.

He died at Leamington on 6 April 1897.

== Family ==
On 19 October 1852 he married Wilhelmina Charlotte, youngest daughter of the Rev. Henry Alright Hughes. She survived him. In 1868 he printed for private circulation at Karachi Remarks on the Indian Army (18 pages), in which he dwelled on the danger of relying on European troops and of neglecting and discrediting the native army, as had been the tendency since the mutiny.

== Honours and awards ==
Malcolm received the following awards:

- 1858 – CB
- 1868 – KCB
- 1886 – GCB

== Sources ==
- Obituary of General Sir George Malcolm, The Times, Wednesday, 7 April 1897 (pg. 12; Issue 35171; col D)
