= The Young Visiters =

1919 novel by Daisy Ashford

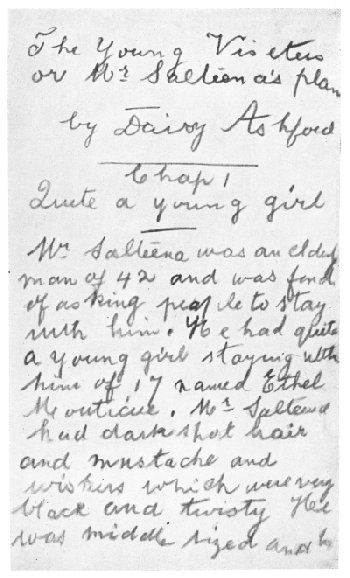
- First page of The Young Visiters manuscript
- Author: Daisy Ashford
- Language: English
- Publication date: 1919
- Publication place: United Kingdom
- ISBN: 0-89733-365-9

The Young Visiters or Mister Salteena's Plan is a 1919 novel by English writer Daisy Ashford (1881–1972). She wrote it in 1890 when she was nine years old and part of its appeal lies in its juvenile innocence, and its unconventional grammar and spelling. A great success, it sold around half a million copies during the twentieth century and has been adapted for film, television, and as both a stage play and a musical.

== Plot ==
Alfred Salteena, an "elderly man of 42", has invited 17-year-old Ethel Monticue to stay with him. They receive an invitation to visit Alfred's friend, Bernard Clark, which they readily accept. Bernard is "inclined to be rich". Shortly after their arrival, Ethel and Bernard become attracted to each other.

Alfred seeks Bernard's advice on how to become a gentleman. Bernard is doubtful that this can be managed, but writes an introduction to his friend the Earl of Clincham. Alfred excitedly rushes off to London to visit the Earl, leaving Ethel alone and unchaperoned with Bernard.

Lord Clincham lives, as many other aristocrats do, in "compartements" at the Crystal Palace. He agrees to assist Alfred and instals him in a subterranean "compartement", along with other "apprentice gentlemen". He invites Alfred to accompany him to a reception hosted by the Prince of Wales (the future King Edward VII), introducing Salteena as Lord Hyssops. The Prince is impressed, and promises to assist the trembling and overjoyed Salteena.

Bernard and Ethel fall in love and marry. Devastated by these events, Salteena marries a maid-in-waiting at Buckingham Palace. Lord Clincham also marries, but not very happily.

== Composition and publication ==
Ashford wrote the novel in an exercise book at the age of nine in 1890. Full of spelling mistakes, each chapter was written as a single paragraph. Many years later, in 1917 and aged 36, Ashford rediscovered her manuscript languishing in a drawer, and lent it to Margaret Mackenzie, a friend who was recovering from influenza. It passed through several other hands before it reached Frank Swinnerton, a novelist who was also a reader for the publishers Chatto and Windus. Largely due to Swinnerton's enthusiasm for this piece of juvenilia, the book was published almost exactly as it had been written. J. M. Barrie, the creator of Peter Pan, agreed to write a preface.

The original manuscript of The Young Visiters is held in the Berg Collection of the New York Public Library.

== Reception ==
The book was so successful that it had been reprinted 19 times by 1936. After its publication, rumours soon started that the book was in fact an elaborate literary hoax and that it had been written by J. M. Barrie himself. These rumours persisted for years.

== Adaptations ==
A stage play of The Young Visiters by Mrs George Norman and Margaret Mackenzie was first performed in London in 1920 and transferred shortly afterwards to New York. The New York production, at the Thirty-Ninth Street Theatre, received generally good reviews. One reviewer stated that

The Young Visiters ... has been turned into a play by the simple use of a pair of shears and a pot of paste. Probably no novel was ever so reverently dramatized since the world began.

A two-act musical comedy version, Quite a Young Girl by Alicen White, Martha D Coe and Peter Colonna, was written in 1960. Whilst it received the author’s blessing, they ultimately failed to find a producer. A musical by Michael Ashton and Ian Kellam based on the book was produced in 1968.

A feature-length film was made in 1984 starring Tracey Ullman and John Standing. A television film version was made by the BBC in 2003 starring Jim Broadbent as Alfred Salteena, Lyndsey Marshal as Ethel Monticue and Hugh Laurie as Lord Bernard Clark. The screenplay was written by Patrick Barlow and it was directed by David Yates.

== Citations ==
Evelyn Waugh mentions the book in his novel A Handful of Dust (1934) as part of the childhood reading of his hero Tony Last.

The critic Edmund Wilson referred to the novel This Side of Paradise (1920) by his friend F. Scott Fitzgerald as "a classic in a class with The Young Visiters ", meaning that Fitzgerald's book had a rather naive style.

Elizabeth MacKintosh writing as Josephine Tey mentions the book in her novel Miss Pym Disposes (1947) as a book "that makes everyone smile".

Margaret MacMillan in her history of the Paris Peace Conference Peacemakers: The Paris Peace Conference of 1919 and Its Attempt to End War mentions in passing (page 45) that "The Young Visiters", "a comic novel written by a child", was "the most popular book of 1919".
