= Daisy Ashford =

English writer

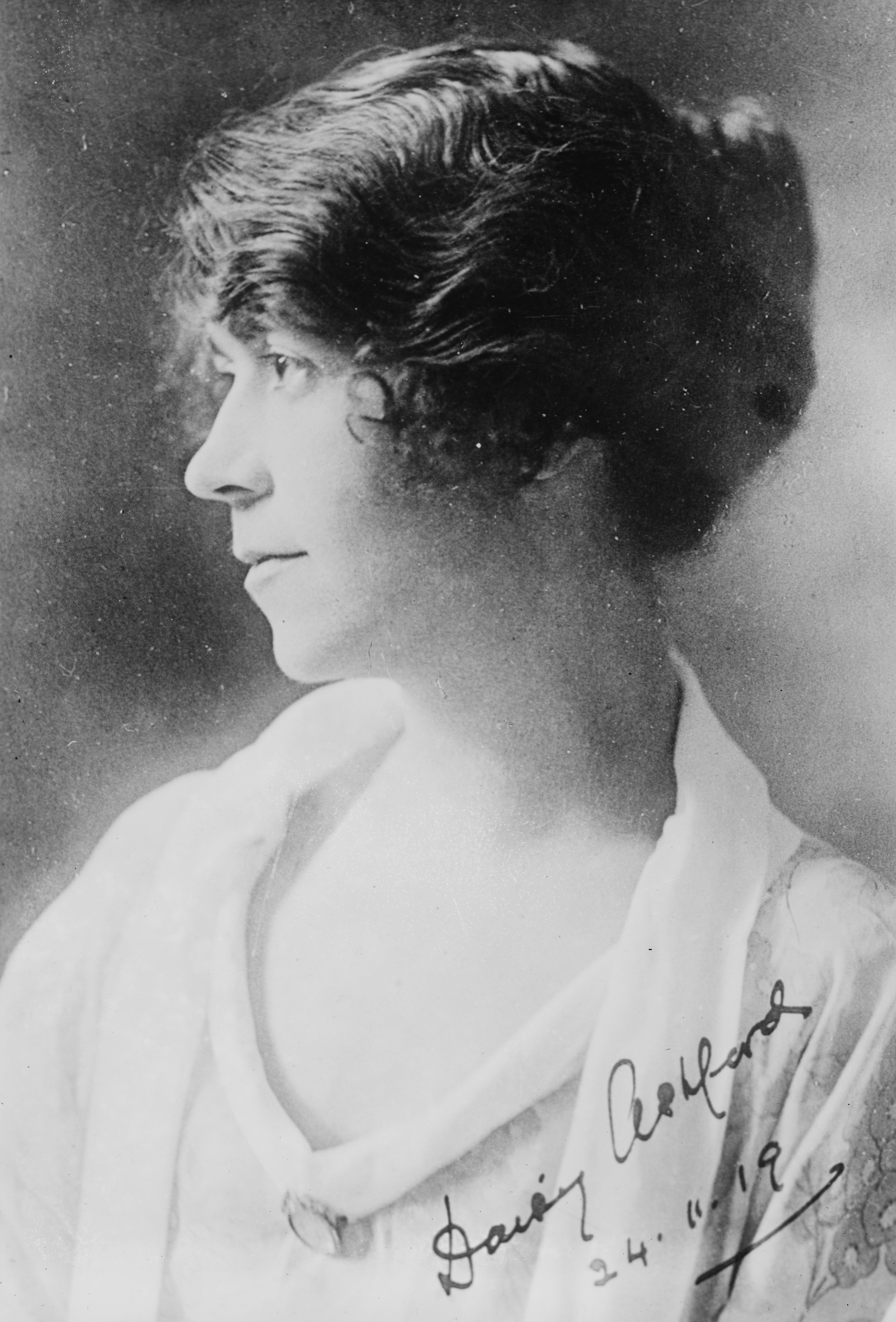
- Ashford in 1919
- Born: Margaret Mary Julia Ashford; 3 April 1881; Petersham, London, England
- Died: 15 January 1972 (aged 90); Norwich, England
- Occupation: Novelist
- Notable work: The Young Visiters
- Spouse: James Devlin (m. 1920; died 1956)
- Children: 4

Margaret Mary Julia Devlin (née Ashford; 3 April 1881 – 15 January 1972), known as Daisy Ashford, was an English writer who is most famous for writing The Young Visiters, a novella concerning the upper class society of late-19th-century England, when she was nine years old. The novella was published in 1919, preserving her juvenile spelling and punctuation. She wrote the title as "Viseters" in her manuscript, but it was published as "Visiters".

== Life ==
=== Early life and education ===
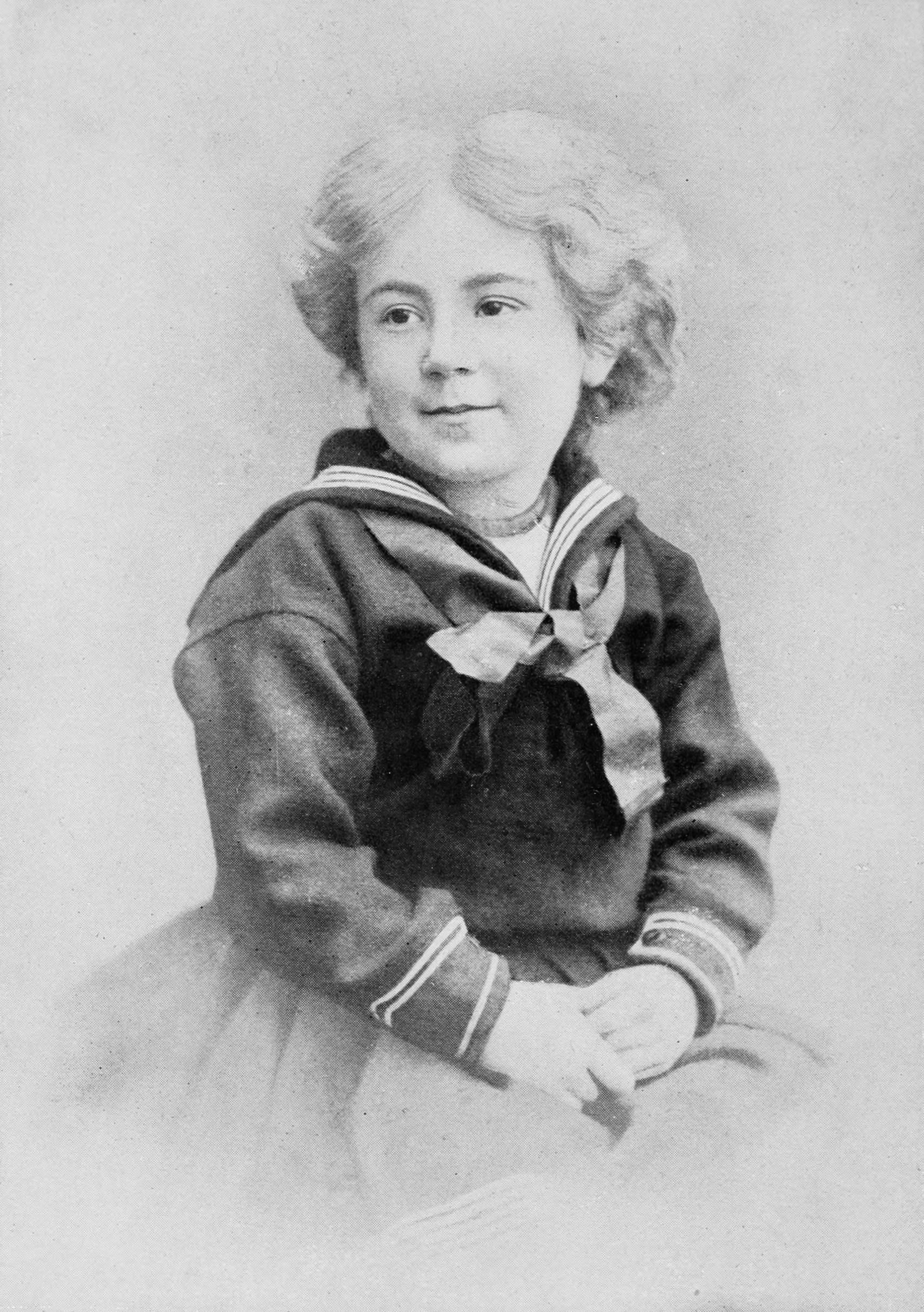
Daisy Ashford as a child

Daisy Ashford was born on 3 April 1881 in Petersham, Surrey, the eldest of three daughters born to Emma Georgina Walker and William Henry Roxburgh Ashford. She was largely educated at home with her sisters Maria Veronica 'Vera' (born 1882) and Angela Mary 'Angie' (born 1884).

Between the ages of seventeen and eighteen, Ashford attended the Roman Catholic boarding school of the Priory of Our Lady of Good Counsel at Haywards Heath.

=== Career ===
At the age of four Daisy dictated her first story, The Life of Father McSwiney, to her father; it was published in 1983. From 1889 to 1896 she and her family lived at 44 St Anne's Crescent, Lewes, where she wrote The Young Visiters. She wrote several other stories; a play, A Woman's Crime; and one other short novel, The Hangman's Daughter, which she considered to be her best work. Some stories written by Ashford are lost.

She stopped writing during her teens. In 1896 the family moved to the Wallands area of Lewes, and in 1904 she moved with her family to Bexhill, and then to London where she worked as a secretary. She ran a canteen in Dover during the First World War. When published in 1919, The Young Visiters was an immediate success, and several of her other stories were published in 1920. Ashford bought a farm on the proceeds of The Young Visiters and once observed, “I like fresh air — and royalties.” She did not write in later years, although in old age she did begin an autobiography which she later destroyed.

=== Personal life ===
In 1920, at the age of 38, Ashford married James Devlin, with whom she had four children. They ran a flower-growing business near Norwich and later the King's Arms Hotel in Reepham for a year. Devlin died in 1956.

=== Death ===
She died in Norwich on 15 January 1972 and was buried in the city's Earlham Road Cemetery.

== In popular culture ==
Mathew Klickstein and Rick Geary's graphic novel Daisy Goes to the Moon: A Daisy Ashford Adventure was published by Fantagraphics in January 2025.

== Published writings ==
- The Young Visiters, or, Mr Salteena's Plan. London: Chatto and Windus, 1919
- Daisy Ashford: Her Book: A Collection of the Remaining Novels. London: George H. Doran and Company, 1920
- Love and Marriage: Three Stories. London: Hart-Davis, 1965
- Where Love Lies Deepest. London: Hart-Davis, 1966
- The Hangman's Daughter and Other Stories. Oxford University Press 1983 (Includes The Life of Father McSwiney)

== See also ==
- Child prodigy
