= Margaret Pilkington (Girl Guides) =

English Girl Guide leader

Margaret Pilkington MBE JP
- Margaret Pilkington from a 1944 newspaper
- Born: 19 January 1906; St Helens, England
- Died: 15 January 1985 (aged 78); St Helens, England
- Education: University of Cambridge
- Occupation: Girl Guide leader
- Relatives: Charles Pilkington and Richard Pilkington (great-uncles)
- Family: Harry Pilkington (brother); Roger Pilkington (brother); Herbert Cozens-Hardy, 1st Baron Cozens-Hardy (grandfather); Margaret Pilkington (second cousin)

Margaret Pilkington (19 January 1906 – 15 January 1985) was a Girl Guide executive. She volunteered with the Guide International Service (GIS) in post-war Egypt and Greece. For her GIS service she was awarded an MBE in 1948 and the Silver Fish Award, Girl Guiding's highest adult honour, in 1955.

== Family and personal life ==
Margaret Hope Pilkington was the eldest daughter of Richard Austin Pilkington (1871–1951), chair of Pilkington Glass from 1921 – 1931, and Hope Cozens-Hardy (1877–1947), the daughter of Herbert Cozens-Hardy, 1st Baron Cozens-Hardy. Pilkington had four siblings, including Harry Pilkington and Roger Pilkington. Margaret Pilkington, the curator of Whitworth Art Gallery, was Pilkington's second cousin. Pilkington studied at Cambridge University. During World War II she volunteered on a mobile first aid post.

Pilkington died suddenly in January 1985. A service of remembrance was held at Scarisbrick Guide Camp, which Pilkington had been instrumental in setting up in the 1960s.

== Girl Guides ==
Pilkington, introduced to Guiding in the 1930s by her aunt, Christine Pilkington, held several roles within St Helens and district Girl Guiding, including camp advisor, assistant division commissioner, district commissioner for St Helens N.W. and captain of 1st St Helens Ranger company. In 1939, she led a group of Guides on a trip to Pax Ting, the Girl Guide World Camp in Gödöllő, Hungary. She held two Girl Guide Association (GGA) training diplomas.

== Guide International Service (GIS) ==
In 1943 Pilkington joined the Guide International Service (GIS) and undertook 18 months of "special training, fitting [her] for difficult work in countries which have been in Nazi occupation." It included a "toughening course" which involved "sleeping in barns, existing without money or kit, [and] being sent to lonely points on the Yorkshire moors in the snow to survive on iron rations."

In June 1944, she led the first GIS team of British adult Girl Guide volunteers. The team included Marjorie Stopford, Alison Duke, Marjory Jarman, Muriel Lees, Georgina Hall, Beryle Gibson, Maud Travers and Rosamund Wansburgh.

Their first posting was to Egypt, caring for Greek civilians in a refugee camp. They then moved to Greece where they organised centres to receive and process large numbers of hostages who had recently been released by their captors, The Greek People's Liberation Army. When the team arrived in Greece in February 1945, "Greek Guides, recognising the trefoil (the international symbol of Girl Guides) greeted them enthusiastically and with great relief at their coming." At a speech in Cambridge in 1950 the Chief Guide, Olave Baden-Powell said "You might be well proud of what those two [the second person being Marjory Jarman] did in the G.I.S. team helping the Greek Guides get started again."

In May 1945, Pilkington and her team were asked to turn a disused orphanage near Athens into a centre for displaced people. It had no water, lights, fuel, sanitation or furniture. On the same day "250 Greek soldiers, thirty-six women (six of them pregnant) and ten babies arrived" at the centre, seeking shelter, food and medical aid. The British Army had provided the centre with two days' worth of rations, and Pilkington's team had "one tin-opener, one knife and one first-aid kit" between them. By December there were 600 displaced people living at the centre. Pilkington and her team ran the centre for a year, until the following May.

Pilkington was awarded an MBE in 1948, "for services in Greece under the Guide International Service".

== Guiding post-GIS ==
Pilkington was selected to represent Great Britain at the 14th World Conference of the WAGGGS, held in Dombass, Norway in 1952, and the 15th World Conference, held in Utrecht, Netherlands in 1954. In 1964, upon hearing that 26 acres of land belonging to West Lancashire's Scarisbrick Hall was for sale, Pilkington "never stopped working" in her efforts to have the land bought by the Guides. £10,000 was raised and Pilkington "almost lived on site to ensure that everything went according to plan." The South West Lancashire Girl Guide County Camp Site was the result, officially opened in May 1967. It remains open in 2024.

=== Roles ===
Pilkington held the following roles within GGA:

- 1949 – assistant imperial commissioner for training
- 1950 – imperial commissioner, training Guiders "in the colonies" – she travelled extensively in this role, including to West Africa
- 1953 – South West Lancashire, assistant county commissioner
- 1955 – Commonwealth headquarters, advisor for training
- 1958 – Council of the Girl Guides Association, member
- 1964 – St Helens Guides, chief commissioner
- 1967 – St Helens, county camp advisor
- 1974 to 1980 – Merseyside County, president

== Other ==
Pilkington served as a magistrate in St Helens. In 1970, she and Dame Ethel Wormald were the first women to serve as Deputy Lieutenants of Lancashire.

She was president of her local Save the Children Fund and was "actively involved" in the Deaf Society. She was a practicing Christian and served as Deacon and Elder of her church, president of the Women's Guild and assisted in raising "substantial sums of money" for missionary work. In the 1950s Pilkington worked for local girls' clubs in St Helens.

== See also ==
- Hampton, Janie How the Girl Guides won the War (2011) Pub. ISIS ISBN 9780753152812
