= Roger Pilkington (writer) =

British biologist and author (1915–2003)

Dr. Roger Windle Pilkington
- Born: 17 January 1915; Lancashire, U.K.
- Died: 5 May 2003 (aged 88); Montouliers, France
- Education: Magdalene College, Cambridge
- Spouse(s): Theodora Miriam Hewat-Jaboor (1937-1974); Ingrid Geijer (1975-2004)
- Children: Cynthia Miriam Rumboll MBE; Hugh Austin Windle Pilkington
- Relatives: Margaret Pilkington (sister); Harry Pilkington (brother); Herbert Cozens-Hardy, 1st Baron Cozens-Hardy (grandfather); Margaret Pilkington (second cousin) Charles Pilkington and Richard Pilkington (great-uncles)

Roger Windle Pilkington (7 January 1915 – 5 May 2003) was a British writer and biologist. He is best known for his 20-volume Small Boat series, recounting trips along Europe's inland waterways in an Admiral's Barge, which he had converted into a sea going cabin cruiser, named "Commodore". In 1992 he wrote about his crossing the Atlantic in the airship Hindenburg.

== Early life and education ==
Pilkington was the third son of Richard Austin Pilkington (1871–1951), JP, of Eccleston Grange, St Helens, a director of the family glass-manufacturing business, Pilkington Brothers Ltd, and Hope née Cozens-Hardy (1876–1947), daughter of the politician and judge Herbert Cozens-Hardy, 1st Baron Cozens-Hardy. Pilkington's elder brother was the glass manufacturer and life peer Harry Pilkington. His sister Margaret Pilkington MBE was a committed Girl Guider leader. She led the first team of volunteers to work with displaced people in post-war Europe by the Guide International Service.

The Pilkingtons were Congregationalist. Pilkington was educated at Rugby School and Magdalene College, Cambridge (BA 1937, MA 1941, PhD in genetics 1947).

== Career ==
Pilkington produced 19 volumes in the Small Boat series, the first of his sailing books being Thames Waters, published in 1956, "an account of traveling the Thames in his cabin cruiser, a former admiral's barge called the Commodore"; his other works in this field included How Boats Are Navigated (1962), One Foot in France (1992), History and Legends of the European Waterways (1998). He also wrote about genetics and the relationship between sex and religion, these books including Males and Females (1948), Biology, Man and God (1951); How Your Life Began (1953); Revelation Through Science (1956); and World Without End (1960). He was also "author of a 1966 report by the British Council of Churches, Sex and Morality, criticized by some as overly tolerant of extramarital and premarital relations."

== Personal life ==
In 1937, Pilkington married firstly Theodora Miriam Hewat-Jaboor, daughter of Dr Farris Nasser Jaboor, of The Red Gables, Wooler, Northumberland; they had two children, Cynthia Miriam (1939–2026) and Hugh Austin Windle Pilkington (1942–1986). After their divorce, he married secondly, in 1973, Ingrid Maria, daughter of Herman Gustaf Geijer, of Brattfors, Sweden. She predeceased him by a year. Pilkington died in France, near Montouliers, he having spent many years of happy retirement between there and Jersey.

== Bibliography ==
=== Small Boat series ===
- Thames Waters (1956)
- Small Boat Through Belgium (1957)
- Small Boat Through Holland (1958)
- Small Boat to the Skagerrak (1960)
- Small Boat Through Sweden (1961)
- Small Boat to Alsace (1961)
- Small Boat to Bavaria (1962)
- Small Boat Through Germany (1963)
- Small Boat Through France (1964)
- Small Boat in Southern France (1965)
- Small Boat on the Thames (1966)
- Small Boat on the Meuse (1967)
- Small Boat to Luxembourg (1967)
- Small Boat on the Moselle (1968)
- Small Boat to Elsinore (1969)
- Small Boat to Northern Germany (1969)
- Small Boat on the Lower Rhine (1970)
- Small Boat on the Upper Rhine (1971)
- Small Boat down the Years (1987)
- Small Boat in the Midi (1989)

=== Other works ===
- Males and Females (1948)
- Stringer's Folly (1951)
- Biology, Man and God (1951)
- How Your Life Began (1953)
- Revelation Through Science (1956)
- World Without End (1960)
- How Boats Are Navigated (1962)
- Sex and Morality (1966)
- Waterways in Europe (1971)
- The Ormering Tide (1974)
- One Foot in France (1992)
- View From the Shore (1995)
- History and Legends of the European Waterways (1998)
