= Beryl Cozens-Hardy =

English Girl Guide leader

Beryl Cozens-Hardy OBE
- Beryl Cozens-Hardy
- Born: 30 November 1911; Liverpool, England
- Died: 25 September 2011 (aged 99); Letheringsett Hall, Norfolk, England
- Citizenship: British
- Occupation: Girl Guide leader
- Parent(s): Edward Cozens-Hardy, 3rd Baron Cozens-Hardy; Gladys Lily Cozens-Hardy, née Cozens-Hardy

The Hon. Beryl Cozens-Hardy OBE, JP (30 November 1911 – 25 September 2011) was the first British woman to hold the position of chair of the World Association of Girl Guides and Girl Scouts (WAGGGS).

== Personal life ==
Beryl Gladys Cozens-Hardy was the elder daughter of Edward Herbert Cozens-Hardy (later the 3rd Baron Cozens-Hardy) and Gladys Cozens-Hardy. She was educated at St James's School, Malvern, England, whose headmistress was a friend of Lord and Lady Baden-Powell, founders of the Girl Guides movement. The family lived at Sefton Park, Liverpool. She moved to Letheringsett Hall in Holt, Norfolk, in the late 1940s, and then to nearby The Glebe in 1965. In 2003 she returned to Letheringsett Hall, where she remained until her death.

She was a keen yachtswoman and would frequently sail on the Norfolk Broads, competing in regattas and races. In 1975, at the age of 64, she canoed up the Amazon River with her friend, Pam Gurney.

She was a trustee of the Lord Cozens-Hardy Trust. The Hon. Beryl Cozens-Hardy Charitable Trust was established in 2008 supporting the work of WAGGGS and other local causes.

She died at age 99 at Letheringsett Hall. She was buried in Letheringsett churchyard.

== Work ==
Before World War II, she worked for the BBC. When the war began she joined the Foreign Office Post and Telecommunications department, then transferred to the Imperial Censorship Service headquarters in Liverpool. Censorship departments were established all over the Commonwealth during the war, and she was invited to move to Bermuda, which functioned as “Britain’s listening post in the Atlantic.” She arrived in Bermuda in August 1940, to become personal assistant to the censorship controller. Her role – part of Britain’s counter-espionage operations – was to intercept mail from the US bound for Germany. She returned to the UK in 1944. After the war she worked for the United Kingdom Foreign Office, assisting in the restoration of British postal services around the world.

She served as a justice of the peace from 1955, representing Letheringsett on the former Erphingham Rural District Council. She was also a member of the Juvenile Panel. She was a district councilor and joined the Norfolk County Council education committee in 1962.

She assisted David Cannadine in the writing of his book Aspects of Aristocracy: Grandeur and Decline in Modern Britain (1994).

Cozens-Hardy was both great-great-great granddaughter and great-great-great-great granddaughter of the diarist Mary Hardy; she was descended from her along both parent's lines. She assisted Margaret Bird in the research of her four-volume work Mary Hardy and Her World (2020), writing the preface to each volume.

== Guiding career ==
Cozens-Hardy’s Guiding career spanned 85 years. She joined Girl Guides aged 14, which she believed “determined the course of her life, not just as a Guide leader, but as an adventurer, public servant, gardener and friend.”

She was a district commissioner in Liverpool as well as a Ranger Captain.

She held several Guiding positions in Norfolk: Guide Captain, Ranger Captain, Ranger advisor, district commissioner, County camp and International advisor, trainer and Norfolk County xommissioner from 1958-1960. She was president of the Anglia region in 1971.

As camp trainer she toured the West Indies for nine months to promote Guiding in 1954.

She was a member of the Girl Guides Commonwealth Headquarters Council and Executive Committee from 1955 to 1967 and was the Guides’ Chief Commissioner for England from 1961-1970. She was a member of the World Committee of the Association of Girl Guides and Girl Scouts (WAGGGS) from 1966 and chair of the advisory panel for promotion. In 1972 she was elected chair of the organisation, the first British woman to hold the position since WAGGGS’ inception in 1928. She held the position until 1975, and subsequently was appointed vice-president of Girl Guides for life.

Thereafter she was very active in raising funds for a Guiding centre in London. In 1982, WAGGGS’ new home, the Olave Centre was opened. She was a founding member of the Olave Baden-Powell Society in 1984.

== Awards ==
- Silver Elephant of the Bharat Scouts and Guides of India
- 1963 – Silver Fish Award, Girl Guides’ highest adult honour
- 1971 – OBE for her service to the Girl Guides Association
- 1997 – WAGGGS Bronze Medal

== Gardener ==
She was a keen gardener. She opened her gardens to the public at both Letheringsett Hall and The Glebe as part of the National Garden Scheme, raising thousands of pounds for charity. In 1999 she was presented with one of the organisation’s highest awards, a silver trowel and fork, in recognition of over 40 years of participation.
