= Letheringsett with Glandford =

Civil parish in Norfolk, England

Coordinates: 52.907°N 1.064°E

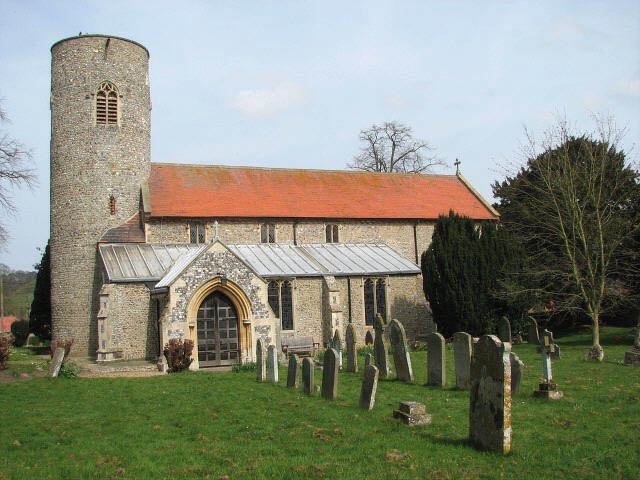
- St Andrew's Church, Letheringsett

- Village of Letheringsett about 1910

- Location within Norfolk
- Area: 8.19 km^{2} (3.16 sq mi)
- Population: 232 (2011 census)
  - Density: 28/km^{2} (73/sq mi)
  - London: 126 mi (203 km)
- Civil parish: Letheringsett with Glandford
- District: North Norfolk
- Shire county: Norfolk
- Region: East
- Country: England
- Sovereign state: United Kingdom
- Post town: HOLT
- Postcode district: NR25
- Dialling code: 01263
- Police: Norfolk
- Fire: Norfolk
- Ambulance: East of England
- UK Parliament: North Norfolk

Letheringsett with Glandford is a civil parish in the English county of Norfolk. It includes the village of Letheringsett, the hamlet of Glandford, and the former parish of Bayfield. The village straddles the A148 King's Lynn to Cromer road. Letheringsett is 1.2 miles west of Holt, 32.2 west north east of King's Lynn and 126 miles north north east of London. The nearest railway station is at Sheringham for the Bittern Line which runs between Sheringham, Cromer and Norwich. The nearest airport is Norwich International Airport.

== Description ==
The village of Letheringsett is situated in the valley of the River Glaven and has two watermills, Letheringsett Brewery watermill which stands on the west side of the river next to the A148 road bridge and is now disused, and Letheringsett Watermill which lies 150 yards to the south. It has won several prestigious awards for its flour production and is a tourist attraction. Next to the Brewery watermill is the village pub, the King's Head, which was built in the Georgian period.

Letheringsett Hall is a care home. It is a Grade II* listed building. Bayfield Hall dates from the 18th century and was built on the site of an earlier house. A deserted medieval village site at Bayfield was once a parish in its own right.

== St Andrew's Church ==
The Church of England parish church of Letheringsett, St Andrew's, is one of 124 existing round-tower churches in Norfolk.

The church appeared on a Great Britain commemorative stamp, issued on 21 June 1972 as part of a set on British Architecture (Village Churches).

== Notable people ==
- Jane Leade (1624–1704), a Christian mystic, was born at Letheringsett.
- John Burrell (1762–1825), entomologist and Rector of Letheringsett from 1786 to 1825.
- Caroline Colman (1831–1895), brought social reform to Colman's, born at Letheringsett Hall
- Herbert Hardy Cozens-Hardy, 1st Baron Cozens-Hardy (1838–1920), Liberal politician and judge.
- Mary Hardy (1733–1809), diarist.
