= Alison Duke =

Alison Duke may refer to:

- Alison Duke (classicist)
- Alison Duke (filmmaker)
