= Harry Pilkington =

British businessman (1905–1983)

The Right Honourable The Lord Pilkington
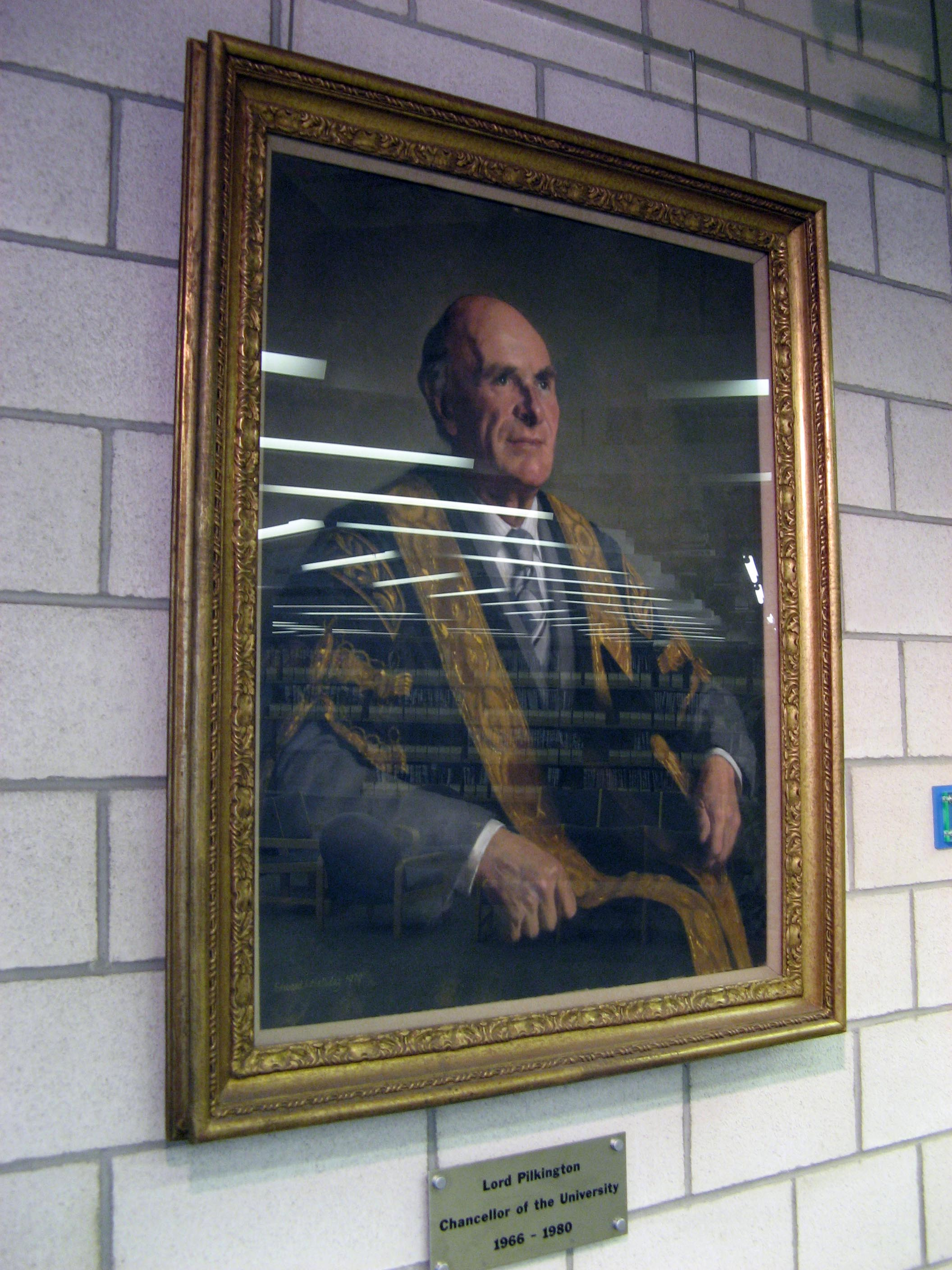
- Born: William Henry Pilkington; 29 April 1905; St Helens, Lancashire, England
- Died: 23 December 1983 (aged 78); St Helens, Lancashire, England
- Years active: 1934–1973
- Spouses: Rosamond Margaret Rowan (m. 1930; died 1953) Mrs Mavis Joy Doreen Wilding (m. 1961)
- Children: 3
- Relatives: Charles Pilkington and Richard Pilkington (great-uncles)
- Family: Margaret Pilkington (sister); Roger Pilkington (brother); Herbert Cozens-Hardy, 1st Baron Cozens-Hardy (grandfather); Margaret Pilkington (second cousin)
- Honours: Knighted 1953; Life Peer 1968

William Henry Pilkington, Baron Pilkington (29 April 1905 – 23 December 1983) was an English glass manufacturer and president of the Federation of British Industries. He is remembered politically as chairman of the Pilkington Committee that produced the controversial Pilkington Report of 1962. He was also Chancellor of Loughborough University from 1966 to 1980.

== Early life and education ==
Pilkington was born in St Helens, Lancashire, the eldest son of Richard Austin Pilkington (1871-1951), JP, of Eccleston Grange, St Helens, a director of the family glass-manufacturing business, Pilkington Brothers Ltd, and his wife, Hope (1876-1947), daughter of the politician and judge Herbert Cozens-Hardy, 1st Baron Cozens-Hardy.

His younger brother, Lawrence, would join him as a director of the family business; the third brother was the biologist and writer Roger Pilkington. His sister Margaret was a Girl Guide leader, awarded an MBE and a Silver Fish Award for her work with the Guide International Service.

The Pilkington family was Congregationalist. He was educated at Rugby School and Magdalene College, Cambridge.

== Pilkington Brothers Ltd ==
Pilkington joined the board of the family business, Pilkington Brothers Ltd, in 1934 and served as chairman from 1949 to 1973. This glass manufacturing company became the lone survivor of twenty-four British glass manufacturers from the 19th century. While other companies died from competition, the Pilkington company advanced its techniques, especially in safety glass and glass sheets, using the company's proprietary float glass process. In 1967 the company controlled 85% of the glass-making business in the United Kingdom and exported its products to over 100 countries.

== Pilkington Report ==
The Pilkington Report concluded that the British public were not being well-served by commercial television due to what it regarded as its American-influenced programming (such as westerns). It further concluded that although the British public had not been explicitly asked whether they wanted commercial radio, there was no evidence to support the contention that they wanted it. The unintended result of this conclusion was the creation of offshore commercial pirate radio in 1964. It also commended the BBC for the high quality of its television programming and recommended that the franchise for the-then third television channel should be granted to the BBC (which opened as BBC 2 in 1964), rather than to a commercial operator.

== Personal life ==
In 1930, Pilkington married Rosamond Margaret, daughter of Royal Army Medical Corps Colonel Henry Davis Rowan of Rathmore, Greystones, County Wicklow, Ireland. Rosamond died in 1953, having had with her husband a son and two daughters. He subsequently married Mavis Joy Doreen, daughter of master reed-maker Gilbert Caffrey of Woodleigh, Lostock Park, Bolton, and former wife of Dr John Hesketh Wilding.

Pilkington was known for his 'warm-hearted personality'; when a young couple moved in nearby, they decided to grow roses but lacked the experience in pruning. The wife was acquainted with Pilkington's gardener at Windle Hall, and made a phone call; the then-Lady Pilkington answered, telling her 'I'll pass the message on, but Harry prunes all ours'- within the hour, Pilkington arrived at the couple's house by bicycle, equipped with pruning shears.

Even as a Governor of the Bank of England, Pilkington cycled around London, 'to the delight and consternation of those who knew him.'

== Arms ==
Coat of arms of Harry Pilkington
Crest Upon a mount and between two tufts of grass Vert a mower habited per pale Argent and Gules holding up a scythe Proper. Escutcheon Argent a cross flory Gules voided of the field between five roses in saltire of the second barbed and seeded Proper. Motto Now Thus Now Thus.

== Honours ==
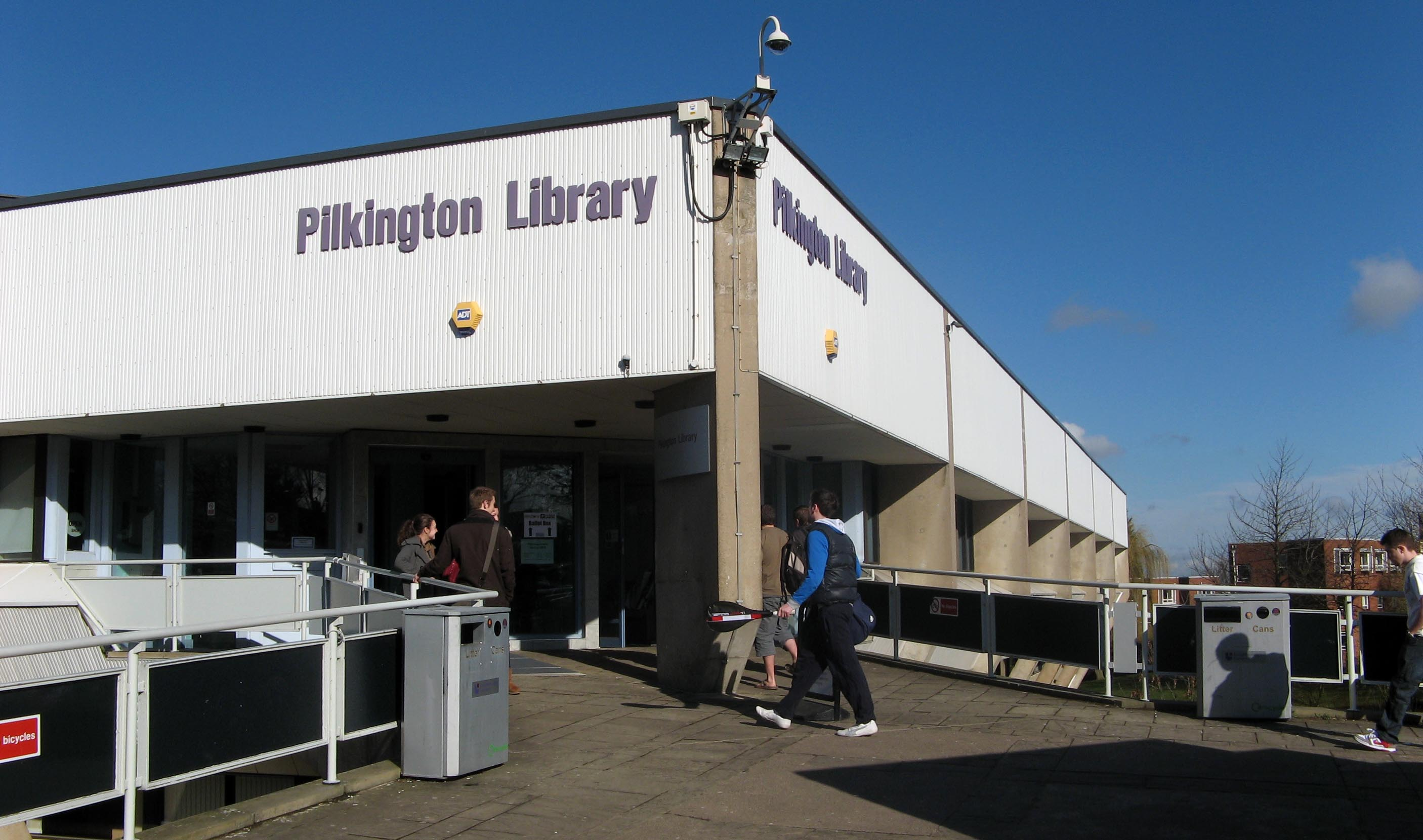
Named in his honour, the Pilkington Library at Loughborough University

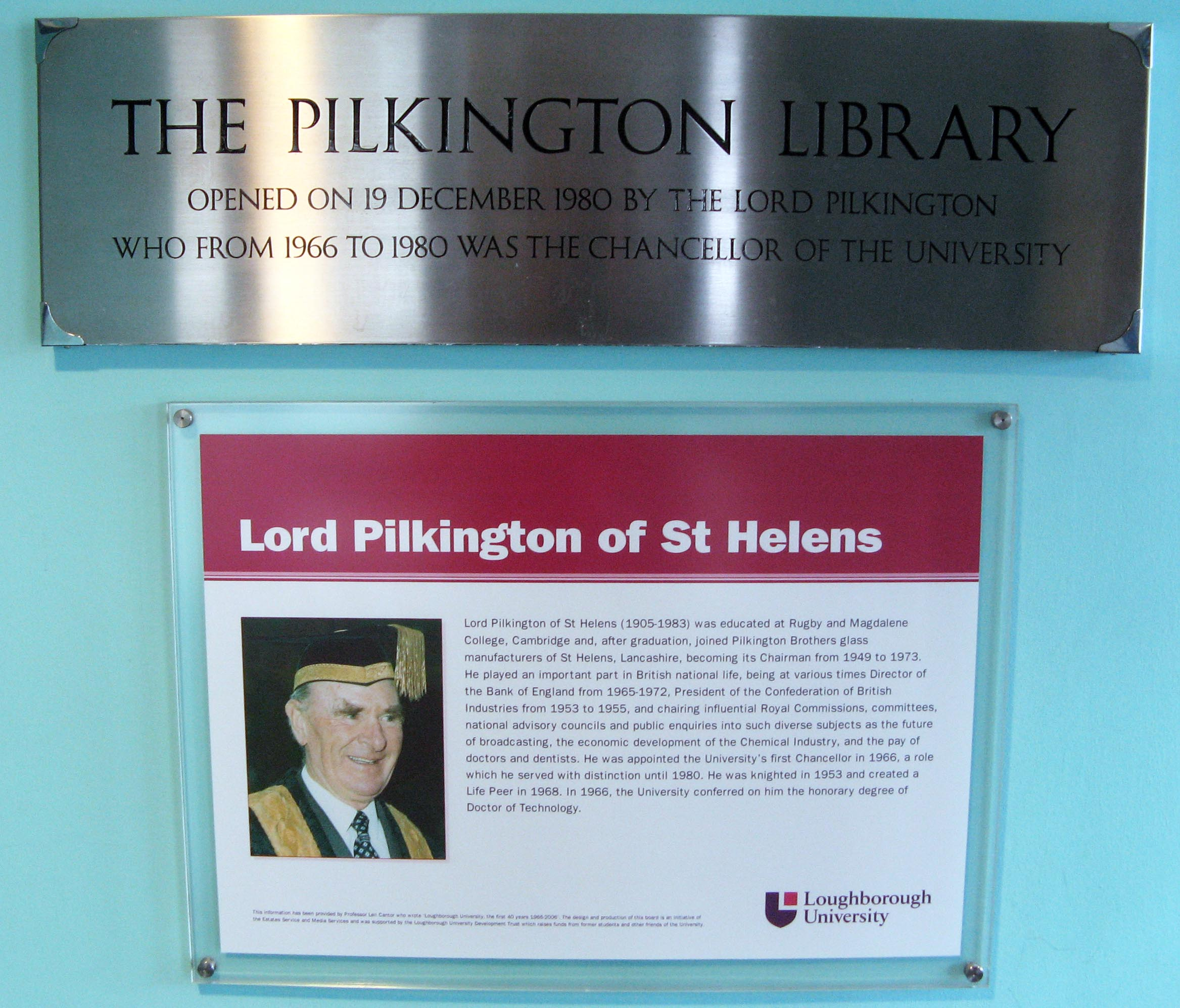
Plaque at the Pilkington Library, Loughborough University

Knighted in the 1953 New Years Honours List, Pilkington was created a Life Peer on 18 January 1968 in the 1968 New Years Honours List, taking the title Baron Pilkington, of St Helens in the County Palatine of Lancaster. He was awarded the honorary degree of Doctor of Science (D.Sc) by Loughborough University in 1966.

Academic offices
Preceded by Sir Herbert Manzoni as Chair of Governors of Loughborough College of Technology	Chancellor of Loughborough University; 1966–1980	Succeeded by Sir Arnold Hall
