= Edward Ullendorff =

British scholar and historian

Edward Ullendorff FBA
- Born: 25 January 1920; Berlin, Germany
- Died: 6 March 2011 (aged 91); Oxford, England
- Spouse: Dina Ullendorff (m. 1943)

Academic background
- Education: Hebrew University; University of Oxford
- Thesis: The Relationship of the Modern Semitic Ethiopian Languages to Ethiopic (Geʽez) (1952)
- Doctoral advisor: G. R. Driver

Academic work
- Discipline: Semitic studies; Ethiopian studies
- Institutions: University of St Andrews; University of Manchester; School of Oriental and African Studies, London
- Notable students: Hugh Pilkington; David Appleyard
- Notable works: The Ethiopians: An Introduction to Country and People (1966); Ethiopia and the Bible (1968)

Edward Ullendorff FBA (25 January 1920 – 6 March 2011) was a British scholar of Semitic languages and Ethiopian studies.

== Biography ==
Ullendorff was born on 25 January 1920 in Berlin, Germany, to an upper-class, secular Jewish family. His parents had planned to travel to Zurich for his birth so that he could obtain Swiss citizenship, but he was born earlier than planned. His father was a wholesale merchant who died shortly before Edward's 15th birthday. He was educated at the Graues Kloster in Berlin, a prestigious grammar school with focus on classical languages where Ullendorff excelled in Latin and Greek.

Fascinated by Jewish liturgy, he taught himself Hebrew, served as a cantor in Berlin's New Synagogue and became an expert in the cantillation of the Hebrew Bible. While still a high school student, he received the special permission of Ismar Elbogen to attend lectures on Hebrew, Bible and Talmud studies at the Berlin Hochschule für die Wissenschaft des Judentums. After his Abitur graduation, Ullendorff fled from the increasing persecution of Jews in Nazi Germany to Palestine in September 1938 (two months before the Kristallnacht pogroms) with the help of the Youth Aliyah organisation, leaving his family behind.

In Jerusalem, he attended the Hebrew University, studying in particular with the semitologist Hans Jakob Polotsky whom Ullendorff regarded as his academic master. He completed a Master of Arts degree in Semitic philology in 1941 as the university's first graduate in this subject. Thanks to his knowledge of Semitic languages, he joined the British Military Administration in Eritrea, examining documents in Amharic and Tigrinya for the British Censorship. While in Asmara, he married Dina Noack in 1943, whom he had known since his student days in Jerusalem and whose family also came from Berlin. From 1945 to 1946, Ullendorff served as assistant political secretary of the British military administration in Eritrea. In this capacity, he initiated the Eritrean Weekly News, the first Tigrinya-language newspaper, recruiting the future Eritrean independence fighter Woldeab Woldemariam as an editor.

After the end of the Second World War, Ullendorff returned to Jerusalem, where he worked as the Hebrew University's registrar and then for the British mandate administration, processing compensation payments for victims of terrorist attacks. This made him a target of the Zionist-revisionist Irgun and he was once kidnapped by this organisation. After Israel's independence in 1948, Ullendorff went to England, where he taught Arabic to colonial service cadets at the Oxford Institute of Colonial Studies. At the University of Oxford Ullendorff completed his DPhil dissertation about The relationship of modern Ethiopian languages to Geʽez (Classical Ethiopic) under the supervision of G. R. Driver in 1951.

In 1950 Ullendorff was appointed lecturer, and in 1956 Reader in Semitic Languages at the University of St Andrews. From 1959 to 1964 he served as Professor of Semitic Languages and Literatures at the University of Manchester. In 1964, Ullendorff was appointed to a foundation chair for Ethiopian Studies at the School of Oriental and African Studies (SOAS) created especially for him, being the first chair for this discipline worldwide. When Judah Segal retired in 1979, Ullendorff succeeded him in the chair of Semitic Languages at SOAS. On his own retirement in 1982, the University of London appointed him Professor Emeritus of Semitic Languages and Ethiopian Studies. To Ullendorff's regret, however, no successor was appointed to either chair.

In 1971, Ullendorff served as president of the Society for Old Testament Study.

Ullendorff's wife Dina provided lifelong support for his academic research and translated Mélanie Oppenhejm's book Theresienstadt: Survival in Hell under her own name. Dina Ullendorff died in 2019.

Edward Ullendorff died on 6 March 2011 in Oxford, aged 91.

== Ark of the Covenant ==
According to local legend, the original Ark of the Covenant is supposedly held in the Church of Our Lady Mary of Zion in Axum, Ethiopia. In a 1992 interview, Ullendorff stated that he personally examined the ark held within the church in Axum in 1941 while a British army officer. Describing the ark there, he described it as a "Middle- to late-medieval construction, when these were fabricated ad hoc."

== Honours ==
In 1965, Ullendorff was elected a Fellow of the British Academy (FBA), serving as the academy's vice-president from 1980 to 1982. He was chosen for the 1967 Schweich Lecture on Biblical Archaeology which he gave on the subject of "Ethiopia and the Bible". The Ethiopian emperor Haile Selassie honoured Ullendorff with the Haile Selassie International Prize for Ethiopian Studies in 1972. He repeatedly met with the monarch, who was overthrown in 1974 and assassinated the following year. Ullendorff translated and edited Haile Selassie's autobiography, which was published in 1976. In 1998, the Accademia dei Lincei elected him as a foreign member, being one of only a few British scholars in that academy.

After Ullendorff's death, the British Academy created the Edward Ullendorf Medal in 2012 which is awarded annually for "scholarly distinction and achievements in the field of Semitic Languages and Ethiopian Studies."

== Selected works ==
- Exploration and Study of Abyssinia. A Brief Survey (1945)
- The Semitic Languages of Ethiopia. A Comparative Phonology (1955)
- Hebraic-Jewish Elements in Abyssinian (Monophysite) Christianity (1956)
- An Amharic Chrestomathy (1965)
- The Challenge of Amharic (1965). An inaugural lecture delivered on 28 October 1964
- The Ethiopians: An Introduction to Country and People (1966)
- Ethiopia and the Bible (1968) Schweich Lectures of The British Academy (1967). Oxford University Press.
- Is Biblical Hebrew a Language? Bulletin of the School of Oriental and African Studies 34.2:241-255 (1971)
- Some Early Amharic letters. Bulletin of the School of Oriental and African Studies 35.2:229-270. (1972)
- Autobiography of Emperor Haile Selassie of Ethiopia (1978), translator
- The Amharic Letters of Emperor Theodore of Ethiopia to Queen Victoria and Her Special Envoy (1979), with David L. Appleyard, Girma-Selassie Asfaw
- The Hebrew Letters of Prester John (1982), with C. F. Beckingham.
- A Tigrinya Chrestomathy (1985)
- The Two Zions : Reminiscences of Jerusalem and Ethiopia (1988). Oxford University Press.
- From the Bible to Enrico Cerulli A Miscellany of Ethiopian and Semitic Papers (1990)
- From Emperor Haile Selassie to H. J. Polotsky Collected Papers IV: An Ethiopian and Semitic Miscellany (1995)
