= Marjorie Stopford =

English Girl Guide leader

Lady Marjorie Stopford
- Born: 14 August 1904
- Died: 27 October 1996 (aged 92); Bushey, Hertfordshire, England
- Other name: Marina Marjorie
- Occupation: Girl Guide leader

Lady Marjorie Stopford (14 August 1904 – 27 October 1996) was a Girl Guide leader, Duke of Edinburgh awards advisor, and volunteer for the Guide International Service (GIS), serving in post-civil-war Greece.

== Family and personal life ==
Lady Marjorie Gertrude Stopford was the youngest child of James Walter Milles Stopford, the 6th Earl of Courtown and Baron Saltersford, and Gertrude Stopford, Countess of Courtown. She had four siblings and four half-siblings. She spent her childhood in Ireland at the family seat in Courtown House, County Wexford.

Stopford met her partner, Florence "Cobbie" Cobb (1910-2003) through Guiding in Hertfordshire in the 1930s. Stopford moved to Bushey, Hertfordshire in 1934. She and Cobb lived together for almost 60 years, moving into Bournemead, a house Stopford inherited, after World War II. She lived there until her death in 1996.

== Girl Guides ==
Stopford joined the Guiding movement as a Lone Guide in Branch A aged 15 in Ireland. She started her own Company, 1st Gorey, at the age of 21.

In the 1930s she was a member of the executive branch of Buckinghamshire Girl Guides where she and her mother both held a "high rank". She helped organise an international camp at Hatfield Park in 1938 and was Hertfordshire's County Camp Advisor from 1947 to 1957.

In the 1960s she played several roles: an advisor to Land Rangers, a member of South Hertfordshire's Duke of Edinburgh (DofE) Award Scheme Liaison Committee, the DofE advisor to Hertfordshire Guides and South Herts Division Commissioner.

From the 1970s into the 1990s she was a member of the Trefoil Guild.

=== Guide International Service ===
Stopford joined an 18-month training programme to become a volunteer for the Guide International Service (GIS) in 1942. In January 1944 she travelled to Egypt with other GIS volunteers under the leadership of Margaret Pilkington. The other members were Muriel Lees, Georgina Hall, Beryl Gibson, Rosamond Wansburgh, Alison Duke, Marjory Jarman and Maud Travers, together with two Scouts.

In January 1945, she was posted to Greece after the civil war where one of her first jobs was looking after hostages returned by the ELAS (Greek People's Liberation Army), including British hostages, together with refugees. The GIS volunteers ran a hostel and provided food and clothing. Later, they distributed clothing donated by the Greek War Relief organisations of Canada and America to people living in remote mountain villages. At one point, the team was billeted in Athens's Greek archbishop's house. She returned to the UK in November 1945.

=== Other international travel ===
Stopford returned to Greece in 1951 with a group of Rangers and Guides to take part in a two-week camp as part of an exchange with Greek Guides.

In January 1957 she led a party of ten Guides representing Great Britain to a world camp at San Bartoleme, Quezon City, Philippines. This was one of four international camps organised to celebrate the centenary of the birth of Lord Baden-Powell.
