= Brigantia =

Brigantia may refer to:

Goddess

- Brigantia (goddess), a goddess in Celtic mythology

Places

- Brigantia (ancient region) – the land of the Brigantes of ancient Britain, now North England
- the ancient Latin name of several cities and regions:
  - Bragança Municipality, Portugal
  - Bregenz, Austria
  - Briançon, France
  - Brianza, Italy
  - A Coruña, Galicia, Spain

== See also ==
- Brigantium (disambiguation)
