= Letheringsett Brewery watermill =

Letheringsett Brewery Watermill, Norfolk
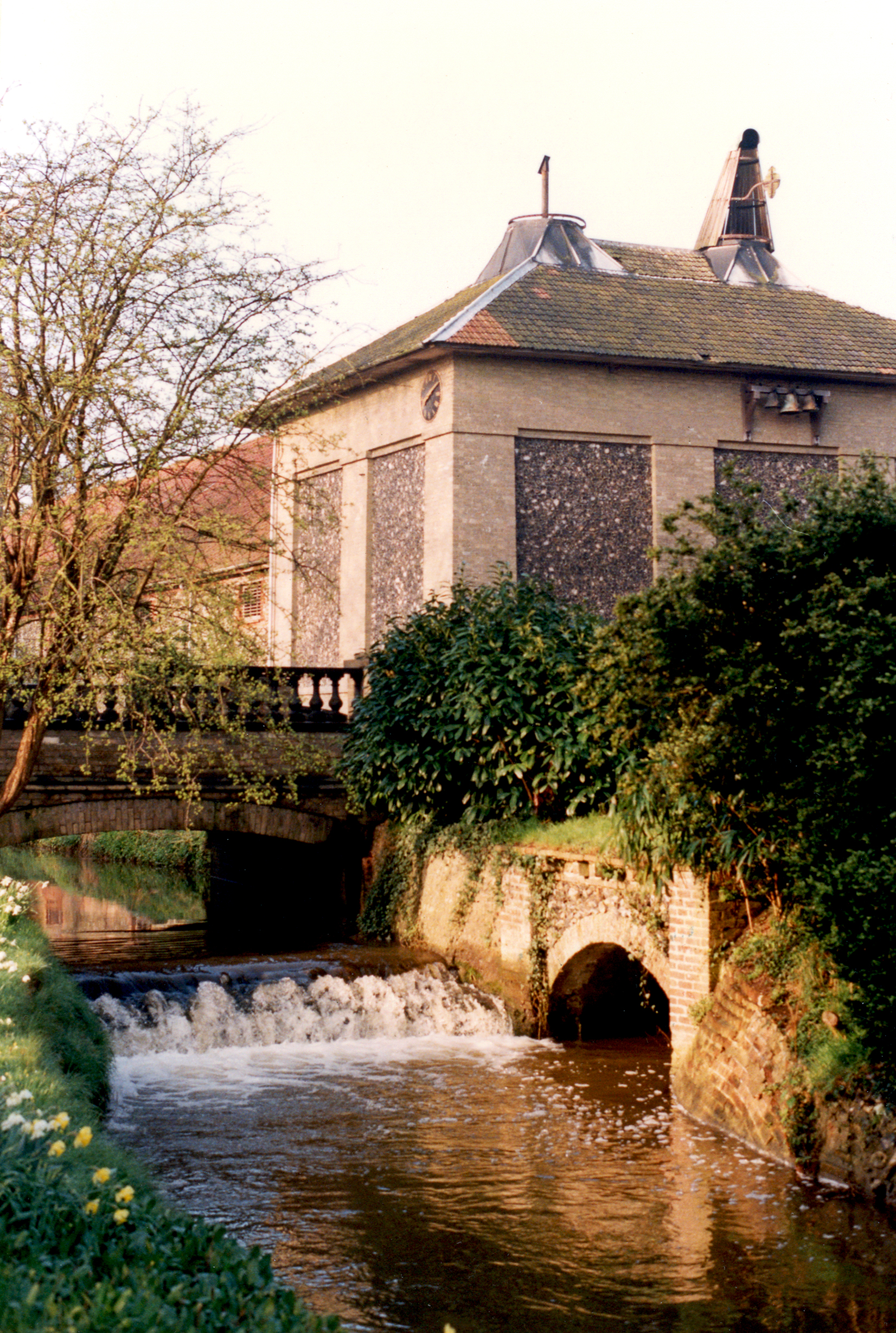
- Letheringsett Brewery Watermill: the cascade and waterwheel tunnel built 1783–84, with the bridge of 1818

Watermill
- Architectural style: Flint and brick with Norfolk ridge-pattern pantile roof
- Location: Beside the River Glaven in Letheringsett, near the town of Holt; Norfolk, England
- Owner: William Hardy 1784–1797; William Hardy junior 1797–1842; William Hardy Cozens-Hardy 1842–77; Cozens-Hardy & Son 1877–96; Morgans Brewery Co. Ltd 1896–43
- Coordinates: TG061388

Construction
- Built: 1784 within earlier maltings and brewery

The remains of Letheringsett Brewery Watermill are located in the centre of the village of Letheringsett in the county of Norfolk. The watermill of 1784 was housed within the maltings and brewery complex founded and run by John Brereton of Letheringsett Hall from before 1721. Much of this complex still stands on the south side of the A148 Cromer to King's Lynn road, which bisects the village on an east–west axis, and on the west bank of the River Glaven, which bisects the village south–north.

The watermill was in operation from 1784 to 1895 or 1896 for crushing malt and to power the pumps throughout the manufacturing and storage complex. It had a far more limited life as a cornmill for grinding wheat, from 1784 to about 1798, as recorded by the wife and mother of the owners, the diarist Mary Hardy. Briefly a ginger beer factory from 1896 to 1906, the complex then ceased all manufacturing. It was converted to housing 2013–15.

== Early history ==
The maltings and brewery are documented in the Letheringsett Laviles manor court book which records the manufacturers living in Letheringsett. John Brereton, John Priest and Henry Hagon were the first three maltsters and brewers from before 1721 to 1780.

In November 1780 William Hardy (1732–1811) purchased Letheringsett Hall, 50 acres of farmland and the late Henry Hagon's maltings, brewery and some of his tied houses for £1610 at auction at Holt. He was a Yorkshireman and a former excise officer; at the time of the purchase he was manager of a maltings and brewery at Coltishall, north-east of Norwich. He and his family moved to Letheringsett on 5 April 1781.

== Conversion to water power ==
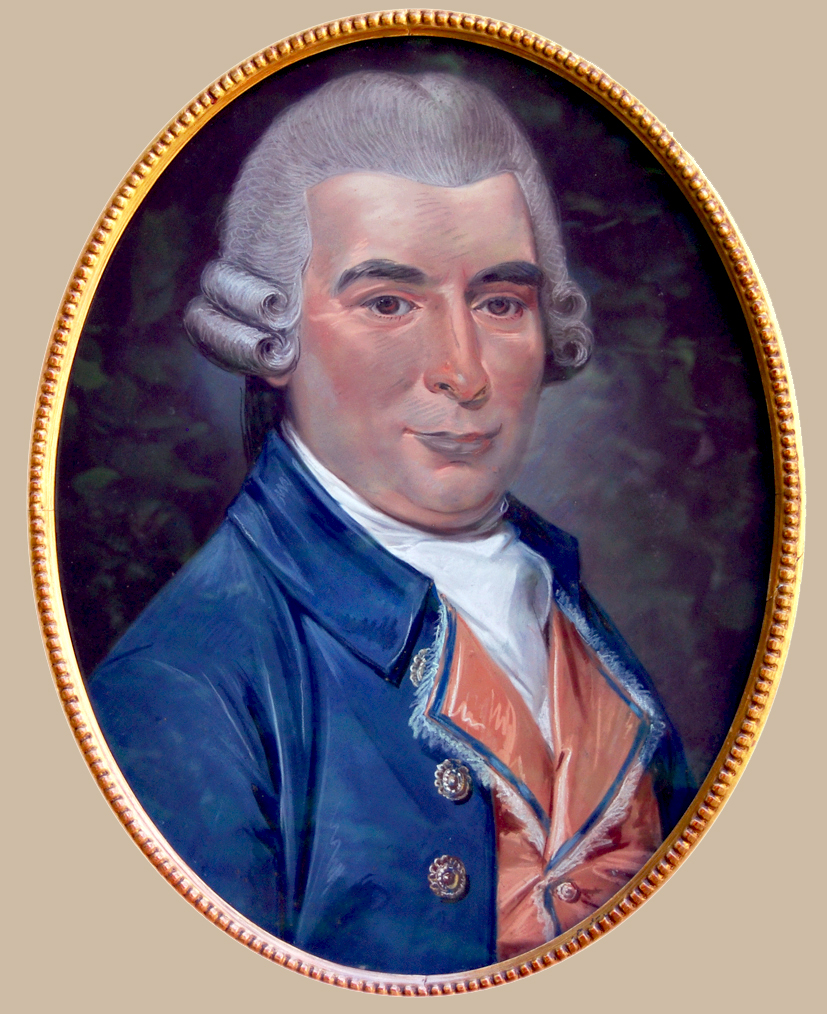
William Hardy (1732–1811), who converted his maltings and brewery to water power in March 1784 and also began grinding wheat later that year; portrait by Huquier 1785 (Cozens-Hardy Collection)

The Hall, malthouse and malt-kilns stood on the riverbank. William Hardy made the bold decision in 1784 to convert his maltings and brewery to water power, all the stages of the work being recorded in his wife's diary. Until then the malt had been crushed by an elderly horse harnessed in a horse gin.

The brewer cut a brick-floored channel from the River Glaven to run under his malthouse, through the brewery yard, and under the main Cromer road to rejoin the river flowing north at the point just downstream of the road bridge built in 1818 by his son William Hardy junior (1770–1842). (Note: Cast-iron inscription on the parapet of the road bridge still in use today.) The cascade north of the bridge, immediately upstream of the tailrace exit, reflects the drop to the waterwheel newly installed in the adjacent tunnel. The wheel could be set in either breast-shot or undershot positions according to the water flow.

As an offshoot of this mechanisation William Hardy decided to grind wheat for flour, using separate sets of grindstones for malt and wheat. Although he was maximising his investment he ran into competition with the miller at the centuries-old Letheringsett Watermill only 137 metres (150 yd) upstream, provoking a legal battle over water rights in 1786. That mill was considerably rebuilt and enlarged in 1798, although owing to the owner Zebulon Rouse's bankruptcy it did not go into production until 1802. The resulting increase in production by the competitor may have led to William Hardy junior's decision, as the new owner, to cease producing flour.

== The buildings ==
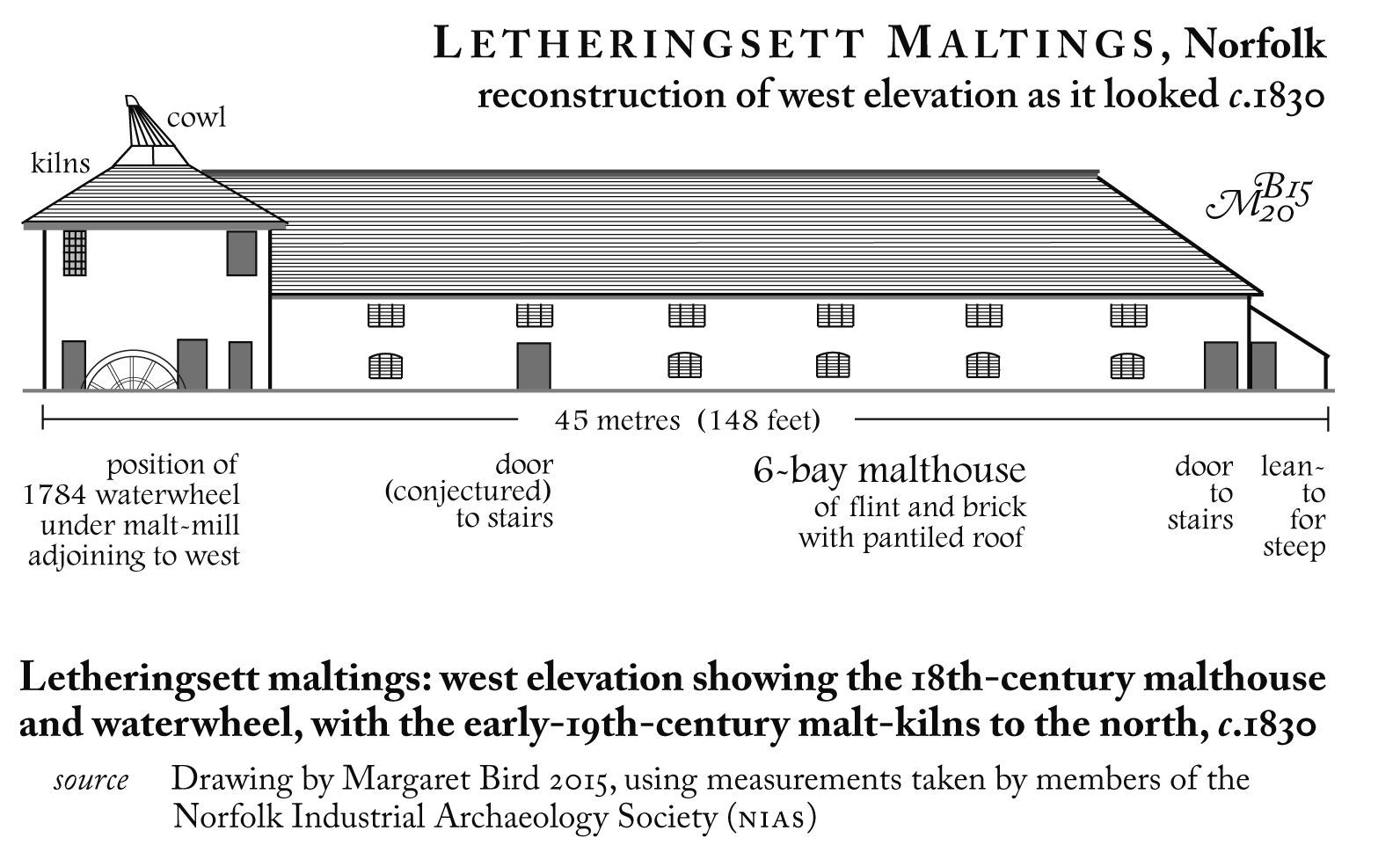
Reconstruction of the Letheringsett malthouse and kilns from the west in their working days, showing the waterwheel (left) in position under the malt-mill

The structures date from different periods. The earliest surviving building, the huge malthouse which with the kilns is 45 metres (148 ft) long, is probably of the mid-18th century; it predates the Hardys' arrival. The later parts, of the early 19th century, include the remodelled and expanded malt-kilns and the 1814 recladding of the large 18th-century tun room. Both buildings, and the brewery linking them, were designed by William Hardy junior's architect William Mindham (1771–1843). His trademark use of heavy eaves, textured roof tiles and recessed panels of flint between brick pilasters can be seen in the complex. The twin conical cowls, restored in 2002, atop the malt-kilns form a local landmark.

The brewery buildings ran west alongside the main road from the malt-mill beside the kilns to the tun room. They burned down in the fire of 24 April 1936 which also destroyed the waterwheel and malt-mill above it; the malthouse, kilns, tun room, stables, carpenter's shop and clerk's cottage east of the malthouse survived.

The wheel had last been used for malting and beer-brewing in 1895 or 1896, prior to the sale of the business to Morgans Brewery Co. Ltd of Norwich on 12 March 1896; their interest lay only in the tied houses. Morgan's did not go into beer production on the site, instead using it for a very few years to 1906 or earlier as a ginger beer factory and then for a further few years as a branch store for their bottled ginger beer. From 1903 a ram performed the waterwheel's remaining function of pumping water uphill to the former brewery reservoir of 1787.

== Later history ==
From the mid-1920s to the time of the 1936 fire the complex was rented and used by a motor haulage firm, Warne & Bicknell; two of their lorries and a steam wagon were destroyed in the fire. The Cozens-Hardys bought the site back in 1943, when it had recently been reduced on the northern side as part of road-widening to ease the dangerous bend by the brewery.

From 1992 various development plans were projected by successive owners, culminating in the restoration of the deteriorating buildings and the conversion to domestic housing of all the parts of the maltings and brewery, except the kilns, by D. and M. Hickling Properties Ltd from 2013 to 2015. The channel from the river to the tunnel for the former waterwheel can still be seen in the yard by the malthouse west wall as an ornamental water feature.

== See also ==
- Mary Hardy (diarist), wife of William Hardy
