= Pilkington Committee on Broadcasting =

The Pilkington Committee was set up on 13 July 1960 under the chairmanship of British industrialist Sir Harry Pilkington to consider the future of broadcasting, cable and "the possibility of television for public showing". One of the Pilkington Report's main conclusions was that the British public did not want commercial radio broadcasting, and it offered criticism of the existing commercial television licensees.

== Pilkington Committee ==
The members were:

- Sir Harry Pilkington
- Harold Collison
- Elwyn Davies
- Joyce Grenfell
- Richard Hoggart
- E. P. Hudson
- J. S. Shields
- R. L. Smith-Rose
- Elizabeth Whitley
- W. A. Wright
- Professor F. H. Newark (from March 1961)
- John Megaw (resigned 5 January 1961)
- Peter Hall (resigned 27 January 1961)
- Sir Jock Campbell (resigned 2 February 1961)

== Pilkington Report ==
=== For consideration ===
- renewal of the BBC Charter;
- licence fee funding;
- extending radio hours;
- adult education broadcasting;
- a third television channel;
- colour television on 625 lines;
- local broadcasting; and
- better commercial television regulation.

=== Television conclusions ===
The report, published on 27 June 1962, recommended the introduction of colour television licences and that Britain's third national television channel (after the BBC Television Service and ITV) should be awarded to the BBC. BBC2 was launched two years later. It also criticised the populism of ITV by attacking its American-originated acquired programming such as Westerns and crime series.

The committee recommended that the Independent Television Authority (ITA) should plan programming and sell advertising while the television programme companies should sell programmes to the ITA and not receive advertising money.

The report suggested that press interest in television programming companies should be reduced. This impacted newspaper groups with television interests, including Thomson Organization, Associated Newspapers and the Daily Mirror.

The report recommended the introduction of 625 lines television transmission without delay to replace the UK's 405-line television system.

=== Radio conclusions ===
The report recommended that the BBC should extend its activities to the creation of local radio stations in order to prevent the introduction of commercial radio.

=== Consequences ===
After the report, ITV increased to 37% its programs that ITA classified as "serious".

In deciding that the British public did not want commercial radio, it rejected requests for licences that were being sought by over 100 British registered commercial radio companies. Its immediate result was historic in nature because it inspired both the creation of a trade lobby group for commercial radio, and the establishment of ship-based pirate radio stations operating in international waters outside the jurisdiction of the British government. The best known of these was Radio Caroline whose transmissions began in 1964.
