= Brigantia (goddess) =

Tutelary goddess of the Brigantes in Roman Britain

Relief of Brigantia from Birrens, with the attributes of Minerva and Victoria (National Museum of Scotland, RIB 2091)

Brigantia was a goddess worshipped in Roman Britain, generally understood as the tutelary deity of the Brigantes, the large tribal confederation of northern Britain. She is known only from epigraphy and iconography. Her name occurs in seven Latin votive inscriptions of the 2nd and 3rd centuries AD, and she is nowhere mentioned by a classical author. Several of the dedications identify her with a Roman goddess, most often Victoria. The best-known monument, a relief from Birrens in southern Scotland, shows her with the attributes of Minerva and Victoria. Her name is cognate with that of the Brigantes themselves, and with the name of the Irish goddess Brigid. How closely the two goddesses are related is disputed.

== Name ==
The goddess's name is recorded only in Latin votive inscriptions from northern Britain, where it appears as Brigantia and, in most of the dedications, as dea Brigantia ('the goddess Brigantia'). Two of the inscriptions equate her with Victoria, as Victoria Brigantia, one with the Caelestis of North Africa and Syria, and one calls her a nymph, Nympha Brigantia. The theonym is not attested in classical literature, so that the evidence for the goddess is epigraphic and iconographic alone.

The name is a derivative of the Celtic adjective brigant- ('high, elevated, eminent'), from an Indo-European root *bʰerǵʰ- ('to be high'). It continues a Proto-Celtic form usually reconstructed as *Brigantī, understood as 'the exalted one' or 'the high one'. The same stem underlie the tribal name of the Brigantes themselves, the Brigantii near Lake Constance, and the very common Continental place-name element -briga ('hill' or 'hill-fort'), as in Sego-briga and Conim-briga. A related derivative *Brigantīnos lies behind the Welsh word brenin ('king'), taken to have meant originally the king as consort of the tribal goddess, and behind the royal title birikantin found on a Gaulish coin.

Old Irish Bríg and the divine name Brigid derive from the same stem, presupposing a form *Brigantī that corresponds exactly to the Sanskrit bṛhatī ('the high one'), an epithet of the dawn goddess Uṣas. Because the name is a transparent epithet rather than a distinctive personal name, it was probably borne by more than one Celtic goddess. On these grounds Jan de Vries and James MacKillop have connected Brigantia with the Gaulish goddess Brigindū, known from a single inscription.

== Cult ==
Brigantia had devotees in several places within the territory of the Brigantes, a large region reaching from Yorkshire to Dumfries and Galloway. The inscriptions cluster near Hadrian's Wall and in the areas that had formed the tribal lands, with an early nucleus of the tribe in the West Riding of Yorkshire. The dedicants include private individuals of Gallic or British name and senior Roman military and administrative personnel alike. At Brampton in Cumbria the imperial procurator Marcus Cocceius Nigrinus set up an altar to the nymph goddess Brigantia for the welfare of the emperor Caracalla.

In the surviving inscriptions Brigantia carries the names of several Roman goddesses. Two altars, from Greetland and Castleford in the West Riding, name her as Victoria Brigantia, linking the tutelary goddess of the tribe with military victory. At Greetland the dedicant, who describes himself as master of the sacred rites, was probably a priest of the goddess. At Corbridge, an army depot south of Hadrian's Wall, a centurion of the Sixth Legion named Gaius Julius Apolinaris dedicated an altar to a group of gods that included Jupiter Dolichenus and Caelestis Brigantia. Dolichenus and Caelestis were eastern divinities. Miranda Aldhouse-Green suggests that Apolinaris was himself of eastern origin and set his own gods beside the local one. At Brampton she is instead a nymph, a form that Anne Ross related to the wider Celtic association of a territorial goddess with sacred springs and streams.

The most fully worked image of the goddess is a relief from the Roman fort at Birrens (Blatobulgium) in Dumfriesshire, set above a short dedication to Brigantia by a man named Amandus. She faces the viewer, wearing a helmet surrounded by a mural crown in the form of a turreted wall, and holds a spear and a globe, with a shield resting on the ground beside her. The head of Medusa is carved between her breasts, and she is winged. A rounded stone beside her has been read as an omphalos. In these attributes she combines the gorgoneion and helmet of Minerva with the wings and globe of Victoria, so that the imagery is wholly Roman while the mural crown and the name mark her as the guardian of Brigantian territory.

Brigantia is also associated with rivers, and her name is preserved in that of the Brent in England, the Braint in Anglesey and the Brighid in Ireland. In the fragmentary early Welsh poem Gofara Braint the river Braint overflows at the death of a king, which Koch relates to the old idea of the goddess of the land as the ruler's consort.

== Interpretation ==
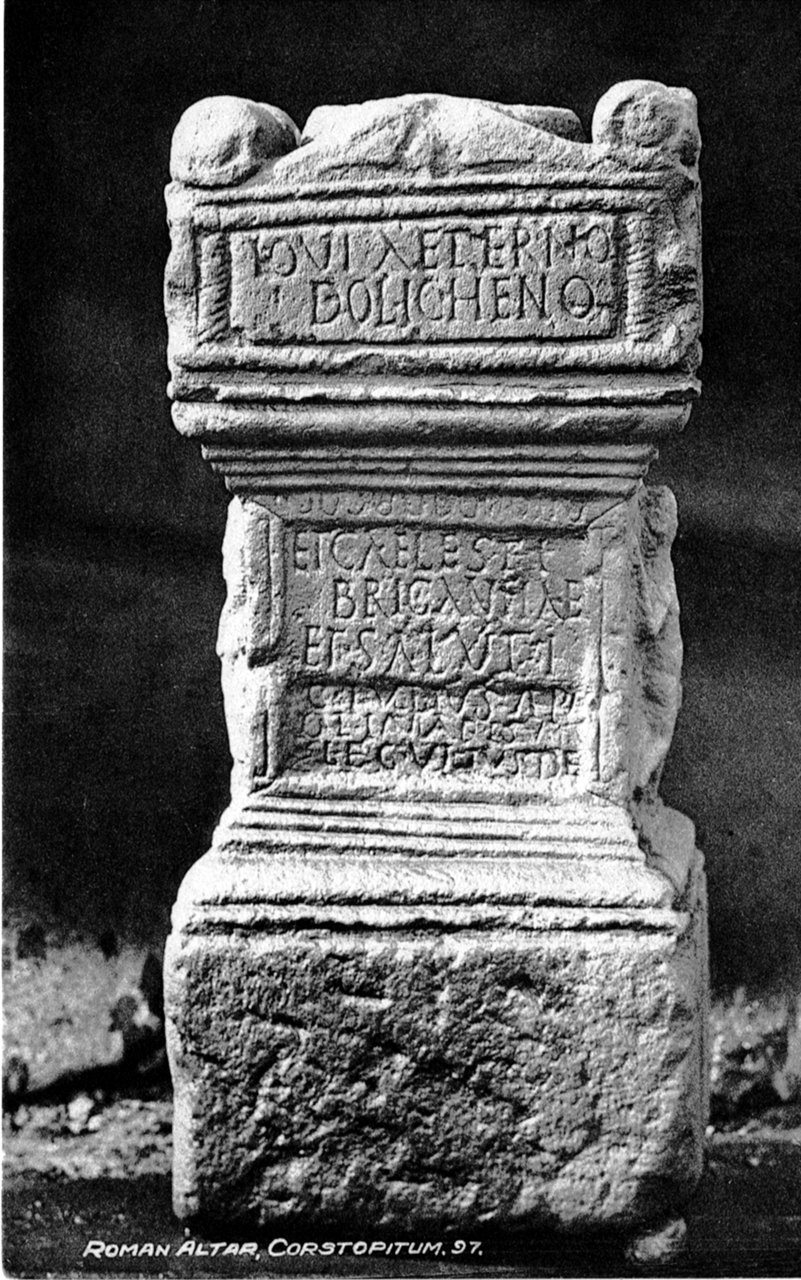
Altar to Jupiter Dolichenus and Caelestis Brigantia from Corbridge, on a 1910 postcard

The Brigantes took their name from that of their goddess, in the manner by which many Celtic peoples traced their descent from a divine ancestor. Brigantia is therefore read as the eponymous and tutelary deity of the confederation, a personification of the tribe and its territory who appears in Roman-period dedications clad as a Roman goddess. That so powerful a group should have looked to a goddess rather than a god has drawn attention to the standing of women among the tribe. The point has been made also with reference to Cartimandua, the historical queen of the Brigantes.

Anne Ross went further and set Brigantia within a broader Celtic idea of a great goddess who stood over the lesser tribal deities, comparing her with the Irish Anu and Danu and the Welsh Dôn. Later writers describe her more narrowly, as the tribe's own protecting goddess rather than a pan-Celtic mother figure. Her identification in the inscriptions with Victoria and, in the Birrens relief, with Minerva has been connected with the remark, reported from Julius Caesar, that the Gauls worshipped a deity comparable to Minerva. The Gaulish counterpart of Minerva was thought to be concerned with crafts and with healing waters, and John T. Koch places Brigantia beside the Gaulish goddess Belisama as a further Celtic figure of the same type.

Martin Henig has set the cult within the religious politics of the Severan age. Following Norah Jolliffe, he noted that all the datable dedications belong to the reigns of Septimius Severus and Caracalla, in the early 3rd century AD. On his reading the Severan division of the province left southern Britannia Superior to the established figure of Britannia, while the northern province of Britannia Inferior, most of which had been Brigantian land, was given a new personification in Brigantia, seen as a provincial tyche rather than an inherited Celtic deity. He further held that the Birrens relief, with its classical attributes and an omphalos of a kind associated with eastern gods, contains nothing that is specifically Celtic. He found little sign of the cult surviving the period, but allowed even so that the goddess had her origin in the region. Other writers continue to treat as the inherited tutelary deity of the Brigantes.

The relation of Brigantia to the Irish goddess Brigid is disputed. Both names derive from the same stem. Ross held that in the two goddesses there might be a single divine concept from a common source, continuing in the person of the Christian St Brigid of Kildare, whose functions and cult of a perpetual fire she compared with the pre-Christian material. Koch likewise treats Brigit as the equivalent of the Romano-British Brigantia. Bernhard Maier is more cautious. He argues that the correspondence of the two names follows only from the unspecific meaning of the shared epithet, 'the exalted one', and need not be explained by a common origin, drawing a parallel with the Irish Nuadu and the British Nodons, whose names likewise match without implying that the two are the same deity. On the strength of the Sanskrit cognate bṛhatī ('the high one'), an epithet of the dawn goddess Uṣas, Xavier Delamarre and Enrico Campanile take the name to continue that of an Indo-European dawn goddess. The reconstruction is given by Delamarre as *brign̥tī, from an earlier *bʰr̥ǵʰ-n̥t-ī ('the eminent one').

== Epigraphy ==
Brigantia is named in seven Latin dedications, all from northern Britain, chiefly from the West Riding of Yorkshire and the region of Hadrian's Wall. In most she is named alone, in two with Victoria, in one with Caelestis and in one as a nymph.

Text	Find-spot	Divine name(s)	Translation	Reference	Comments
D(eae) Vict(oriae) Brig(antiae) et Num(inibus) Aug(ustorum) T(itus) Aur(elius) Aurelianus d(edit) d(edicavit) pro se et suis se mag(istro) s(acrorum) Antonino III et Geta II co(n)ss(ulibus)	Greetland (West Yorkshire)	Victoria Brigantia	To the goddess Victoria Brigantia and the Divine Powers of the Emperors, Titus Aurelius Aurelianus gave and dedicated this for himself and his family, having been master of the sacred rites, in the consulship of Antoninus for the third time and Geta for the second.	RIB 627	Names her with Victoria and the imperial numina. Dated by the consular date to AD 208.
Deae Victoriae Brigant(iae) a(ram) d(edit) Aur(elius) Senopianus	Castleford (Lagentium)	Victoria Brigantia	To the goddess Victoria Brigantia, Aurelius Senopianus gave the altar.	RIB 628	Names her with Victoria.
Deae Brigan(tiae) d(onum) Cingetissa p(osuit)	Adel (West Yorkshire)	Brigantia	To the goddess Brigantia, Cingetissa set up this gift.	RIB 630	Named alone. The dedicant Cingetissa bears a Celtic name.
Deae Brigantiae sacrum Congenn(i)ccus v(otum) s(olvit) l(ibens) m(erito)	South Shields (Arbeia)	Brigantia	Sacred to the goddess Brigantia, Congennicus fulfilled his vow willingly and deservedly.	RIB 1053	Named alone.
Iovi Aeterno Dolicheno et Caelesti Brigantiae et Saluti C(aius) Iulius Apolinaris (centurio) leg(ionis) VI iuss(u) dei	Corbridge (Coria)	Caelestis Brigantia (with Jupiter Dolichenus and Salus)	To Jupiter Aeternus Dolichenus and Caelestis Brigantia and Salus, Gaius Julius Apolinaris, centurion of the Sixth Legion, set this up by command of the god.	RIB 1131	Identifies her with the eastern Caelestis, alongside Jupiter Dolichenus. Set up by a centurion of Legio VI.
Deae Nymphae Brig(antiae) quod voverat pro salute et incolumitate domini nostri Invicti Imp(eratoris) M(arci) Aureli Severi Antonini Pii Felicis Aug(usti) totiusque domus divinae eius M(arcus) Cocceius Nigrinus proc(urator) Aug(usti) n(ostri) devotissimus numini maiestatique eius v(otum) s(olvit) l(ibens) l(aetus) m(erito)	Brampton (Cumbria)	Nympha Brigantia	To the Nymph Goddess Brigantia, that which he had vowed for the welfare and safety of our unconquered lord the Emperor Marcus Aurelius Severus Antoninus Pius Felix Augustus and of his whole divine house, Marcus Cocceius Nigrinus, procurator of our Augustus, most devoted to his divine spirit and majesty, fulfilled his vow willingly, gladly and deservedly.	RIB 2066	Calls her a nymph goddess. Set up by the imperial procurator Marcus Cocceius Nigrinus for the welfare of Caracalla. Dated AD 211–217.
Brigantiae s(acrum) Amandus arc(h)itectus ex imperio imp(eratum)	Birrens (Blatobulgium)	Brigantia	Sacred to Brigantia, Amandus the architect set this up by command as ordered.	RIB 2091	On a relief depicting the goddess with the attributes of Minerva and Victoria. Now in the National Museum of Scotland.
