= Marjory Jarman =

English Girl Guide leader

- Born: 13 August 1901; Norwich, England
- Died: 1 January 1981 (aged 79); Cambridge, England
- Occupation: Girl Guide leader
- Website: jarmancentre.org.uk

Marjory Jarman (Note: Her name was sometimes misspelt as Marjorie) (13 August 1901 – 1 January 1981), also known as Jammie or Jamie was an English Girl Guide leader. She was a member of the Guide International Service (GIS), with whom she volunteered in Cairo, Egypt and Piraeus, Greece after WWII. In her will, Jarman bequeathed money to Cambridgeshire Girl Guides, who used part of the bequest to build the Marjory Jarman Centre, an outdoor centre in Newmarket.

== Personal life ==
Marjory Alice Jarman was born in Norwich to Louis John Jarman and Alice Julia Jarman, née Walford. She spent most of her life in Cambridgeshire. She worked as a cake maker and confectioner, and also a personnel officer at Chivers and Sons. During WWII Jarman worked as a Queen's Messenger.

She died in Addenbrooke's Hospital after an operation.

== Girl Guides ==
Jarman joined the 12th Cambridge Girl Guide company in 1916. In 1919, she appeared in a music concert presented by Cambridge Guides, together with Marguerite de Beaumont, who would go on to write biographies of Lord and Lady Baden-Powell.

In 1920 she established, and until 1957 ran, the 14th Cambridge Land Ranger company. Between 1942 and 1953 she was the first camp advisor for Cambridge county Guides. In 1943 she founded Cambridge City Trefoil Guild.

Jarman was awarded the Beaver Award, one of Guiding's highest awards, in 1957 and the Medal of Merit. In her obituary Jarman was described as "the mother of Cambridgeshire Guiding".

== Guide International Service (GIS) ==
In June 1944, Jarman was part of the first Guide International Service (GIS) team made up of British adult Girl Guide volunteers to travel overseas where she volunteered at a hospital in Cairo. The team included team leader Margaret Pilkington, also Marjorie Stopford, Alison Duke, Muriel Lees, Georgina Hall, Beryl Gibson, Maud Travers and Rosamund Wansburgh.

By May 1945 she was in Piraeus, Greece, where the GIS were asked to turn a disused orphanage into a centre for displaced people. It had no water, lights, fuel, sanitation or furniture. On the same day "250 Greek soldiers, thirty-six women (six of them pregnant) and ten babies arrived" at the centre, seeking shelter, food and medical aid. The British Army had provided the centre with two days' worth of rations and the team had "one tin-opener, one knife and one first-aid kit" between them. In September 1945 it was reported in an Australian newspaper that "the nerves of the Greek women were so strained after years of Nazi occupation that they shed floods of tears when handed cups of hot tea by the Guides. Marjorie Jarman said the cry did them as much good as the tea, as it made them realise someone cared about them."

By December there were 600 displaced people living at the centre. The team ran the centre for a year, until the following May. At a speech in Cambridge in 1950 the Chief Guide, Olave Baden-Powell said "You might be well proud of what those two [the second person being Alison Duke] did in the G.I.S. team helping the Greek Guides get started again."

== Other service ==
Jarman received the Women's Royal Voluntary Service Medal in 1961 for 22 years of service, completing 40 duties a year.

== Post-humous recognition ==
In her will Jarman bequeathed £90,000 to Cambridge South-East District Guides. £30,000 of it was used to start the fund-raising effort to build an outdoor centre in Newmarket, Cambridgeshire. The Marjory Jarman Centre was built on a 6-acre site and completed in November 1988.
