= Brigantium =

The ancient Latin name Brigantium may refer to:

- A Coruña, Galicia, Spain
- Betanzos, Galicia, Spain
- Bregenz, Vorarlberg, Austria (Bregenz was called Brigantium by the Romans)
- Briançon, Provence-Alpes-Côte d'Azur, France
- Bragança (Portugal), Trás-os-Montes, Portugal
- Isurium Brigantum, Aldborough, North Yorkshire, England
- Breganze, Veneto, Italia

== See also ==
- Brigantia (disambiguation)
