= Marguerite de Beaumont =

English Girl Guide leader and horse breeder

- Marguerite de Beaumont from a 1931 newspaper article
- Born: Julia Caroline Jane Marguerite de Beaumont-Klein; 13 May 1899; Barton upon Irwell, Lancashire
- Died: 30 July 1989 (aged 90); Marlborough, Wiltshire
- Resting place: St Michael and All Angels Church, Shalbourne, Berkshire
- Other names: Marguerite de Beaumont-Klein; Marguerite Julia Caroline Jeanne de Beaumont; Marguerite Julia Caroline Klein
- Occupations: Author; Poet; Horse-breeder; Girl Guide leader
- Partner: Doris Mason

Marguerite de Beaumont (13 May 1899 – 30 July 1989) was a Girl Guide leader, horse breeder, author and poet. She published biographies of Lord and Lady Baden-Powell, and was a recipient of the Silver Fish Award, Girl Guiding's highest adult honour.

== Family and personal life ==
Marguerite Julia Caroline de Beaumont-Klein was born in Lancashire, the middle child of mother Kathleen Mary O'Hagan and father Louis Charles Leopold Martial de Beaumont-Klein. She was baptised in 1905 at St George's, Bloomsbury. She spent her childhood in Norfolk, moving to Cambridge, where her father was a lecturer at the university, in 1915. The family dropped Klein from their name during the First World War.

In 1934 she bought Shalbourne Manor in Marlborough, Wiltshire with her partner Doris Mason (1904–1964). Mason ran the farm, while de Beaumont ran Shalbourne Stud. During the Second World War they welcomed a dozen evacuees from East London's docks. The dining room at the manor was converted into an emergency surgery, equipped at their own expense, to treat wartime casualties. In January 1945 the couple donated land to provide recreation facilities for returning World War II service personnel.

de Beaumont died in Marlborough and was buried at St Michael and All Angels Church in Shalbourne, Berkshire. Mason having pre-deceased her, de Beaumont left her entire fortune of £3 million, plus Shalbourne Manor, to her equine vet.

== Girl Guides ==
=== Founding and the 1909 Crystal Palace Scout Rally ===
In 1908 Baden-Powell's Scouting for Boys was published, inspiring groups of boys to organise themselves in Boy Scout patrols, which evolved into Boy Scout troops, consisting of several patrols. In the same year de Beaumont created the Wolves Patrol, comprising a small group of girls and boys, with herself as patrol leader. They registered as a Scout troop using their initials rather than their clearly gendered forenames. In a recording made in 1978, de Beaumont said:

We simply dressed ourselves, turned our stockings down on our knees, collected all the broomsticks we could find in the broom cupboard and went to Scout HQ and bought scout hats, which in those days you could do. They didn't ask us who we were, or anything about it. It was a mixed patrol, we had two little boys, I think four little girls ... and we used to do Scouting.

— Marguerite de Beaumont (1978)

de Beaumont was one of approximately 1,000 girls amongst 11,000 boys who showed up at the 1909 Crystal Palace Scout Rally. The apocryphal story that this was the first time Baden-Powell had met Girl Scouts has been demonstrably proved to be a myth. Baden-Powell's regular column in the 16 January 1909 edition of The Scout magazine read: "I have had [Christmas] greetings from many Patrols of Girl Scouts, for which I am very grateful. They make me feel very guilty at not having yet found time to devise a scheme of Scouting better adapted for them; but I hope to get an early opportunity of starting upon it. In the meantime they seem to get a good deal of fun and instruction out of Scouting for Boys, and some of them are really capable Scouts." de Beaumont's patrol arrived at the rally an hour late and without tickets. This behaviour drew the Chief Scout's attention, but when challenged, de Beaumont replied, "I am the PL of the Wolves Patrol of the Girl Scouts and we want to do Scouting just like the boys."

Soon after the rally Baden-Powell published two pamphlets about Girl Guides and the following year the Girl Guides Association was established, with Baden-Powell's sister, Agnes, as President. de Beaumont went on to become close personal friends with the Baden-Powell family, writing biographies of both Lord and Lady Baden-Powell.

=== Guiding in Cambridgeshire ===
For de Beaumont, Guiding was a family affair. Her mother, the Hon. Mrs de Beaumont, was County Commissioner for Cambridgeshire Girl Guides from 1916–1945, her sister Elizabeth was the county's first Secretary and Camp Advisor and her brother Charles was a member of the Scouts.

In 1919 de Beaumont was involved in a concert given by Cambridge and County School Girl Guides. Between 1924 and 1927 she was Cambridge District Captain and Captain of 5th Cambridge Company. In 1927 she took over her sister's role training Guides in Cambridgeshire. In 1928 and 1929 she conducted a Guide choir as part of a pageant depicting the history of Girl Guides. In 1930 she travelled to Switzerland to train British and Swiss Girl Guides. To celebrate the Guide movement's "Coming Of Age" (21 years) in 1932, she organised the largest camp in Cambridgeshire's history, with 600 Guides at Chippenham Park. In the same year she was awarded a red cord distinction diploma. Two years later she received the Silver Fish Award, Girl Guiding's highest adult honour. After leaving Cambridge to move to Shalbourne Manor in 1934, she remained involved in the county's Guiding, as leader of the Cambridge Sea Ranger Crew.

When the Jarman Centre – Cambridgeshire East's residential Girlguiding centre, named in honour of Marjory Jarman, opened in Newmarket in 1988, rooms were named in honour of de Beaumont, her sister and her mother in recognition of their early roles in local Guiding.

=== Guiding in Wiltshire ===
After moving to Marlborough in 1934 de Beaumont became involved with Guiding there. Her partner, Mason, was also a Guider and Scout volunteer. Between 1936 and 1938 de Beaumont was Division Commissioner for North Wiltshire Division Girl Guides. In 1956 she was made Auxiliary Advisor to the Guide Commonwealth HQ.

=== Scouting ===
In the early 1930s de Beaumont was Akela of 61st Cambridge Great Shelford Pack. In 1932, together with her mother, she was involved in the United Council of Christian Witness for Cambridge's "Week of Youth", with Guide and Scout leaders heavily involved. In 1936 she organized an Ely Rally for the Scouts. In Wiltshire, she ran the Shalbourne Scout Troop from her loft over the garage of Shalbourne Manor.

== Horse breeder ==
de Beaumont has been called "the far-famed owner of the Shalbourne Stud" and "the doyenne of horse breeders". She owned champion hacks Honeysuckle and Junifer, Arab stallion Shagya Basa, and Champion Highland pony mare Kirsty of Coignafearn. In 1948 she acquired the entire Wentworth stud of Welsh mountain ponies, including "the legendary" Coed Coch Glyndwr, together with many famous mares. She was "perhaps the most successful of modern breeders" of polo ponies, establishing a "dynasty" with the hack champion June XI.

== Publications ==
- 1934 – Adventuring and Other Poems. Heath Cranton Ltd. (A collection of 60 poems with a foreword written by Lord Baden-Powell.)
- 1935 – Road Across The Downs. Heath Cranton Ltd.
- 1944 – The Wolf That Never Sleeps: A Story of Baden-Powell. London: Girl Guides Association
- 1950 – World Adventure: A Story of the Chief Guide. Girl Guide Association
- 1951 – Yarns on the Tenderfoot. Girl Guides Association
- 1953 – The Way of a Horse, illustrated by Beatrice White. Hurst and Blackett.
- 1963 – Help yourself to Stalking and Tracking. Girl Guides Association
- 1976 – Horses and Ponies: Their Breeding, Feeding and Management. J.A. Allen. ISBN 0851312209
- 1976 – Photographic Guide to Tail Plaiting. Riding School and Stable Management Ltd. ISBN 0905769023

She also contributed articles to Horse and Pony magazine and Riding magazine.
