= Mary Hardy (diarist) =

English diarist (1733–1809)

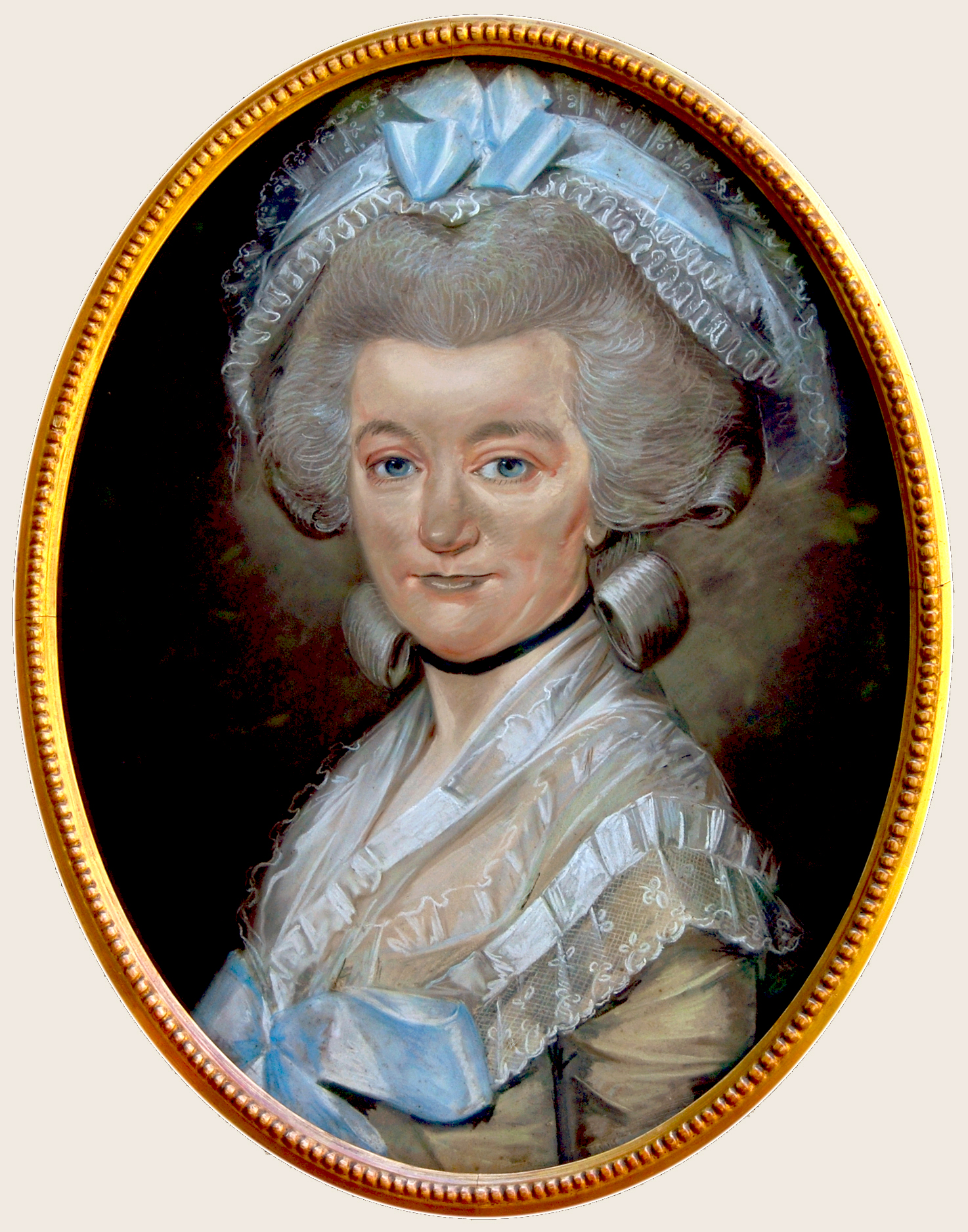
- Hardy in 1785 aged 51, by Huquier (Cozens-Hardy Collection)
- Born: Mary Raven; 12 November 1733; Whissonsett, East Dereham, Norfolk, England
- Died: 23 March 1809 (aged 75); Letheringsett, Holt, Norfolk, England
- Occupation: Brewer's wife (married Whissonsett 22 December 1765)
- Known for: Diarist
- Spouse(s): William Hardy (1732–1811), farmer and wholesale brewer
- Children: Raven Hardy (1767–1787); William Hardy (1770–1842); Mary Ann Cozens, née Hardy (1773–1864)
- Parent(s): Robert Raven and Mary, née Fox
- Relatives: Herbert Hardy Cozens-Hardy, 1st Baron Cozens-Hardy, Master of the Rolls; William H. Cozens-Hardy, 2nd Baron Cozens-Hardy; Hon. Beryl Cozens-Hardy

Mary Hardy (née Raven; 12 November 1733 – 23 March 1809) was an 18th-century English diarist. She depicted commercial and working life in the countryside, being actively engaged in her husband's farming and brewing business. Her 500,000-word record, compiled daily from 1773 to 1809, reveals the exacting, time-pressured nature of pre-mechanised work for the middle and labouring classes.

== Early life ==
Mary Hardy spent nearly half her life in the small village of Whissonsett, in central Norfolk, where her father Robert Raven was a grocer, maltster and later a farmer. She came from a long line of village shopkeepers, manufacturers and farmers in Norfolk, the county from which she never moved.

Maltsters, like brewers, were monitored by the Excise and had to adhere strictly to procedures and timings set by legislation. Living beside her family's small malthouse may have trained the young Mary Raven in the time-awareness and methodical work patterns seen later in her diary. Her meticulous recording lifts her from the obscurity in which she and her extended circle lived and gives insight into the forces to which they were exposed.

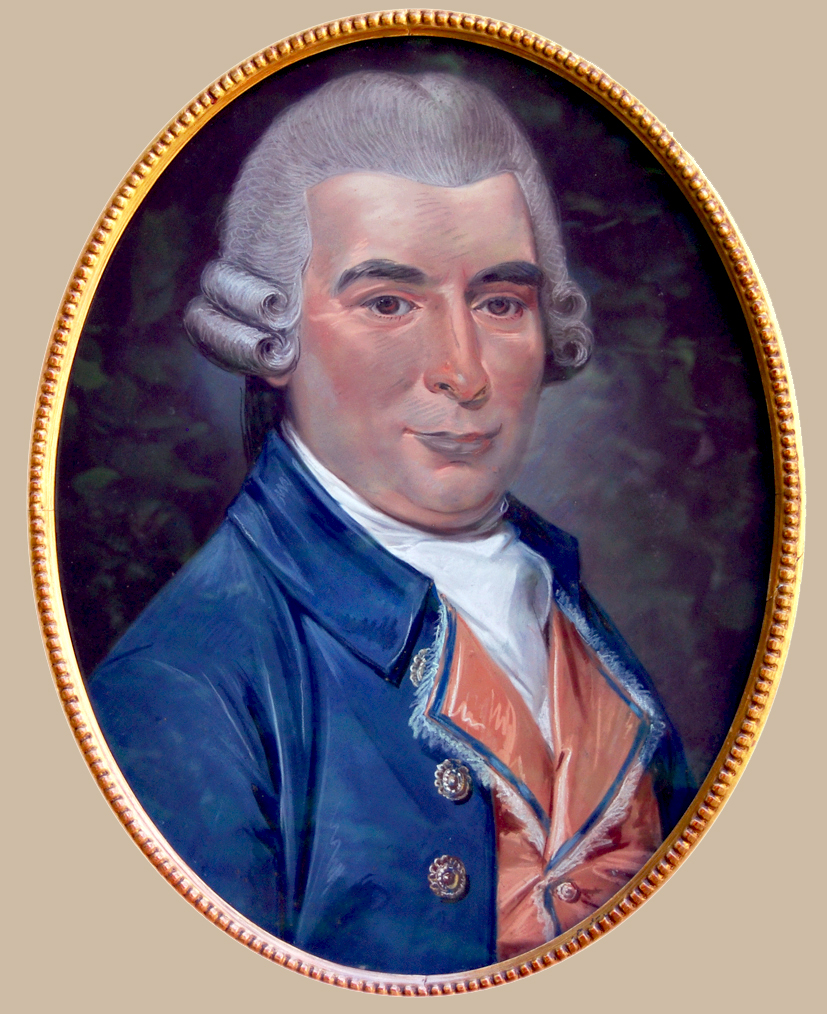
The brewer William Hardy in 1785 aged 53, by Huquier (Cozens-Hardy Collection)

Her husband William Hardy was born on 26 January 1732 at Scotton, near Knaresborough, in the West Riding of Yorkshire; he died 18 August 1811 at his daughter's farmhouse at Sprowston, near Norwich, Norfolk. He probably met his future wife while posted to East Dereham, a few miles from Whissonsett, during his years as an excise officer 1757–69. His official duties brought him into contact with maltsters, brewers, tanners and other rural manufacturers; his wife seems to have been most at ease with this "middling-sort" class, and they had few gentry friends.

Mary and William Hardy married in Whissonsett Church in 1765 when they were aged 32 and 33, and set up home at East Dereham. Their first child, named Raven for his mother, was born there 9 November 1767. Their second son, William, was born on 1 April 1770 at Litcham, in central Norfolk, where his father had been posted. The last child, Mary Ann (the grandmother of Herbert Cozens-Hardy, 1st Baron Cozens-Hardy), was born at Coltishall, seven miles (11 km) north-east of Norwich, on 3 November 1773; by then William Hardy was tenant of a 60-acre (24 ha) farm and manager of a commercial maltings and brewery.

Three weeks after giving birth to Mary Ann, Mary embarked on her 36-year diary, written in their small rented home beside the River Bure south of the church. This navigable river linked them to the sea at Great Yarmouth: cargo vessels, the keels and wherries, sailed deep inland along the network of the Broads. This was a period when wholesale brewers were busy acquiring retail outlets, and she charts the gradual process of tying pubs in these comparatively early days.

== Family business ==
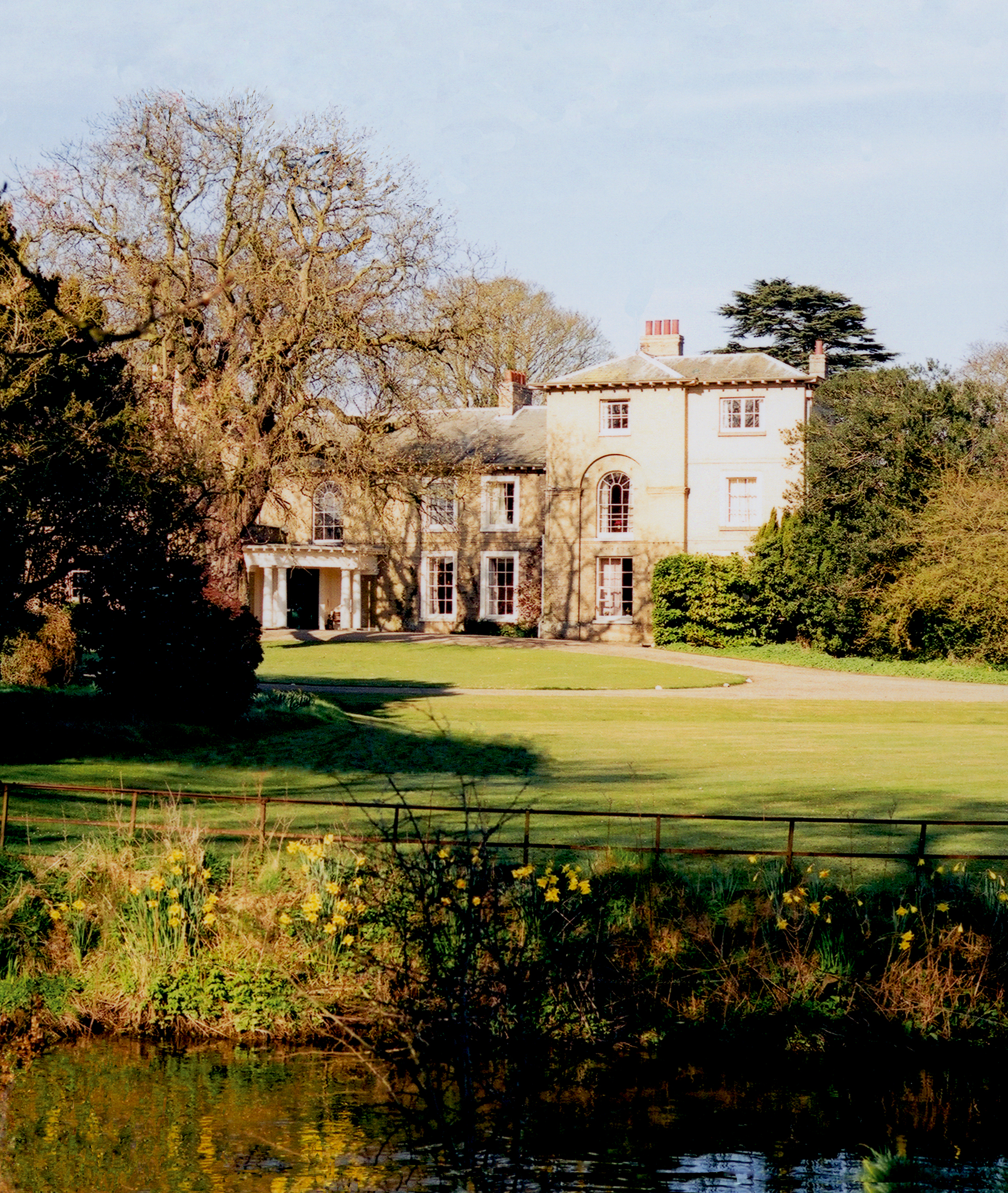
Letheringsett Hall, where Mary Hardy wrote her diary for 28 years

After nine years at Coltishall the family moved in 1781 to Letheringsett, near the north Norfolk coast. There they had the advantage of access to the small ports of Blakeney, Cley and Wells-next-the-Sea and were only a mile away from the town of Holt with its sample market in grain. By this time, William Hardy was no longer a tenant but owned his farm, maltings and brewery.

The Hardys ran what is known today as a vertically integrated business, seeing their product through from start to finish. The brewery’s small workforce performed every stage of the production for the beer to be sold at public houses. The workers handled the entire process, including farming the land, harvesting and malting the grain, brewing the beer, and delivering the barrels to outlets. They also made the hay to feed the horses. The brews included strong ale and mild; also nog, a local strong beer, and, from 1787, porter—a classic English beer style but, being capital intensive, an unusual choice then for a village brewery.

Mary Hardy reveals the hazards faced by the men. Through covering such subjects as distribution, by road, river and sea, she brings us close to the lives of working people; innkeepers and labourers feature daily at times. The men suffered broken arms and legs under the wheels of the beer cart and wagon in icy weather. In 1804 the diarist's son William Hardy Jr. (1770–1842) lost his small trading ship, a sloop named Nelly, in a storm off Blakeney; the captain and crew all drowned.

Water played a significant part in the business, providing liquor for the brews and serving as a highway for trade by sea and waterway; from 1784 water also powered the family's brewery. William Hardy expanded into producing wheat at Letheringsett Brewery Watermill within his maltings and brewery, powered by the River Glaven running past their home at Letheringsett Hall.

== Diary ==
The manuscript is remarkable not only for its length but in being written by a woman with very little education who recorded a man's world. It provides a counterpoise to the notion that life in the countryside was uneventful and unchanging; instead there was considerable mobility. The brewery draymen covered more than 500 miles (800 km) a month on top of their many other tasks.

In particular the diary reveals a completely different way of life from that described in vivid detail by Mary Hardy's famous contemporary and fellow Norfolk diarist, the Revd James Woodforde, based in his parsonage less than 20 miles (32 km) away from the two villages where she wrote her own journal.

The diary ranges exceptionally widely as the family were engaged in so many activities, from garden development and estate acquisition to politics and the defence of their home area during wartime invasion threats. Family matters were also to the fore, Mary Hardy and her husband being intimately engaged in the upbringing and training of their children. The diarist is notable for the breadth of her coverage and her restrained, unemotional style akin to log-keeping. The result is "one of the most consistent, revealing and enduring sources of its period".

== Conversion to Methodism ==
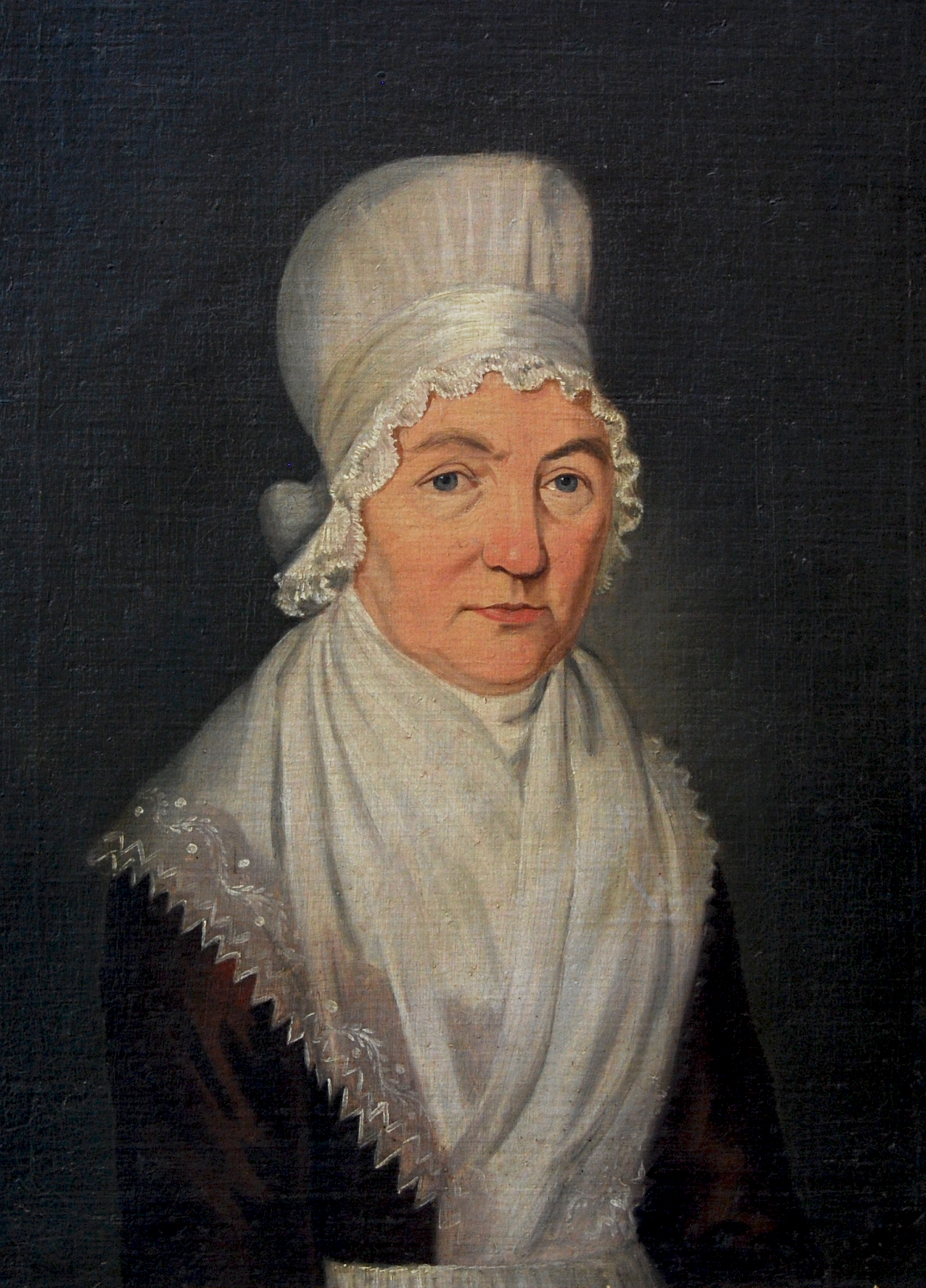
Mary Hardy in 1798 aged 64, by Immanuel; by this time she had become an active Methodist (Cozens-Hardy Collection)

Mary Hardy resembled Woodforde in being a loyal adherent of the Church of England, until in the mid-1790s she adopted Methodism as well. For a while she attended both church and meeting house. A few years before her death she ceased Anglican worship and became a fervent follower of John Wesley — not in purpose-built chapels but in cottage meetings. In 1808 she opened a meeting house in her washerwoman's small cottage.

== Death ==
Mary Hardy died at Letheringsett Hall on 23 March 1809, two days after making her last entry in her diary. She was buried in the family vault in Letheringsett churchyard, joining her elder son Raven who had died of tuberculosis in 1787 at age 19. William Hardy joined them in the churchyard on 22 August 1811.

== Nephew Henry Raven ==
The diarist's nephew Henry Raven (1777–1825) became the brewery apprentice and lived with the Hardys for eight years. The teenager's daily diary, 73,000 words long and covering 1793–97, is the only known surviving diary by an 18th-century English brewery apprentice.

== See also ==
- James Woodforde
- British Agricultural Revolution
- Beer in England, 1700–1899
