= Letheringsett Watermill =

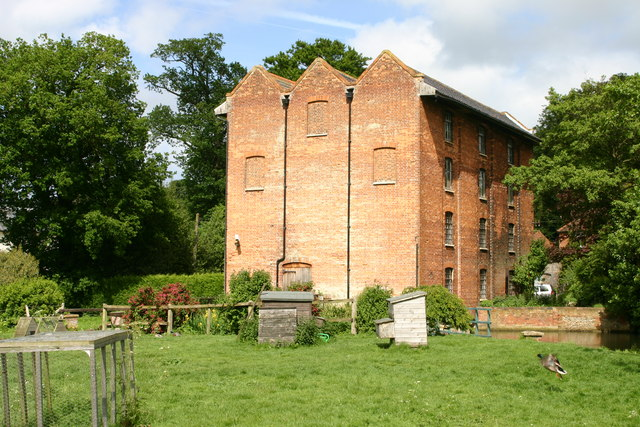
- Letheringsett Watermill west elevation.

- Location within Norfolk

General information
- Type: Watermill
- Location: River Glaven, Letheringsett, England
- Coordinates: 52.9062°N 1.0650°E
- Opened: Present mill 1802

Technical details
- Material: Brick built with black Pantile roof

Letheringsett Watermill is situated on the River Glaven in the village of Letheringsett, in the English county of Norfolk. Letheringsett is in the district of North Norfolk and is 1.4 miles (2.3 km) west of the town of Holt. The watermill is a Grade II* listed building and is the last fully operational watermill in Norfolk that produces flour.

== Description ==
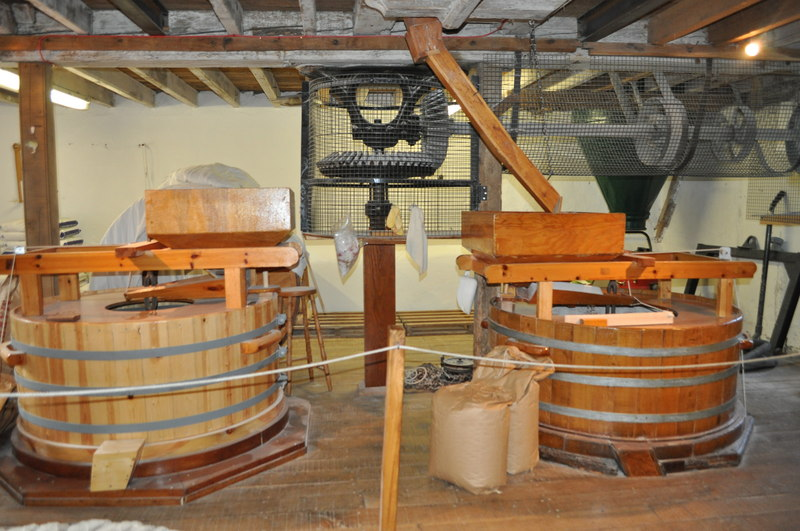
The two stones

The present mill was built in 1802, and is constructed of Norfolk red brick with a Norfolk black pantiled roof which over sail the walls at the eaves. This large watermill is constructed over four storeys and has three apexes on the gable ends. On the gable end there are bricked window fenestrations. The waterwheel was built with a dual irrigation system and was designed to run as breastshot but could be changed to undershot if water levels fell in times of dry weather. To increase the flow of water to the mill, sometime in the 19th century the height of the mill pond dam was increased by 2 feet (0.61 m). However this work proved troublesome as some of the fields in the vicinity would flood in severe weather antagonizing the local farmers who owned these fields

== History ==
The Domesday Book of 1086 mentions a watermill at 'Leringaseta'. The earliest recorded owner of the mill was Thomas de Saxlingham who owned the watermill in 1383. Today's mill replaced a watermill which had burnt down 1802 although this was not the first occasion the mill had been a victim of fire. Another mill on the site was also burnt to the ground in 1744. By 1941 the mill ceased using water as its main power supply. A Ruston & Hornsby diesel engine was installed. In 1984 the miller, Peter Warwick converted the mill from diesel power back to water power for the first time in 40 years. Then in 1987 a full restoration of the watermill was begun by Mike and Marion Thurlow

== Current operations ==
The watermill is a Grade II* listed building and is the last fully operational watermill in Norfolk that produces flour.

Letheringsett watermill benefited from the devastation caused by the Great Storm of 1987. The aftermath of that storm provided 200 oaks that were used to restore 2,000 feet (610 m) of beams and 10,500 feet (3,200 m) of flooring in the mill. The roof of the mill was also renewed but the major contract was the realignment of the waterwheel.

In 1990 the watermill opened its doors to the public. The mill produced 2½ tonnes of stone-ground wholewheat flour produced every week, which was sold both to the visitors of the watermill and to local businesses. Today this thriving mill produces many types of flour including whole wheat and spelt flour. All their products are available for purchase from the Mill shop along with a good selection of dried fruit, nuts, oats and muesli and other baking materials. Visitors to the watermill can see regular working demonstrations of milling and there are tours of the mill on most weekday afternoons although there is an admission charge. In 2007 further restoration work was completed with the grain floor and the bin floor being opened to the public. These floors are used as exhibition and education areas with displays of museum artefacts, photographs and video streams. The restored floors were officially opened to the public by North Norfolk MP Norman Lamb on 6 October 2007

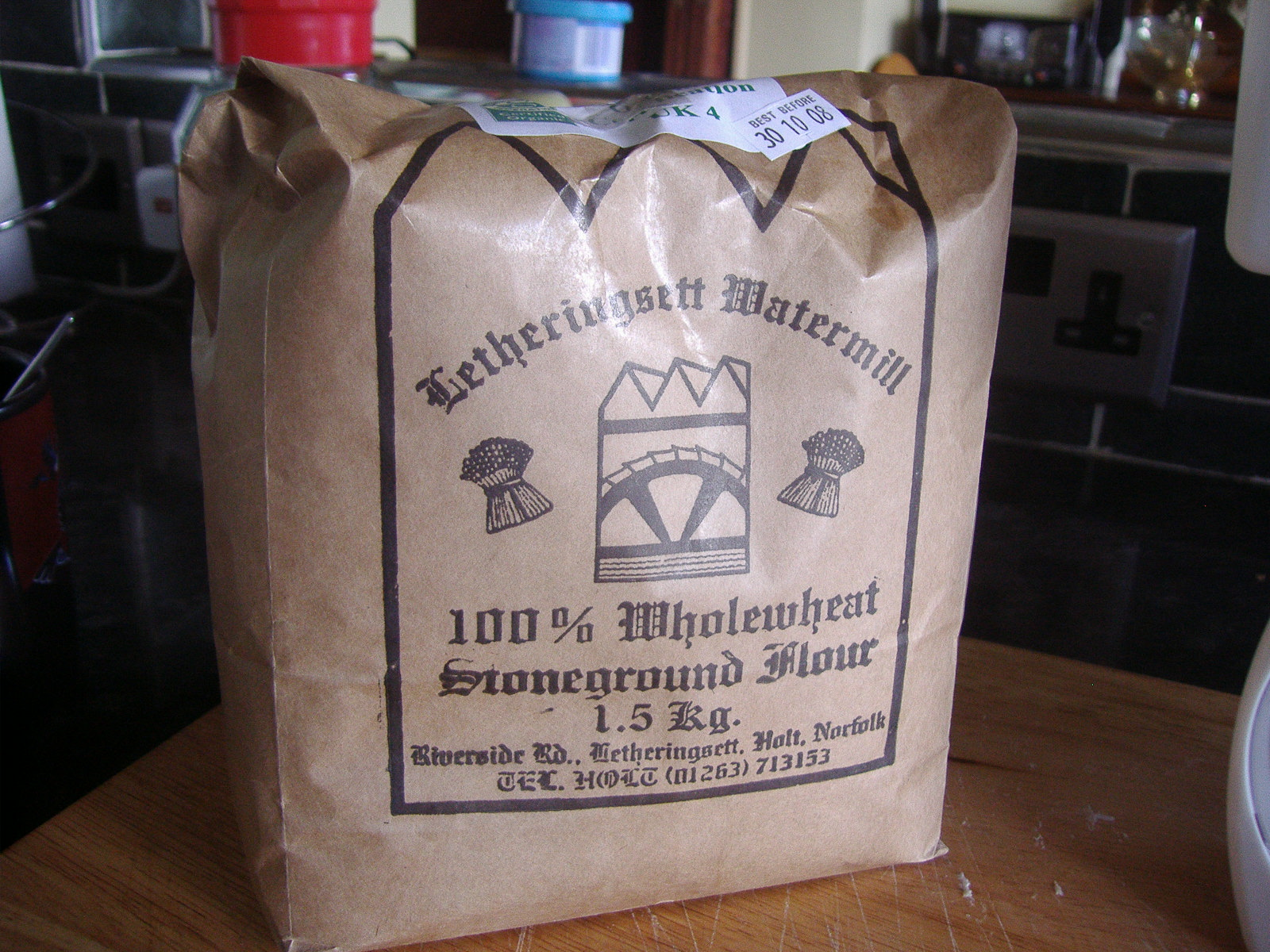
A bag of Letheringsett Wholegrain Flour
