= Hugh Austin Windle Pilkington =

British philanthropist (1942-1986)

Hugh Austin Windle Pilkington (18 April 1942 – 16 October 1986) was a British-born philanthropist who contributed to education in East Africa, particularly for refugees from Ethiopia and Eritrea.

Hugh Pilkington

== Family background ==
Hugh Pilkington was direct descendant of Richard Pilkington who in 1826 founded an early glass manufacturing company that in 1845 became Pilkington Brothers Ltd. Innovative methods of glass manufacture developed by the company resulted in the company earning great income, and members of the Pilkington family became beneficiaries of company trusts. Hugh Pilkington's father, Roger Windle Pilkington (17 January 1915 – 5 May 2003) became president of the London Missionary Society in 1962. Hugh, while still young, accompanied his father on travels overseas, including to East Africa.

== Education and early working life ==
Hugh was educated at Rugby School and King's College, Cambridge, and upon graduation was named the top classical scholar in his graduation year having gained a double first degree and was awarded a number of university prizes. He then worked for the family firm, Pilkington Glass. In Germany and elsewhere but came to realise that he was not suited to the world of commerce. He travelled to Africa to translate the Bible and in 1972 he joined the Theology and Philosophy Department of the University of Nairobi, eventually becoming a naturalised Kenyan citizen. He became interested in the book of Proverbs and its early manuscripts of Coptic origin. This launched him on an Oxford doctoral degree, and also required him to read manuscripts in Ge'ez, the almost extinct church language of the Ethiopian Orthodox Church. To learn Ge'ez, Hugh found two young Ethiopian refugees to teach him the language in exchange for board and lodging in his Nairobi home.

In 1979 Hugh was awarded a doctorate from Oxford. His doctoral thesis on the Ethiopic version of the Book of Proverbs remains the only scholarly record of this topic.

== Interest in education and refugees ==
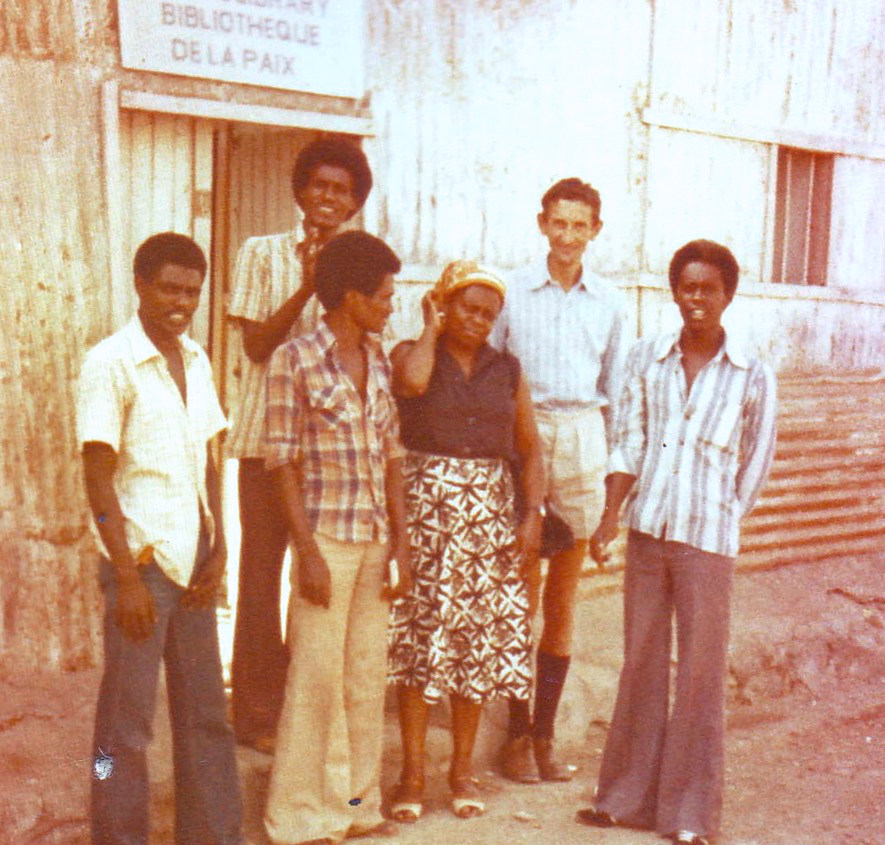
Pilkington visiting Djibouti in 1981 to assist refugee students to gain overseas scholarships in front of the library he assisted in establishing.

Through his contact with the two Ethiopian refugees who assisted him in his doctoral studies, he became increasingly involved with supporting other young refugees to continue their studies at universities in Africa and overseas. In 1977, he set up the Windle Charitable Trust in Kenya to support needy Kenyan students. In 1980 Pikington left his university post and dedicated himself full-time to providing educational opportunities, particularly for refugees. Hugh valued his own education highly and believed that good education was a key to promoting positive change in Africa and this became the vocation of the last ten years of his life: to help rebuild the lives of young Africans driven from their countries because of political beliefs and ethnic origins. He became increasingly concerned with the plight of African refugees arriving in Kenya and with the need for educational development in Kenya. He opened his home in Nairobi to refugees from other parts of Africa, particularly from Ethiopia and Eritrea, and subsequently financed their education in universities in the UK, North America and as far abroad as Fiji. He arranged for scholarship for hundreds of refugees; he was their counselor and their friend. He compiled a handbook of African universities for refugees, and helped run a small hostel for homeless refugees, presided over a teachers' committee for a refugee school, planned old people's homes and often assisted individual refugees including bailing detained refugees out of prison.

== Death and legacy ==
On 16 October 1986 he was knocked down by a motorist in Canada. At the time, he was on a tour of Canadian universities to speak about the plight of African refugees, promote university scholarships for refugees, and to visit African students whom he had helped to place in Canadian universities and colleges. As the UNHCR High Commissioner at the time, Jean-Pierre Hocké, observed, Hugh was an outstanding example of the capacity of one man to improve the human condition by individual effort. Before his death he had made arrangements for his personal estate to be used to set up a foundation to promote the education of refugees and in 1988 the Hugh Pilkington Charitable Trust (HPCT) was established in the UK. In 2002 Windle Trust International (WTI) was formed to manage the programmes of HPCT as a charitable company limited by guarantee. Since Hugh's death the Windle Trusts, which are built on the foundation of the work he started, have assisted over twenty thousand young people in Africa whose lives have been blighted by conflict.
