= Norah Jolliffe =

English archaeologist and academic (1900–51)

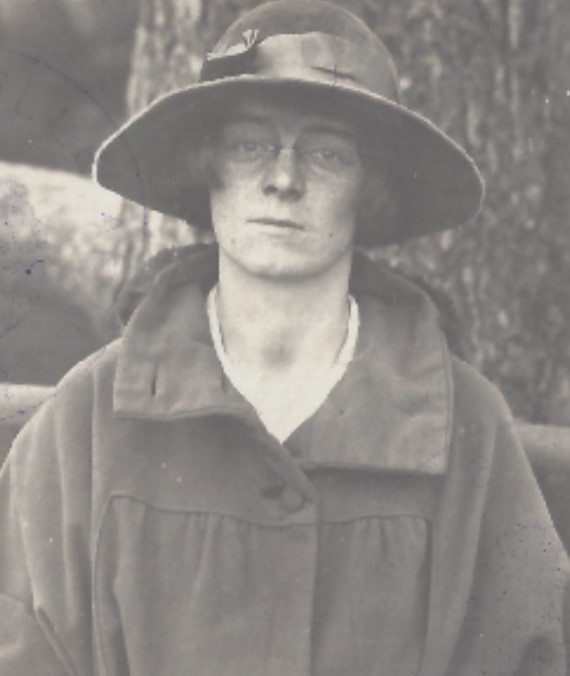
- Jolliffe in 1922
- Born: 1900; Abingdon
- Died: 1951 (aged 50–51); Cambridge

Academic background
- Education: Cheltenham Ladies' College
- Alma mater: Girton College, Cambridge

Academic work
- Discipline: Archaeologist
- Sub-discipline: Roman Britain
- Institutions: University of Reading, Royal Holloway, Girton College, Cambridge

Norah Christina Jolliffe (1900–1951) was an English archaeologist and academic specialising in Roman Britain. She lectured in Classics at the University of Reading, Royal Holloway, and Girton College, Cambridge.

== Life ==
Jolliffe was born in 1900 in Abingdon to Arthur Jolliffe, who was a fellow and tutor of Corpus Christi College, Oxford.

Educated at Cheltenham Ladies' College, she received a Higgins scholarship to study Classics at Girton College, Cambridge, where she received a first-class pass in 1918. She received a University Diploma in Archaeology in 1922. She then studied as a Gilchrist scholar at the British School in Rome, where she co-authored a paper on Roman stuccoes with the School’s Assistant Director, Eugénie Sellers Strong.

Jolliffe taught at the Girls’ Central Secondary School, Sheffield (1923–5) and Cheltenham Ladies’ College (1925–7).

In 1926, Jolliffe lectured in Classics at the University of Reading. She worked as the curator of the University’s Romano-British museum and held several committee roles.

In 1930–3, Jolliffe took part in Christopher Hawkes’ and Mark Reginald Hull’s excavations at Colchester.

After two years at Royal Holloway College as Senior Lecturer in Classics from 1934–6, she returned to Girton to direct studies in Classics and in Archaeology and Anthropology from 1936–1951. She was active in several societies for classical studies and, 1949, she became the first woman Chairman of Part I Examiners in the Classics tripos.

She died in 1951.

== Publications ==
- [with Eugénie Strong] 'The Stuccoes of the Underground Basilica near the Porta Maggiore', The Journal of Hellenic Studies 44:1 (1924), 65–111
- 'Dea Brigantia', The Archaeological Journal 98 (1941), 36–61
