= Baron Cozens-Hardy =

Title in the Peerage of the United Kingdom

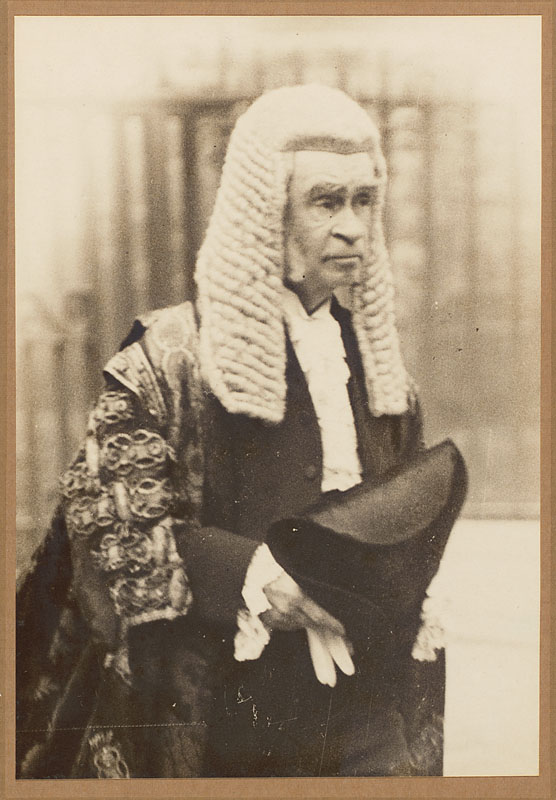
Herbert Cozens-Hardy, 1st Baron Cozens-Hardy.

Baron Cozens-Hardy, of Letheringsett in the County of Norfolk, was a title in the Peerage of the United Kingdom. It was created on 1 July 1914 for Sir Herbert Cozens-Hardy, Master of the Rolls from 1907 to 1918. He had represented Norfolk South in Parliament as a Liberal from 1885 to 1899. He was succeeded by his eldest son, the second Baron, who was in turn succeeded by his younger brother, the third Baron. The title became extinct on the death of the fourth Baron on 11 September 1975.

== Barons Cozens-Hardy (1914) ==
- Herbert Hardy Cozens-Hardy, 1st Baron Cozens-Hardy (1838–1920)
- William Hepburn Cozens-Hardy, 2nd Baron Cozens-Hardy (1868–1924)
- Edward Herbert Cozens-Hardy, 3rd Baron Cozens-Hardy (1873–1956)
- Herbert Arthur Cozens-Hardy, 4th Baron Cozens-Hardy (1907–1975)

Coat of arms of Baron Cozens-Hardy
Crest 1st a dexter arm embowed holding in the hand an eagle’s head erased fesswise Proper (Hardy); 2nd a lion rampant Or vulned at the shoulder Proper and gorged with a ducal coronet Azure. Escutcheon Quarterly: 1st & 4th per chevron Argent and Or in chief two fire balls Sable fired Proper (Hardy); 2nd & 3rd Azure a lion rampant Or gorged with a ducal coronet of the field in chief two barrulets of the second (Cozens). Supporters Dexter an eagle Argent wings endorsed Gules holding in the beak a white rose slipped and leaved Proper, sinister a winged lion queue fourchée Argent wings endorsed Gules. Motto = Fear One. Badge Upon a field Azure diaper of mascles and fleurs-de-lis Or an estoc (or thrusting sword) the blade enfiled with a baron’s coronet Proper the quillons terminating in fleurs-de-lis Or the hilt also Proper and the pomel Or thereon a rose Argent, with mottoes “Fear One” and “Je Sers”.
