= Herbert Cozens-Hardy, 1st Baron Cozens-Hardy =

British politician and judge (1838–1920)

The Right Honourable The Lord Cozens-Hardy PC
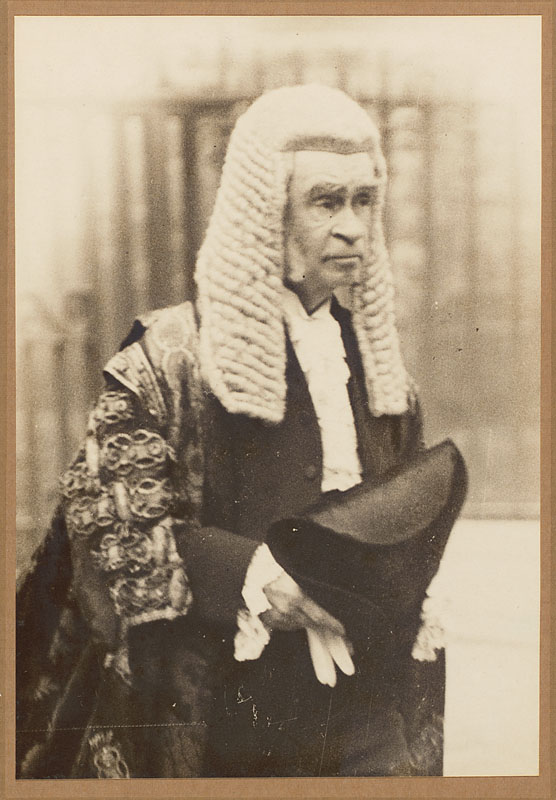

Master of the Rolls
- In office 6 March 1907 – 3 May 1918
- Preceded by: Sir Richard Collins
- Succeeded by: The Lord Swinfen

Personal details
- Born: Herbert Hardy Cozens; 22 November 1838 Letheringsett, Holt, Norfolk
- Died: 18 June 1920 (aged 81) Letheringsett, Holt, Norfolk
- Spouse: Maria Hepburn (d. 1886)
- Education: University College London
- Profession: Barrister, judge

Herbert Cozens-Hardy

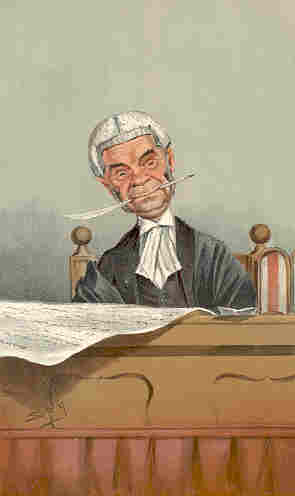
"fair, if not beautiful". Caricature by Spy published in Vanity Fair in 1901

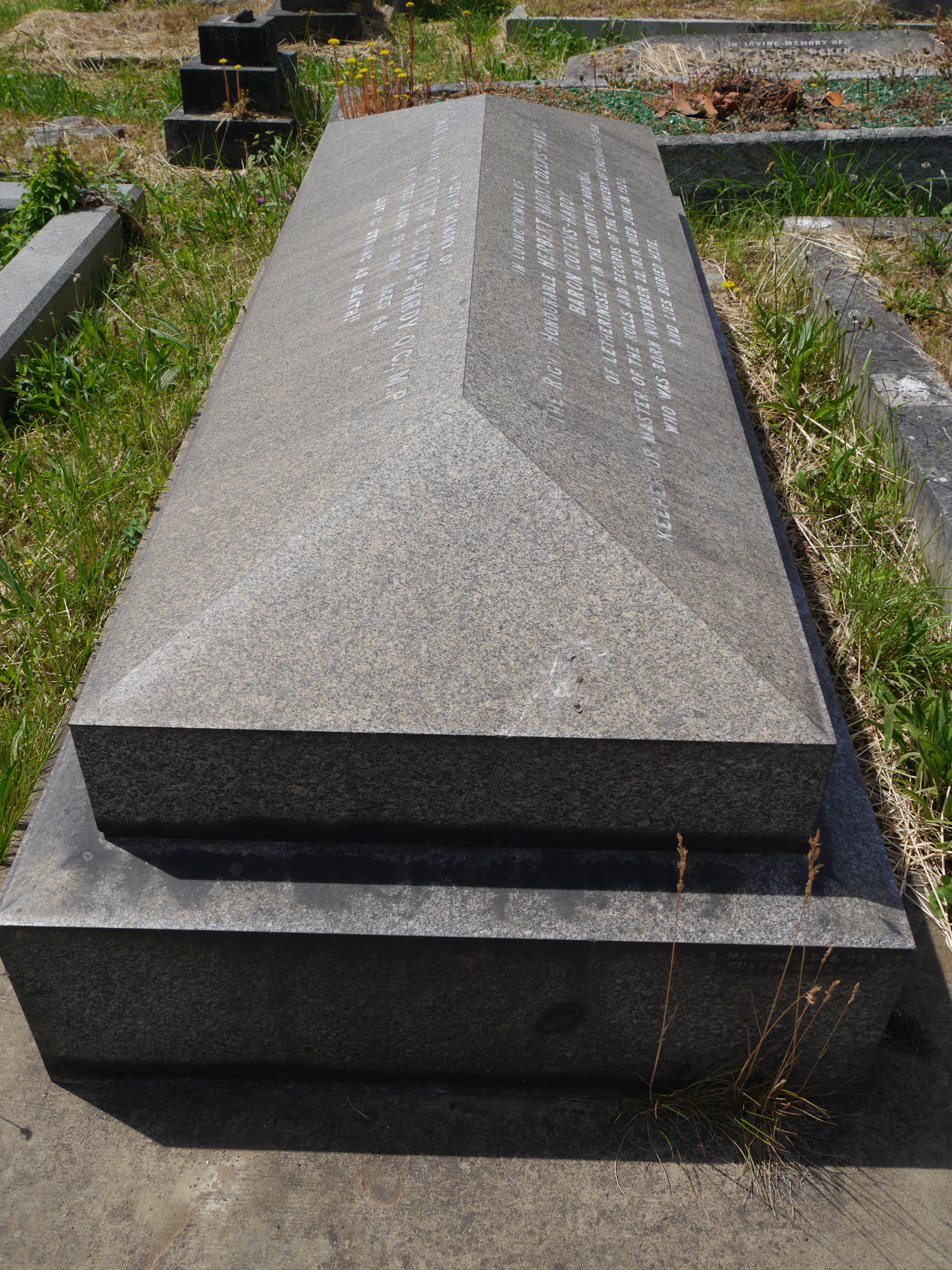
Pyramidal or "hipped" grey granite grave monument on a larger stone base, Kensal Green Cemetery

Herbert Hardy Cozens-Hardy, (Note: /kʌzənz.hɑːrdiː/) 1st Baron Cozens-Hardy, PC (1838–1920) was a British politician and judge who served as Master of the Rolls from 1907 until 1918.

== Early life and career ==
Cozens-Hardy was born in Letheringsett, Norfolk, in 1838, the second son of William Hardy Cozens-Hardy, a former Norwich solicitor, and Sarah, née Theobald, daughter of Thomas Theobald, textile manufacturer. His grandmother was the diarist Mary Hardy. His family were Methodists, a connection which proved to be useful in his career at the bar.

Cozens-Hardy was educated at Amersham School and University College, London, where he matriculated in 1858 and gained the LLB in 1863, later becoming a fellow of University College. He was called to the bar at Lincoln's Inn in 1862, and read in the chambers of Thomas Lewin and James Dickinson.

Cozens-Hardy acquired a large junior practice at the Chancery bar, and became Queen's Counsel in 1882. It was then the practice of Chancery Queen's Counsels to attach themselves to the court of a particular Chancery Division judge: Cozens-Hardy initially attached himself to the court of Mr Justice Fry; upon the latter's promotion to the Court of Appeal in 1883 he attached himself to Mr Justice North. In 1893 he became a 'special', a Chancery silk unattached to any particular judge, but who charged a special fee of £50 (equivalent to £6,000 in 2025) per appearance. Popular among his peers, he was elected chairman of the General Council of the Bar and served until his elevation to the bench 1899.

== Political career ==
In 1885, Cozens-Hardy was returned as the Liberal Member of Parliament for North Norfolk, keeping the seat until 1899. He frequently spoke on legal matters, although he was never a prominent figure. His most important achievement was the Law of Property Amendment Act 1860 subduing the law of mortmain into only the modern rule against perpetuities. This enabled charities and schools to be set up with less bureaucracy to avoid them being declared void. It is nicknamed the Cozens-Hardy Act. He remained with Gladstone when the Liberal Party split over Irish Home Rule in 1886, although he wavered towards the defectors for a time.

== Legal career ==
In 1899, the elevation of Sir Robert Romer to the Court of Appeal on the death of Lord Justice Chitty created a vacancy in the Chancery Division. Though Lord Halsbury, the Lord Chancellor, was known to biased toward Conservatives in judicial appointments, he nevertheless recommended Cozens-Hardy for the vacancy, writing to him that "Notwithstanding your abominable politics I think you are the fittest person to succeed Romer". Cozens-Hardy was duly appointed to the High Court and assigned to the Chancery Division, receiving the customary knighthood in the 1899 Birthday Honours. In 1901, he succeeded Lord Justice Rigby as a Lord Justice of Appeal and was sworn of the Privy Council.

In 1907 Cozens-Hardy succeeded Sir Richard Henn Collins as Master of the Rolls. He was created Baron Cozens-Hardy, of Letheringsett, in the County of Norfolk, on 1 July 1914. Retiring in 1918, he died less than two years later in 1920, aged 81, and was buried in Kensal Green Cemetery. His eldest son, the Hon William Cozens-Hardy KC MP, succeeded to the barony.

Notable judicial decisions of Cozens-Hardy included:

- British South Africa Company v De Beers Consolidated Mines Ltd [1910] 2 Ch 502

== Family ==
In 1868, he married Maria Hepburn, who bore him two sons and two daughters before her death in 1886; the spouse's shared tombstone gives to her its sole epigraph: "Love is as strong as death". His town house was 50 Ladbroke Grove, Kensington, London.

Via his elder daughter, Katharine, who married Silvester Horne, he was the maternal grandfather of Kenneth Horne. His younger daughter, Hope, married Austin Pilkington of that glass and crystal making family, and was mother of Harry Pilkington.

== Arms ==
Coat of arms of Herbert Cozens-Hardy, 1st Baron Cozens-Hardy
Crest 1st a dexter arm embowed holding in the hand an eagle's head erased fesswise Proper (Hardy); 2nd a lion rampant Or vulned at the shoulder Proper and gorged with a ducal coronet Azure. Escutcheon Quarterly: 1st & 4th per chevron Argent and Or in chief two fire balls Sable fired Proper (Hardy); 2nd & 3rd Azure a lion rampant Or gorged with a ducal coronet of the field in chief two barrulets of the second (Cozens). Supporters Dexter an eagle Argent wings endorsed Gules holding in the beak a white rose slipped and leaved Proper, sinister a winged lion queue fourchée Argent wings endorsed Gules. Motto Fear One. Badge Upon a field Azure diaper of mascles and fleurs-de-lis Or an estoc (or thrusting sword) the blade enfiled with a baron's coronet Proper the quillons terminating in fleurs-de-lis Or the hilt also Proper and the pomel Or thereon a rose Argent, with mottoes "Fear One" and "Je Sers".

== Footnotes and references ==
=== Citations ===
Parliament of the United Kingdom
Preceded by Edward Birkbeck; Sir Edmund Lacon	Member of Parliament for North Norfolk; 1885–1899	Succeeded by William Brampton Gurdon
Legal offices
Preceded by Richard Collins	Master of the Rolls; 1907–1918	Succeeded by Sir Charles Swinfen Eady
Peerage of the United Kingdom
New creation	Baron Cozens-Hardy; 1914–1920	Succeeded by William Hepburn Cozens-Hardy
