= Richard Pilkington (Newton MP) =

British politician

Colonel Richard Pilkington CB
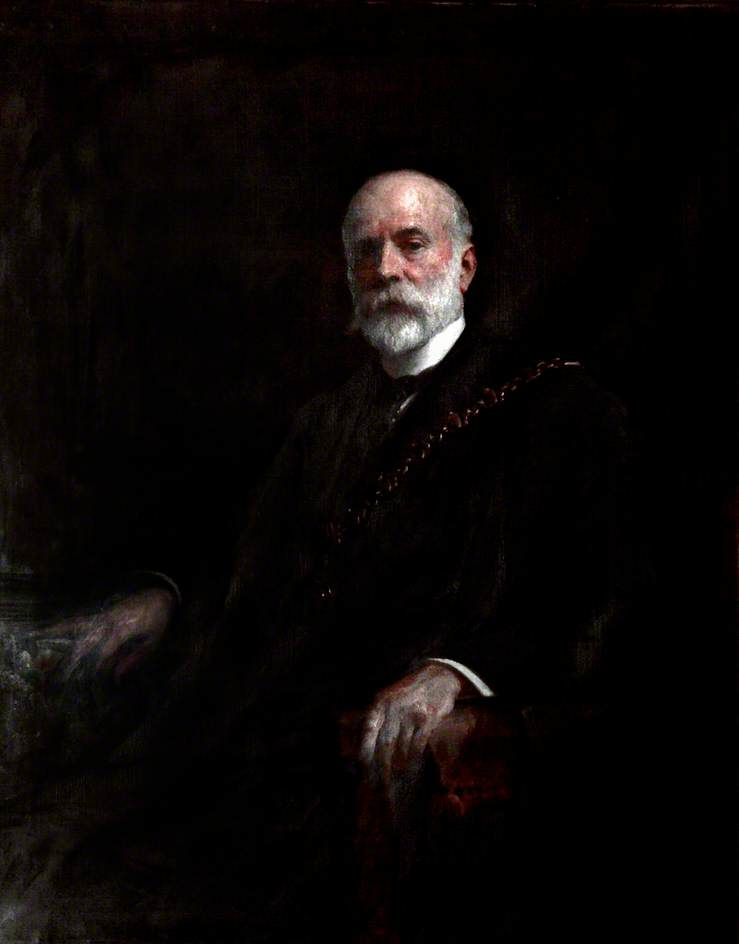

Member of Parliament for Newton
- In office 16 January 1899 – 7 February 1906
- Preceded by: Thomas Wodehouse Legh
- Succeeded by: James Andrew Seddon

Personal details
- Born: 17 January 1841 St Helens, Lancashire
- Died: 12 March 1908 (aged 67)
- Party: Conservative
- Spouse: Louisa Sinclair
- Relatives: Charles Pilkington (brother) Richard Evans (1778–1864) (grandfather)

Richard Pilkington (17 January 1841 – 12 March 1908) was a British Conservative politician and member of the Pilkington glass-manufacturing family.

He was the second son of Richard Pilkington of Windle Hall near St Helens, Lancashire. In 1858/59 he became a partner in the family glassworks.

In 1863 he married Louisa Sinclair and in 1885 he bought the Rainford Hall estate, commissioning James Medland Taylor to build a new house. The building is in the Jacobethan style, of red brick with sandstone dressings.

He became a member of St Helens Borough Council, holding the office of mayor in 1881, 1896, 1897 and 1898. By this time he held the rank of lieutenant-colonel, in the Volunteer Force and commanded a battalion of the South Lancashire Regiment.

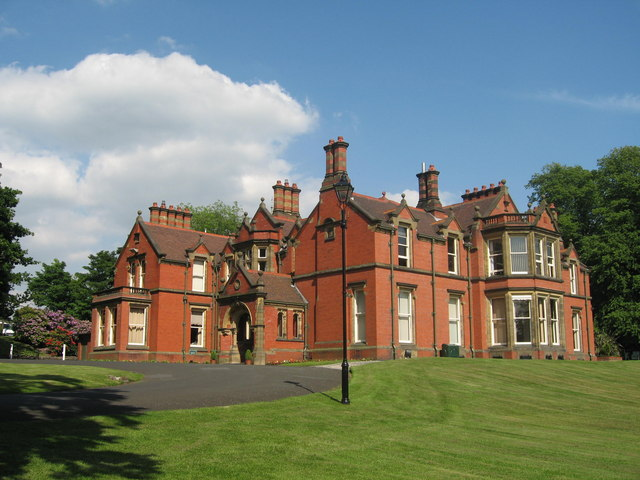
Richard Pilkington commissioned James Medland Taylor to build a new house on his Rainford Hall estate.

In December 1898 he was selected as the Conservative candidate for a by-election in the Newton constituency. He had previously been considered a Liberal Unionist. As the only candidate nominated he was elected unopposed on 16 January 1899.

Pilkington held his seat at the subsequent general election in 1900, but was defeated in 1906 by a Labour candidate.

Richard Pilkington died on 12 March 1908, aged 67. A condition in his will forbade the inheritors of his estate from permitting the construction or use of any building for the sale of intoxicating liquor.

Parliament of the United Kingdom
Preceded by Thomas Wodehouse Legh	Member of Parliament for Newton; 1899–1906	Succeeded by James Andrew Seddon
