= Alison Duke (classicist) =

British classical scholar (1915–2005)

- Duke in 1998
- Born: 22 July 1915; Cambridge, Cambridgeshire, England
- Died: 6 November 2005 (aged 90)

Academic background
- Education: Perse School for Girls; Girton College, Cambridge

Academic work
- Discipline: Classicist
- Sub-discipline: Latin language; Ancient Greek language; palaeography
- Institutions: University of Reading; Girton College, Cambridge; Faculty of Classics, University of Cambridge

Alison Duke (22 July 1915 – 6 November 2005) was a British classicist, academic, and Girl Guide leader.

== Early life and education ==
Duke was born on 22 July 1915 in Cambridge, England. Her parents were William Holden Duke, an English classical scholar and fellow of Jesus College, Cambridge, and Emilie Johanna von Lippe from near Dresden in Saxony. Her maternal grandfather, Robert von Lippe, managed a farm estate at Helfenberg as a tenant of the Saxon royal family. Alison's parents married in Frauenkirche, Dresden in January 1913 and subsequently moved to Cambridge.

Duke was educated at the Perse School for Girls, a private school in Cambridge. She was enrolled into 1st Cambridge Company, Girl Guides Association, at the age of 11. From 1934 to 1938, she studied classics at Girton College, Cambridge. Having achieved first class honours in Part II of the Classical Tripos, she graduated with a Bachelor of Arts (BA) degree in 1938. She was awarded the Charles Oldham Classical Scholarship in 1938, and so remained on at Cambridge to undertake research on the manuscripts of Books 31-40 of Livy's History of Rome.

== Career ==
In 1940, Duke became a lecturer at the University of Reading. During WWII, she contributed to the war effort via her work with the Girl Guides. She was posted to Greece with the Guide International Service between 1944 and 1946. During this time, she worked at Greek refugee camps in Egypt, ensured that relief supplies reached a women's prison in Athens, and accepted the arms surrendered by ELAS guerrillas in Amphissa. After the war she was instrumental in rebuilding the Guide movement in both Germany and Greece, and in Britain she served on the national education panel at Girl Guides' headquarters.

In 1946, Duke returned to her alma mater, Girton College, Cambridge, where she had been appointed an assistant tutor. She would remain at Girton until she retired. In 1951, she was promoted to tutor and succeeded Norah Christina Jolliffe as director of studies in classics. She officially became the college's first senior tutor in 1968, holding the post until 1974. She additionally taught palaeography within the Faculty of Classics, University of Cambridge, where she was an assistant lecturer from 1952 and then a lecturer from 1957. In 1982, she retired from full-time academia and was made a life fellow by Girton.

== Personal life ==
Duke died on 6 November 2005, aged 90. Her funeral service was held on 21 November in the chapel of Girton College.
