= 1909 Crystal Palace Scout Rally =

Historic Scout gathering in London in 1909

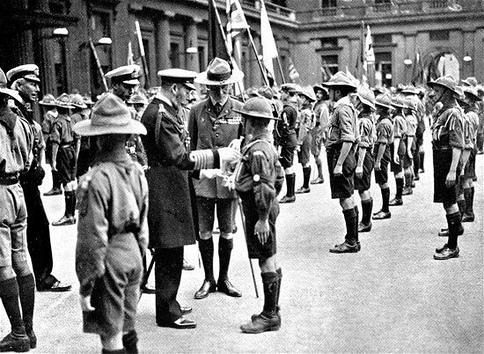
1909 Crystal Palace Scout Rally

The Crystal Palace Rally was a gathering of Boy Scouts and Girl Scouts at the Crystal Palace in London on Saturday, 4 September 1909. The rally demonstrated the rapid popularisation of the Scout Movement with an estimated 11,000 boys attending with the prominent presence of Girl Scouts also being significant for the start of Girl Scouts and Girl Guides. The rally was held a year and a half after the publication of Scouting for Boys and The Scout magazine, and two years after Robert Baden-Powell's demonstration Brownsea Island Scout Camp.

Some controversy occurred with attempts to exclude Scouts from the British Boy Scouts, Church Scout Patrols and other scouts not registered with Baden-Powell's Boy Scouts organisation leading to challenges regarding the 4th Scout Law that "A Scout is ... a brother to every other scout".

The Scouts' Own, a simple, non-denominational religious ceremony, was introduced at this rally by H. Geoffrey Elwes.

Members of the local Scout Troop, 2nd Croydon (1st Crystal Palace Patrol), formed part of the flag party for Princess Christian, a member of the royal family in attendance. The Group still meet near Crystal Palace Park and regularly use Crystal Palace Park for Scout activities.

== Girls ==
By the time the Rally was held, over six thousand girls had registered with the Boy Scout Association. Several hundred of these attended, including one group under their Patrol Leader Marguerite de Beaumont. They dressed in the Girl Scout uniform as given in the Scout handbook. They called themselves Girl Scouts, and were referred to as that by the media and others. Girls had been part of the Scout Movement almost as soon as it began. A contingent of girls from Peckham Rye spoke to Baden-Powell at the Rally.

The media coverage of the rally, including that in The Spectator magazine in October–December 1909 initiated by Miss Violet Markham, led to the founding, in 1910, of the Girl Guides organisation under Baden-Powell's sister, Agnes Baden-Powell that further led to other Girl Guide and Girl Scout organisations around the world. Baden-Powell decided to create an entirely separate organisation for girls, the Girl Guides and excluded girls from his Scout organisation. In those days, it was not common for girls to camp and hike, as this extract from the Scout newspaper shows: "If a girl is not allowed to run, or even hurry, to swim, ride a bike, or raise her arms above her head, how can she become a Scout?".

Attendees who later influenced the Scouts and Guides included Nesta G. Ashworth née Maude, later instrumental in the setup of Lone Guides, Rotha Lintorn-Orman and Nella Levy, a pioneer of Guiding in Australia.

To commemorate the event, in September 2009, Girlguiding UK opened a Centenary Maze in Crystal Palace Park.

== See also ==
- Guiding 2010 Centenary
