= Nesta Maude Ashworth =

British scouting pioneer (1893–1982)

- Born: 9 October 1893
- Died: 13 July 1982 (aged 88)
- Known for: Early Scouting notable

Nesta Gervaise Ashworth (née Maude; 9 October 1893 – 13 July 1982), was an early Scouting notable, instrumental in the setting up of Lone Guides, members of the Guides who are in isolated areas or otherwise do not participate in a regular Scouting unit or organisation. 1st Lone Company was established in 1912 by Agnes Baden-Powell, with Nesta Maude serving as captain.

== Life ==
Nesta Maude, with Rotha Lintorn-Orman, was one of the girls who showed up at the 1909 Crystal Palace Scout Rally wanting to be Scouts, which led to the foundation of the Girl Guides. The Crystal Palace was an enormous exhibition facility and stadium in London, and housed the first large gathering of Scouts, the forerunner to all later jamborees, in September 1909. The Rally included displays, contests, a march-by of all the Scouts, and an inspection of the troops by the Chief Scout. At the end of the march-by, the last Scout patrol in a group of 11,000 consisted of nine girls, wearing Stetsons and carrying staves. B-P approached the girls and asked who they were. "We're the Girl Scouts," to which he replied "You can't be; there aren't any Girl Scouts." 16 year old Nesta retorted swiftly "Oh, yes there are, 'cos we're them!" This was the Wolf Patrol, under patrol leader Marguerite de Beaumont, and her younger sister Elizabeth. In 1908 they had registered as a Scout troop, using their initials rather than forenames. Also at the Rally were a group of girls calling themselves Pinkney's Green Scouts, and two representatives from the Girls' Emergency Corps. These three small groups of girls at the Crystal Palace Rally are often cited as the origin of the Girl Guide movement.

In 1911 she was awarded one of the first of the Girl Guides' Silver Fish Awards, the very first Guide to earn the award. She was awarded the Silver Fish twice, the second time in 1920.

She married Norman Bradshaw Ashworth in 1920 at St Jude's Church, Hampstead Garden Suburb. He was awarded the OBE in the 1952 Birthday Honours. In 1951 she emigrated to British Columbia. Her autobiography, edited by her daughters, Mary Ashworth and Margaret Spencer, was published in 2015.

== Bibliography ==
- Ashworth, Nesta Maude (2015). A Guiding Life: An Autobiography. Nesta Maude Ashworth, Silver Fish. Victoria, BC, Canada: FriesenPress. ISBN 978-1-4602-7330-2.
