= Guiding 2010 Centenary =

- Country: worldwide
- Website http://www.wagggsworld.org/en/about/100years

The Guiding 2010 Centenary consisted of celebrations around the world in which Girl Guides and Girl Scouts celebrated 100 years of the world Guide and Scout movement. It took place over three years, 2010-2012, reflecting the founding dates of many World Association of Girl Guides and Girl Scouts member organisations.

National Guide and Scout movements added local celebrations to the international ones.

== Centenary Celebration Days ==
There were three Centenary Celebration Days. On 10 April each year, celebrations were held around the world under a unifying theme. The theme for 2010 was plant. The theme for 2011 was grow, and the theme for 2012 was share.

== Girlguiding UK ==
Girlguiding UK started its Centenary celebrations on 4 September 2009. The Centenary Camp was held from 2010-07-31 to 2010-08-07 at Harewood House. In September 2009, a maze to celebrate the beginnings of Guiding at Crystal Palace opened in Crystal Palace Park.

The tall ship Lord Nelson made a 100-day voyage around the coast of the UK to celebrate the centenary. The Lord Nelson set sail from Glasgow on 7 June 2010. She called at Oban, Aberdeen, Newcastle, Boston, London, Chatham, Portsmouth, Falmouth, Milford Haven and Whitehaven. At each port she took on new crew, many of whom had never sailed before.

== Girl Guides Australia ==
Girl Guides Australia celebrated 100 years of Guiding across Australia from September 2009 to February 2011.

The Australian Centenary Event (ACE) was held 3–9 January 2010 just outside Melbourne, Victoria. It was an international camp for 2500 girls, with another 500-700 leaders attending. Pippa Penguin was the mascot for ACE. ACE was to be held at Britannia Park, but was moved after high risk of bushfire.

Other nationwide Centenary events included simultaneous 100 Downunder activities on 23 May and Promise renewals on 10-10-10 at 10am.

The Australian Government named 2010 the 'Year of the Girl Guide' in honour of the centenary celebrations. They also issued a commemorative $1 coin into circulation as well as 3 postage stamps to celebrate the event.

The Chain of Campfires event was held on 19 June. Units across Australia lit campfires between 5pm and 9pm.

== Girl Guides of Canada ==
Guiding Mosaic 2010 was held from 8–17 July at Guelph Lake Conservation Area in Southern Ontario. Over 2,500 girls and women attended the camp. Participants came from across Canada as well as from many countries, including Australia, Bangladesh, Jamaica, Japan, New Zealand and the United States.

== Girl Scouts of Korea ==

The Girl Scouts of Korea (GSK) hosted the 13th Girl Scout International Camp in commemoration of the Centenary of Girl Guiding and Girl Scouting, from 25 to 31 July 2011 at Goseong World Jamboree campsite, Gangwon, Korea.

== Girl Scouts of the USA 2012 Centennial ==
GSUSA is in contact with museums, businesses and organizations to join with the Girl Scouts in showcasing Girl Scouts.

The celebration of the Anniversary will be kicked off by participating in the Pasadena, California Rose Parade of 2012, featuring the GSUSA 100th Anniversary float.

Colorado is staging a vigorous campaign to create a special license plate to honor the Girl Scout Centennial. The campaign has gone national with the Girl Scouts asking for votes at their website.

== Girl Guides of Malaysia ==
Throughout 2016, the national association and its branches have held several events to celebrate 100 years of girl guiding since 1917.

== Postage stamps ==
Many countries have issued postage stamps honouring the Guiding and Girl Scouting's centenary. These include:

- Jersey on 12 January 2010
- United Kingdom on 2 February 2010
- Guernsey on 27 May 2010
- Canada on 8 July 2010
- Australia on 31 August 2010
- USA on 9 June 2012
- Malaysia on 9 December 2016

== Coins ==
Many countries have issued coins honouring the Guiding and Girl Scouting's centenary. These include:

- United Kingdom on 8 February 2010
- Australia in June 2010
- Malaysia on 6 June 2016

== See also ==
- Scouting 2007 Centenary
