= Dorothy Grace Waring =

English fascist campaigner and author (1891–1977)

- Born: 8 June 1891; Plumstead, London, England
- Died: 25 April 1977 (aged 85); Kilkeel, Northern Ireland
- Occupations: fascist campaigner and novelist
- Known for: 12 novels as D. Gainsborough Waring
- Movement: British Fascism
- Spouse: Edward St Clair Harnett (m. 1916, divorced)
- Children: 1

Dorothy Grace Waring (8 June 1891 – 25 April 1977) was an English fascist campaigner in Northern Ireland and England and under the pseudonym D. Gainsborough Waring, the author of 12 novels from 1936 onwards.

== Early life ==
She was born on 8 June 1891 at Hill Top, Shrewsbury Lane, Plumstead, London, the only child of Colonel Henry Waring (c.1863–1940), a Royal Artillery officer and later a farmer, and his wife, Florence Atthill Waring (died 1959). She was educated at military schools in Malta and Gibraltar.

== Career ==
During the Irish War of Independence, her father was an Ulster Special Constabulary (USC or "B-Specials") commander, and they lived at Lisnacree House near Kilkeel, County Down, which doubled as a USC post. In September 1920, Lisnacree House was raided by the Irish Republican Army (IRA), looking for guns, and they were held hostage for some hours. Afterwards there was a gunfight, but no one was killed.

From 1922, complaints were received about Waring's alleged over-zealous strip searching of women suspected of carrying weapons or messages on behalf of the IRA. She was defended by Northern Ireland's minister of home affairs, but as a result of concern that her actions might lead to local rioting, she was dismissed in March 1923.

In the late 1920s, she joined the British Fascists (BF), was a close friend of the founder, Rotha Lintorn-Orman, and became a senior party member. In May 1932, she became the editor of the party newspaper, and became the propaganda officer. After the winding up of the BF she joined the pro-German The Link.

In 1936, as D. Gainsborough Waring she published her first novel, Nothing Irredeemable, and 11 more would follow. Much of her work was set in a "barely fictionalized south Down", involved the gentry, British intelligence officers, and the occult.

== Personal life ==
On 15 April 1916, Waring married the army officer and barrister Edward St Clair Harnett (1881–1964). They had one son, Denis Henry Waring (1917–1964). The marriage ended after some years, and her ex-husband remarried in 1927.

== Later life ==
In 1972, her home, Lisnacree House, was destroyed by arsonists. She died on 25 April 1977 at Mourne Hospital, Kilkeel.

== Selected publications ==
- Nothing Irredeemable (John Long, London, 1936)
- Fortune Must Follow (John Long, London, 1937)
- Out of Evil (Cahill & Co, Dublin, 1937)
- The Oldest Road (John Long, London,1938)
- This New Corn (1940)
- And If I Laugh (1940)
- Against My Fire (John Long, London, 1941)
- Hatred Therewith (1942)
- Deep Malice (1944)
- Not Quite So Black (1948)
