= Walking stick =

Stick used to assist with walking

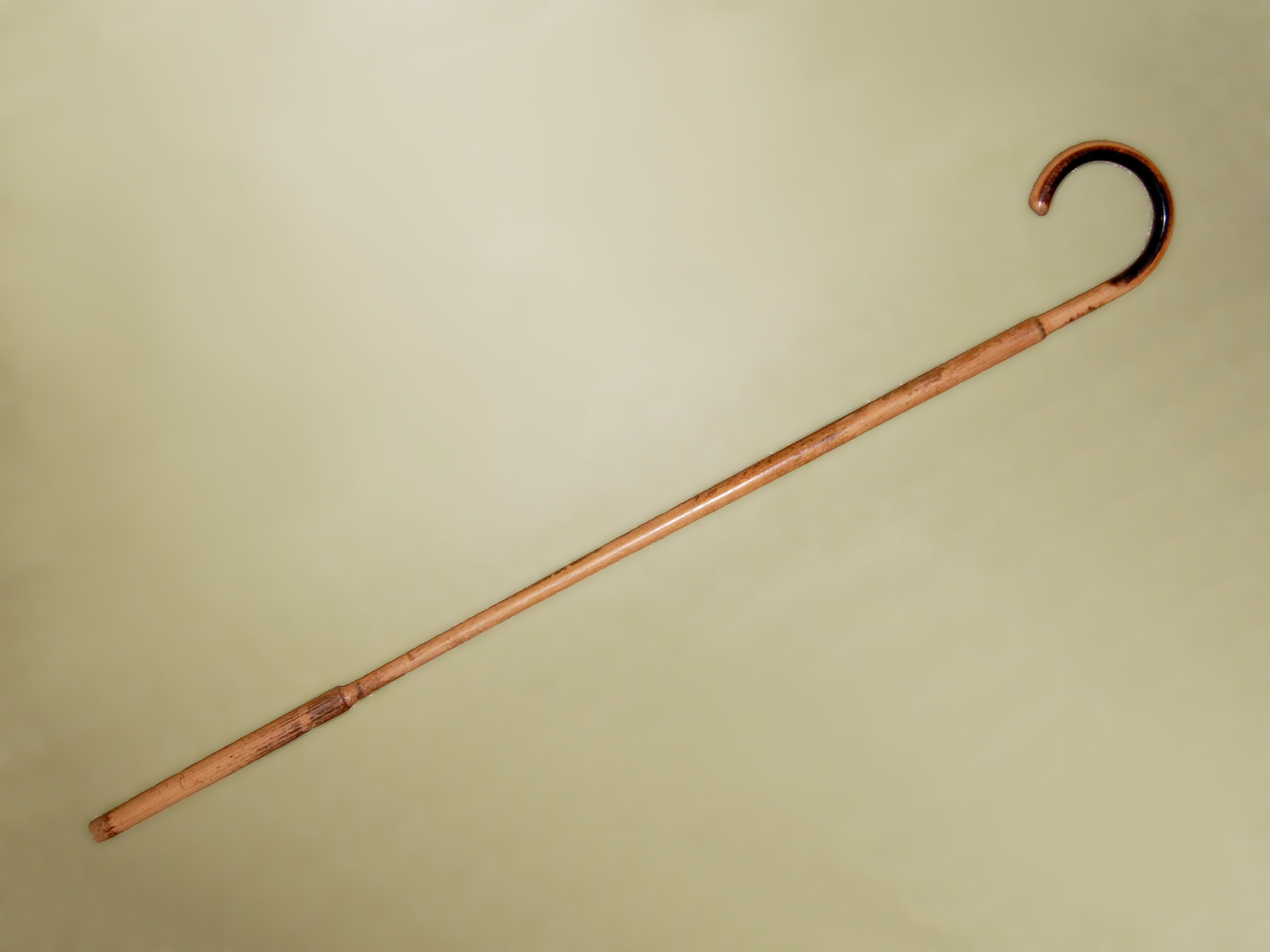
A walking stick

A walking stick (also known as a walking cane, cane, walking staff, or staff) is a device used primarily to aid walking, provide postural stability or support, or assist in maintaining a good posture. Some designs also serve as a fashion accessory, or are used for self-defense.

Walking sticks come in many shapes and sizes and some have become collector's items. People with disabilities may use some kinds of walking sticks as a crutch, but a walking cane is not designed for full weight support but used to help with balance. The walking stick has also historically been known to be used as a self-defense weapon, and may conceal a sword or knife.

Hikers use walking sticks, also known as trekking poles, pilgrim's staffs, hiking poles, or hiking sticks, for a wide variety of purposes: as a support when going uphill or as a brake when going downhill; as a balance point when crossing streams, swamps, or other rough terrain; to feel for obstacles in the path; to test mud and water for depth; to enhance the cadence of striding, and as a defence against animals. An alpenstock, from its origins in mountaineering in the Alps, is equipped with a steel point and may carry a hook or ice axe on top. More ornate sticks may be adorned with small trinkets or medallions depicting visited territory. Wooden walking-sticks are used for outdoor sports, healthy upper-body exercise, and even club, department, and family memorials. They can be individually handcrafted from a number of woods and may be personalised with wood carving or metal engraving plaques.

A collector of walking sticks is termed a rabologist.

== Origin ==
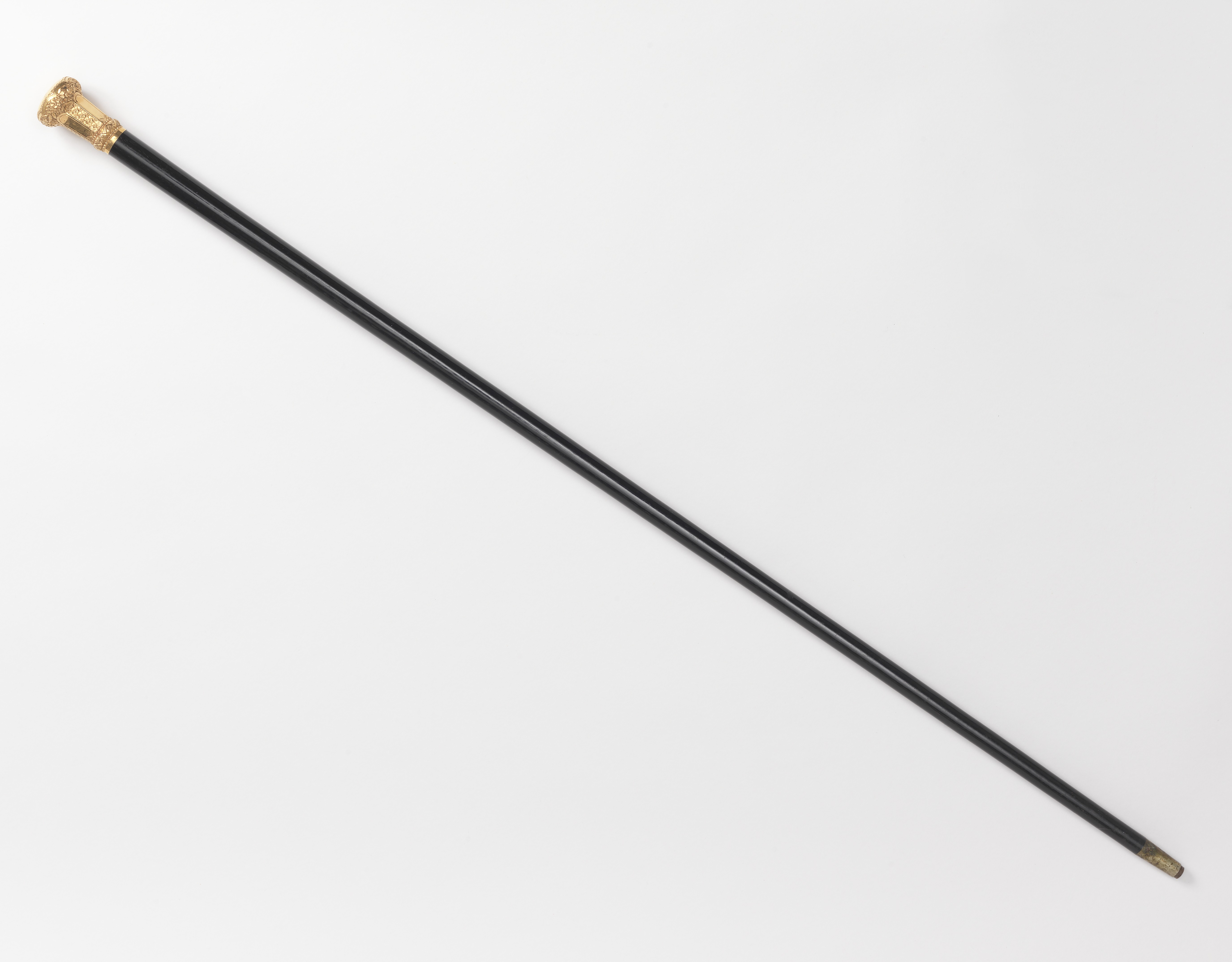
A classic late 19th century walking cane, sometimes also called a dress cane

Around the 17th or 18th century, a walking stick became an essential part of the European gentleman's wardrobe. The fashion may have originated with Louis XIV, who favored a walking stick, possibly because he wore high heels. A curator of the Detroit Institute of Arts wrote about elaborate walking sticks in their collection:

There was almost no limit to the sums which people were then willing to spend upon them. Louis XIV had a stick whose eagle knob was set with twenty-four diamonds. The Regent of France, one of the outstanding rakes of the century, had a huge and famous diamond called "the Regent" set as the head of a walking stick. Voltaire, who considered that he lived a life free from fashionable nonsense, owned eighty sticks. Rousseau, a poor man and the apostle of the simple life, owned forty. Count Brühl, creator of the famous Brühl Terrace at Dresden, owned three hundred canes, each with a snuff-box to match, one for each of his three hundred suits.

The fashion spread across the Atlantic to America. Benjamin Franklin had received as a gift a gold-headed walking stick from a French lady admirer when he was ambassador to France. Franklin wrote a codicil to his Will in 1789 bequeathing it to George Washington. It is now in the collection of the Smithsonian Institution.

== Length and user weight ==
For use as a walking aid, it is usually recommended that the length of the stick should be such that the top of the handle reaches the wrist joint when standing up with arms hanging, wearing the footwear to be used with the stick.

Sticks are rated according to the weight they can bear; this is not just a matter of the weight of the user, but depends upon whether the stick is used for light balance and support, or with a great deal of weight placed on the stick. Canes made of carbon fiber or aluminum are stronger than those of the same weight and made of other materials such as hardwood.

== Accessories ==
- The most common accessory, before or after purchase or manufacture, is a hand strap, to prevent loss of the stick should the hand release its grip. These are often threaded through a hole drilled into the stick rather than tied around.
- A clip-on frame or similar device can be used to stand a stick against the top of a table.
- In cold climates, a metallic cleat may be added to the foot of the cane. This dramatically increases traction on ice. The device is usually designed so it can be easily flipped to the side to prevent damage to indoor flooring.
- Different handles are available to match grips of varying sizes.
- Rubber ferrules give extra traction on most surfaces.
- Nordic walking poles are extremely popular in Europe. Walking with two poles in the correct length radically reduces the stress to the knees, hips and back. These special poles come with straps resembling a fingerless glove, durable metal tips for off-road and removable rubber tips for pavement and other hard surfaces.

== Religious and ceremonial use ==
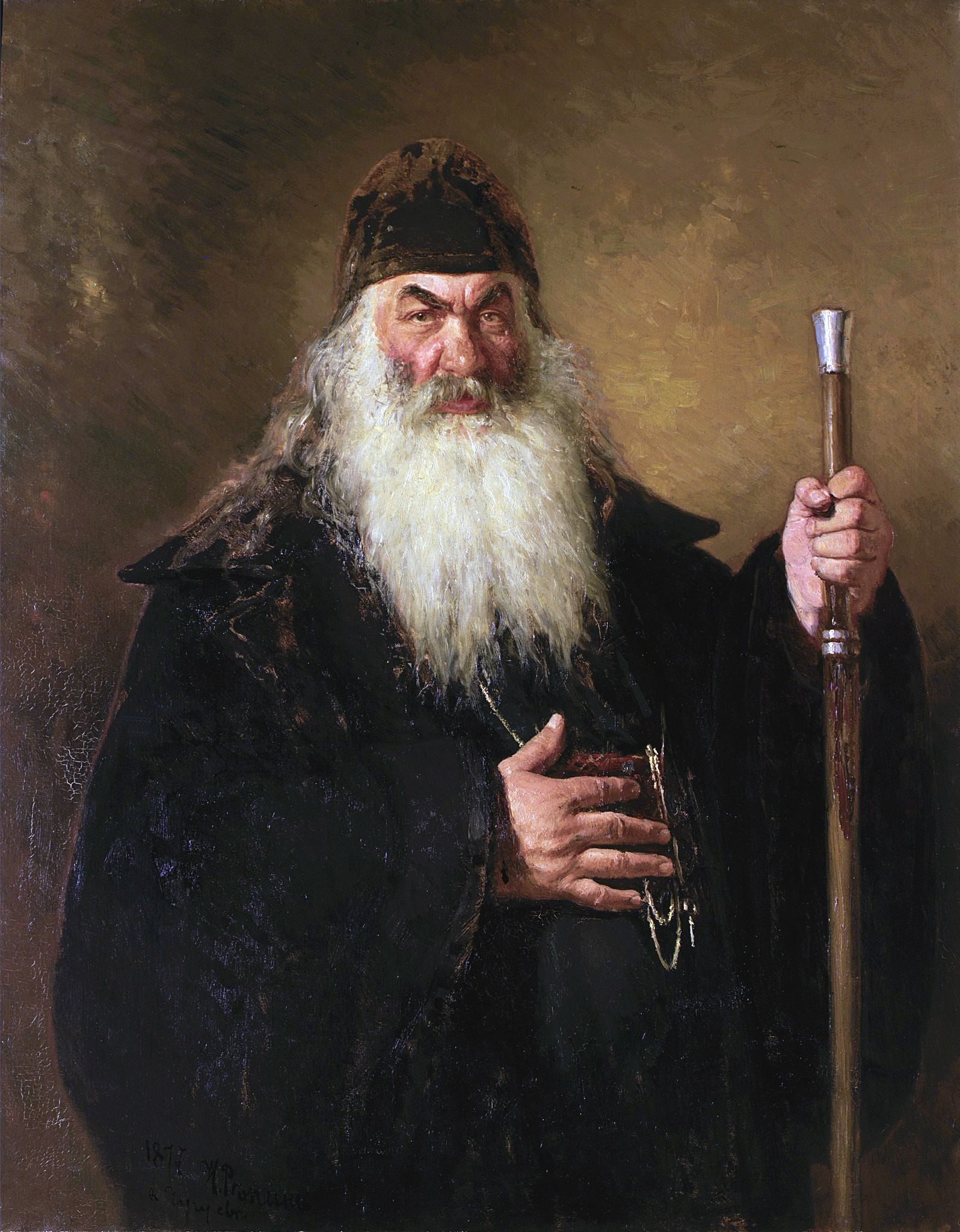
Orthodox protodeacon holding a walking stick. Portrait by Ilya Repin, 1877 (Tretyakov Gallery, Moscow).

Various staffs of office derived from walking sticks or staffs are used by both western and eastern Christian churches, and for ceremonial purposes, as by Black Rod, the Tipstaff, Gold Stick and Silver Stick.

== Types ==
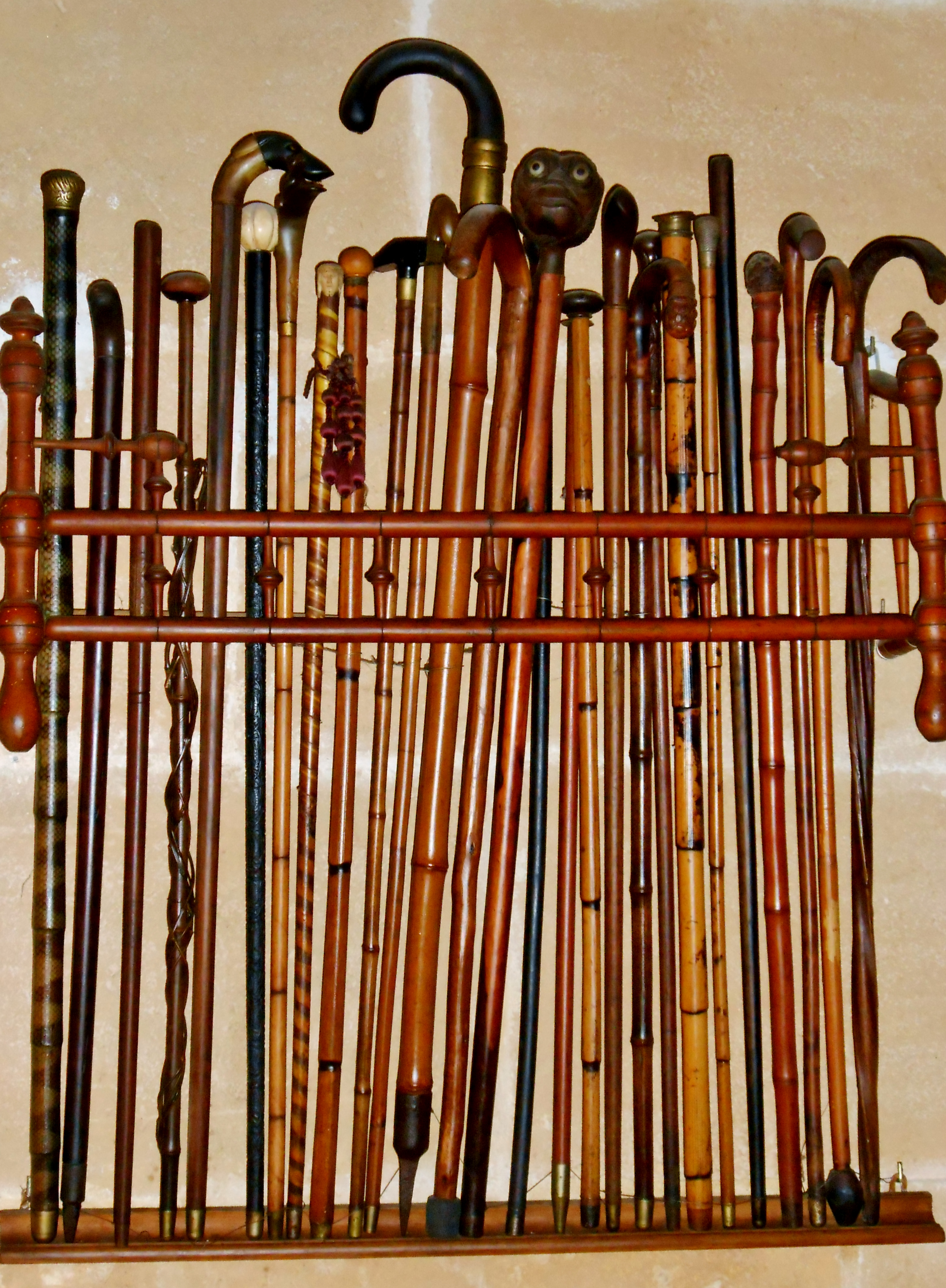
A collection of various styles of walking sticks on display at the ethnology museum Els Calderers rural manor, Sant Joan, Mallorca

=== Ashplant ===
A British or Irish walking stick made from the ash tree. In the Royal Tank Regiment, officers carry an ashplant walking stick in reference to World War I when they were used to test the ground's firmness and suitability for tanks.

=== Blackthorn ===
An Irish walking stick, or shillelagh, usable as a weapon, made from the blackthorn (Prunus spinosa).

=== Shooting stick ===
It can fold out into a single-legged seat.

=== Supplejack ===
Made from a tropical American vine, also serves as a cane.

=== Penang lawyer ===
Made from Licuala. After the bark was removed with only a piece of glass, the stick was straightened by fire and polished. The fictional Dr. Mortimer owned one of these in The Hound of the Baskervilles. So did Fitzroy Simpson, the main suspect in "The Adventure of Silver Blaze" (1892), whose lead weighted stick was initially assumed to be the murder weapon.

=== Makila (or makhila) ===
Basque walking stick or staff, usually made from medlar wood. It often features a gold or silver foot and handle, which may conceal a steel blade. The Makila's elaborate engravings are actually carved into the living wood, then allowed to heal before harvesting.

=== Kebbie ===
A rough Scottish walking stick, similar to an Irish shillelagh, with a hooked head.

=== Whangee ===
Asian, made of bamboo, also a riding crop. Such a stick was owned by Charlie Chaplin's character The Tramp.

=== Malacca ===
Malay stick made of rattan palms.

=== Pike staff ===
Pointed at the end for slippery surfaces.

=== Scout staff ===
Tall stick traditionally carried by Boy Scouts, which has a number of uses

=== Waddy ===
Australian Aboriginal walking stick or war club, about one metre in length, sometimes with a stone head affixed with string and beeswax.

=== Ziegenhainer ===
Knotty German stick, made from European cornel, also used as a melee weapon by a duellist's second. The spiral groove caused by a parasitic vine was often imitated by its maker if not present.

== American walking canes ==
In North America, a walking cane is a walking stick curved down at the top, not usually actually made of cane but of materials including wood, metal or carbon fiber.

In modern times, walking sticks are usually only seen with formal attire. Retractable canes that reveal such properties as hidden compartments, pool sticks, or blades are popular among collectors. Handles have been made from many substances, both natural and manmade. Carved and decorated canes have turned the functional into the fantastic.

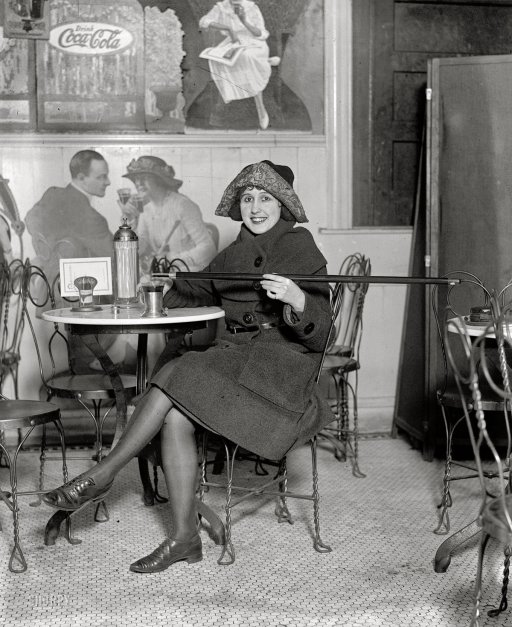
A woman in a soda fountain pouring liquor hidden in a walking stick into her drink during Prohibition in the United States, c. 1922.

The idea of a fancy cane as a fashion accessory to go with top hat and tails has been popularized in many song-and-dance acts, especially by Fred Astaire in several of his films and songs such as Top Hat, White Tie and Tails and Puttin' On the Ritz, where he exhorts, "Come, let's mix where Rockefellers walk with sticks or umbrellas in their mitts." He danced with a cane frequently.

Some canes, known as "tippling canes" or "tipplers", have hollowed-out compartments near the top where flasks or vials of an alcoholic beverage can be hidden and sprung out on demand.

When used as a mobility or stability aid, canes are generally used in the hand opposite the injury or weakness, allowing the user to shift much of their weight onto the cane and away from the user's weaker side as they walk. Due to personal preference or a need to use the dominant hand, some cane users hold the cane on their injured side.

In the U.S. Congress in 1856, Charles Sumner of Massachusetts criticized Stephen A. Douglas of Illinois and Andrew Butler of South Carolina for the Kansas–Nebraska Act. When a relative of Andrew Butler, Preston Brooks, heard of it, he felt that Sumner's behavior demanded retaliation and beat him senseless on the floor of the Senate with a gutta-percha walking cane. Although this event is commonly known as "the caning of Senator Charles Sumner", it was not a caning in the normal (especially British) sense of formal corporal punishment, which involves a much more flexible and usually thinner rattan.

== See also ==
- Cane gun
- Canne de combat
- Pace stick
- Swordstick
- Shillelagh
