= Nella Levy =

Nella E Levy (Mrs Merivale)
- Born: 1898; Newtown, Sydney, Australia.
- Died: Australia
- Other names: Mrs Merivale
- Occupations: Trainer, First Division Commissioner for Waverley, Girl Guides Association of New South Wales
- Known for: Attending Crystal Palace Scout Rally in 1909 as a Girl Scout Patrol Leader. Starting Girl Guides in New South Wales.

Nella Levy, nicknamed "The Lev" was a pioneer of Girl Guiding in Australia. She was the first Division Commissioner in New South Wales. She had "a firm belief in the principles of Guiding, was young, keen, a dynamic personality, had a great sense of humour and fun, but was also a disciplinarian".

Nella Levy became a Girl Scout in 1908 while a boarder at Lingholt School, near Maidenhead in England, and also attended the 1909 Crystal Palace Scout Rally, which led to the foundation of the Girl Guides. During World War I she was a Patrol Leader of the Night-Hawks (later Heather Patrol) in her school Company.

In 1920, she read a newspaper report concerning a meeting of prominent women in Sydney who had decided that Guiding was not needed in New South Wales as girls already had sufficient opportunities to be outdoors. She wrote to the newspaper contradicting this feeling, and subsequently was invited to tea at Government House by Dame Margaret Davidson, wife of the Governor of New South Wales. Davidson told her "Queen Mary would like to see Girl Guides in New South Wales, and I want you to start it." Levy took the challenge. She travelled widely, recruiting volunteers, forming Companies and enrolling Guides.

The Nella Levy Chapel was an outdoor chapel at Tara, a Girl Guide camp in Silverdale, New South Wales. It was built in 1972. The property was sold for development by Girl Guides NSW/ACT in 2009–10.

The Lev Shield is a patrol camping competition for Girl Guides aged 10+, held at Innabaanya Girl Guide camp in the Australian Capital Territory.

== See also ==
- Girl Guides Australia
- Scouting and Guiding in New South Wales
