= Britannia Creek Wood Distillation Plant =

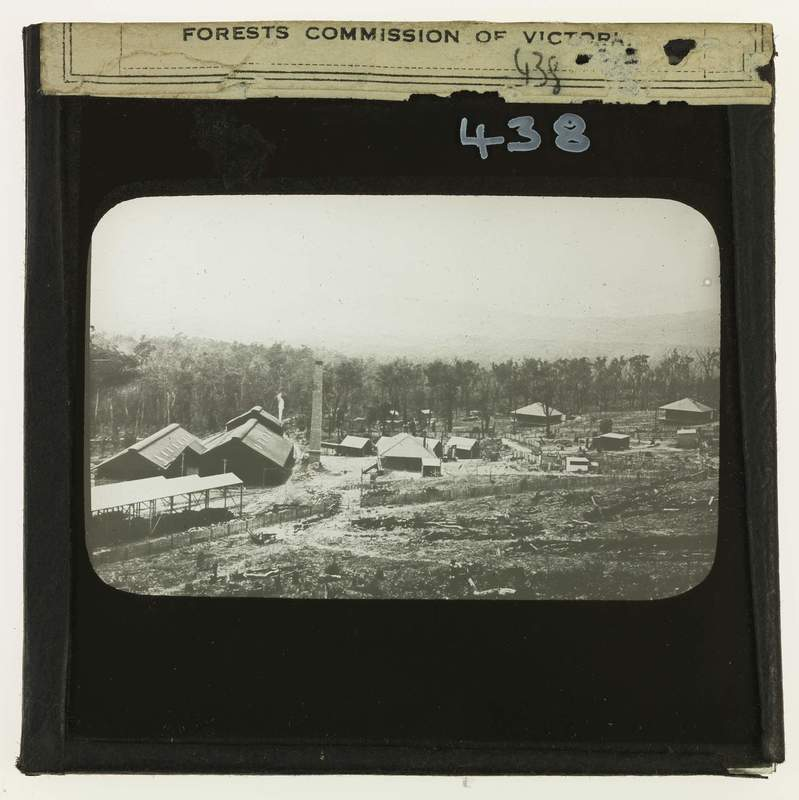
Cuming, Smith & Co, Britannia Creek Wood Distillation Plant, circa 1910.

The Britannia Creek wood distillation plant was the only commercial undertaking of its type in Australia. It formed part of the Cuming, Smith and Company and operated about 80 km east of Melbourne in the foothills of the Yarra Ranges between 1907 and 1924.

== Background ==
The plant grew out of turbulent times in the late 1880s when the State of Victoria and its capital Melbourne was experiencing an unprecedented land boom. Pastoral development, particularly in western Victoria created a big demand for fertilizers and various other chemicals which at the time were all imported.

Later during the 1890s, Australia suffered a major economic depression which multiplied the costs of imported chemicals and bulky fertilizers. Rationalising of Victoria's fledgling fertilizer industry followed with many company closures and some amalgamations.

Cuming, Smith and Co survived and seized the opportunity to investigate producing chemicals using wood waste left behind after forest harvesting.

Building on experimental plants in England and Germany the company built a large wood distillation plant at Britannia Creek near Wesburn.

The site was chosen at Britannia Creek after consultation with the State Forest Department, later the Forests Commission Victoria.

== The distillation plant ==
The new wood distillery took more than a year to build at a cost of £50000. The plant commenced operations in August 1907 following a grand opening dinner held at the local Mechanics Hall.

The company also built and operated a network of sawmills and timber tramlines to bring timber from the forest. The company mostly used horses to haul logs and timber tramlines but also owned a small steam engine known as Westward Ho.

No part of a harvested tree was wasted. Sawmills cut the main part of the log and split wood intended for distillation was stockpiled and dried for up to 18 months.

On average, 60 to 100 men were employed to distill approximately 20000 tons of wood from the adjoining state forest.

Dry billets were then loaded into a cylindrical shaped cage which held about three tons and taken to the drying chambers before the distilling retorts. The retorts were about 40 feet long and 7 feet in diameter and held four caged trucks of wood.

Controlled combustion in the oxygen-free retorts took about 30 hours. About 40 different chemicals, some liquid and some gases, were formed during the process leaving charcoal which was also in great demand for industrial gas engines and domestic uses.

One of the principal chemicals produced was acetone which was in great demand during the War of 1914-18 for the manufacture of cordite used in ammunition.

Acetone was also used for the manufacture of celluloid wearing apparel such as collars, cuffs and buttons. Acetone was also used to manufacture chloroform for anesthetic uses.

Other products included common methylated spirits and denatured alcohol.

The Warburton railway line had opened to the Yarra Valley in 1901 enabled chemical products to be shipped to markets.

The later advent of electricity from Victoria's vast brown coalfields in the Latrobe Valley after the war drastically reduced the demand for charcoal.

It wasn't until the second world war and the shortage of petrol that Victoria once again looked to charcoal as a fuel and the Forest Commission built Kurth Kiln at nearby Gembrook.

== Plant closure ==
The end of the War in 1918 opened up global trade again cheaper imports together with the decline for charcoal led to the final closure of the Britannia Creek distillation plant in 1924.

Major bushfires in 1926 razed the factory leaving little machinery or evidence of the mill's existence.

The distillation plant site was sold after the 1926 fires to Samuel Bedggood who built a new sawmill.

== Girl Guide Camp ==
After the 1926 bushfires, three company residences remained plus the original manager's house. After changing hands a few times the land and building were sold to the Victorian Girl Guides Association in 1938 and became known as Britannia Park. The Cuming residence became Guide House and the former residence used by the chief engineer became Brownie House.

== Gallery ==
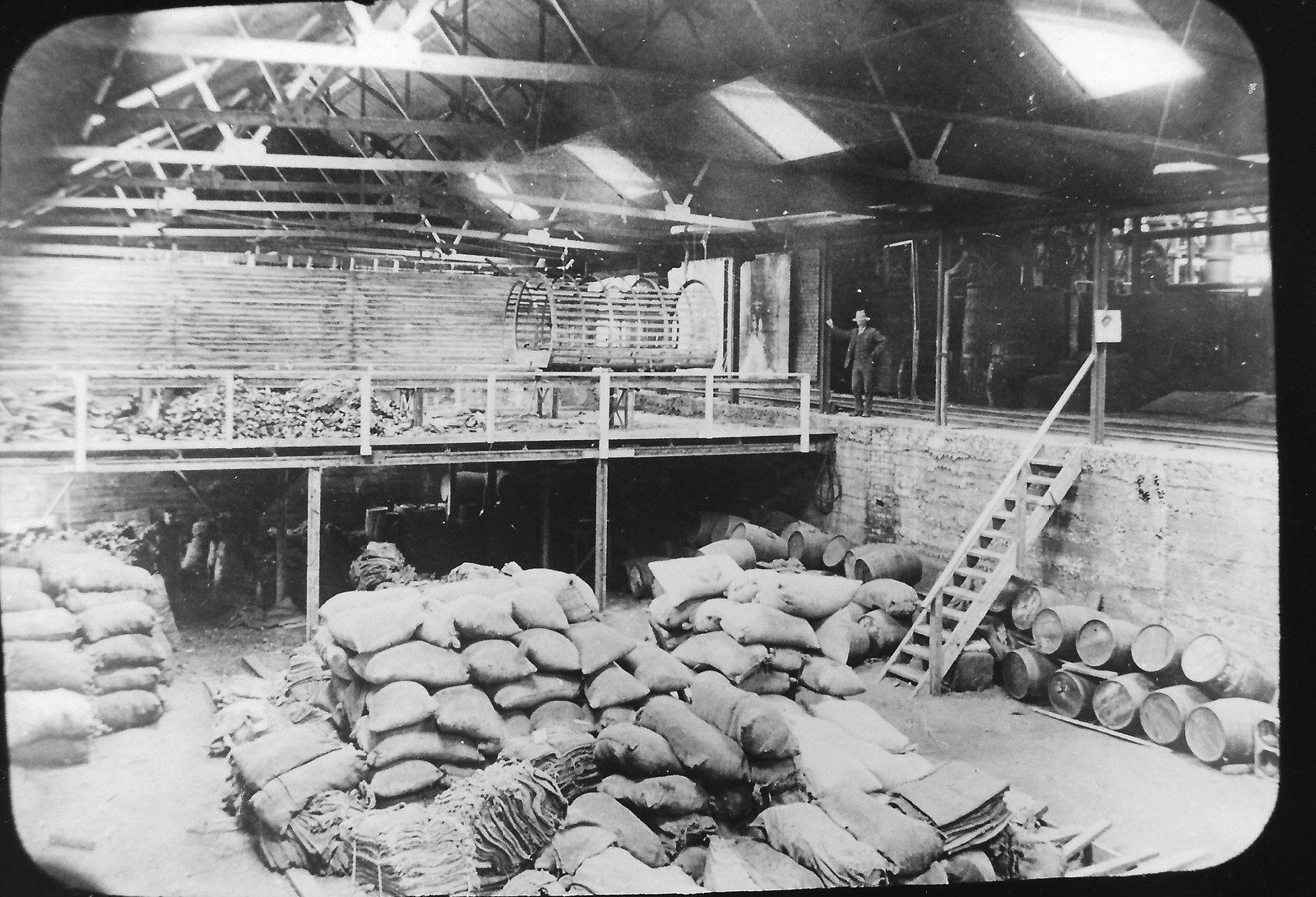
Charcoal bagging room

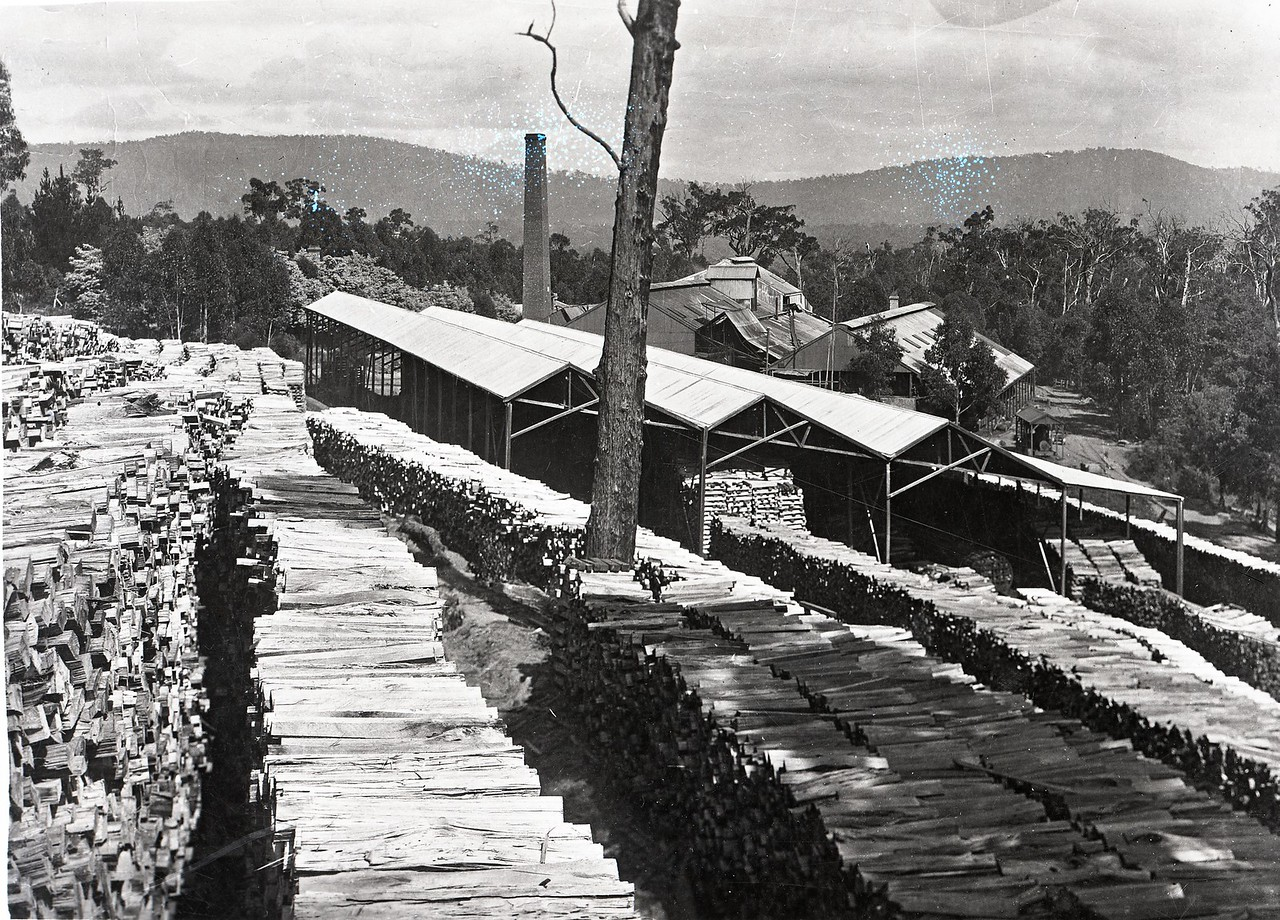
Wood pile

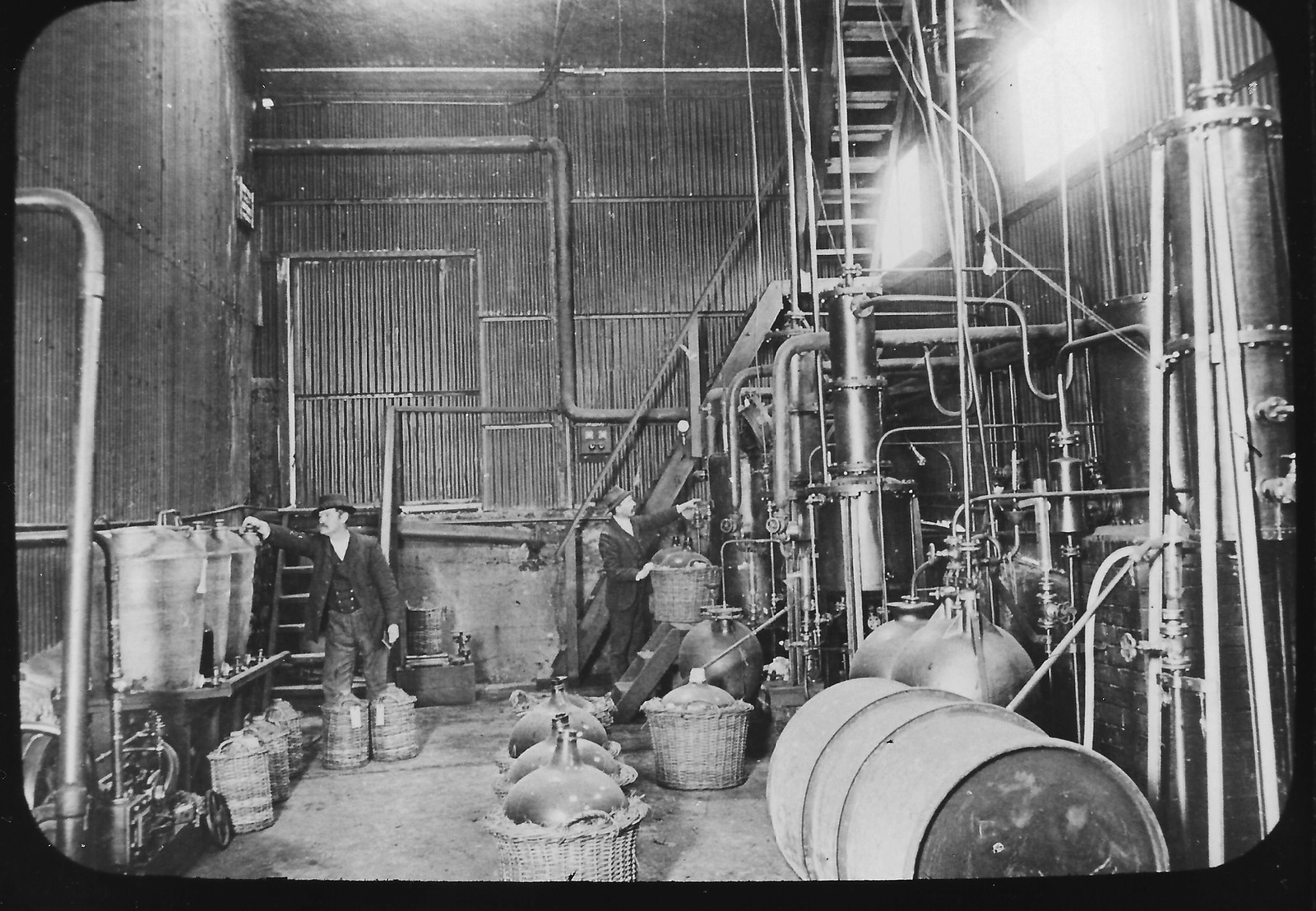
Distillation vats

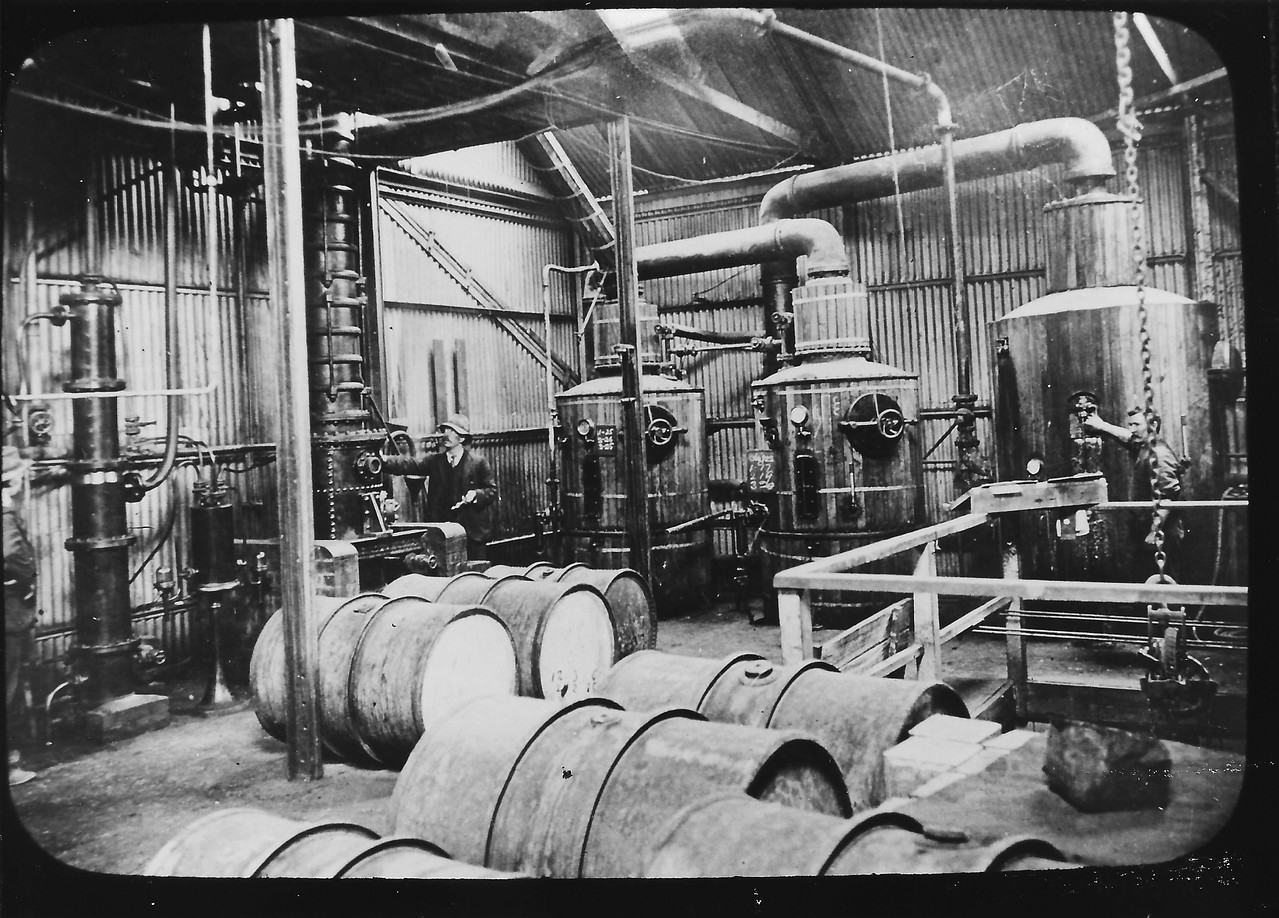

== See also ==
- Wundowie charcoal iron and wood distillation plant
