= Women's Reserve Ambulance Corps =

UK volunteer organisation during World War I

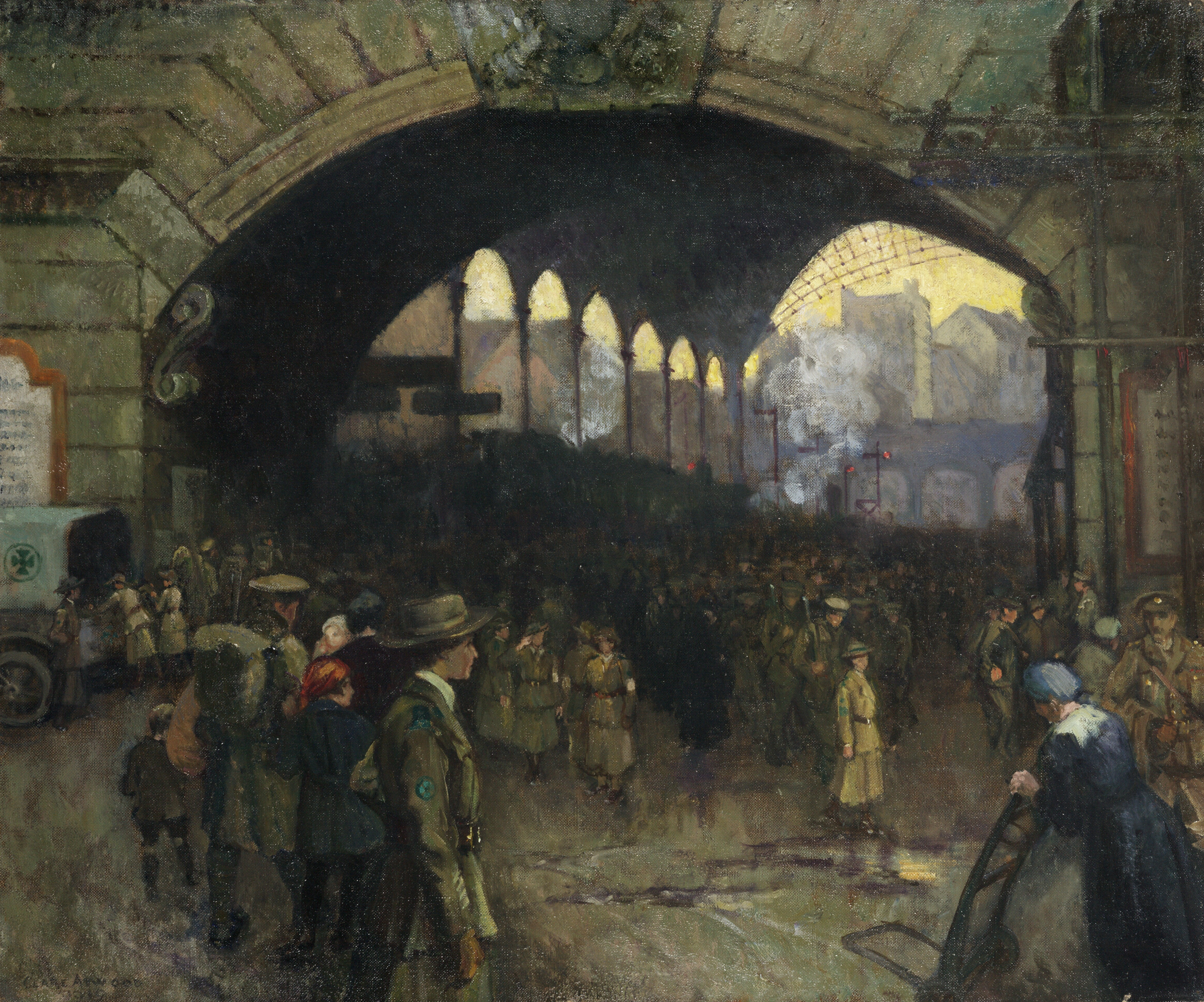
- Women's Reserve Ambulance Corps members and ambulance (with green cross markings) at Victoria Station, London in a 1918 painting
- Active: 1915–1919
- Country: United Kingdom
- Role: Medical support, auxiliary services
- Nickname: Green Cross Corps
- Engagements: First World War

Commanders
- Commandant in chief: Evelina Haverfield

The Women's Reserve Ambulance Corps (also known as the Green Cross Corps) was a volunteer aid organisation set up in the United Kingdom in 1915 during the First World War. Its members worked to direct people at stations, transport hospital patients and render assistance during German bombing raids. The corps sent personnel to the Dardanelles during the Gallipoli campaign and arranged the first all-female ambulance convoy to the British Army on the Western Front. The corps became a founding member of the Women's Army Auxiliary Corps in 1917 and continued in existence until September 1919.

== History ==
The Women's Reserve Ambulance Corps developed from British suffragette Evelina Haverfield's proposal to raise a Women's Volunteer Rifle Corps upon the outbreak of the First World War in August 1914. The Corps came into being in 1915 and was initially active only in London. Haverfield was a founder member and was later appointed commandant in chief. Rotha Lintorn-Orman, who would later found the British Fascisti was also a member. The unit, which was nicknamed the Green Cross Corps, was funded through donations and subscriptions from members of the public.

Women from the ambulance served at London's Victoria Station to provide directions to lost persons and assistance to those who were in need of overnight accommodation; this included large numbers of servicemen departing for the front and those returning wounded or on leave. At one point it was providing assistance to 16,000 service personnel a month.

The unit was first on the scene of the first major zeppelin raid on London in September 1915, helping to treat the wounded. They assisted the police in subsequent bombing raids, tending to the injured and dying, retrieving corpses and clearing the streets. In 1916 they sent the first all-female ambulance convoy to the British Army on the Western Front in France. A detachment also served in the Dardanelles during the Gallipoli campaign.

A branch of the corps was later established in Bournemouth and was known as the "Bournemouth Battalion". It comprised 3 officers and 45 other ranks and, from March 1916, was equipped with a Sunbeam motor ambulance. The battalion ferried patients from the station to various hospitals and also acted as ward orderlies, cleaners and canteen workers. The corps was a founding unit of the Women's Army Auxiliary Corps, which was established in 1917. The corps continued to serve until September 1919.

== Press reporting ==
The corps received mixed reports in the press. In 1916 the Illustrated War News stated that "of all the societies and organisations .. that the present conflict has called into being, none is doing better or more useful work than the Women's Reserve Ambulance". However it was criticised elsewhere for "encroaching too closely on male territory" and its members were accused of making use of the opportunity presented by the war to "have the time of their lives".

== Uniform ==
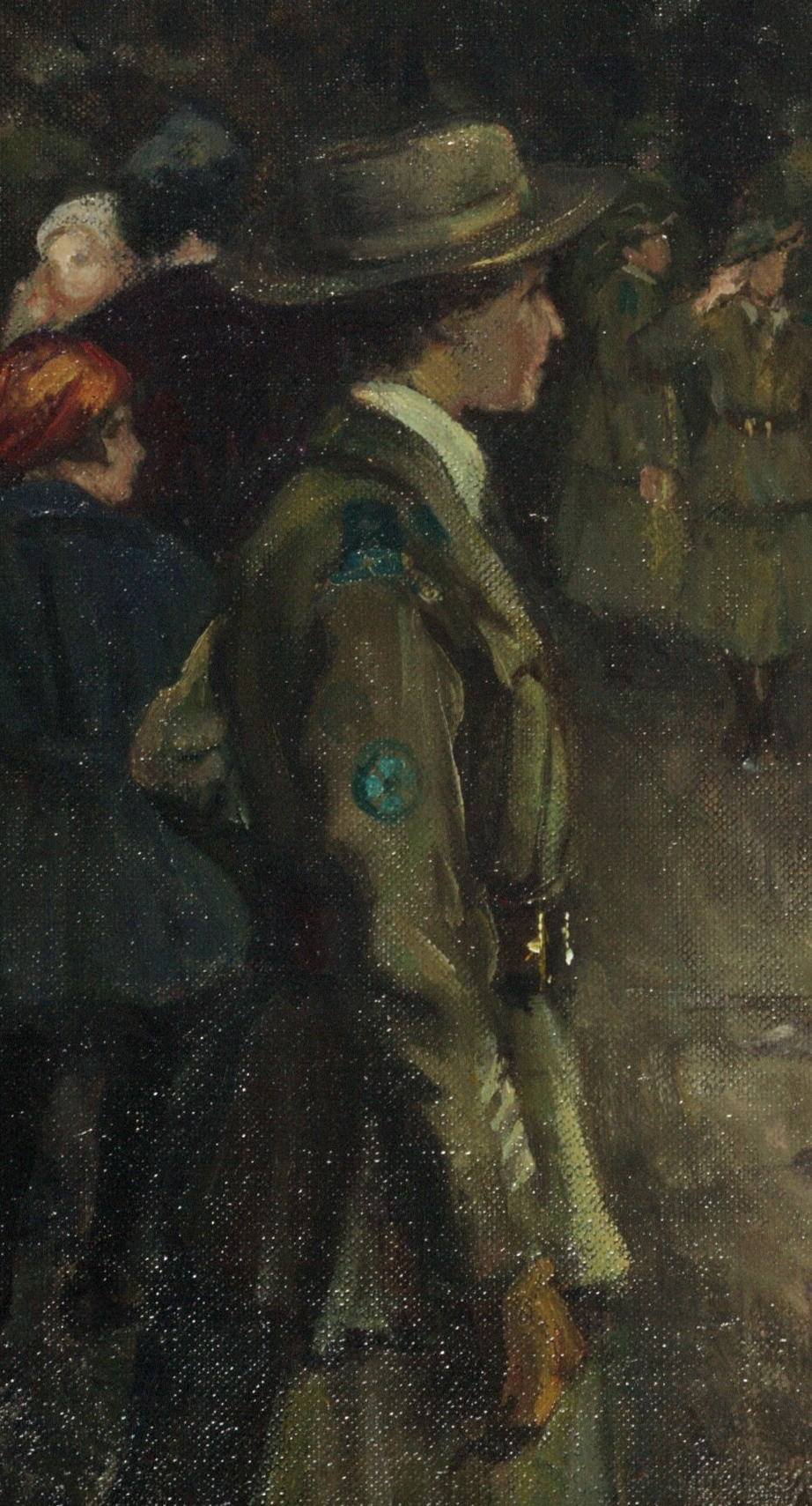
Detail of uniform

Women's Reserve Ambulance personnel wore a khaki uniform. A black metal or bronze title badge was worn on the shoulder with the text "Green Cross". A circular khaki cloth badge depicting a green Maltese cross within a green circle was worn on the arm.
