= Scout staff =

Tall stick traditionally used by Boy Scouts

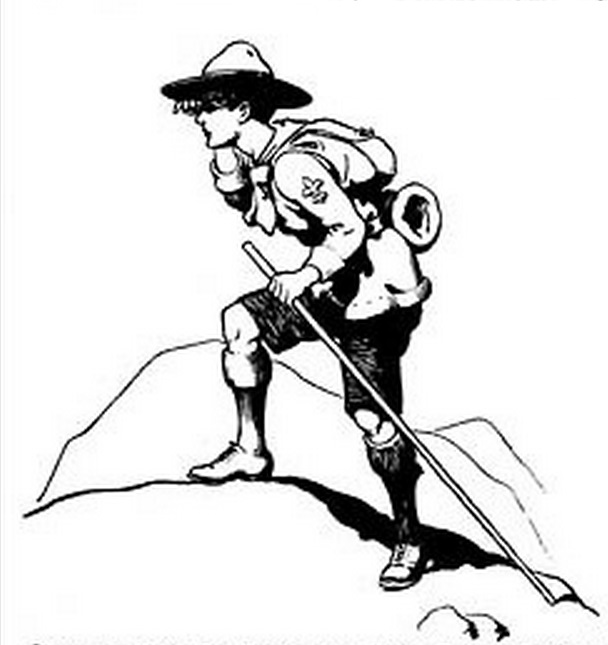
- Baden-Powell's drawing of a Boy Scout with his staff, from the front cover of Scouting for Boys: Part III, published in 1908
- Other names: Scout stave
- Classification: Pole
- Related: Quarterstaff

A Scout staff (or Scout stave) is a shoulder-high wooden pole or quarterstaff, traditionally carried by Boy Scouts as part of their accoutrements. Its main purpose was as a walking stick or trekking pole, but it had a number of other uses in emergency situations and can be used for Scout pioneering.

== History ==
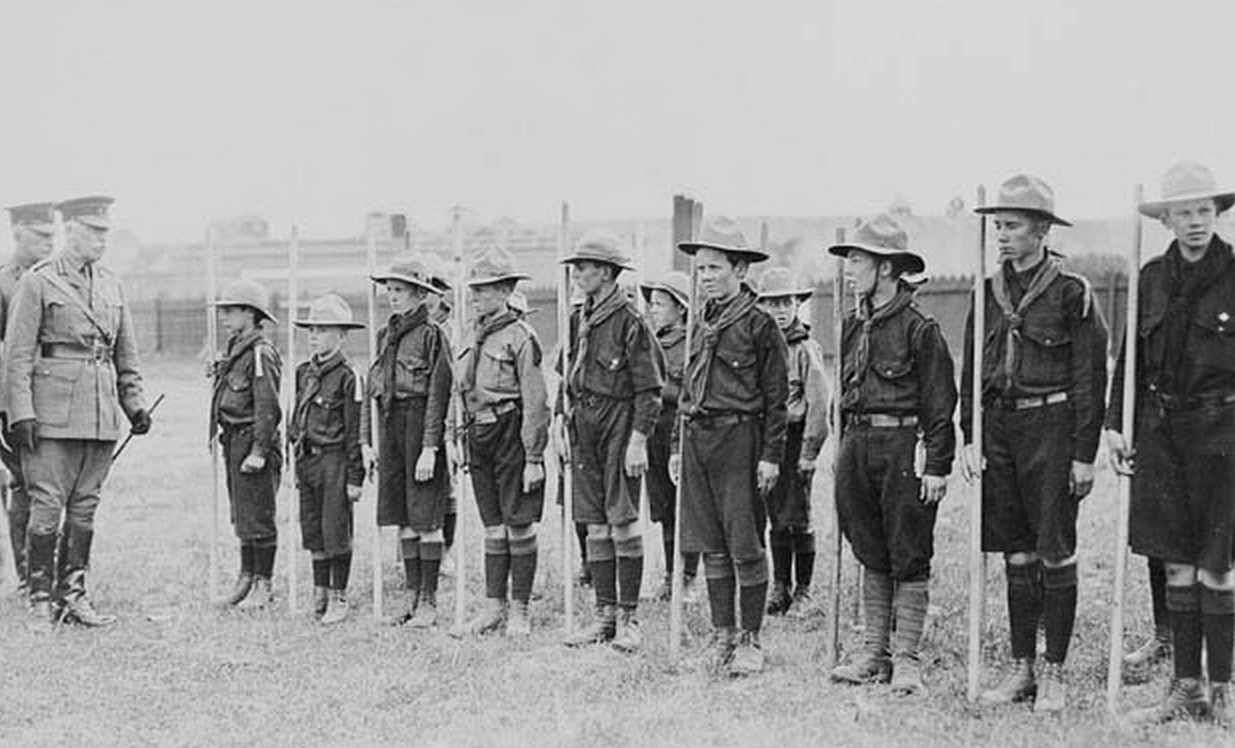
Canadian Boy Scouts on parade with their staves at Calgary in 1915.

When Robert Baden-Powell devised his scheme of Scout citizenship training for boys, published in 1908 in Scouting for Boys, he recommended that Scouts should carry "a strong stick, about as high as your nose, marked in feet and inches for measuring". After listing the various uses to which the staff could be put, he added "If you get the chance, cut your own staff, but remember to get permission first". It was said to have been based on a staff used by a Royal Engineers officer during the Fourth Anglo-Ashanti War. In August 1917, Baden-Powell wrote a critical article in the Headquarters Gazette about "the matter of Scouts being allowed to parade without their staffs, which for several reasons is regrettable". In the same article, he lists the cultural roots of the Scout staff which he claimed were "the scouts of Cuhulain armed with staffs, the pilgrims... with their cockle-shells and staffs, the 'prentice bands of London with their cloth yards and their staffs, the merry men of Robin Hood with bows and quarter staffs, down to the present-day mountaineers, war-scouts, and explorers".

At the 3rd World Scout Jamboree in 1929, French Scouts constructed an 80-foot (24-metre) replica of the Eiffel Tower constructed entirely of lashed Scout staves.

In the United Kingdom, the cost and awkwardness of the staff meant that it became common for Scout Troops to hold a stock of staves in their meeting place, rather than have Scouts carry them about. The final blow came with the 1966 Advance Party Report, which recommended that "With the exception of a knife, no present optional items of uniform (e.g. staff, thumbstick, haversack.... ) may in future be worn".

== Description ==
The official Policy, Organization and Rules of the Boy Scouts Association (UK) stipulated that the staff must be "Marked in feet and inches, five feet six inches (1.68 metres) in length". Patrol Leaders carried a white pennant on their staves, showing a silhouette of their Patrol animal (each Patrol was named after an animal or bird). Modern commercially produced Scout staves are still available in the United Kingdom, generally made from coppice grown ash.

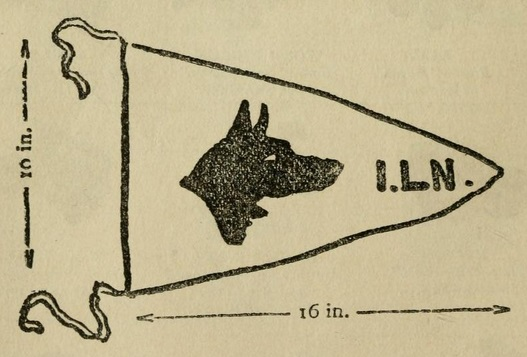
Baden-Powell's drawing of a Patrol Leader's pennant: "Each patrol leader has a small white flag on his staff with the head of his patrol animal shown in red cloth stitched on to it on both sides. Thus the 'Wolves' of the 1st London Troop would have the flag shown below".

== Uses ==
Some uses of the Scout staff that have been recommended by various Scouting publications:

- Beating out bush fires
- Construction of light bridges, huts or flagstaffs
- Estimating the height of trees or tall buildings
- Feeling the way over rough or marshy ground
- Helping each other over high obstacles
- Holding back a crowd
- Jumping over a ditch (pole vault)
- Linking Scouts together on a night hike
- Making improvised stretchers
- Measuring distances
- splinting an injured limb
- Self-defence
- Stopping an aggressive dog
- Tent pole for a small tent
- Testing the depth of a river
