= Banongill =

Historic homestead in Victoria, Australia

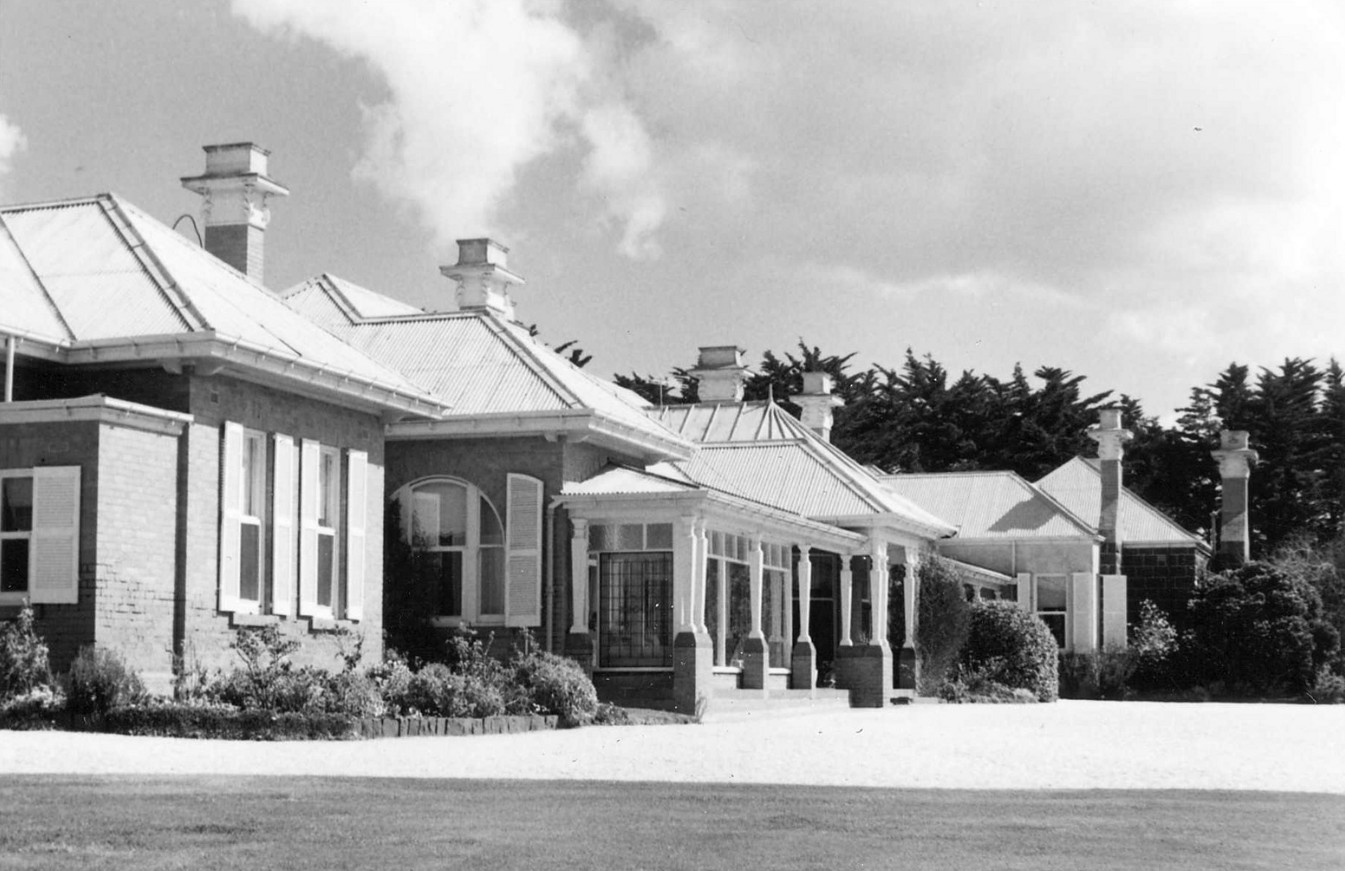
- Banongill Homestead

- Location in Corangamite Shire, Victoria
- 37°44′27″S 143°15′52″E
- Type: Homestead, associated built facilities and grounds
- Location: Skipton, Victoria, Australia
- Nearest city: Ballarat

History
- Built: 1853 (original house), 1905 (extension)
- Built for: Francis Ormond

Site notes
- Architectural style: Edwardian

Victorian Heritage Register
- Official name: Banongill Homestead
- Type: State heritage (built and natural)
- Designated: 17 December 1964
- Reference no.: 67807

Banongill is a historic pastoral property in the Western District of Victoria, Australia, near Skipton. Developed from part of the earlier Borriyaloak station, it became one of the region's major sheep-grazing estates and remained associated with several prominent pastoral families, including the Wilsons and the Fairbairns. The property is particularly noted for its 1853 homestead, with its Edwardian-era enlargement, and garden, traditionally attributed to landscape designer William Guilfoyle, and for its long history as a mixed sheep, cattle and horse-breeding enterprise.

== History ==
The origins of Banongill lie in the expansion of pastoral settlement across Victoria's Western District during the mid-nineteenth century. In 1853, a small stone shepherd's cottage was built on land that formed part of the extensive Borriyaloak station, owned by pastoralist and philanthropist Francis Ormond, later founder of Ormond College at the University of Melbourne. During the 1850s, part of the Borriyaloak run was separated from the main station and became known as Banongill.

In the 1880s the property was purchased by Samuel Wilson, another major Western District pastoralist. Wilson incorporated the original stone cottage into a larger homestead, marking the beginning of Banongill's development as a substantial independent estate.

A major phase began in 1897 when Banongill was acquired by Charles Fairbairn, a member of the influential Fairbairn pastoral family whose interests extended across Victoria and Queensland. Charles Fairbairn and his wife Elizabeth became the first of five generations of Fairbairns associated with the property. Under their ownership, Banongill expanded into one of the largest sheep stations in the district, eventually reaching around 20,000 acres (8,100 ha).

In 1905 the Fairbairns extensively altered and enlarged the homestead in an Edwardian style and established an elaborate pleasure garden around it. The garden is traditionally attributed to William Guilfoyle, with a sweeping lawn descending from the house, curving paths, pergolas and ornamental plantings. The garden became particularly famous for its daffodil collections, which were exhibited at the Royal Melbourne Show and at the Chelsea Flower Show in London.

Under Major Charles Fairbairn and his wife Irene Fairbairn, the second generation of the family at Banongill, the property developed into a highly diversified pastoral enterprise. Merino sheep and Hereford cattle were bred in large numbers, while thoroughbred horses were also raised and raced. The station supported a sizeable workforce and functioned almost as a self-contained rural community, with multiple houses, station huts, a school, and local sporting teams. The labor force included roles such as stockmen, gardeners, domestic staff, rabbit catchers and tradesmen. Major Charles Fairbairn would reputedly fly his plane around the property, and tip the plane's wing to issue an instruction.

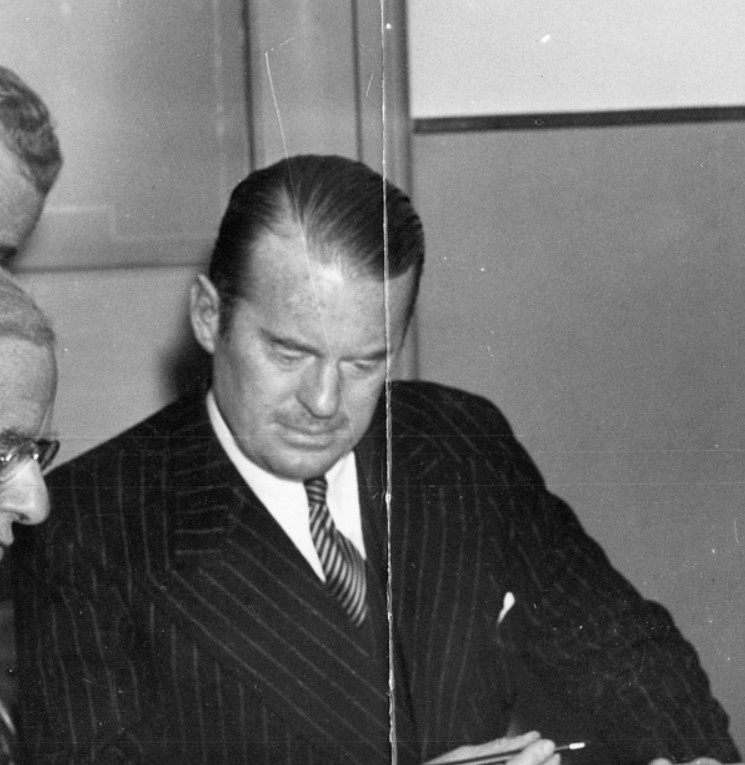
Charles Fairbairn

Banongill's scale during the 1950s and 1960s reflected the labour-intensive nature of pastoralism before widespread mechanisation. The property contained numerous paddocks and outstation huts used by shepherds, while extensive rabbit control operations were conducted across the estate. The Fairbairn family also maintained strong social and sporting connections, with tennis courts, croquet lawns and recreational activities forming part of life at the station. Bentleys and a special gun dog were imported from the United Kingdom.

Following the death of Irene Fairbairn in 1975, Banongill was purchased by Michael and Diana Lempriere. They undertook substantial modernisation and conservation work on the property, including improvements to roads and water infrastructure, extensive tree planting and fencing of waterways to encourage environmental regeneration. During their ownership the sheep flock was converted from Corriedales to Merinos, and the estate's acreage was increased through the acquisition of neighbouring land.

In 2006 Banongill was acquired by Stewart and Sue Gull. By the early 21st century, the property comprised about 17,000 acres (6,885 ha) and supported a large mixed farming operation involving Merino sheep, fat lamb production, Angus cattle and broadacre cropping.

Banongill also experienced major flooding in January 2011, when heavy rainfall across the region inundated Mount Emu Creek, damaged fencing and destroyed a century-old bridge on the property.

The property was bought in mid-2020 by Dan and Jill Bingham, who have since extensively restored the homestead.

== See also ==
- Brie Brie
