= Shooting stick =

Combined walking stick and folding chair

A shooting stick in the collection at Florence Court, County Fermanagh, Northern Ireland, maintained by the National Trust

A shooting stick is a combined walking stick and folding chair. It is generally used as a short-term seat at outdoor events.

A traditional British shooting stick consists of a wooden or metal shaft terminating at the base in a plate foot, with a bifurcated handle at top that folds out to form a simple seat. The seat may be a narrow saddle of leather or of webbing. The plate foot typically extends into a metal point intended to dig into the ground for support, although a rubber ferrule may be offered for use on hard surfaces.
