= Girl Guides Australia =

Girl Guiding organisation in Australia

- Country: Australia
- Founded: 1927
- Membership: ~19,000
- Chief Commissioner: Helen Reid
- Affiliation: World Association of Girl Guides and Girl Scouts
- Website http://www.girlguides.org.au/

Girl Guides Australia (GGA) is the national Girl Guiding organisation in Australia. Its mission is to empower "girls and young women to discover their potential as leaders of their world". Membership is open to all girls and young women from all cultures, faiths and traditions. Guiding groups formed in Australia as early as 1909, and by 1920 Girl Guide Associations had been formed in six states. In 1926 the State Associations federated and formed a national organization which became a founding member of the World Association of Girl Guides and Girl Scouts in 1928. It still operates as a federated structure made up of six state-based Guiding organisations. It has roughly 19,000 members (as of 2021) including adult and youth members. Over a million Australian women are or have been Guides. The Girl Guide emblem incorporates the Commonwealth Star.

== Promise and Law ==
=== Guide Promise ===
==== Current Promise ====
In July 2012, the Guide Promise was updated, along with the Guide Law (as below), to better reflect modern society and the perspective of current day Guides. These changes were a result of comprehensive consultation with Girl Guides throughout Australia through the Promise and Law Review.

Notable changes include the removal of explicit reference to God, instead replaced by "my beliefs", and removing reference to the Queen. This updated promise was ratified by the World Association of Girl Guides and Girl Scouts on 3 July 2012 and now stands as below:

I promise that I will do my best
To be true to myself and develop my beliefs
To serve my community and Australia
And live by the Guide Law.

==== Historically ====
For many years, the Guide Promise closely resembled that of Girlguiding UK:

I promise that I will do my best:
To do my duty to God,
to serve the Queen and my country,
To help other people, and
To keep the Guide Law.

The Girl Guides Australia Board in May 2010, passed a recommendation that Members may opt to use an alternative to the current Promise:

I promise that I will do my best:
to do my duty to God and my country;
to help other people; and
to keep the Guide Law.

Other alternatives were also agreed for members of other nationalities.

=== Guide Law ===
==== Current Guide Law ====
As a part of the Promise and Law review, the Guide Law was updated in July 2012. This followed extensive consultations with Girl Guides and Leaders, with an emphasis on identifying those principles they felt best reflected the goal of modern Guiding. The updated Guide Law was ratified by the World Association of Girl Guides and Girl Scouts on 3 July 2012 and now stands as below:

As a Guide I will strive to:
Respect myself and others
Be considerate, honest and trustworthy
Be friendly to others
Make choices for a better world
Use my time and abilities wisely
Be thoughtful and optimistic
Live with courage and strength.

==== Historically ====
The original and long-standing Guide Law, as established in 1910 was:

A Guide is loyal and can be trusted.
A Guide is helpful.
A Guide is polite and considerate.
A Guide is friendly and a sister to all Guides.
A Guide is kind to animals and respects all living things.
A Guide is obedient.
A Guide has courage and is cheerful in all difficulties.
A Guide makes good use of her time.
A Guide takes care of her own possessions and those of other people.
A Guide is self-controlled in all she thinks, says and does.

== State Guiding Organisations ==
Girl Guides Australia operates with a federated structure and individual members join their relevant State Guiding organisations. These are:

- Girl Guides NSW, ACT & NT
- Girl Guides Victoria
- Girl Guides Queensland
- Girl Guides Western Australia
- Girl Guides South Australia
- Girl Guides Tasmania

== Program ==
=== Historically ===
Prior to 1996 Girl Guides in Australia were organised into one of four youth sections based on age. These were: Gumnut Guides, age 5–7 years old; Brownie Guides, aged 7–10 years old; Girl Guides, aged 10–14 years old; Ranger Guides, aged 14–18 years old.

=== Sections ===
Since 1996, all youth members from 5–17 have been known as Guides. Units can choose their own name and can cater for guides of any age range between 5 and 18 years. Guiding resources, such as the Guide Handbooks, use the Girl Guides Developmental Stages of 5 –7, 7 – 9, 9 – 12, 12 – 14 and 14 – 17 to categories and organise resources, allowing leaders & Guides to choose as relevant for their unit.

There is also a program specifically for young women aged 18–30, known as the Olave Program. Guide Leaders are adult volunteers aged over 18, and have hold various GGA Qualifications relevant to their position.

=== The Australian Guide Program ===
The Australian Guide Program is a non-formal educational program based on shared leadership and decision-making at all ages. It is organised around the Elements, Fundamentals and Process.

The four elements of the Australian Guide Program are :

- Physical
- People
- Practical
- Self

Theses elements are essential parts of every Guiding activity.

The seven fundamentals of the Australian Guide Program are:

- Promise & Law
- Outdoors
- Service
- World Guiding
- Guiding Traditions
- Leadership Development
- Patrol System

A unit will plan their program around these fundamentals to include aspects of each in areas of the Guide's interest.

The Australian Guide Program Process is used at various levels of program planning and implementation in order to fully involved Guides in leadership and decision making. The cyclical process is: Discover – Decide – Plan – Do – Evaluate

=== Girl Recognition System ===
The Girl Recognition System is the reward or badge system of the Australian Guide Program. Individual Guides, Patrols or whole units can choose to work towards appropriate challenges in a wide range of areas, though it is not compulsory. There are 4 main types of challenge badges (Explore, Create, Achieve and Discover) each pursued in a different way. Some allow Guides to set their own personal challenges, some have set criteria; some focus on a certain topic or skill, others cover a group of skills in an area, and some are based on a wide variety of different areas across the Australian Guide Program.

==== Major Awards ====
Girl Guides Australia has a number of major awards that Guides can work towards.

===== Queen's Guide Award =====
The Queens Guide Award is the peak youth achievement award in Girl Guides Australia. It provides opportunities for personal development and self-awareness, in addition to community service and a specific focus. The Award is made up of 3 parts. Part A: Gold Endeavour - Promise and Law, Guiding Traditions, Service, Outdoor, World Guiding, Patrol System and Leadership. Part B: Interest and Part C: Focus. Guides aged 14+ can begin their Queens Guide award, and all challenges must be completed by the Guides 18th birthday. It is a significant commitment, held in high regard around Australia, and can count towards high school graduation certificate in some states. The award is presented by the state governor at an award ceremony.

===== BP Award =====
The BP Award is open for Guides aged 10–18. Guide must complete 3 significant challenges in each of the areas of Promise and Law, Outdoors, Service, World Guiding, Guiding Traditions, and Patrol System. The BP Award is presented at significant awards ceremony.

===== Junior BP Award =====
The Junior BP Award is open for Guides aged 7–11. Guide must complete 2 significant challenges in each of the areas of Promise and Law, Outdoors, Service, World Guiding, Guiding Traditions, and Patrol System.

===== The Duke of Edinburgh's Award =====
The Duke of Edinburgh's International Award has three levels of Award – Bronze, Silver and Gold. Any girl 14 years and over can join Guides to participate in The Duke of Edinburgh's International Award. The guide can register through the State Girl Guides organisation and join a local Award Centre of girls the same age. Guides are provided with many opportunities to learn new skills, give service, participate in a recreational activity or expedition and take part in a residential camp – this could even be at a WAGGGS World Centre such as SANGAM in India.

===== Commonwealth Award =====
The Commonwealth Award is open to Guides in all Commonwealth Countries. In Australia it is open to Guides aged 14–30 years old. It includes challenges based on:

- the history of Guiding,
- knowledge of the Commonwealth and a Commonwealth Country other than the Guide's own,
- community action
- and two of the following areas: Health, Environment, Cultural Heritage, Fit for Life Out of Doors, Public Speaking/Debating, Creative Writing, Citizenship, Investigation

===== Olave Baden Powell Award =====
The Olave Baden Powell Award is the peak achievement award for members of the Olave Program aged 18–30. It involves a commitment between 2 and 6 years and involves completing personal challenges in each of the areas of Promise & Law, Our Community, Heritage and Traditions, International Guiding, Social Networks and Self Development.
The award is named after Olave St Clair Baden-Powell. Lady Baden-Powell was the first Chief Guide for Britain and the wife of Lord Robert Baden-Powell, the founder of Scouting and Girl Guides.

== Girl Guide Biscuits ==
Girl Guides biscuit sales were discontinued in Australia in 2021.

In 2020, a new range of biscuits was introduced to replace the previous product range which had been in place since 2016. The three flavours of individually packaged biscuits, manufactured by Snowy Mountains Cookies (SMC), were:

- triple choc biscuits
- ANZAC biscuits
- Gluten-free lemon, lime and coconut biscuits

The money raised by biscuit sales was spent at a local and national level. Biscuits were sold online as well as in the community by individual Guide units. The new biscuit range was noted as being in line with Girl Guides Australia values, being more environmentally sustainable, palm oil free, and using free range eggs.

The previous range of biscuits, which came in traditional, mini-choc chip, and gluten-free buttery shortbread, were manufactured in Australia by Modern Baking Company.

== Events ==
=== Jamboree ===
Every few years Girl Guides Australia organise a large gathering of Australian Girl Guides in a National or International Jamboree. Girl guides or girl scouts aged 10 to 17 from around the world may attend.

==== List ====
- 1997–98 - Koninderie - 1st Australian Youth Gathering held 31 December 1997 to 9 January 1998 at Stanwell Tops, New South Wales
- 2001 - Odyssey - 2nd Australian Youth Gathering held 4–13 January at Britannia Park (Girl Guides Victoria)
- 2010 - Australian Centenary Event (ACE) International camp held 3–9 January 2010 in Geelong
- 2013 - Fantastic International Jamboree held 6–12 January 2013 near Launceston, Tasmania
- 2015 - Great Bunya Gathering International Jamboree held 25 September - 2 October in Ipswich, Queensland
- 2018 - Sydney International Jamboree held 30 September to 6 October 2018 at Newington Armory in Sydney
- 2023 - Kani-Karrung Girl Guide National Jamboree held 15–21 January 2023 in Ballarat, Victoria with 1400 attendees.
- 2025 - Bush 2 Beach Girl Guide Jamboree held 28 September to 5 October 2025 in Murwillumbah, New South Wales.

== Centenary ==
In 2010, Girl Guides Australia celebrated 100 years of Guiding across Australia. The centenary ran from September 2009 to February 2011.

== See also ==
- Irene Fairbairn
- Nella Levy
- Eleanor Manning
- Joyce Price
- Scouts Australia
