= Scouts' Own =

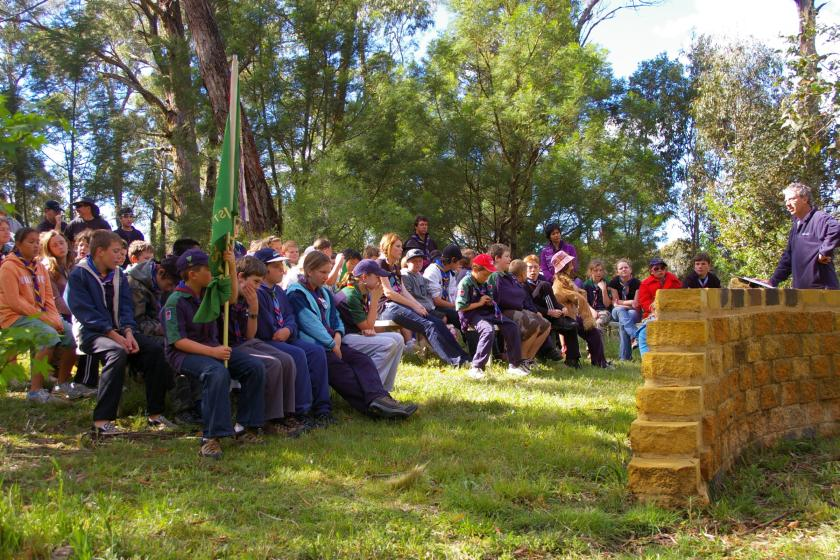
- Australian Scouts attend Scouts' Own, an informal, spiritual Scouting ceremony

Scouts' Own or Guides' Own is an inspirational, informal ceremony held as part of Scouting or Guiding activities.

A Scouts' Own service is usually short, often lasting no longer than 15 minutes. They are made up of a mixture of readings, prayers, reflections and music. Many Scouts' Owns are based on a particular theme, such as friendship, using resources wisely, or fairness. This might be connected to a certain event or occasion.

== History ==
H. Geoffrey Elwes established the idea of Scouts' Own. The first was held in 1909 at the Crystal Palace Rally in London and were originally meant to be simple interdenominational religious celebrations. "Uncle" Elwes advocated a strongly Christian content for the Scouts' Own and later disagreed with the founder of Scouting, Robert Baden-Powell, who favoured an interfaith approach. Baden-Powell approvingly described a Scouts' Own at the international Scouters' training centre at Gilwell Park, in which a visiting Arab Scouter had read verses from the Quran in addition to a reading from the Gospels. Baden-Powell diplomatically avoided confrontation with Elwes and various church leaders, but by 1930, it was Baden-Powell's doctrine that was being promoted in Scout training manuals and books.

In 1928, Baden-Powell described his views on the subject in The Scouter:

For an open Troop, or for Troops in camp, I think the Scouts' Own should be open to all denominations, and carried on in such a manner as to offend none. There should not be any special form, but it should abound in the right spirit, and should be conducted not from any ecclesiastical point of view, but from that of the boy. Everything likely to make an artificial atmosphere should be avoided. We do not want a kind of imposed Church parade, but a voluntary uplifting of their hearts by the boys in thanksgiving for the joys of life, and a desire on their part to seek inspiration and strength for greater love and service for others.

A Scouts' Own should have as big an effect on the boys as any service in church, if in conducting the Scouts' Own we remember that boys are not grown men, and if we go by the pace of the youngest and most uneducated of those present. Boredom is not reverence, nor will it breed religion.

To interest the boys, the Scout's Own must be a cheery and varied function. Short hymns (three verses are as a rule quite enough-never four); understandable prayers; a good address from a man who really understands boys (a homily "talk" rather than an address), which grips the boys, and in which they may laugh or applaud as the spirit moves them, so that they take a real interest in what is said. If a man cannot make his point to keen boys in ten minutes he ought to be shot! If he has not got them keen, it would be better not to hold a Scouts' Own at all.

== Individual organizations ==
Scouting America no longer officially uses the term Scouts' Own, preferring "outdoor worship service" or "interfaith worship service".

The Policy, Organisation and Rules of The Scout Association in the UK advise that "Scouts' Own Services may be held for the purpose of spiritual reflection and to promote a fuller understanding of the significance of the Scout Promise and Law."

== See also ==
- Religion in Scouting
