= H. Geoffrey Elwes =

"Uncle" Henry Geoffrey Elwes (Q3, 1873, Colchester England – 21 September 1936, Colchester) was a prominent early leader and writer in the Scout Movement and officer of The Boy Scouts Association.

== Background ==
Elwes was born in Colchester in the third quarter of 1873, one of four children to Henry Hervey Elwes and Caroline Elizabeth Elwes (born Whalley). He became a solicitor, and was admitted in 1895. He founded a young men's club in 1902 in Colchester. He had to use a wheelchair after 1922.

== Scouting ==
He founded the 1st Colchester Boy Scouts in 1908, having previously been involved in the Boys' Brigade. He invented the Scouts Own religious service (known as Guides Own in the Girl Guides), introduced at the Crystal Palace Rally in 1909. He and his Colchester Boy Scouts established and ran the St.George's Scout Club in Colchester, which served soldiers and sailors during World War I and continued until around 1930.

He was on The Boy Scouts Association headquarters staff from 1909 and its committee from its establishment in 1910 until his death in 1936. From 1911 to 1926, he was editor of The Boy Scouts Association's Headquarters Gazette (re-named The Scouter in 1922). He was prominent in developing schemes for older scouts and former scouts, including the formation of the Scouts Friendly Society in 1914, senior scout proposals, Rovers and Old Scouts, becoming Commissioner for Old Scouts. In 1932 he authored The Boy Scouts Association pamphlet, Old Scouts. Who they are, How to organize them. What they can do?. Although a supporter of the Scout Movement, he clashed with The Boy Scouts Association's founder and Chief Scout, Robert Baden-Powell, over religion. Elwes was staunch in his Christianity while Baden-Powell was less sectarian in his approach.

In 1931 he authored The Scouting Spirit. Part 1 Jan 1911 to Dec 1914 (C. Arthur Pearson, 1931). This book contains extracts from his writings in The Boy Scouts Association Headquarters Gazette under the headings "From the Editor's Chair" and, later, "From the Uncle's Chair". There was no Part 2.

Facing the title page is this:

Oh, put me in touch with the heart of boy,
Let me study his doubts and fears.
Oh, let me show him the way of Life,
And help him avoid his tears.
For the heart of a boy in its buoyancy,
Is a heart that is pure and free.
Oh, put me in touch with the heart of boy,
The heart of a man to be
