= Irene Fairbairn =

(1899–1974) Girl Guide commissioner

Irene Fairbairn CBE

Chief Commissioner of Guides Australia

Personal details
- Born: 30 March 1899 Stamford Hill, Hackney, London
- Died: 14 March 1974 (aged 74) East Melbourne, Victoria, Australia

Irene Florence Fairbairn, CBE (30 March 1899 – 14 March 1974) served as the Chief Commissioner of Guides Australia. She was a 1947 recipient of the Silver Fish Award, the highest adult award in Girlguiding, awarded for outstanding service to Girlguiding combined with service to world Guiding.

Fairbairn née Ridley was born in 1899 in London. During WW I she served as a volunteer aide at Hospital for Wounded Officers and received a service medal from the British Red Cross Society. In 1922 she married Charles Osborn Fairbairn. The same year she joined the Beaufort-Skipton Association of the Girl Guides Australia in Victoria. In 1947 Fairbairn became the first Federal Commissioner of the Girl Guides Association of Australia. In 1952 the title changed to Chief Commissioner and Fairbairn continued in that post until 1955. After she left that post she became the State Commissioner for Girl Guides Victoria, serving until 1963. In 1969 Fairbairn became life Vice-President of Girl Guides Australia. She died on 14 March 1974 in East Melbourne.

In 1955 the Irene Fairbairn Fund was established to provide Guides and Leaders to attend Australian and International Events.

== See also ==
- Banongill
