= Charles Orman =

English cricketer and British Army officer (1859–1927)

Personal information
- Full name: Charles Edward Lintorn-Orman
- Born: 6 September 1859; Roorkee, British India
- Died: 11 February 1927 (aged 67); Epping, Essex, England
- Batting: Right-handed
- Role: Batsman

Domestic team information
- Years: Team
- 1896: Essex

Career statistics
Competition	FC
Matches	2
Runs scored	16
Batting average
100s/50s
Top score
Balls bowled
Wickets
Bowling average
5 wickets in innings
10 wickets in match
Best bowling
Catches/stumpings
- Source: ESPNcricinfo, 27 July 2013

Charles Edward Orman or, after 1912, Charles Edward Lintorn-Orman (6 September 1859 – 11 February 1927) was an English soldier and cricketer.

Orman was commissioned in 1878 from the Royal Military College, Sandhurst, and was promoted to major in the Essex Regiment in 1895. He played two matches for Essex County Cricket Club in 1896.

In 1893, at St Stephen's Church, South Kensington, he married Blanche Lintorn Simmons, daughter of Field Marshal Sir Lintorn Simmons. The Orman family adopted the surname of Lintorn-Orman by deed poll in 1912. His daughter, Rotha Lintorn-Orman, founded the British Fascisti.
