= Trekking pole =

Used by hikers for balance and extra exercise

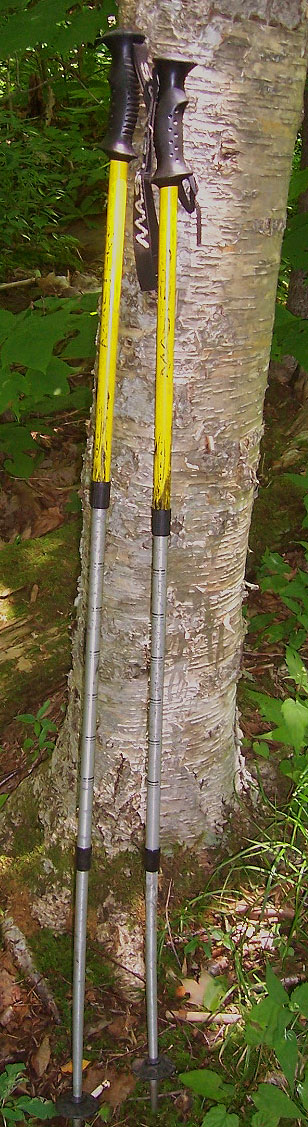
A pair of trekking poles

Trekking poles (also known as hiking poles, hiking sticks or walking poles) are a common hiking accessory that function to assist walkers with their rhythm, to provide stability, and reduce strain on joints on rough terrain.

== Description ==
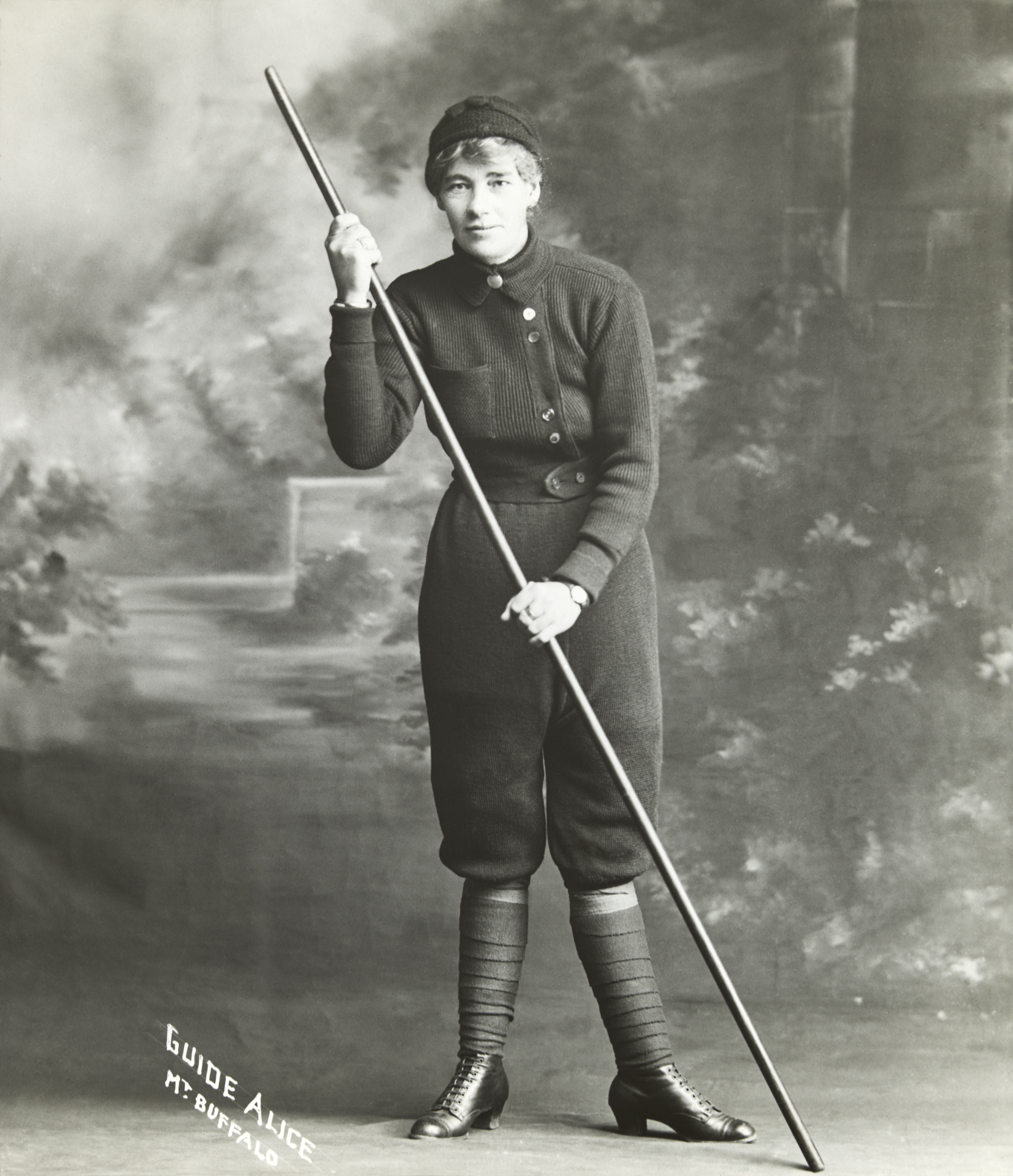
Mountain guide Alice Manfield with a long wooden walking pole in the early 1900s

When in use, modern trekking poles resemble ski poles as they have many features in common, such as baskets at the bottom to prevent the pole sinking through unstable surfaces, and rubber-padded handles and wrist straps to strengthen holding grip. Their maximum length is usually 135 cm (54 inches), however, unlike ski poles, they are often made in two or three sections and can be extended and retracted as necessary for use and collapsed for storage or transport. When fully retracted it may be possible to attach them to a backpack. Some poles come with spring-loaded sections to aid walking under normal conditions and to reduce wrist strain, but such devices may only add unwanted weight and noise to the poles. They are usually made from lightweight aluminum or carbon fiber.

== Uses ==
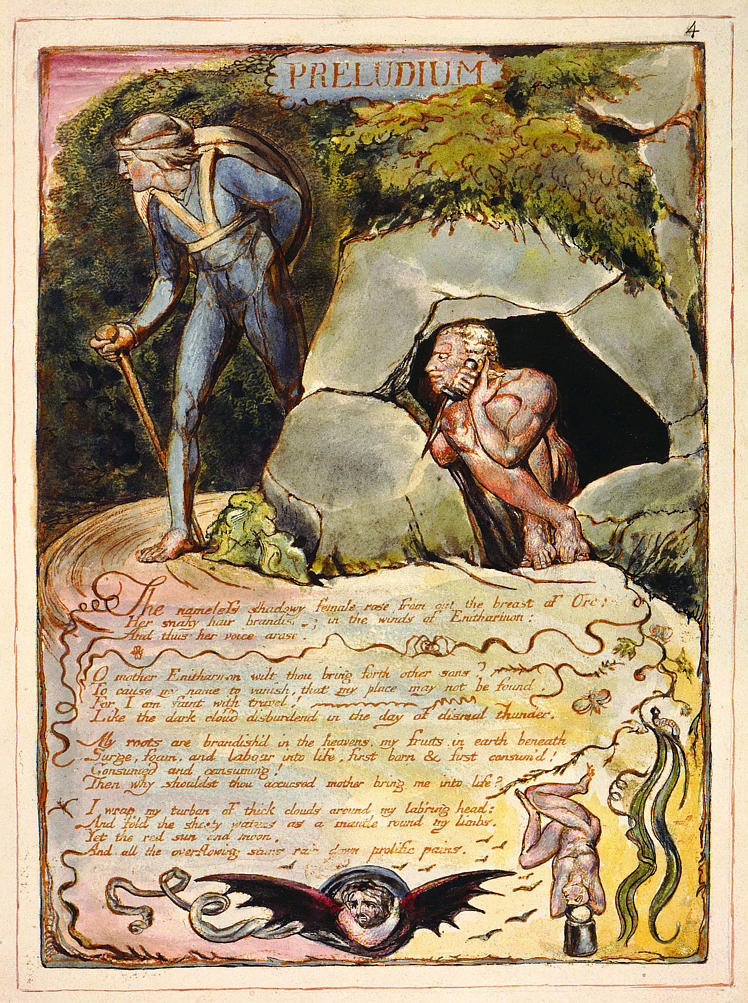
A man bearing a hiking staff in an etching from William Blake's Europe a Prophecy first printed in 1794. This copy of the etching is currently held by the Fitzwilliam Museum

Descendants of the common walking stick, trekking poles are usually used by hikers for the same reasons — to provide some rhythm to their walking pace and for added support. On flat, smooth terrain they really aren't necessary although using them can increase the exercise a hiker gets from the trip, as well as increase the speed. But on less certain terrain, or steep slopes, they provide useful lateral stability, and many turn to them for help with knee pain. They can also be used as aids when climbing rocks or boulders, to probe the depth of mud or water and facilitate a crossing. When traversing steep slopes for long distances, some hikers make one pole shorter than the other to make those trips feel more as if they were taking place on level ground.

Some backpacking tents are designed to use trekking poles as tent poles. Along the same lines, trekking poles can be used to set up a Bivouac shelter. Hikers who take to snowshoes in winter find trekking poles especially useful.

They can also be used in Nordic walking in a rural or urban environment.

== Use ==
The Appalachian Trail Conservancy (ATC) estimates that pole usage rates on the Appalachian Trail vary from 90% among thru-hikers to 10–15% among day hikers.

== Environmental impact concerns ==
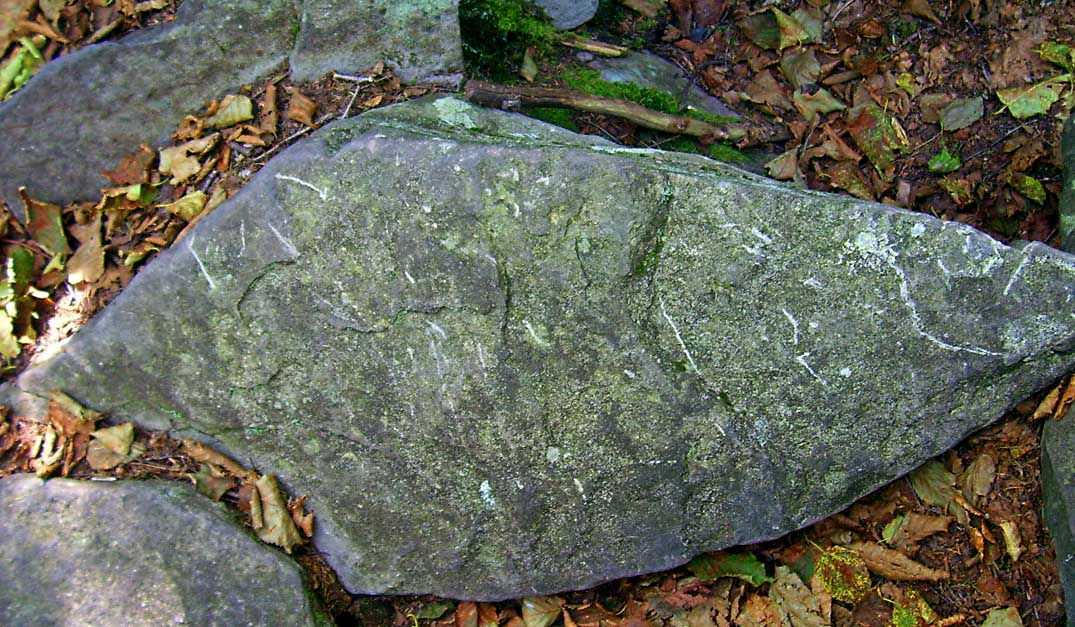
An impact of trekking poles, scratches left by poles on a rock in a wilderness area

Some hikers have complained that pole use can leave a visible impact on the surrounding trail, for instance poking visible holes in the ground and damaging adjacent vegetation. In particular, the most common complaint is that the carbide tips leave visible white scratches on rock and make scraping sounds. All these can detract from the wilderness experience.

The Appalachian Trail Conservancy (ATC) recommends several measures to mitigate the environmental impact of trekking poles in accordance with Leave No Trace principles of low-impact backcountry recreation. Hikers, it says, should not only be aware of what they put their poles into, they should remove the pole baskets unless hiking in snow and use rubber tips to avoid scratch marks on rocks. On level sections, or in areas where the potential for adverse impact is high, the ATC suggests putting the poles away entirely.

== Health benefits ==
"Nordic walking", a type of walking with poles, has been found to have beneficial effects on resting heart rate, blood pressure, exercise capacity, maximal oxygen consumption, and quality of life in patients with various diseases, and to be superior to brisk walking without poles and in some endpoints to jogging.

== See also ==
- Hiking equipment
- Hiking
- Nordic walking
- Walking stick
