= Rotha Lintorn-Orman =

British fascist leader (1895–1935)

- Lintorn-Orman in 1916

Leader of the British Fascists
- In office 6 May 1923 – 1933
- Preceded by: Position established
- Succeeded by: Dorothy Grace Waring

Personal details
- Born: Rotha Beryl Lintorn Orman; 7 February 1895 London, England
- Died: 10 March 1935 (aged 40) Santa Brígida, Canary Islands, Spain
- Movement: British Fascism
- Father: Charles Orman
- Military Service
- Allegiance: United Kingdom
- Units: Women's Emergency Corps; Scottish Women's Hospitals for Foreign Service
- Conflicts: First World War

Rotha Beryl Lintorn Lintorn-Orman (born Rotha Beryl Lintorn Orman, 7 February 1895 – 10 March 1935) was a British political activist and First World War veteran who founded the British Fascists, the first avowedly fascist movement to appear in British politics.

== Early life ==
Lintorn-Orman was born at 36 Cornwall Gardens, South Kensington, London, to Charles Edward Orman, a major from the Essex Regiment, and his wife, Blanche Orman (née Simmons). Her maternal grandfather was Field Marshal Sir Lintorn Simmons. Upon her grandfather's death in February 1903, Lintorn-Orman's mother inherited the family's immense wealth, since she was probably the only surviving child at the time. The Orman family adopted the surname of Lintorn-Orman by deed poll in 1912.

Raised in Bournemouth in Hampshire, before moving to Liphook, Hampshire, at the age of nine, Lintorn-Orman was among the few girls seeking entry into scouting organisations; along with her friend Nesta Maude. In 1908, Lintorn-Orman had registered for a Scout troop using initials rather than forenames. By 1909, she had led both the first and second Bournemouth Girl Guides and she was awarded one of the first of the Girl Guides' Silver Fish Awards in 1911.

When the First World War broke out, Lintorn-Orman joined the war effort as an ambulance driver. Initially serving with the Women's Volunteer Reserve, she was assigned to the Scottish Women's Hospital Corps and sent to the Serbian front in 1916. During her time in the war, she was, according to a later report in the fascist press, twice decorated with the Croix de Charité, awarded for gallantry in action, for "heroic rescues in Salonica". (Note: Gottlieb 2008 casts doubt as to the legitimacy of her awards, but Thurlow 1987 does not.) In 1917, she contracted malaria and returned to London, joining the Red Cross. In 1918, she became Commandant of the British Red Cross Motor School at Devonshire House, which put her in charge of training all ambulance drivers for the Red Cross.

== Fascism ==
Emblem of the British Fascists

Following her war service, Lintorn-Orman placed an advertisement in the right-wing journal The Patriot seeking anti-communists. This led to the foundation of the British Fascisti (later the British Fascists) in 1923 as a response to the growing strength of the Labour Party, a source of great anxiety for the virulently anti-communist Lintorn-Orman. She felt Labour was too prone to advocating class conflict and internationalism, two political positions she strongly opposed.

Financed by her mother Blanche, Lintorn-Orman's party nonetheless struggled due to her preference for remaining within the law and her continuing ties to the fringes of the Conservative Party. Lintorn-Orman was essentially a Tory by inclination but was driven by a strong anti-communism and attached herself to fascism largely because of her admiration for Benito Mussolini and what she saw as his action-based style of politics. The party was subject to a number of schisms, such as when the moderates led by R. B. D. Blakeney defected to the Organisation for the Maintenance of Supplies during the 1926 General Strike or when the more radical members resigned to form the National Fascisti, and ultimately lost members to the Imperial Fascist League and the British Union of Fascists when these groups emerged. Lintorn-Orman wanted nothing to do with the BUF as she considered its leader, Oswald Mosley, to be a near-communist and was particularly appalled by his former membership in the Labour Party. The feelings were reciprocated; Mosley referred to the British Fascists as "three old ladies and a couple of office boys", though Lintorn-Orman was only 37 years old. Mosley's son claimed that Lintorn-Orman got the idea to save Britain from communism one day while she was weeding her kitchen garden. Nonetheless, the BF lost much of its membership to Mosley's party after Neil Francis Hawkins defected to the BUF in 1932 after a formal merger was narrowly rejected.

== Final years ==
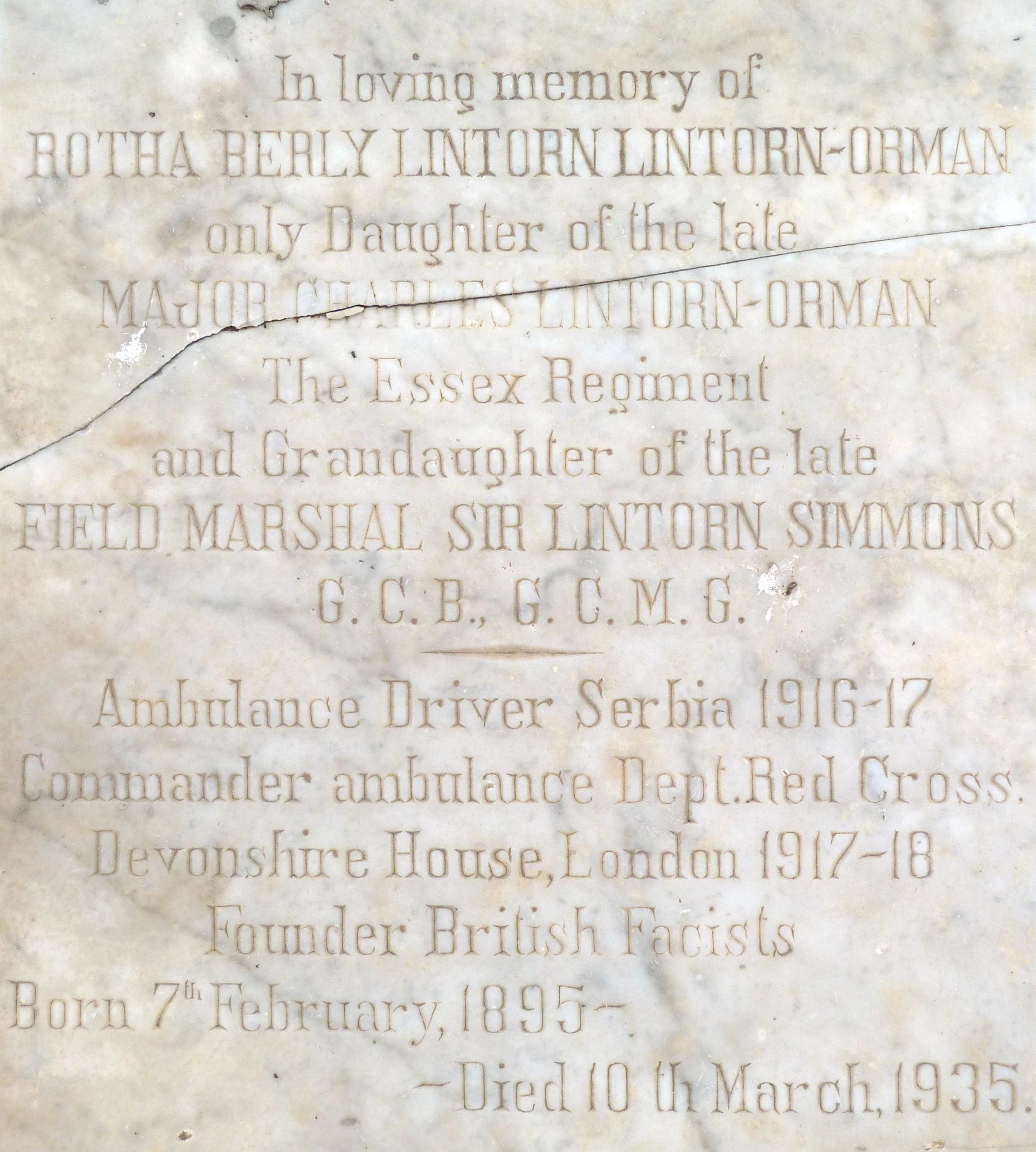
Gravestone in the English Cemetery, Las Palmas de Gran Canaria

Lintorn-Orman was dependent on alcohol and drugs, which the Home Office used to disparage the British Fascists. Rumours about her sexual orientation began to damage her reputation. In 1933, her mother stopped funding her after hearing lurid tales of drink, drugs and orgies. The same year, Lintorn-Orman was taken ill and was sidelined from the British Fascists, as effective control passed to Mrs D. G. Harnett, who sought to breathe new life into the group by seeking to ally it with Ulster loyalism.

Lintorn-Orman died of an alcohol-related illness at the age of 40 on 10 March 1935 at Santa Brígida, Las Palmas, in the Canary Islands. By then her organisation was all but defunct.
