= Lone Guides =

Guides movement members who are isolated

Lone Guides or Lones are Girl Guides and Girl Scouts who do not attend group meetings for a variety of reasons. They are organised into groups that keep in touch, for example, by letter or email. Members carry out their organisation's normal programme on their own as much as they are able. The first official Lone Guides started in 1912 in the UK. Many countries have Lone Guides.

== Lone Guiding by country and organisation ==
=== Australia – Guides Australia ===
"Lone Guides" communicate monthly through magazines put together by dedicated Leaders, with contributions and letters from the girls.

Lones of the Air talk to Guiders and other Guides on radios.

Lone Satellite Guides use a computer satellite link to keep in contact.

=== Canada – Girl Guides of Canada Guides du Canada ===
Lone Guides are recorded as early as 1916 in Canada. Lone Brownies, Guides, Pathfinders and Rangers exist in most provinces.

In 1930 in Nova Scotia, the province's first Lone company was formed.

Helen Kidd, a Lone Guide from Nova Scotia received the Commonwealth Prize in 1955.

=== New Zealand – GirlGuiding New Zealand ===
In New Zealand, there is a project to offer Guiding over the internet for girls between 5 and 18.

=== United Kingdom – Girlguiding UK ===
Lone Guiding started in 1912. The first Lone Guide conference was held at Foxlease in 1923. In 1925, separate Lone Ranger companies were started. Lone Guiding still operates in the UK at every level.

Within Scotland Region Lones is set up as a separate County with all the same rights an privileges of a physical county. A county commissioner is appointed on a 5-year termly basis who in turn supports leaders who are assigned to each Section.

The most populous sections are Guides (age 10–16) and the Senior Section (age 14–25). Girls are supported through postal newsletters, email, blog, phone calls and the opportunity to meet up at an annual gathering.

Additionally, Lone Guiding supports peer mentoring for girls working on various Awards and Qualifications, from interest badges to the Queen's Guide Award.

==== 1st Lone Company ====
1st Lone Company was established in 1912 by Agnes Baden-Powell. The Captain was Nesta G. Maude, the first Guide to earn the Silver Fish award. Members of this company lived in such diverse places as England, Scotland, Ireland, Wales, Cyprus, Poland and Belgium. They kept in contact by a postal newsletter. There were several patrols, including the Thistle patrol.

There is record of a camp at Eridge, taking tea with Agnes Baden-Powell at her house and visits to Guide Headquarters (at that time located at 116 Victoria Street in London) in the first few years of the company's existence.

=== United States of America – Girl Scouts of the USA ===
Lones in the USA are called Juliette Girl Scouts, so named after the founder of the Girl Scouts of the USA, Juliette Gordon Low. They were formerly known as Solo Girl Scouts. In the 1980s and 1990s, the term "Independent" was used.

In 2001, Stefanie Argus, an eighth-grade student, created Juliettes, an official designation for independent Girl Scouts, as her Silver Award Project. "I wanted to create something to tell other girls who left their troops they belong to the Girl Scouts," Argus said.

In 2003, nearly 2% of Girl Scouts were Juliettes.

== See also ==
- Lone Scouts
- Deep Sea Scouts
