= Women's Emergency Corps =

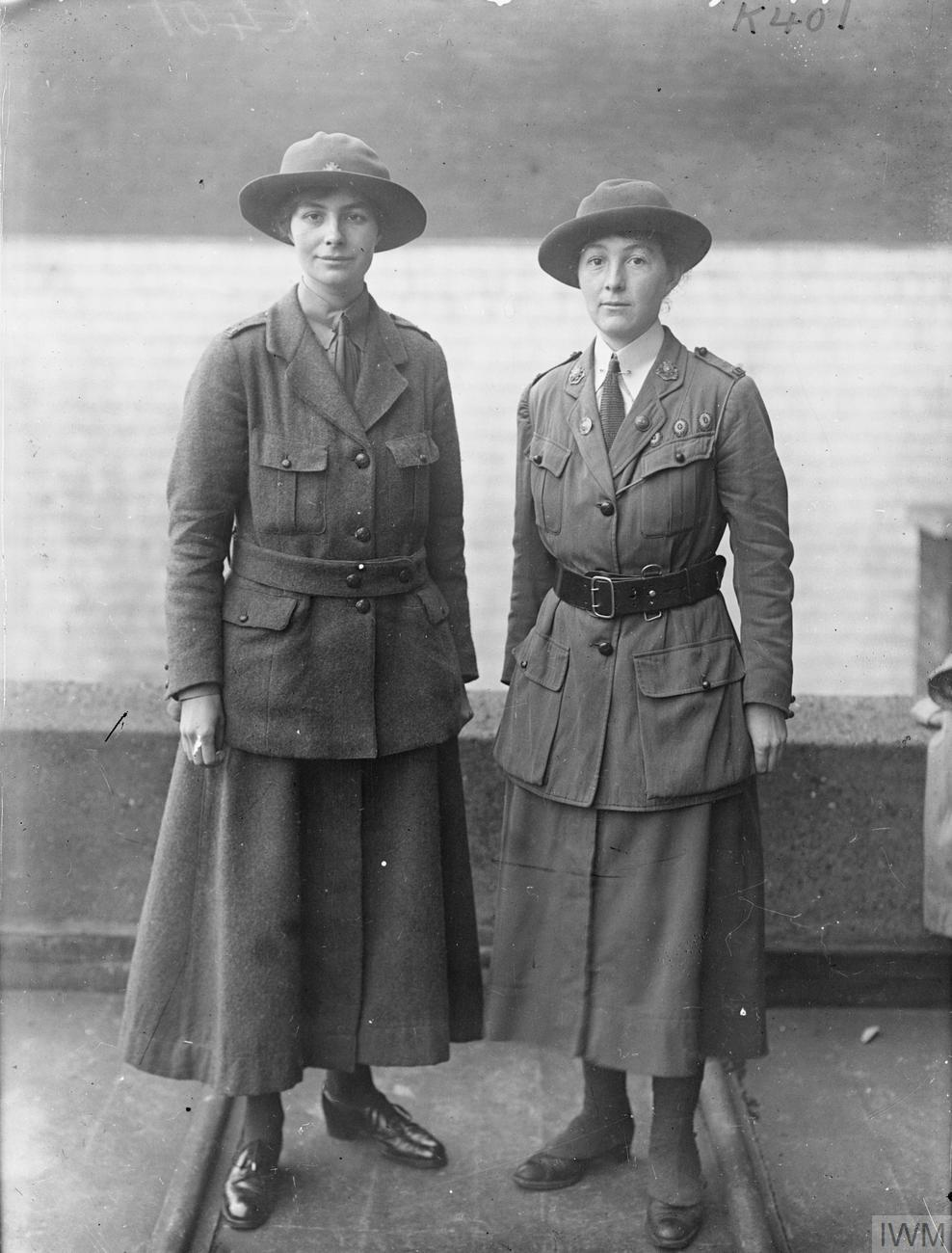
An officer and a private of the Women's Volunteer Reserve (December 1917)

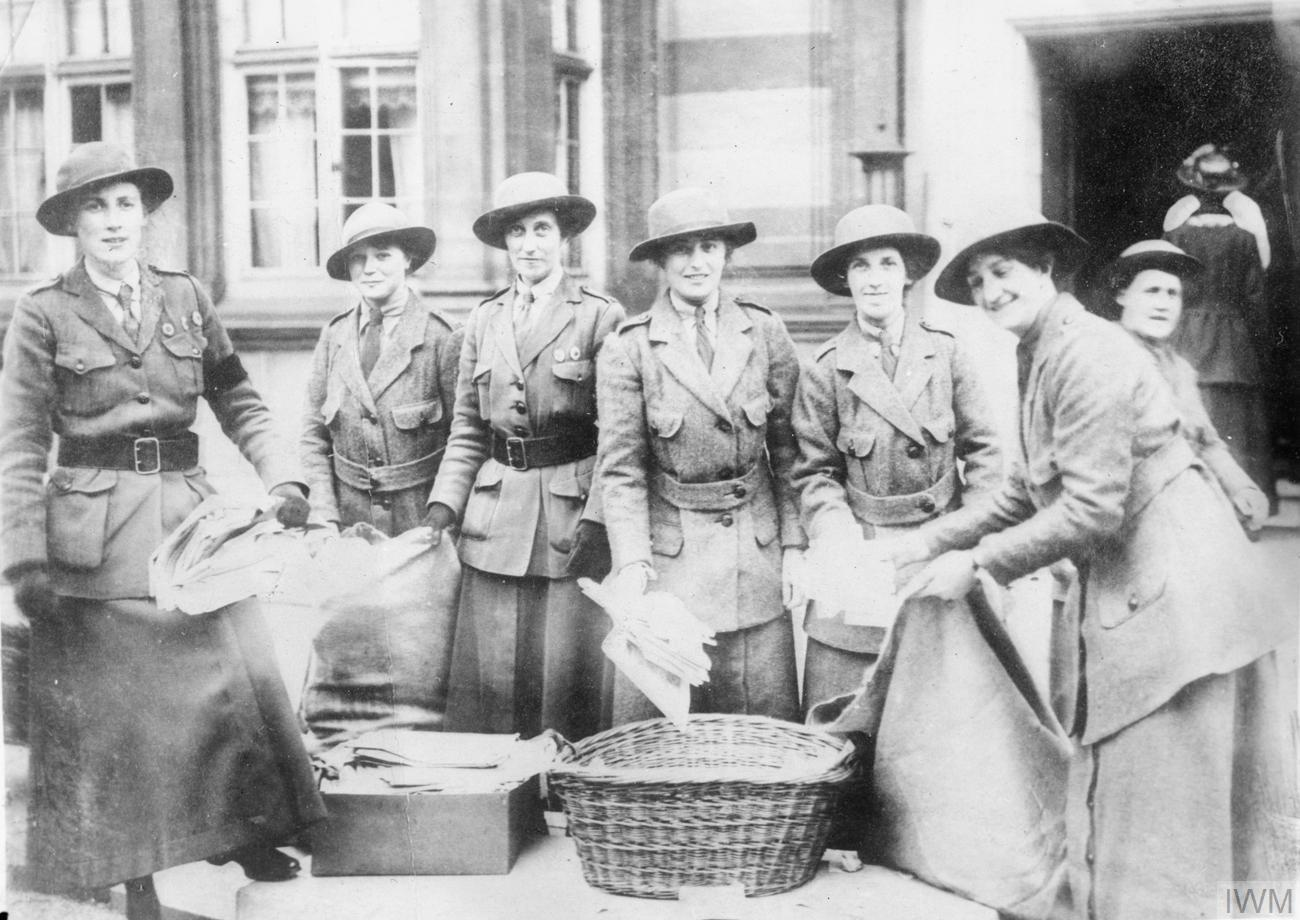
Members of the Women's Volunteer Reserve collecting waste paper, c. 1915

The Women's Emergency Corps (WEC) was a service organization founded in 1914 by Evelina Haverfield, Decima Moore, and the Women's Social and Political Union. The organization's goal was to contribute to the war effort of the United Kingdom in World War I by training female doctors, nurses and motorcycle messengers. This organization was quickly formed, just two days after the start of the war and worked alongside other women's organizations. Some of the societies they collaborated with were the Soldiers' and Sailors' Families Association, the Children's Care Committees, and the Women's League of Service.

The WEC had many different departments dedicated to supporting women and the war effort. The Kitchen Department served roughly 28,378 meals over four months and for the Christmas of 1914 they served Plum Pudding. The National Guild of Housecraft provided housekeeping lessons to unemployed women and girls so that they could find employment. The WEC also had an Interpreting Department which helped Belgian refugees find housing and integrate into the new community when they arrived by trains and boats.

The WEC along with other military style women's organizations received controversy because of its uniforms. It was thought that these women were attempting to imitate soldiers and taking over traditionally masculine roles by wearing khaki, a color associated with men fighting on the battlefield. The women of the Emergency Corps responded by arguing that their uniforms showed patriotism and their dedication to service. They also believed the uniforms helped remove visible class markers between the women, creating a sense of unity within the organizations.

Evelina Haverfield, one of the founders, also founded the Women’s Voluntary Reserve Ambulance Corps, where she became commander in chief. Through the Women’s Emergency Corps, she volunteered with Scottish Women’s Hospitals where she went to Serbia to care for wounded soldiers.

Mona Chalmers Watson became the Women's Emergency Corps honorary secretary. The Corps later evolved into the Women's Volunteer Reserve. The suffragist, Winifred Adair Roberts, was in the Reserve throughout World War I. She spoke to the historian, Brian Harrison, about her experiences as part of the Suffrage Interviews project titled Oral evidence on the Suffragette and Suffragist Movements: The Brian Harrison Interviews.

== See also ==
- Women's Reserve Ambulance Corps
- Canary girls
- Victory garden
- Women's Land Army (World War I)
- Women's Royal Air Force (World War I)
