= Britannia Park (Girl Guides Victoria) =

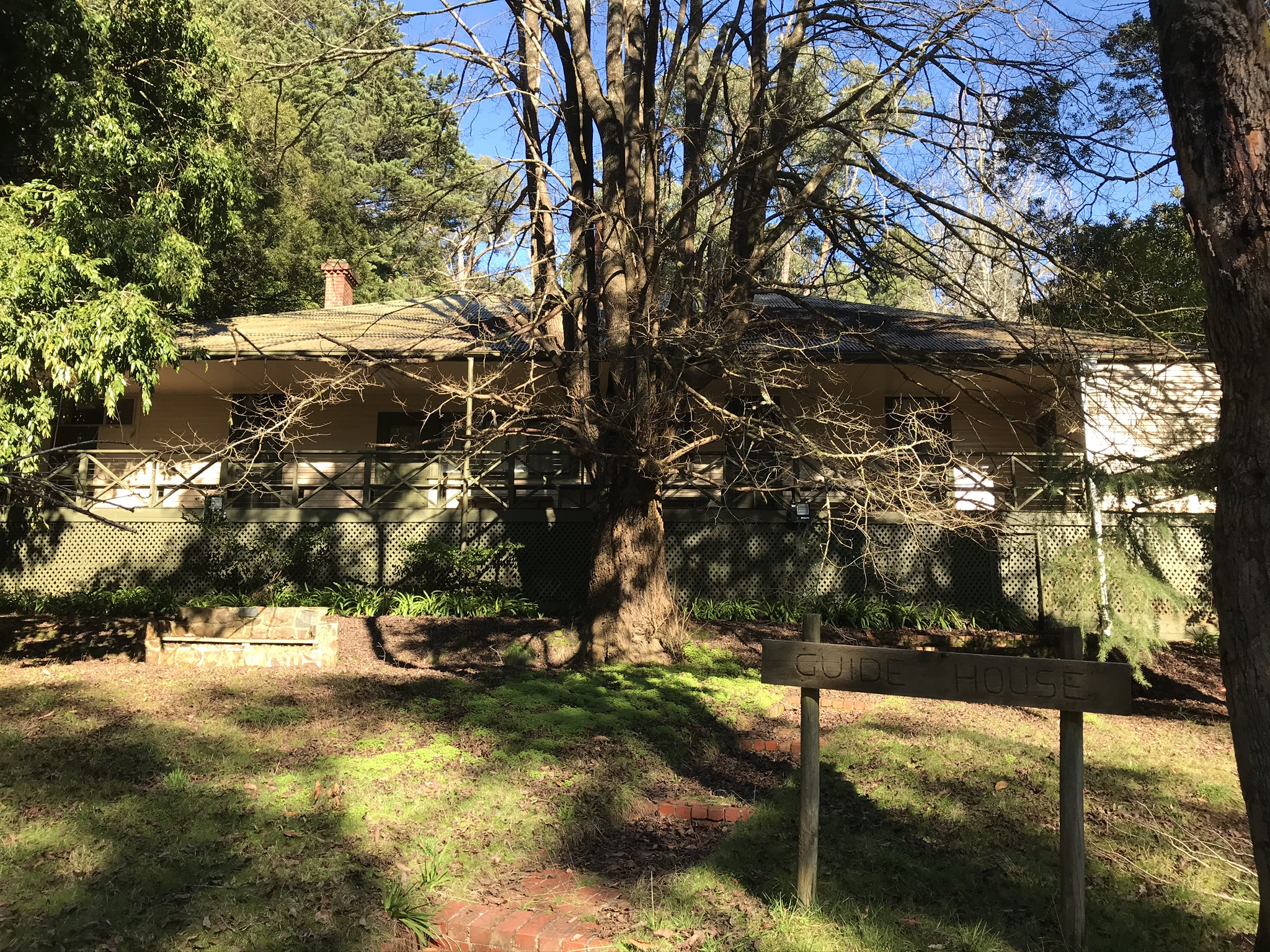
Britannia Guide Camp - Guide House Front - 2020

Britannia Park is a campsite belonging to Girl Guides Victoria. It is located near Yarra Junction in Victoria, Australia. It is 72 km east of Melbourne. The site covers 42 acres (approx 10 hectares), although the original purchase was smaller.

The site had originally been part of the Britannia Creek Wood Distillation Plant.

Fundraising to buy the site began in 1934 and continued until 1938. Helen Storrow contributed £100. A competition was held for a typically Australian round, to be sold to raise funds. The winning song, Kookaburra, by Marion Sinclair, was sung at the 1934 Scout Jamboree in the presence of Lord and Lady Baden-Powell.

The opening ceremony was planned to be held in January 1939, with Lord Hampton representing Lord Baden-Powell, the founder of Guiding worldwide. Bushfires in Victoria made this impossible, and the event was rescheduled for September 1939. The outbreak of World War II forced the cancellation of the ceremony entirely. Despite this, the first camps on the site were held in 1939. A large fête called 'Walkabout' had been planned to be held in the Melbourne Town Hall in the same year to raise money for the camp. The fête was held as planned, but the money raised (£1,000) was given to the Red Cross and to the Guide War Work for British evacuee children.

== Name ==
At the time of purchase, the property was known as "Britannia House". For many years after, both the house and the wider property were called simply "Guide House". In 1965, it was decided that this was too confusing. After much consideration, the name "Britannia Park" was chosen, incorporating the initials of the Founder and the old name of the property. The house is still called "Guide House"

== Facilities ==
Guide House sleeps twenty-eight people. The Camberwell Room is the main living room in Guide House and is named after the Camberwell District who originally gave the money to furnish it. A blanket made from the wool of a Confederate soldier's uniform, donated by Helen Storrow, hangs in the Camberwell Room. There are several other smaller buildings that to accommodate other groups sizes and for some memorabilia kept on site.

== Events ==
=== Southern Cross ===
Southern Cross was an international camp held here in 1970.

=== State Camps ===
State Camps were held approximately every three years during the January school holidays. At some time this was changed (possibly due to water restrictions and bush fire danger) to be held in the September School Holidays.

- 1964, State Camp 'Tartandi'
- 1967.
- 1970
- 1973 : 'Wirake'
- 1976
- 1979
- 1982, 'Alterama'
- 1987, 'Milpara'.
- 2007 'Tikana' was held, commemorating 100 years since Baden-Powell's initial Brownsea Island Scout camp in 1907
- 2010 'ACE' camp transferred to Geelong due to fire risk during the January school holidays.

=== Australian Centenary Event ===
The Australian Centenary Event (ACE), an international camp, was to be held at Britannia Park in January 2010. Due to increased potential fire risk at Britannia Park during the summer months, it was relocated by the organising committee to the Marcus Oldham College in Geelong.
