= HMS Greyhound =

Sixteen different ships of the British Royal Navy have been named HMS Greyhound, after the greyhound, a breed of dog notable for its speed.

- English ship Greyhound (1545) was a 45-gun ship built in 1545, rebuilt 1558, and wrecked 1563
- Greyhound was a ship in service in 1585
- English ship Greyhound (1636) was a 12-gun ship launched in 1636 and blown up 1656 in action with the Spanish
- English ship Greyhound (1657) was a 20-gun ship captured from the Royalists in 1657 and used as a fire ship in 1666
- English ship Greyhound (1672) was a 16-gun sixth rate in service from 1672 to 1698
- HMS Greyhound (1694) was a 6-gun bomb vessel purchased in 1694 and sold 1698
- HMS Greyhound (1703) was a 42-gun fifth rate launched at Ipswich in 1703 and wrecked off Teignmouth (or Tynemouth?) August 1711
- HMS Greyhound (1712) was a 20-gun sixth rate launched in 1712 and captured by the Spanish in 1718
- HMS Greyhound (1719) was a 20-gun sixth rate launched in 1719, in Spanish hands from April 1722 for one day, recaptured that evening, and broken up 1741, the specifications of the ship are detailed here.
- HMS Greyhound (1741) was a 20-gun sixth rate in service from 1741 to 1768
- HMS Greyhound (1763) was a 15-gun cutter purchased in 1763, hulked in 1776, and sold 1780
- HMS Greyhound (1773) was a 28-gun sixth rate launched in 1773 and wrecked 1780
- HMS Greyhound (1780) was a 14-gun cutter purchased in 1780, renamed Viper in 1781, and sold in October 1809
- HMS Greyhound (1783) was a 32-gun fifth rate launched 1783 and wrecked 1808. Because Greyhound served in the navy's Egyptian campaign between 8 March 1801 and 2 September, her officers and crew qualified for the clasp "Egypt" to the Naval General Service Medal, which the Admiralty authorised in 1850 for all surviving claimants. (Note: A first-class share of the prize money awarded in April 1823 was worth £34 2s 4d; a fifth-class share, that of a seaman, was worth 3s 11½d. The amount was small as the total had to be shared between 79 vessels and the entire army contingent.)
- HMS Euphrates (1813) was laid down as Greyhound, but renamed before launching
- HMS Greyhound (1859) was a Greyhound-class sloop launched in 1859, reduced to harbour service in 1869, and sold 1906
- HMS Greyhound (1900) was a Greyhound-class destroyer in service from 1900 to 1919
- HMS Greyhound (H05) was a G-class destroyer launched in 1935 and sunk by German dive bombers in 1941
- HMS Greyhound was to be a G-class destroyer, ordered in 1944 but cancelled in December 1945

== See also ==
- At least one revenue cutter Greyhound
- The armed cutter Greyhound of 12 guns, hired from 10 August 1798 to 13 February 1799
- English ship Flying Greyhound (1665), a 24-gun ship captured in 1665 and sold in 1667.
