= Mermaid-class destroyer =

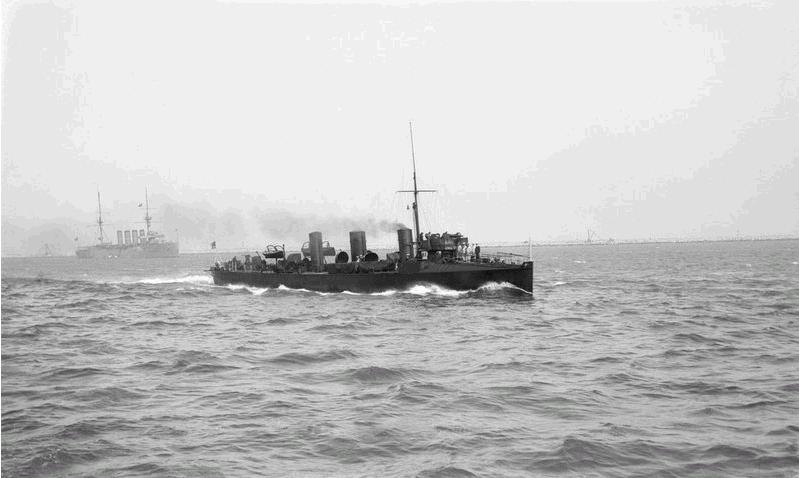
- The visually identical Greyhound underway in 1906

Class overview
- Name: Mermaid class
- Operators: Royal Navy
- Built: 1896–1898
- In commission: 1897–1919
- Completed: 2
- Lost: 1
- Scrapped: 1

General characteristics
- Type: Destroyer
- Displacement: 385 long tons (391 t) light; 430 long tons (437 t) full load
- Length: 214 ft 6 in (65.38 m) overall
- Beam: 21 ft 1 in (6.43 m)
- Draught: 13 ft (4.0 m)
- Propulsion: 2 shaft reciprocating engines; 4 Thornycroft boilers; 6,100 shp (4,549 kW)
- Speed: 30 knots (56 km/h; 35 mph)
- Complement: 62
- Armament: 1 × QF 12 pounder 12 cwt gun; 2 × 18-inch (457 mm) torpedo tubes (2×1)

Two Mermaid-class destroyers served with the Royal Navy during the First World War. They were three-funnelled turtle-backed destroyers with the usual Hawthorn funnel tops. Built in 1896–1898, Mermaid and Cheerful were launched by R. & W. Hawthorn, Leslie & Company from their Hebburn-on-Tyne shipyard.

Their Thornycroft boilers produced 6,100 hp to given them the required 30 knots (56 km/h) and they were armed with the standard 12-pounder gun and two torpedo tubes. They carried a complement of 63 officers and men. In 1913 the pair - like all other surviving three-funnelled destroyers of the "30-knotter" group - were reclassed as C-class destroyers. The almost identical Greyhound-class ships built subsequently at the same yard differed only by having Yarrow boilers.
