= Greyhound-class destroyer =

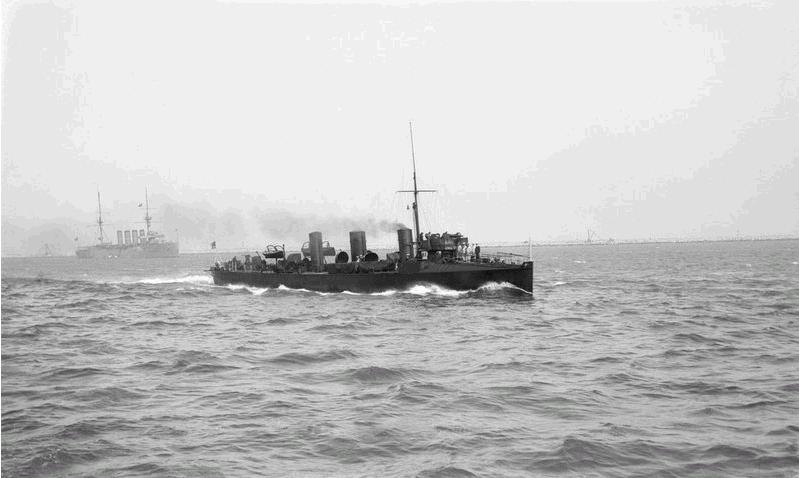
- Greyhound underway at Portland in 1906

Class overview
- Name: Greyhound
- Builders: Hawthorn Leslie, Hebburn
- Operators: Royal Navy
- Preceded by: Mermaid class
- Built: 1899–1902
- In commission: 1902–1920
- Completed: 3
- Scrapped: 3

General characteristics
- Type: Destroyer
- Displacement: 385 long tons (391 t) light; 430 long tons (437 t) full load
- Length: 214 ft 6 in (65.38 m) overall
- Beam: 21 ft 1 in (6.43 m)
- Draught: 13 ft (4.0 m)
- Installed power: 6,100 shp (4,549 kW)
- Propulsion: 4 × Yarrow boilers; 2 × vertical triple-expansion steam engines; 2 shafts
- Speed: 30 knots (56 km/h; 35 mph)
- Complement: 62
- Armament: 1 × QF 12 pounder 12 cwt gun; 5 × 2-pounder guns (2 × 1); 2 × 18 inch (450 mm) torpedo tubes (2 × 1)

Three Greyhound-class destroyers served with the Royal Navy during the First World War. Built in 1899–1902, Greyhound, Racehorse and Roebuck were three-funnelled turtle-backed destroyers, with the usual Hawthorn funnel tops, built by R. & W. Hawthorn, Leslie & Company at their Hebburn-on-Tyne shipyard.

They were virtually identical to the Mermaid-class destroyer built a couple of years earlier by the same company, except that they used a different type of water-tube boiler; Yarrow rather than Thornycroft. These four boilers produced 6,100 hp to given them the required thirty knots and they were armed with the standard 12-pounder guns and two torpedo tubes. They carried a complement of 63 officers and men. In 1913 the three - like all other surviving three-funnelled destroyers of the "30-knotter" group - were re-classed as C-class destroyers.
