= Stanley Venn Ellis =

Royal Navy officer (1875–1916)

Captain Stanley Venn Ellis
- Captain Ellis
- Born: 8 August 1875; Chellington, Bedfordshire, England, United Kingdom
- Died: 31 May 1916 (aged 40); HMS Defence, North Sea, off Jutland
- Relatives: Robert Beaven (father-in-law); Sherman Gordon Venn Ellis (brother); Sir William Charles Ellis (great grandfather); Captain William Ellis (4× great-granduncle)
- Military career
- Allegiance: United Kingdom
- Branch: Royal Navy
- Service years: 1889–1916
- Rank: Captain
- Commands: HMS Foam; HMS Stag; HMS Dasher; HMS Roebuck; HMS Ness; HMS Defence
- Conflicts: First World War: Raid on Scarborough; Battle of Jutland †
- Awards: The Imperial Order of Saint Stanislaus; Mentioned in dispatches

Captain Stanley Venn Ellis (8 August 1875 – 31 May 1916) was a senior Royal Navy officer. He was in command of HMS Defence, the flagship of Rear Admiral Sir Robert Arbuthnot at the Battle of Jutland, and was killed in action alongside the Admiral when she exploded and sank with the loss of all hands after her magazine was hit by a German salvo.

== Early life and career ==
Arms of Ellis of Kiddal Hall

Ellis was the son of a clergyman Reverend Henry Venn Ellis, rector of Alderton, Suffolk and a descendant of the Ellis family of Kiddal Hall (an old Yorkshire gentry family from which the Earls of Normanton and Viscounts Clifden, as well as the supposed inventor of Rugby William Webb Ellis and Sir William Ellis Secretary of State in exile to James II of England also descended from). The Ellis family had a history of naval service and Venn Ellis's 4× great-granduncle William Ellis had also served as a captain in the Royal Navy. His brother Sherman Gordon Venn Ellis CIE, DSO was a lieutenant colonel in the British Indian Army.

Ellis joined HMS Britannia as a cadet in 1889. On 22 June 1893, whilst serving on board the battleship HMS Nile, commanded by Captain Gerard Noel, he witnessed the collision and sinking of the flagship of the Mediterranean Fleet HMS Victoria, which caused the deaths of 358 crew including Vice-Admiral Sir George Tryon. The crew of the Nile managed to rescue 80 shipwrecked Victoria survivors. He was promoted to lieutenant on 1 October 1897. In 1900 whilst serving in Canada, he married Katheleen Beaven, daughter of Robert Beaven, Premier of British Columbia. Ellis was given command of the torpedo boat HMS Foam on 24 March 1902 and later that year took command of the HMS Stag on 1 November. From 3 January 1905 to 1 January 1906 he was captain of the destroyer HMS Dasher, and from 1 January 1906 to 28 May of that year the destroyer HMS Roebuck. From 28 May 1906 to 10 September 1909 he was captain of the destroyer HMS Ness. Whilst in command of the Ness he escorted King Edward VII and Queen Alexandra as they travelled on the Royal Yacht Victoria and Albert to Reval to meet Tsar Nicholas II on a state visit (9–11 June 1908) for which he was awarded a knighthood of the Imperial Order of Saint Stanislaus. The following year on 30 June 1909 he was promoted to the rank of commander and served on HMS Achilles, HMS Swiftsure, HMS Inflexible, HMS Albermale and in 1914 at the outbreak of the First World War he was transferred to the battleship HMS Monarch. Ellis was promoted to captain on 1 January 1916 and given command of the armoured cruiser HMS Defence, the flagship of Sir Robert Arbuthnot's 1st Cruiser Squadron. The vessels which made up Arbuthnot's squadron were considered to be of an outdated type.

== Death at the Battle of Jutland ==
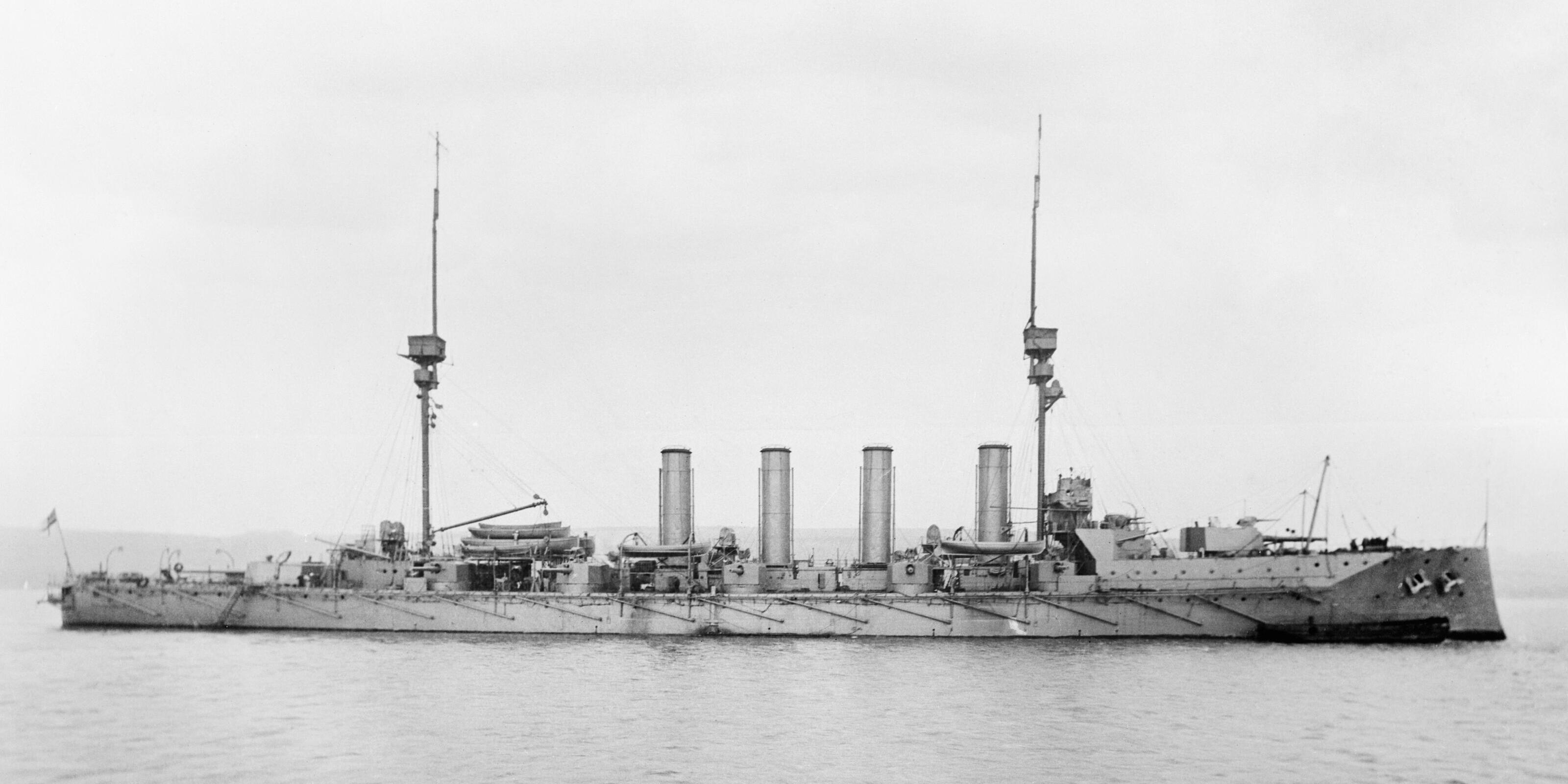
HMS Defence - the ship on which Captain Stanley Venn Ellis lost his life

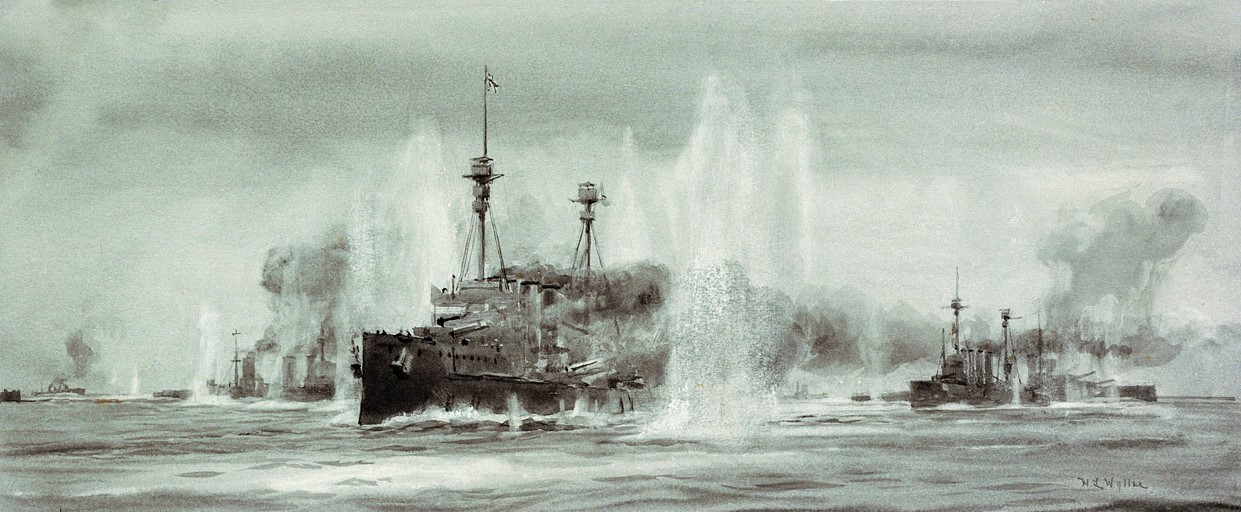
HMS Defence and HMS Warrior, passing the Battlecruiser Squadron at the Battle of Jutland, 31 May 1916

Arbuthnot's 1st Cruiser Squadron formed part of the Royal Navy's Grand Fleet which met the High Seas Fleet of the Imperial German Navy, the battle involved 250 warships, and, in terms of combined tonnage of vessels engaged, was the largest naval battle in history. Ellis captained the Defence throughout the battle, also aboard was Admiral Sir Robert Arbuthnot who commanded the 1st Cruiser Squadron from her.

During the battle Arbuthnot was attracted by the drifting hull of the crippled SMS Wiesbaden. With HMS Warrior, Defence closed in to finish off the incapacitated cruiser, only to come into range of Admiral Franz von Hipper's advanced battlecruisers and obstructing any covering fire from other Royal Navy vessels. Defence came under heavy fire from many German battleships and within minutes she was destroyed with all 903 hands in a massive magazine explosion after taking fire from SMS Lützow at close range. Of the 1st Cruiser Squadron's four cruisers (HMS Defence (flagship), HMS Warrior, HMS, Duke of Edinburgh & HMS Black Prince) only one (HMS Duke of Edinburgh) survived the battle. Captain Ellis was killed alongside the squadron's commander Admiral Sir Robert Arbuthnot and Captain Thomas Parry Bonham of HMS Black Prince. His body was never found and he is thusly commemorated on the Plymouth Naval Memorial.

== Personal life ==
Ellis was married to Katheleen Beaven, daughter of Robert Beaven, Premier of British Columbia with whom he had one daughter. After his death at the Battle of Jutland, she married Victor Alexander 'Peter' Spencer, 2nd Viscount Churchill.
