= Rose Kerr (Girl Guiding) =

British Guiding movement pioneer (1882–1944)

Rose Kerr OBE
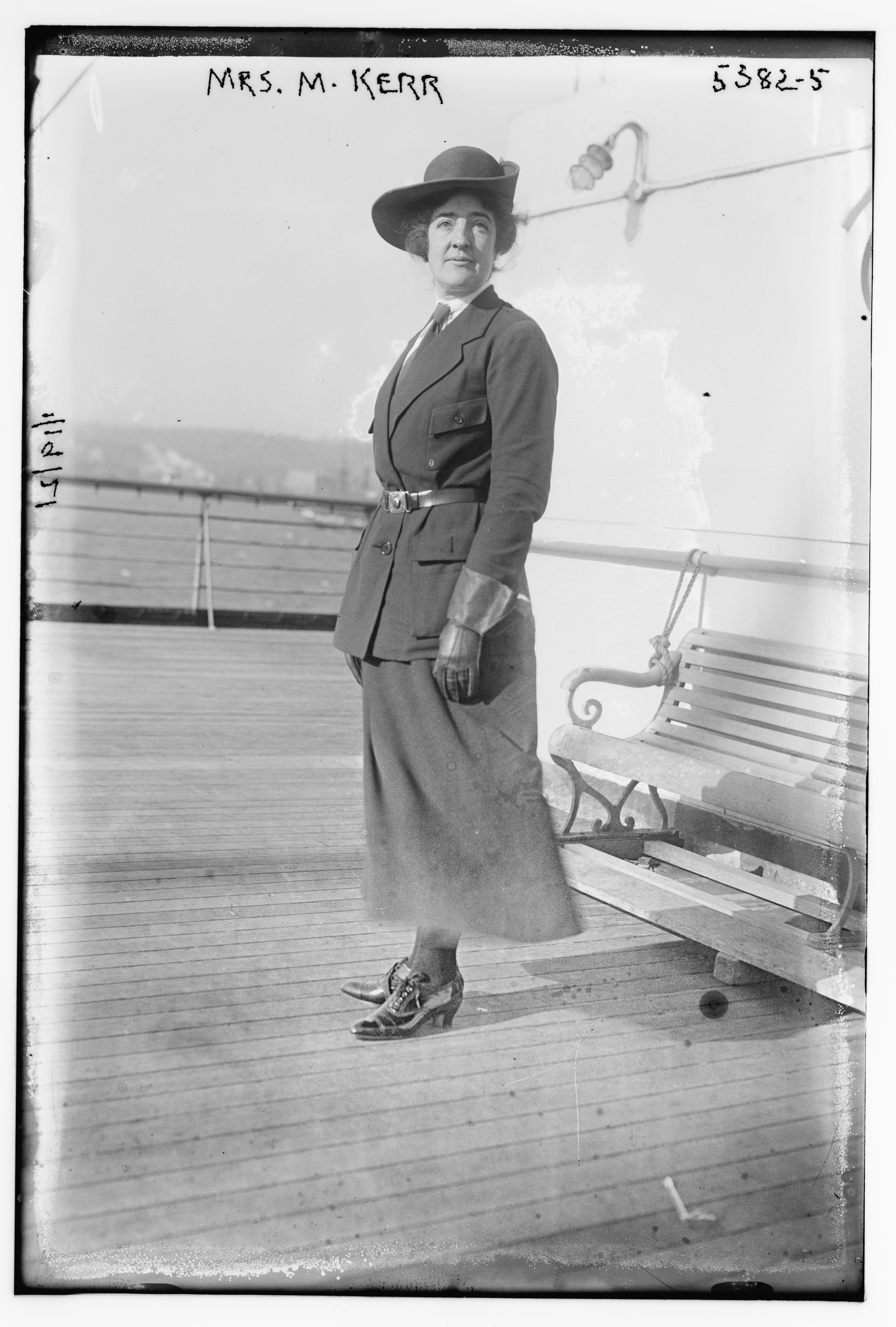
- Kerr circa 1915-1920
- Born: Rose Margaret Guthrie Gough; 28 April 1882; South Dublin, Ireland
- Died: 12 December 1944 (aged 62); Draycott Avenue, London
- Spouse: Mark Kerr
- Children: Alix Liddell; Louise Rosemary Kerr
- Parent(s): Major Wilfred Arbuthnot Gough; Beatrice Guthrie

Rose Margaret Guthrie Kerr OBE (née Gough; 28 April 1882 – 12 December 1944) was a British pioneer of the Guiding movement.

She was one of the founders of the Rangers section of Girl Guides and was involved in the formation of the World Association of Girl Guides and Girl Scouts (WAGGGS) and authored numerous publications on Guiding. She was awarded the Silver Fish. In 1938 she was made an O.B.E.

== Personal life ==
She was born in Dublin, the daughter of Major Wilfred Arbuthnot Gough and Beatrice Guthrie, daughter of the fourth Feudal Baron of Craigie. When she was 2, her father was killed in action at the Battle of Abu Klea, and her mother remarried Captain Henry Denison to whom she became quite devoted. She studied music in Dresden.

In 1906, Rose Gough married Admiral Mark Kerr (8 September 1864 – 20 January 1944), grandson of William Kerr, 6th Marquess of Lothian; they had two children: Alix Kerr Liddell (1907–1981) and Luise Rosemary Kerr (1908–1986).

Robert Baden-Powell proposed to Rose Gough first, but was refused in December 1905. However they remained close friends.

== Guiding ==
Juliette Gordon Low persuaded Kerr to lead a Guide company in 1912. According to the story, Juliette Low using her deafness failed to hear Rose Kerr's excuses that she didn't have time and didn't live in London. She gave up this company on going abroad in 1913 to Greece and later Italy. While staying at the Baden-Powell's home, Ewhurst Place, in 1916, Olave Baden-Powell insisted that Kerr become a County Commissioner for The Girl Guide Association. She started as Chief Commissioner for the County of London but later turned her attention to international Guiding also. She continued to lead her own Ranger company from that time on.

== World War II ==
During World War II, a message was smuggled to Kerr from Anni Collan, the Chief Guide of Finland. Collan wrote "It is a pity that our two countries are at war with one another - but that does not make any difference to us!"

Rose Kerr's daughter, Louise Rosemary "Rosie" Kerr, was a close friend of the pilot, Richard Hillary, and was reportedly engaged to the Squadron Leader, Jacques-Henri Schloesing until he was killed in action in 1944. Schloesing had been a Scout leader before the war, and the street where Passy Cemetery stands in Paris is named for him.

== Appointments ==
=== The Girl Guide Association ===
- Guider
- County Commissioner
- Member of the Executive Committee
- Head of Rangers
- Deputy Chief Commissioner, London and the Home Counties
- Vice-Chairman, International Council
- Commissioner for Publications
- (first) International Commissioner
- Chairman of subcommittee appointed by Robert Baden-Powell to consider the formation of a World Association

=== WAGGGS ===
- Chairman of First World Committee
- (first) Commissioner for Tenderfoot Countries
- Head of Publications
- Editor of The Council Fire

== Works ==
- 1929: The Commissioner's Book
- 1932: The Story of the Girl Guides
- 1934: The Cruise of the Calgaric
- 1935: The Cruise of the Adriatic
- 1938: The Cruise of the Orduna
- 1939: The Story Of A Million Girls - Guiding and Girl Scouting Round The World (Compiler)
- 1954: The Story of the Girl Guides: 1908- 1938 (Revised by Alix Liddell)

== See also ==
- Alice Behrens
- Helen Gwynne-Vaughan
