= HMS Roebuck (1901) =

Destroyer of the Royal Navy

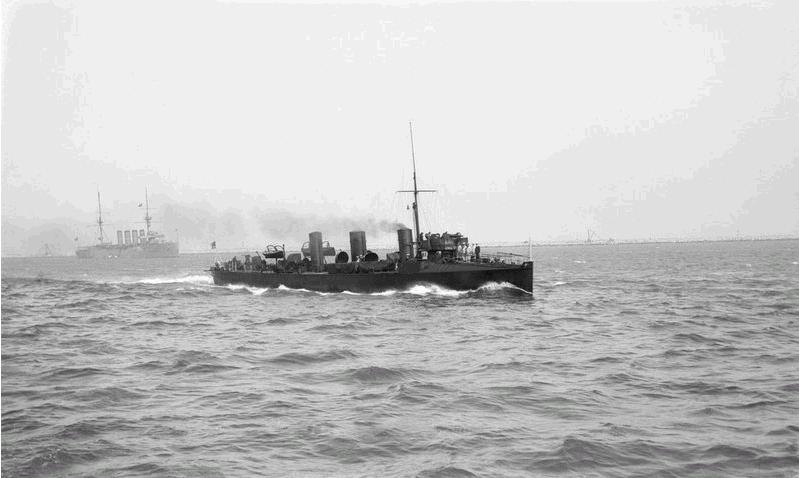
- Sister ship Greyhound underway in 1906

History

United Kingdom
- Name: HMS Roebuck
- Ordered: 1898 – 1899 Naval Estimates
- Builder: R.W. Hawthorn Leslie and Company, Hebburn-on-Tyne
- Laid down: 2 October 1899
- Launched: 4 January 1901
- Commissioned: March 1902
- Out of service: Laid up, December 1918
- Fate: Broken up, 1919

General characteristics
- Class & type: Hawthorn Leslie three-funnel, 30-knot destroyer
- Displacement: 385 long tons (391 t) light; 430 long tons (437 t) full load
- Length: 214 ft 6 in (65.38 m) o/a
- Beam: 21 ft 1 in (6.43 m)
- Draught: 8 ft 7 in (2.62 m)
- Installed power: 6,100 ihp (4,500 kW)
- Propulsion: 4 × Yarrow boilers; 2 × vertical triple-expansion steam engines; 2 × shafts
- Speed: 30 kn (56 km/h; 35 mph)
- Range: 85 tons coal; 1,555 nmi (2,880 km) at 11 kn (20 km/h)
- Complement: 63 officers and men
- Armament: 1 × QF 12-pounder 12 cwt Mark I naval gun; 5 × QF 6-pounder 8 cwt naval gun; 2 × single tubes for 18 in (450 mm) torpedoes

HMS Roebuck was a Hawthorn Leslie three-funnel, 30-knot destroyer ordered by the Royal Navy under the 1898–1899 Naval Estimates. She was the twelfth ship to carry the name. She served during World War I and was broken up in 1919.

== Description and construction ==
On 30 March 1899, (Note: While the order was officially placed on 30 March, it has been suggested that they (and the other nine destroyers forming part of this programme) were ordered later, and that the March order date was an administrative subterfuge in order to ensure that they fell under the 1898–1899 financial year.) the British Admiralty ordered three destroyers (Roebuck, Greyhound and Racehorse) from the Newcastle shipbuilder Hawthorn Leslie, as part of the 1898–1899 shipbuilding programme.

The three ships closely resembled the two thirty-knotter destroyers, Cheerful and Mermaid built by Hawthorn Leslie under the 1896–1897 programme. They were 214 feet 6 inches (65.38 m) long overall and 210 ft 11 in (64.29 m) between perpendiculars, with a beam of 21 ft 1 in (6.43 m) and a draught of 8 ft 7 in (2.62 m). Displacement was 385 long tons (391 t) light and 430 long tons (440 t) full load. Four Yarrow boilers (in place of the Thornycroft boilers used by Cheerful and Mermaid) fed steam to two three-cylinder triple expansion steam engines, rated at 6,100 indicated horsepower (4,500 kW). Up to 85 long tons (86 t) of coal could be carried, giving a range of 1,555 nautical miles (2,880 km; 1,789 mi) at 11 knots (20 km/h; 13 mph). The ship had the standard armament of the Thirty-Knotters, i.e. a QF 12-pounder 12 cwt (3 in (76 mm) calibre) gun on a platform on the ship's conning tower (in practice the platform was also used as the ship's bridge), with a secondary armament of five 6-pounder guns, and two 18-inch (460 mm) torpedo tubes. The ship was manned by 63 officers and ratings.

Roebuck was laid down on 2 October 1899 at Hawthorn Leslie's Hebburn-on-Tyne shipyard and launched on 4 January 1901. She arrived at Chatham Dockyard 18 September 1901 to be armed and prepared for sea trials, during which she reached a speed of 30.346 knots (56.201 km/h; 34.922 mph). She was completed and accepted by the Royal Navy in March 1902.

== Service history ==
After commissioning she was assigned to the Channel Fleet. She spent her operational career mainly in home waters. In May 1902 she received the officers and men from HMS Greyhound, and was commissioned by Commander Marcus Rowley Hill at Chatham for service with the Medway Instructional Flotilla. She took part in the fleet review held at Spithead on 16 August 1902 for the coronation of King Edward VII. In August 1906, Roebuck, part of the 3rd Destroyer Flotilla, was due to be refitted at Devonport Dockyard. In 1910, Roebuck, commanded by Andrew Cunningham, later Admiral of the Fleet and First Sea Lord, was part of the 4th Destroyer Flotilla based at Portsmouth.

On 30 August 1912 the Admiralty directed all destroyers were to be grouped into classes designated by letters based on contract speed and appearance. As a three-funneled destroyer with a contract speed of 30 knots, Roebuck was assigned to the C class. The class letters were painted on the hull below the bridge area and on a funnel.

July 1914 found her in the Portsmouth local flotilla tendered to HMS Pomone. She was deployed to Devonport under orders of the Commander in Chief, Portsmouth for the training of cadets until the Armistice.

By December 1918 she was paid off and laid-up in reserve awaiting disposal. She was broken up at Portsmouth Dockyard in 1919.

== Pennant numbers ==
Pennant number	From	To
D53	6 December 1914	1 September 1915
D67	1 September 1915	1 January 1918
D72	1 January 1918	1919

== Bibliography ==
- Chesneau, Roger & Kolesnik, Eugene M., eds. (1979). Conway's All The World's Fighting Ships 1860–1905. London: Conway Maritime Press. ISBN 0-85177-133-5.
- Colledge, J. J.; Warlow, Ben (2006) [1969]. Ships of the Royal Navy: The Complete Record of All Fighting Ships of the Royal Navy from the 15th Century to the Present (3rd Rev ed.). London: Chatham Publishing. ISBN 978-1-86176-281-8. OCLC 67375475.
- Dittmar, F. J. & Colledge, J. J. (1972). British Warships 1914–1919. Shepperton, UK: Ian Allan. ISBN 0-7110-0380-7.
- Friedman, Norman (2009). British Destroyers: From Earliest Days to the Second World War. Barnsley, UK: Seaforth Publishing. ISBN 978-1-84832-049-9.
- Gardiner, Robert & Gray, Randal, eds. (1985). Conway's All The World's Fighting Ships 1906–1921. London: Conway Maritime Press. ISBN 0-85177-245-5.
- Jane, Fred T. (1969) [1898]. Jane's All the World's Fighting Ships 1898. New York: ARCO Publishing Company.
- Jane, Fred T. (1969) [1905]. Jane's Fighting Ships 1905. New York: ARCO Publishing Company. p. 77.
- Lyon, David (2001) [1996]. The First Destroyers. London: Caxton Editions. ISBN 1-84067-364-8.
- Manning, T. D. (1961). The British Destroyer. London: Putnam & Co. OCLC 6470051.
- March, Edgar J. (1966). British Destroyers: A History of Development, 1892–1953; Drawn by Admiralty Permission From Official Records & Returns, Ships' Covers & Building Plans. London: Seeley Service. OCLC 164893555.
- Moore, John (1990). Jane's Fighting Ships of World War I. Studio Editions. ISBN 1 85170 378 0.
