= Jacques Andrieux =

French fighter ace of the Second World War

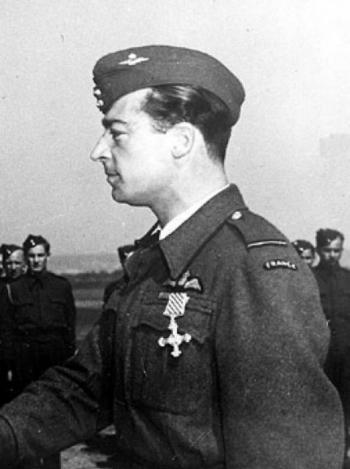
- Born: 15 August 1917; Lorient, France
- Died: 21 January 2005 (aged 87); Saint-Georges-de-Didonne
- Known for: Fighter ace

Jacques Andrieux (15 August 1917 – 21 January 2005) was a French general and fighter ace of the Second World War credited with 6 aerial victories, 4 'probables' and 2 damaged.

== Early life ==
Jacques Andrieux was the son of a military doctor, who was deported to Germany as a Résistant and died in captivity.

According to some sources, Andrieux joined the French air force as a non-commissioned officer in 1937. Others contend that he was simply a private pilot and was drafted in the air force at the beginning of the war.

At the time of the invasion of France, Andrieux was not an active pilot and did not take part in the fighting. Demobilised in August 1940, he fled on a fishing boat from Brittany to Great-Britain on 16 December 1940 and joined the Free French Air Force.

== Wartime service ==
Posted to Odiham as a trainee Sergeant pilot, after training he was assigned to No. 130 Squadron in September 1941, flying Spitfires. He achieved his first aerial victory by downing a Fw 190 near Cherbourg 28 February 1943.

Promoted to Lieutenant in 1943, he was posted to No. 91 Squadron in April 1943 and shot down three more German fighters with this unit.

In June 1944 he joined No. 341 Squadron, also known in French as Groupe de Chasse n° 3/2 "Alsace", with the rank of captain. On 26 August 1944 he took command of the unit when Jacques-Henri Schloesing was killed in combat. During this period he destroyed another two German fighters, thus becoming a fighter ace.

He ended the war with the rank of Wing Commander commanding 80 Operational Training Unit at RAF Ouston. His final claim total was 6 destroyed, 4 'probables' and 2 damaged.

== Postwar service ==
After the war, he continued a career in the French Air Force. He commanded a fighter training unit in Meknes, Morocco until 1950. He then took command of the 2e Escadre de Chasse in Dijon, France, and later of the 4e Brigade aérienne in Bremgarten, Germany.

He also commanded the 12e Escadre de Chasse in Cambrai in northern France.

He retired in 1970 with the rank of général de brigade aérienne and held various civilian positions.

He died on 21 January 2005 in Saint-Georges-de-Didonne where he was buried.

== Medals and awards ==
- Grand Croix of the French Legion of Honour
- Compagnon of the Order of Liberation
- Grand Croix of the Ordre national du Mérite
- Croix de Guerre 1939-45 with 13 citations
- Cross for Military Valour with two citations
- Aeronautical Medal
- Knight of the Order of Agricultural Merit
- Distinguished Flying Cross with Bar (UK)
- Silver Star (USA)

== Writings ==
- Jacques Andrieux, Le ciel et l'enfer, Presses de la Cité, 1965
- Jacques Andrieux, Une poignée d'as — France-Libre 1940-1945, Presses de la Cité, 1976

== Bibliography ==
- Thierry Le Roy, Les Bretons et l'aéronautique des origines à 1939, Presses universitaires de Rennes, 2002.
