= Alix Liddell =

British writer (1907–1981)

Alix Kerr Liddell OBE
- Liddell from a 1970 newspaper
- Born: 10 May 1907; Pimlico, London
- Died: 6 July 1981; London, England
- Occupations: Girl Guides leader; writer
- Spouse: Maurice Liddell (1937–1976; his death)
- Children: Virginia Sarah Alix Ashton; Judith Rose Jackson
- Parent(s): Rose Kerr; Mark Kerr

Alix Kerr Liddell OBE (10 May 1907 – 6 July 1981) was a British writer who contributed to the Guiding and Girl Scouting movement both in the United Kingdom and internationally. She wrote several books on the history of Guiding.

== Family ==
Alix Liddell was the daughter of Rose Kerr, a pioneer of Girl Guiding, and Admiral Mark Kerr, British Navy. Her great-grandfather was the 6th Marquess of Lothian. On 28 July 1937 she married Maurice Arthur Liddell, OBE (1905–1976). They had two children.

== Guiding and Scouting ==
The Kerr family were personal friends of Olave and Robert Baden-Powell and Liddell's mother was heavily involved in Guiding. Liddell began her life in Guiding as a Brownie. She attended the first International Camp in Normandy in 1922. Later she became both a Guider and a Commissioner.

She held numerous positions at national level within UK Guiding including Chairman of Publications Committee, International Commissioner and member of the Education Panel. She attended nine of the ten World Conferences between 1950 and 1975.

Liddell produced numerous books on Guiding, including several on the history of the movement. She was editor of The Council Fire, a World Association of Girl Guides and Girl Scouts (WAGGGS) publication, for nearly 30 years. Liddell was awarded the Silver Fish in 1960.

== Works ==
- 1948: International Notebook – Europe
- 1954: Story of the Girl Guides: 1908–1938 (Revised by Liddell)
- 1957: The True Book about Girl Guides
- 1960: The First Fifty Years
- (1965?): The Story of Our Chalet, Olave House, Our Cabaña (with Ida von Herrenschwand and Ethel Rusk Dermady)
- 1970: The Girl Guides, 1910–1970
- (1976?): Briefly it's Guides
- 1976: Story of the Girl Guides: 1938 – 1975

== See also ==
- Elizabeth Hartley
