= Mark Kerr (Royal Navy officer, born 1864) =

Royal Navy Admiral and Royal Air Force Major-General (1864–1944)

Admiral Mark Kerr CB CVO
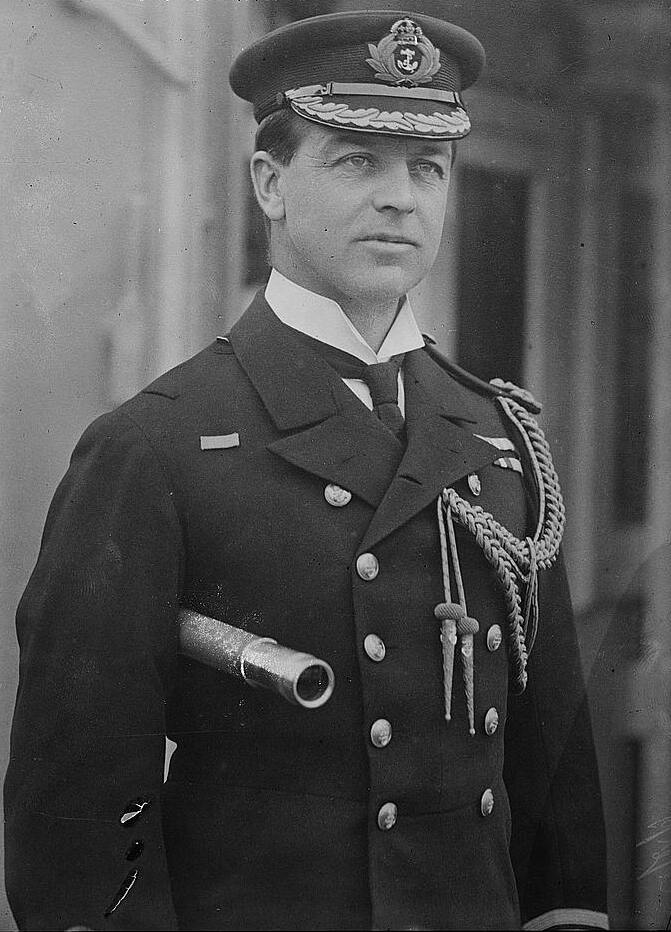
- Kerr in 1916
- Born: 26 September 1864
- Died: 10 January 1944 (aged 79)
- Military career
- Allegiance: United Kingdom
- Branch: Royal Navy (1877–1918); Royal Air Force (1918)
- Service years: 1877–1918
- Rank: Admiral (RN); Major General (RAF)
- Commands: South-Western Area (1918); Adriatic Squadron (1916–17); Royal Hellenic Navy (1913–15); HMS Hercules (1911, 1913); HMS King George V (1912–13); HMS Invincible (1908–11); HMS Implacable (1907–08); HMS Drake (1905–07); HMS Mermaid (1899–1901); HMS Bittern (1899)
- Conflicts: Anglo-Egyptian War; Mahdist War; First World War
- Awards: Companion of the Order of the Bath; Commander of the Royal Victorian Order; Commander of the Order of the Redeemer (Greece); Grand Officer of the Order of Saints Maurice and Lazarus (Italy); Officer of the Military Order of Savoy (Italy)
- Other work: Writer

Admiral Mark Edward Frederic Kerr, CB, CVO (26 September 1864 – 10 January 1944) was a Royal Navy and Royal Air Force officer during the First World War. Kerr was the Commander-in-Chief of the Royal Hellenic Navy in the early part of the First World War, Commander-in-Chief of the British Adriatic Squadron in 1916 and 1917 and was involved in the work to create the Royal Air Force in late 1917 and early 1918. In 1919, Kerr was in Harbour Grace, Newfoundland, to lead an expedition in an attempt to cross the Atlantic in a four-motor Handley Page bomber. However, the plans were changed to make a friendship flight to New York and when competitors made the flight before he and his crew could attempt.

== Early life ==
Mark Edward Frederic Kerr was born on 26 September 1864, son of the Admiral Lord Frederic Kerr (1818–1896) and Emily Sophia Maitland, daughter of General Sir Peregrine Maitland. His father was the youngest son of William Kerr, 6th Marquess of Lothian and his second wife, Lady Harriet Scott, daughter of the Duke of Buccleuch. His cousin was the politician John Kerr, 7th Marquess of Lothian.

== Naval career ==
Kerr joined the Royal Navy in 1877 following education at Stubbington House School. He served in the Naval Brigade during the Egyptian War of 1882 and in Sudan in 1891. From April 1899 he held a series of commands on ships serving in the Medway Instructional Flotilla. After initial command of the destroyer HMS Bittern, he was appointed to the destroyer HMS Mermaid in November 1899, then transferred to the torpedo boat destroyer HMS Cheerful in March 1900. He was promoted to captain on 1 January 1903, and appointed Naval Attache in Italy, Austria, Turkey and Greece later the same year. In 1913, he succeeded Vice Admiral Lionel Grant Tufnell as head of the British Naval Mission to Greece, and as Commander-in-Chief of the Royal Hellenic Navy, a post he retained until 1915. As commander of the Greek Navy at the outbreak of the First World War, Kerr helped keep Greece out of the war. In 1914, while on leave from his duties as head of the Greek Navy, Kerr learned to fly, making him the first British flag officer to become a pilot. He was awarded his Aviator's Certificate no. 842 on 16 July 1914.

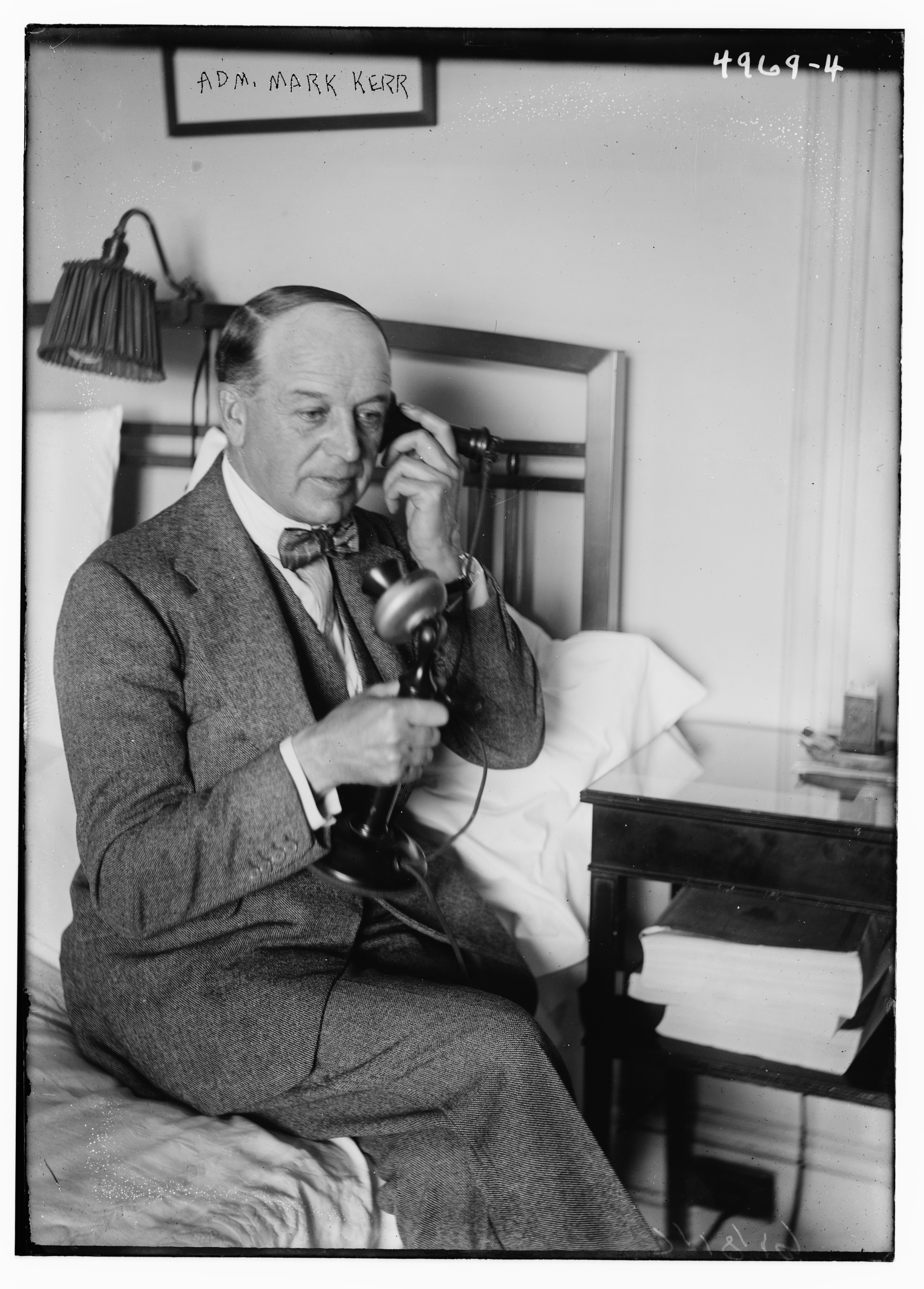
Kerr, c. 1915

In May 1916 Kerr was appointed Commander-in-Chief of the British Adriatic Squadron which meant that he was unavailable to the Committee which was investigating the Dardanelles failure. Kerr returned to Great Britain in August 1917 and the Admiralty seconded him to the Air Board to assist in the formation of the Air Ministry and the Royal Air Force. In late 1917, when the Government were considering the recommendations of the Smuts Report, Kerr intervened in its favour. His "bombshell memorandum" correctly identified a new heavy bomber that the Germans had just brought into service, although the memorandum overstated its payload capability. Additionally, using information Kerr had gained from Italian sources, Kerr stated that the Germans were developing a fleet of 4,000 heavy bombers and would soon be able to destroy large areas of South-East England. To counter this threat, Kerr urged the creation of a bomber force consisting of no fewer than 2,000 aircraft which would be under the authority of an air ministry with its own executive powers.

Kerr was granted the rank of major general and served as Deputy Chief of the Air Staff at the Air Ministry in the months before the RAF came into being. By Kerr's own testimony he found himself in disagreement on several matters of strategy with Sir Hugh Trenchard, the Chief of the Air Staff and on 1 April 1918, when the Royal Naval Air Service and the Royal Flying Corps were merged to form the RAF, Kerr left the Air Council and was appointed General Officer Commanding No. 2 Area with his headquarters at Chafyn Grove School in the Wiltshire city of Salisbury. In May 1918, with a renaming of the RAF's areas, Kerr was redesignated General Officer Commanding South Western Area. He retired from the RAF in October 1918. He later became a writer, dying at the age of 79 in 1944.

== Family ==
Kerr married Rose Margaret Gough (1882–1944) on 10 July 1906. Rose was later to become a pioneer of the Girl Guides. Mark and Rose Kerr had two daughters:

- Alix Liddell (b. 10 May 1907 – d. 1981)
- Louise Rosemary Kerr (b. 22 November 1908 – d.1986)

Mark and Rose Kerr both died in 1944.

== Bibliography ==
=== Nonfiction ===
- Flygning i fred och krig (Flight in Peace and War). Stockholm: Svensk Motortidnings. 1922.
- Land, Sea and Air. London: Longmans, Green. 1927.
- The Sailor's Nelson. London: Hurst & Blackett. 1932.
- The Navy in My Time. London: Rich & Cowan. 1933.
- Prince Louis of Battenberg: Admiral of the Fleet. London: Longmans. 1934.

=== Poetry ===
- The Destroyer and A Cargo of Notions. London: privately published (Hatchards, Piccadilly). 1909.
- Nelson: A Poem. Portsmouth: Gale & Polden. 1910.
- The Rubaiyat of Kram Rerk. London: Longmans. 1927.

== Footnotes ==
Military offices
Preceded by George Patey	Captain of HMS Implacable; 1907–1908	Succeeded by Henry Tottenham
New title Air council established	Deputy Chief of the Air Staff; January–March 1918	Succeeded by Robert Groves
New title Area established	General Officer Commanding No. 2 Area; Renamed South-Western Area on 8 May 1918; April–October 1918	Succeeded by Philip Game
