= William Ellis (Royal Navy officer) =

Captain William Ellis
- Born: 1697 or 1698; Barwick-in-Elmet, Yorkshire, Kingdom of England
- Died: 12 August 1743 (aged 45–46); New York City, Province of New York
- Relatives: Sir William Lowther (great grandfather); Captain Stanley Venn Ellis (4× great-grandnephew)
- Military career
- Allegiance: United Kingdom
- Branch: Royal Navy
- Service years: 1711—1743
- Rank: Captain
- Commands: HMS Gosport

Captain William Ellis (1697 or 1698 — 12 August 1743) was a senior Royal Navy officer. He commanded HMS Gosport from 1740 until shortly before his death in 1743.

== Early life and career ==
Arms of Ellis of Kiddal Hall

Ellis was born a member of an old Yorkshire gentry family the Ellises of Kiddal Hall and was listed in Dugdale's visitation of Yorkshire as having been baptised on either the 2nd of February 1693 or 1694. However, he was said to have been in his 46th year at the time of his death in 1743, making it more likely that he was born in 1697 or 1698 (which would also mean he was 13 or 14 when he joined the Navy as a King's Letter Boy - which was the usual sort of age). His father, also William Ellis, served as High Sheriff of Yorkshire from 1708 to 1709 and was the grandson of Sir William Lowther (also High Sheriff of Yorkshire, from 1681 to 1682) ancestor of the Earls of Lonsdale.

Ellis joined the Royal Navy as a King's Letter Boy (volunteer-per-order) in 1711 and served on HMS Centurion, becoming a Midshipman in 1714 and later briefly serving on HMS Cumberland between 1717 and 1718 before moving to HMS Grafton in June 1718, later taking part in the Battle of Cape Passaro. He was serving on the HMS Charles Galley when he passed the lieutenants exam in 1720. Ellis served as a lieutenant aboard; HMS Burford, HMS Grafton (where he had previously served) and HMS Cornwall.

Ellis was promoted to captain in 1740 and was the first captain of the 44 gun HMS Gosport a ship which Admiral of the Fleet John Jervis, 1st Earl of St Vincent later commanded. Ellis and the Gosport were involved in escorting convoys through the dangerous Caribbean waters, after one such assignment escorting the Saltertuda Fleet on 30 May 1743 the Gosport arrived at Sandy Hook (historically a convenient anchorage for ships before proceeding into Upper New York Harbor. It was noted that many of the hands were sick and were 'brought up hither in order for their recover' (taken to New York for medical assistance). Whilst in New York Ellis was removed from command and replaced as commander of the Gosport by a Captain Stourton who then continued on to Boston, arriving on July 14 Ellis's removal from command at this point and death only a short while later on 12 August 1743, as well as the production of a will in the days before his death suggests that he may well have succumbed to illness or disease himself.
