= Sherman Gordon Venn Ellis =

Lieutenant Colonel Sherman Gordon Venn Ellis CIE DSO
- Lieutenant-Colonel Venn Ellis
- Born: 20 February 1880; St Lawrence, Essex, England
- Died: 19 February 1937 (aged 56); Karnal, Punjab, British India
- Relatives: Stanley Venn Ellis (brother); Sir William Charles Ellis (great grandfather)
- Military career
- Allegiance: United Kingdom
- Branch: British Indian Army
- Service years: 1899–1937
- Rank: Lieutenant Colonel
- Conflicts: First World War
- Awards: Companion of the Order of the Indian Empire; Distinguished Service Order

Lieutenant Colonel Sherman Gordon Venn Ellis, CIE, DSO (1880–1937) was a British Indian Army officer, and colonial administrator who served as the Minister of Finance of the State of Patiala from 1936 until his death in 1937.

== Early life ==
Arms of Ellis of Kiddal Hall

Ellis was the son of a clergyman Reverend Henry Venn Ellis, rector of Alderton, Suffolk and a descendant of the Ellis family of Kiddal Hall (an old Yorkshire family from which the Earls of Normanton and Viscounts Clifden, as well as the supposed inventor of Rugby William Webb Ellis and Sir William Ellis Secretary of State in exile to James II of England also descended from). His elder brother Stanley Venn Ellis was a Royal Navy Captain who was one of the most senior officers killed at the Battle of Jutland when his ship HMS Defence sank.

== Career ==
Ellis joined the West India Regiment in 1899, transferring to the West African Regiment in 1900 before finally joining the British Indian Army in 1904, where he served for the remainder of his career. Ellis served as Military Accountant-General in India from 1929 to 1935 and was Financial Expert to the Indian Delegation to the Conference for the Reduction and Limitation of Armaments in 1932.
