= HMS Gosport (1740) =

History

United Kingdom
- Name: HMS Gosport
- Ordered: 13 December 1739
- Builder: Thomas Snelgrove, Limehouse
- Launched: 20 February 1740 (3 March 1741 N.S.)
- Commissioned: February 1740 / March 1741
- Fate: Broken up in Chatham 16 June 1768

General characteristics as built
- Class & type: 44-gun fifth rate
- Tons burthen: 69117/94 tons (bm)
- Length: 124 ft 9 in (38.02 m) gundeck; 101 ft 9 in (31.01 m) keel for tonnage
- Beam: 14 ft 7 in (4.45 m)
- Depth of hold: 14 ft 7 in (4.45 m)
- Propulsion: Sails
- Sail plan: Full-rigged ship
- Complement: 250
- Armament: as built 44 guns; 20 x 12-Pounder guns (Lower Gun Deck); 20 x 9-Pounder guns (Upper Gun Deck); 4 x 6-Pounder guns (Quarter Deck)

HMS Gosport was a 44-gun fifth rate of the Royal Navy built by Thomas Snelgrove of Limehouse and launched on 20 February 1740 (3 March 1741 N.S.)

== Ship history ==
Gosport was built at Limehouse by Thomas Snelgrove at a cost of £7,119.0.0d, and completed fitting out at Deptford Dockyard on 16 May 1741 at a cost of £4,126.19.2d. The ship was then commissioned under the command of Captain William Ellis and stationed in the Leeward Islands.

Ellis and the Gosport were involved in escorting convoys through the dangerous Caribbean waters, after one such assignment escorting the Saltertuda Fleet (British merchant ships that sailed to and from La Tortuga (modern-day Tortuga Island, Venezuela) to harvest salt) on 30 May 1743 the Gosport arrived at Sandy Hook (historically a convenient anchorage for ships before proceeding into Upper New York Harbor. It was noted that many of the hands were sick and were 'brought up hither in order for their recover' (taken to New York for medical assistance). Whilst in New York Ellis was removed from command and replaced as commander of the Gosport by a Captain Stourton who then continued on to Boston, arriving on July 14 Ellis's removal from command at this point and death only a short while later on 12 August 1743, as well as the production of a will in the days before his death suggests that he may well have succumbed to illness or disease himself. At this point the ship was paid off (the end of a ship's commission, when the crew was paid their wages) and returned to England for repairs at Sheerness Dockyard. The Gosport was later recommissioned and served in Africa and later returned to the Caribbean.

Under the command of Captain John Eliot the Gosport was tasked with escorting convoys through the Baltic, on one such journey in August 1760 she took a French privateer the 'Marquise de Leede' as a prize.

Eliot later handed command of the Gosport In October 1760 to one John Jervis (later 1st Earl of St Vincent and Admiral of the Fleet) who had been recently promoted to captain, as his first command. George Elphinstone, later Viscount Keith served as a Midshipman on board the Gosport during Jervis's period of command.
