= John Green (Royal Navy officer) =

Royal Navy Admiral (1866–1948)

Admiral Sir John Green KCMG CB
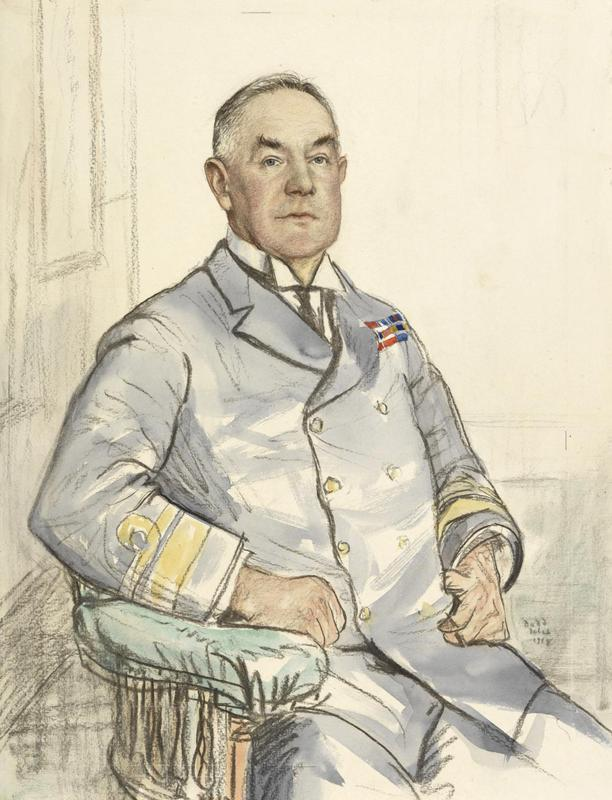
- 1918 portrait by Francis Dodd
- Born: 8 August 1866; Lee, Kent, England
- Died: 30 October 1948 (aged 82)
- Military career
- Allegiance: United Kingdom
- Branch: Royal Navy
- Service years: 1882–1925
- Rank: Admiral
- Commands: Royal Naval Dockyard Rosyth; Coast of Scotland; Rear-Admiral Commanding, White Sea; Senior Naval Officer River Clyde; HMS New Zealand; HMS Natal; HMS Royal Arthur; HMS Essex; HMS Forte; Medway Instructional Flotilla; HMS Racehorse; HMS Mermaid; HMS Pigmy
- Conflicts: Boxer Rebellion; First World War: Battle of Jutland; North Russia intervention
- Awards: Knight Commander of the Order of St Michael and St George; Companion of the Order of the Bath; Mentioned in Despatches

Admiral Sir John Frederick Ernest Green, KCMG, CB (8 August 1866 – 30 October 1948) was a Royal Navy officer of the late 19th and early 20th centuries. He saw service in the Boxer Rebellion, First World War (including the Battle of Jutland), and the North Russia Intervention in the Russian Civil War. Late in his career, he became Commander-in-Chief, Coast of Scotland.

== Birth ==
Green was born in Lee, Kent, England, on 8 August 1866. He was the son of Henry Green.

== Naval career ==
=== Early career ===
Green took the examination for naval cadetships successfully in July 1879, and joined the Royal Navy as a midshipman in 1882. He was promoted to lieutenant on 1 January 1890 and went on to command the gunboat HMS Pigmy during the Boxer Rebellion in 1900, for which role he was mentioned in despatches and received a special promotion to commander on 1 January 1901. He was appointed in command of the destroyer HMS Mermaid on 13 June 1901, and used her as his flagship when he was in charge of the Medway Instructional Flotilla. In May 1902 he transferred with all officers and men of Mermaid to the destroyer HMS Racehorse, which was commissioned for the instructional flotilla. In 1903, the Admiralty demanded that he explain why he had never conducted torpedo practice while in command of the flotilla and was unimpressed by his explanation.

Promoted to captain on 30 June 1906, Green received a commendation in 1907 for efforts he made in helping to salvage the destroyer HMS Ariel, which had been wrecked on 19 April 1907 when she ran aground on a breakwater just outside Grand Harbour, Valletta, Malta. He took command of the second-class protected cruiser HMS Forte on 30 May 1908. In late 1908, Forte performed extremely poorly in a gunlayer's test; a court of inquiry convened to find out the reason for the poor test results faulted Green and the other officers of Forte for failing to provide sufficient training. In 1910, Forte ran aground and the Admiralty expressed "severe displeasure for failure to comply with K[ing]'s R[egulations] & for unseamanlike manner in which H[is] M[ajesty]'s ship was navigated." Green left Forte in March 1911.

Green was commanding officer of the armoured cruiser HMS Essex from September 1911 to May 1912 and took command of the first-class protected cruiser HMS Royal Arthur in October 1912. He took command of the armoured cruiser HMS Natal on 14 May 1913. On 5 June 1913, Natal collided in fog with a fishing vessel. A court of inquiry convened to investigate the collision conclude that Natal's speed of 10 knots (12 mph; 19 km/h) when she struck the fishing vessel was excessive for the foggy conditions, but the Admiralty declined to endorse this finding.

=== First World War ===
Green was still in command of Natal when the United Kingdom entered the First World War in August 1914. He became commanding officer of the battlecruiser HMS New Zealand in June 1915. As such, he was flag captain of the 2nd Battlecruiser Squadron at the Battle of Jutland on 31 May-1 June 1916, during which New Zealand was flagship of the squadron's commander, Rear Admiral William Pakenham. Promoted to rear admiral on 1 September 1917, he served as Senior Naval Officer on the River Clyde from October 1917.

=== Later service ===
On 30 October 1918, Green became Rear-Admiral Commanding in the White Sea during the North Russia intervention in the Russian Civil War with the battleship HMS Glory as his flagship. He became Commander-in-Chief, Coast of Scotland and Admiral Superintendent of Royal Naval Dockyard Rosyth on 1 April 1922. He was promoted to vice admiral on 1 November 1922. He retired from the navy on 1 January 1925, being placed on the Retired List that day at his own request.

== Family ==
In 1901 Green married Maud Kathleen McInnoy.

== Later life ==
While hunting on 31 October 1925 in Fife, Scotland, with retired Admiral Edward H. Moubray and Admiral Sir Henry Oliver, Commander-in-Chief of the Atlantic Fleet, Green accidentally shot Oliver with one barrel of his shotgun. Oliver was not seriously injured, and later said that it was not the first time that Green had accidentally shot someone and that Green in fact had a reputation for it.

While on the retired list, Green was promoted to admiral on 1 August 1927. He died on 30 October 1948.

Military offices
Preceded by Sir Herbert Heath	Commander-in-Chief, Coast of Scotland; 1922–1923	Succeeded by Sir Reginald Tyrwhitt
