= British Adriatic Squadron =

Adriatic Squadron
- Active: 1915-1919
- Country: United Kingdom
- Allegiance: British Empire
- Branch: Royal Navy
- Type: Squadron
- Part of: Mediterranean Fleet (1915-1919)
- Garrison/HQ: Taranto

Commanders
- Notable commanders: Rear-Admiral Sir Cecil F. Thursby

The British Adriatic Squadron, or simply the Adriatic Squadron and later known as the British Adriatic Force, was a military formation of the Mediterranean Fleet during World War I based at Taranto from 1915–19.

== History ==
In May 1915 Italy entered the war aligning itself with allied powers against the Central Powers, becoming involved in the Adriatic Campaign of World War I. But due to a lack of coordination with the French Naval Command by the Italians, the British decided to enforce an allied agreement by establishing a British Adriatic Squadron to be based at Taranto. Between July and September 1917 the Mediterranean Fleet was reorganised following coordination between other allied powers. Britain's scope of geographic responsibility to include new sub commands would encompass the Adriatic Sea, Aegean Sea, Coast of Egypt, Gibraltar and the waters around Malta. Following command changes in August 1917 the squadron was downgraded and renamed the British Adriatic Force.

== Commanders ==
Post holders included:

Rank	Flag	Name	Term	Title	Notes/Ref
Rear Admiral	Rear-Admiral - Royal Navy	Sir Cecil F. Thursby	June, 1915 – May, 1916	Rear-Admiral Commanding, British Adriatic Squadron	
Rear Admiral	Rear-Admiral - Royal Navy	Mark E. F. Kerr	May, 1916 – August, 1917	Rear-Admiral Commanding, British Adriatic Squadron	
Rear Admiral	Rear-Admiral - Royal Navy	Algernon W. Heneage	May, 1916 – August, 1917	Rear-Admiral Commanding, British Adriatic Squadron	
Commodore		Sir Howard Kelly	August 1917 – 1919	Commodore Commanding, British Adriatic Force	

== Sources ==
- Halpern, Paul G. (2004). The Battle of the Otranto Straits: Controlling the Gateway to the Adriatic in World War I. Bloomington, Indiana USA: Indiana University Press. ISBN 025311019X.
- Harley, Simon; Lovell, Tony (2015). "Adriatic Squadron (Royal Navy) - The Dreadnought Project". www.dreadnoughtproject.org. Harley and Lovell.
- Marder, Arthur J. (2014). "2:Offensive in the Adriatic". From the Dreadnought to Scapa Flow[electronic resource] (revised ed.). Barnsley, England: Seaforth Publishing. ISBN 1473841887.
- Sondhaus, Lawrence (2014). The Great War at Sea: A Naval History of the First World War. Cambridge, England: Cambridge University Press. ISBN 9781107036901.
- Watson, Dr Graham (2015). "Royal Navy Organisation and Ship Deployment, World War One 1914-1918:THE MEDITERRANEAN". www.naval-history.net. Gordon Smith.
