= Ranger (Girl Guide) =

Member of a section of Guiding organizations

A Ranger or Ranger Guide is a member of a section of some Guiding organisations who is between the ages of 14 and 18. It is the female-centred equivalent of the Rover Scouts.

== Early history ==
Girl Guiding had officially been founded in 1910 in the United Kingdom. By 1916–17, it had become apparent that girls who had been Girl Guides from the start were getting too old for their companies, and that older girls wished to become Guides but did not fit well in companies of younger girls. "Senior Guides" slowly came into existence as some captains (adult leaders of companies) formed patrols of girls over 16 years old. Robert Baden-Powell, the founder of Scouting and Guiding, was interested in this development and in June 1917 asked Rose Kerr to take on responsibility for them, outlining to her a plan for them. The scheme for the Senior Guides was published in parts in 1918.

In the next two years, many suggestions of name change were discussed but no consensus was reached. Rose Kerr recounts a conversation with Robert Baden-Powell in 1920 where he suggested "Ranger", one of the rejected suggestions for the Senior Scouts (by then called Rovers). In June 1920, Olave Baden-Powell, then the Chief Guide, wrote:

Here is the suggested new name: "Ranger". If you look it up in the dictionary, you will find it means quite a number of things. "To range" is "to set in proper order"; "to roam", and this might well mean you are going to tread ground as a Senior Guide that as a Guide you have not yet passed.

"Distance of vision, and extent of discourse or roaming power" again shows that as a senior member of the community you are expected to look farther afield for good, and the work that you can do for the community.

"To range" means to travel, or to rove over wide distances, whether in your mind or your body. A Ranger is "one who guards a large tract of land or forest," thus it come to mean one who has the wide outlook, and a sense of responsible protective duties, appropriate to a Senior Guide. Another definition is "to sail along in a parallel direction," and so we can feel that the Ranger Guides are complementary to the Rover Scouts.

And so we hope that this new title will have the approval of all.

The name received approval at a Conference of County Commissioners in July 1920, and was thereafter the official name.

== Girlguiding UK ==
Rangers have a long history in the United Kingdom, but their name was changed to "Senior Section", but has now been changed back. In Girlguiding UK, Rangers is replacing The Senior Section (TSS). Rangers can belong to Units in the same way as Rainbows, Brownies or Guides belong to Units. Rangers is open to girls from 14 to 18 years old. They can pursue any or all of several schemes including The King's Guide and the Duke of Edinburgh's Award.

Previously, there were also Sea Rangers and Air Rangers. Princess Elizabeth, was a Sea Ranger, later Sea Ranger Commodore, Chief Ranger, and Queen.

Members of Rangers often play a wider role in the running of Girlguiding as they take on additional responsibilities. Many members of Rangers are assistant or unit leaders for other sections (Rainbows, Brownies, Guides), train as Peer Educators and deliver training to younger sections and their own section on topics such as Mental Health and, Division/ District/ County Commissioners and Advisors, Trainers and Trustees.

Members of Rangers hold a seat on the National Committees. This is often the chair of the youth representation body (Polaris is Scotland, Pegasus in Ulster). Any member of Rangers over the age of 16 can join these groups and provide a voice for the members of the organisation on key issues. Girlguiding also holds seats in the Scottish Youth Parliament and the British Youth Council, these positions are held by a member of Rangers.

In Girlguiding UK, the terms The Senior Section, Rangers and Ranger Guides are often used interchangeably.

The Rangers promise is the same as that of the Guides:

I promise that I will do my best:
To be true to myself and develop my beliefs,
To serve the King and my community,
To help other people
and
To keep the Guide Law.

== GirlGuiding New Zealand ==
In GirlGuiding New Zealand, Rangers are girls between 14 and 18. The Ranger's mascot is called Woozle.

When Rangers reach the age of 18 many become Rovers which are part of the Scout movement and many do this as well as being leaders in the Guide movement.
