= HMS Greyhound (1672) =

British 16-gun frigate

History

England
- Name: HMS Greyhound
- Ordered: 6 December 1671
- Builder: Royal Dockyard, Portsmouth
- Launched: July 1672
- Commissioned: 17 July 1672
- Honours and awards: Barfleur 1692
- Fate: Sold 13 May 1698

General characteristics
- Class & type: 16/14=gun, Sixth Rate
- Tons burthen: 184 38/94 bm
- Length: 93 ft 0 in (28.35 m) gundeck; 75 ft 0 in (22.86 m) keel for tonnage
- Beam: 21 ft 6 in (6.55 m) for tonnage
- Draught: 8 ft 6 in (2.59 m)
- Depth of hold: 9 ft 0 in (2.74 m)
- Armament: as built; 16 × 6-pounder MLSB guns; 1685; 14 × sakers on trucks; 2 × 3-pdrs

HMS Greyhound was a sixth-rate frigate of the English Royal Navy, built by Master Shipwright Anthony Deane at Portsmouth Dockyard after his transfer to Portsmouth Dockyard; Harwich Dockyard was closed at the end of 1667.

Greyhound was a state-of-the-art small frigate, and may have served as a forerunner for the standard 20-gun sixth-rates of the 1690s. She was a standard 16-gun vessel. Her name was chosen to reflect her fine lines as a trade protection vessel. She was commissioned in July 1672 for fisheries protection, transported troops to Tangiers in 1681 and spent most of her career in the Irish Sea, including operations around Derry, she patrolled the North Sea and Channel with her final service with the fleet. She was sold in 1698.

Greyhound was the fourth Royal Navy vessel of that name, which was first used for a 45-gun ship launched at Deptford in 1545, rebuilt in 1558 then wrecked in 1563 off the Rye.

== Design and specifications ==
Greyhound was ordered on 8 December 1671. She was launched at Portsmouth Dockyard in July 1672. Her gundeck was 93 feet 0 inches (28.35 metres), keel length reported for tonnage was 75 feet 0 inches (22.86 metres). Her breadth was 21 feet 6 inches (6.55 metres) as reported for tonnage, with her depth of hold of 9 feet 0 inches (2.74 metres). Her draught was only 8 feet 6 inches (2.59 metres). Her tonnage was calculated as 184 38/94 tons.

Her initial armament was listed as fourteen to sixteen 6-pounder muzzle-loading smoothbore guns mounted on trucks. By 1685, this was changed to sixteen sakers and two 3-pounder smoothbore guns. A saker cannon was a muzzle-loading smoothbore 1,400 pound gun with a 3 1/2-inch bore, firing a 5 1/2-inch shot with a 5 1/2-pound powder charge. The guns were also mounted on wooden trucks.

== Commissioned service ==
Greyhound was commissioned on 17 July 1672 under Captain John Clements, RN for service in Home Waters for trade protection and fisheries patrol. Captain Clements remained in command until 14 August 1674. On 5 May 1675 again under Captain Clements she transported troops to Tangiers in June 1680, returning on 7 January 1681. On 15 July 1683 she was under the command of Captain Randall Macdonell, RN. She was assigned to the English Channel during 1683 thru 1684, went to Salé in 1685 and was involved in a boat action at Mamora on 12 June 1685. Captain John Gillam, RN took command on 25 March 1689 for service in Ireland and Scotland and was involved in Derry operations. On 22 February 1690 Captain Charles Staggins, RN took over command for service in the Irish Sea. In 1691 Captain John Fletcher assumed command, then in 1692-93 Captain William Kiggins, RN was her commander in the North Sea and Channel. Her final commander was Captain James Atkins, RN from 11 December 1693 until May/June 1695.

== Disposition ==
Greyhound was sold by Admiralty Order (AO) 15 April 1698 on 5 May 1698.
