= English ship Greyhound (1545) =

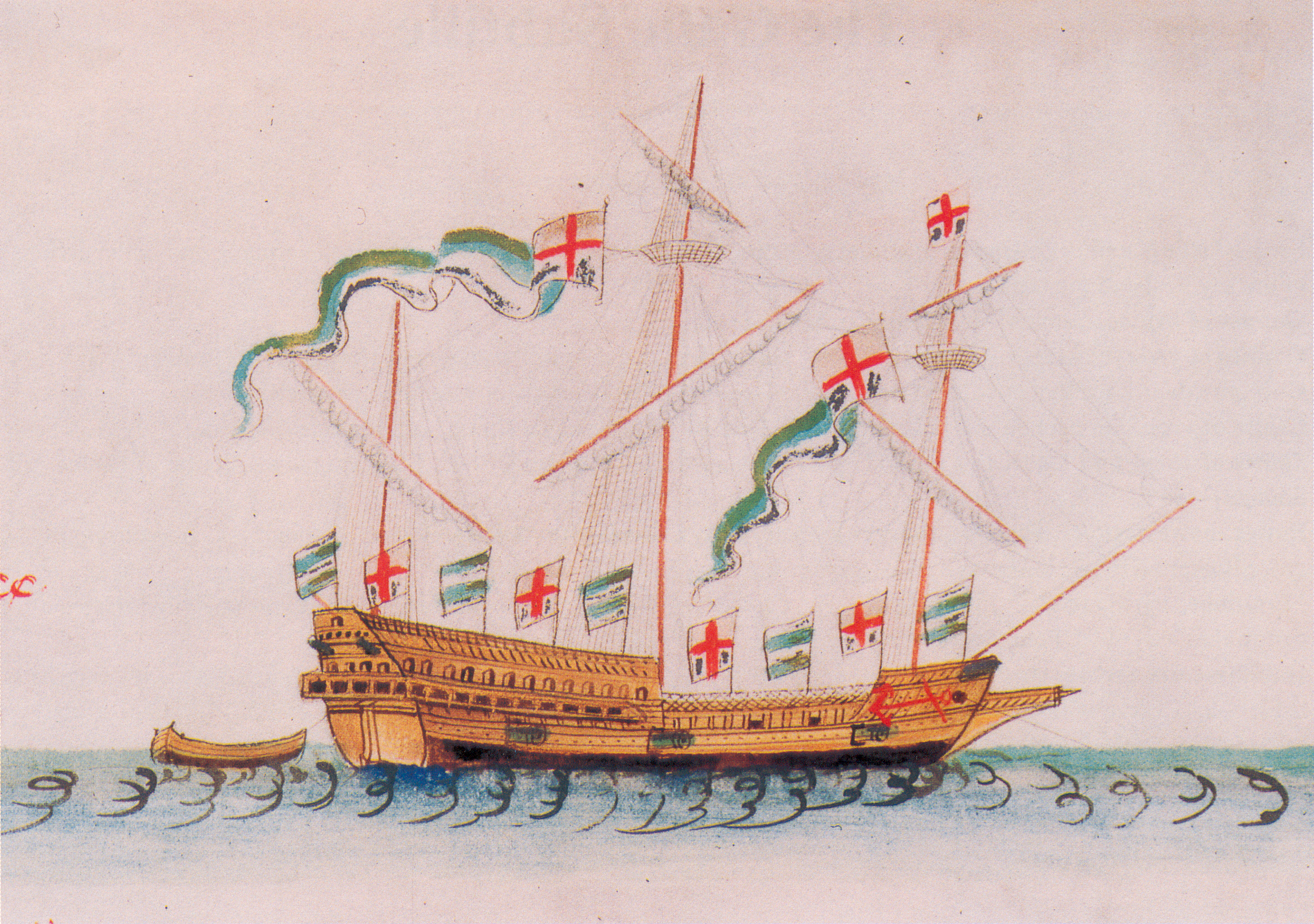
The Greyound depicted in the 1546 Anthony Roll

The English navy ship Greyhound, first built in 1544 or 1545, probably at Deptford, was wrecked in April 1563 on a sand bar near Rye. The Greyhound was a "galleass", smaller than the greatest warships of the English fleet.

During the war between England and Scotland known as the Rough Wooing, the Greyhound sailed to Scotland in a fleet commanded by Lord Clinton in May 1548.

In 1553 the Duke of Northumberland, who supported the title of Lady Jane Grey to the crown of England, ordered Captain Gilbert Grice to blockade Yarmouth with the Greyhound to prevent Mary I of England embarking. The Greyhound joined a fleet of five ships led by the Hart. When Grice went ashore at Lowestoft, he was captured by Mary's supporters and taken to Framlingham Castle. The remaining sailors, led by John Hurlocke, declared for Mary and took control of the ship. Subsequently, Grice was pardoned by Mary and reinstated. He was able to sue his former shipmates for his possessions. Grice owned a blue coat in the Duke of Northumberland's livery colours.

In 1555 the armaments of the Greyhound included a brass cannon perrier, a brass culverin perrier, a brass demi-culverin, 2 sakers, a minion, 2 falcons, and 13 iron cannon, with 70 yew bows.

The Greyhound took part in a raid at Kirkwall on Orkney in 1557. The landing party was repulsed and many troops were drowned attempting to return to the ships, including the commander John Clere. The ship was rebuilt in 1558 and sent to Scotland in 1560 to support the siege of Leith.
