= HMS Racehorse (1900) =

Destroyer of the Royal Navy

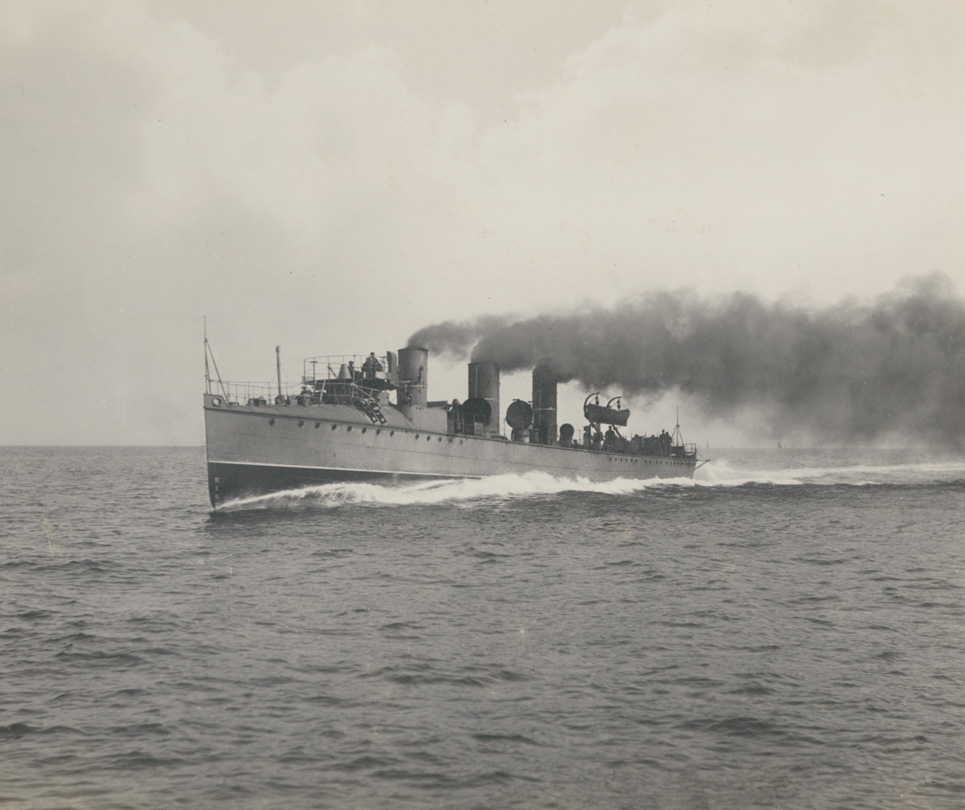

History

United Kingdom
- Name: HMS Racehorse
- Ordered: 1898 – 1899 Naval Estimates
- Builder: R.W. Hawthorn Leslie and Company, Hebburn-on-Tyne
- Laid down: 23 October 1899
- Launched: 8 November 1900
- Commissioned: March 1902
- Out of service: Paid off, 1919
- Fate: Sold for breaking, 23 March 1920

General characteristics
- Class & type: Hawthorn Leslie three funnel - 30 knot destroyer
- Displacement: 355 long tons (361 t) standard; 415 long tons (422 t) full load
- Length: 214 ft 9 in (65.46 m) o/a
- Beam: 21 ft (6.4 m)
- Draught: 6 ft 1 in (1.85 m)
- Installed power: 6,300 shp (4,700 kW)
- Propulsion: 4 × Thornycroft water tube boilers; 2 × vertical triple-expansion steam engines; 2 × shafts
- Speed: 30 kn (56 km/h)
- Range: 95 tons coal; 1,615 nmi (2,991 km) at 11 kn (20 km/h)
- Complement: 63 officers and men
- Armament: 1 × QF 12-pounder 12 cwt Mark I L/40 naval gun on a P Mark I low angle mount; 5 × QF 6-pounder 8 cwt L/40 naval gun on a Mark I * low angle mount; 2 × single tubes for 18-inch (450mm) torpedoes

Service record
- Operations: World War I 1914 - 1918
- Awards: Battle honour Belgian Coast 1915 – 16

HMS Racehorse was a three-funnel, 30-knot torpedo boat destroyer built by Hawthorn Leslie for the Royal Navy. Ordered by the Royal Navy under the 1898–1899 Naval Estimates, she was the eighth ship to carry this name since it was introduced in 1757. She served in World War I and was sold for breaking in 1920.

== Construction ==
She was laid down on 23 October 1899 at the R.W. Hawthorn Leslie and Company shipyard at Hebburn-on-Tyne and launched on 8 November 1900. During her builder's trials she made her contract speed of 30 knots. She was completed and accepted by the Royal Navy in March 1902.

== Service ==
After commissioning she was assigned to the Channel Fleet. She spent her operational career mainly in home waters. In May 1902 she received the officers and men from HMS Mermaid, and was commissioned at Chatham by Commander John Green for service with the Medway Instructional Flotilla. She took part in the fleet review held at Spithead on 16 August 1902 for the coronation of King Edward VII. In 1909 she was assigned to the 2nd Flotilla at Portland under the command of Lieutenant G B Hartford.

On 30 August 1912 the Admiralty directed all destroyer classes were to be designated by letters. Since her design speed was 30-knots and she had three funnels she was assigned with similar vessels to the C class. After 30 September 1913, she was known as a C-class destroyer and had the letter ‘C’ painted on the hull below the bridge area and on either the fore or aft funnel.

By July 1914 she was in the 6th Destroyer Flotilla tendered to HMS Attentive based at Dover. While employed in the 6th Flotilla she performed anti-submarine and counter-mining patrols as well as Dover Barrage defensive patrols. On 28 October 1914 under the command of Lieutenant E P U Pender, she was part of the anti-submarine screen for operations off the Belgian coast.

From 22 August through 19 November 1915, Along with her sisters Mermaid and Greyhound, she provided an anti-submarine screen for several operations off the Belgian coast.

In 1919 she was paid off and laid-up in reserve awaiting disposal. She was sold on 23 March 1920 to M Yates for breaking at Milford Haven. She was awarded the battle honour Belgian Coast 1915 – 16 for her service.

== Pennant numbers ==
Pennant number	From	To
P15	6 December 1914	1 September 1915
D66	1 September 1915	1 January 1918
D71	1 January 1918	23 March 1920

== Bibliography ==
- Brassey, T.A. (1902). The Naval Annual 1902. Portsmouth, UK: J. Griffin and Co.
- Chesneau, Roger & Kolesnik, Eugene M., eds. (1979). Conway's All The World's Fighting Ships 1860–1905. London: Conway Maritime Press. ISBN 0-85177-133-5.
- Colledge, J. J.; Warlow, Ben (2006) [1969]. Ships of the Royal Navy: The Complete Record of All Fighting Ships of the Royal Navy from the 15th Century to the Present (3rd Rev ed.). London: Chatham Publishing. ISBN 978-1-86176-281-8. OCLC 67375475.
- Dittmar, F. J. & Colledge, J. J. (1972). British Warships 1914–1919. Shepperton, UK: Ian Allan. ISBN 0-7110-0380-7.
- Friedman, Norman (2009). British Destroyers: From Earliest Days to the Second World War. Barnsley, UK: Seaforth Publishing. ISBN 978-1-84832-049-9.
- Gardiner, Robert & Gray, Randal, eds. (1985). Conway's All The World's Fighting Ships 1906–1921. London: Conway Maritime Press. ISBN 0-85177-245-5.
- Grant, Robert M. (1964). U-Boats Destroyed: the Effect of Anti-Submarine Warfare 1914–1918. London: Putnam.
- Jane, Fred T. (1969) [1st. pub. Sampson Low & Marston, London]. Jane's All the World's Fighting Ships 1898. New York: ARCO Publishing Company.
- Keyes, Roger (1935). The Naval Memoirs of Admiral of the Fleet Sir Roger Keyes: Volume 2: Scapa Flow to the Dover Straits. Taylor & Francis.
- Lyon, David (2001) [1996]. The First Destroyers. London: Caxton Editions. ISBN 1-84067-364-8.
- Manning, T. D. (1961). The British Destroyer. London: Putnam & Co. OCLC 6470051.
- March, Edgar J. (1966). British Destroyers: A History of Development, 1892–1953; Drawn by Admiralty Permission From Official Records & Returns, Ships' Covers & Building Plans. London: Seeley Service. OCLC 164893555.
- McCartney, Innes (2003). Lost Patrols: Submarine Wrecks of the English Channel. Penzance, UK: Periscope Publishing Ltd. ISBN 1-904381-04-9.
- Moore, John (1990). Jane's Fighting Ships of World War I. London: Studio Editions. ISBN 1-85170-378-0.
