= HMS Mermaid (1898) =

Destroyer of the Royal Navy

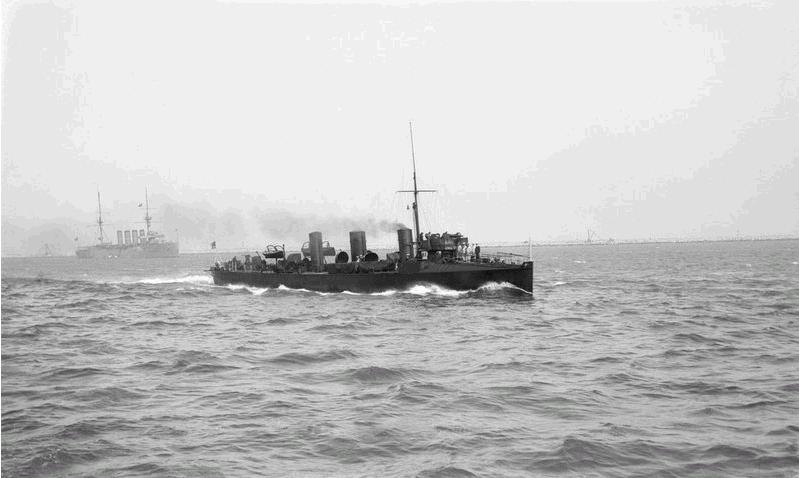
- The visually identical Greyhound underway in 1906

History

United Kingdom
- Name: Mermaid
- Ordered: 1896 – 1897 Naval Estimates
- Builder: R.W. Hawthorn Leslie and Company, Hebburn-on-Tyne
- Cost: £54,509
- Yard number: 343
- Laid down: 7 September 1896
- Launched: 22 February 1898 (Note: Lyon has a launch date of 14 July 1897 (and shows Mermaid as launched 22 February 1898) but notes that it is "not clear from the records consulted why Mermaid should be launched before, but completed after, her sister.")
- Commissioned: June 1899
- Out of service: 1919
- Fate: Sold for breaking, 23 July 1919

General characteristics
- Class & type: Hawthorn Leslie three-funnel, 30 knot destroyer
- Displacement: 355 long tons (361 t) light; 400 long tons (406 t) full load
- Length: 215 ft (66 m) o/a
- Beam: 21 ft 1 in (6.43 m)
- Draught: 8 ft 2 in (2.49 m)
- Installed power: 6,100 ihp (4,500 kW)
- Propulsion: 4 × Thornycroft water tube boilers; 2 × vertical triple-expansion steam engines; 2 shafts
- Speed: 30 kn (56 km/h)
- Range: 95 tons coal; 1,615 nmi (2,991 km) at 11 kn (20 km/h)
- Complement: 63 officers and men
- Armament: 1 × QF 12-pounder 12 cwt Mark I L/40 naval gun on a P Mark I low angle mount; 5 × QF 6-pdr 8 cwt L/40 naval gun on a Mark I* low angle mount; 2 × single tubes for 18-inch (450mm) torpedoes

HMS Mermaid was a Hawthorn Leslie three-funnel, 30 knot destroyer ordered by the Royal Navy under the 1896 – 1897 Naval Estimates. She was launched in 1898, served during World War I and was sold for breaking in 1919.

== Construction and career ==
She was laid down on 7 September 1896 at the R.W. Hawthorn Leslie and Company shipyard at Hebburn-on-Tyne and launched on 22 February 1898. During her builder's trials she made her contract speed of 30 knots. She was completed and accepted by the Royal Navy in June 1899. She was commissioned by Commander Mark Kerr as part of the Medway Instructional Flotilla on completion in 1899, but was replaced in the flotilla by HMS Cheerful in March 1900.

She served as flagship for Commander John Green when he took command of the flotilla on 13 June 1901. In May 1902 she transferred her officers and crew to HMS Racehorse. She was deployed in home waters for her entire service life except for a brief visit to Gibraltar in 1910.

On 30 August 1912 the Admiralty directed all destroyer classes were to be designated by letters starting with 'A'. Since her design speed was 30 knots and she had three funnels, she was assigned to the C class. After 30 September 1913 she was known as a C-class destroyer and had the letter ‘C’ painted on the hull below the bridge area and on either the fore or aft funnel.

=== World War I ===
In July 1914 she was in active commission in the 6th Destroyer Flotilla tendered to HMS Attentive based at Dover. On 28 October 1914 under the command of Lieutenant P Percival she was part of the anti-submarine screen for operations off the Belgian Coast. From 22 August to 19 November 1915, along with Greyhound and Racehorse, she provided anti-submarine screen for several operations off the Belgian Coast. In November 1917 she was redeployed to the 7th Destroyer Flotilla based on the Humber where she would finish the war. She was awarded the battle honour "Belgian Coast 1914 – 17".

In 1919 she was paid off and laid-up in reserve awaiting disposal. She was sold on 23 July 1919 to Thos. W. Ward of Sheffield for breaking at New Holland, Lincolnshire, on the Humber Estuary.

== Pennant numbers ==
Pennant number	From	To
P35	6 Dec 1914	1 Sep 1915
D63	1 Sep 1915	1 Jan 1918
D56	1 Jan 1918	13 Sep 1918
H85	13 Sep 1918	23 Jul 1919

== Bibliography ==
- Chesneau, Roger & Kolesnik, Eugene M., eds. (1979). Conway's All The World's Fighting Ships 1860–1905. London: Conway Maritime Press. ISBN 0-85177-133-5.
- Colledge, J. J.; Warlow, Ben (2006) [1969]. Ships of the Royal Navy: The Complete Record of All Fighting Ships of the Royal Navy from the 15th Century to the Present (3rd Rev ed.). London: Chatham Publishing. ISBN 978-1-86176-281-8. OCLC 67375475.
- Dittmar, F. J. & Colledge, J. J. (1972). British Warships 1914–1919. Shepperton, UK: Ian Allan. ISBN 0-7110-0380-7.
- Friedman, Norman (2009). British Destroyers: From Earliest Days to the Second World War. Barnsley, UK: Seaforth Publishing. ISBN 978-1-84832-049-9.
- Gardiner, Robert & Gray, Randal, eds. (1985). Conway's All The World's Fighting Ships 1906–1921. London: Conway Maritime Press. ISBN 0-85177-245-5.
- Lyon, David (2001) [1996]. The First Destroyers. London: Caxton Editions. ISBN 1-84067-364-8.
- Manning, T. D. (1961). The British Destroyer. London: Putnam & Co. OCLC 6470051.
- March, Edgar J. (1966). British Destroyers: A History of Development, 1892–1953; Drawn by Admiralty Permission From Official Records & Returns, Ships' Covers & Building Plans. London: Seeley Service. OCLC 164893555.
