= Jacques-Henri Schloesing =

Jacques-Henri Schloesing (December 12, 1919 - August 26, 1944) was a French soldier, Companion of Liberation. An aviator who joined Free France, he distinguished himself in the battles above the English Channel and the French coasts. Surviving the crash of his plane for the first time, he managed to escape the Germans and return to combat a few months later before being shot down again and dying in 1944.

Content in this edit is translated from the existing French Wikipedia article at fr:Jacques-Henri Schloesing.
