= HMS Cheerful (1897) =

Destroyer of the Royal Navy

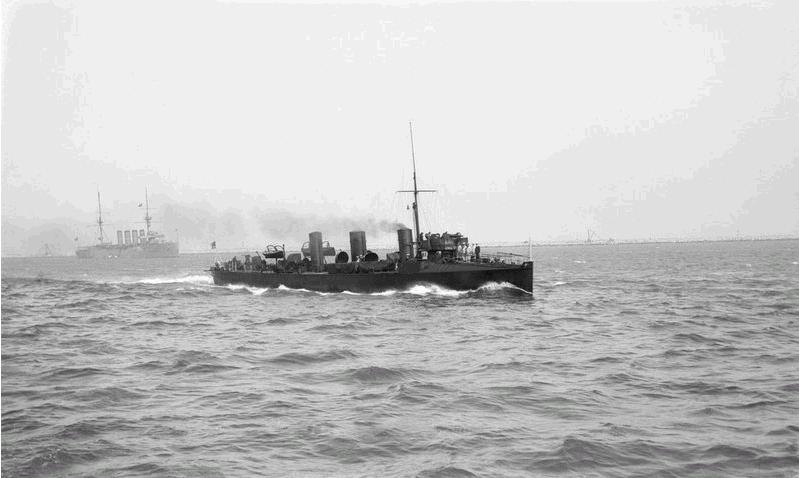
- The visually identical Greyhound underway in 1906

History

United Kingdom
- Name: HMS Cheerful
- Ordered: 1896 – 1897 Naval Estimates
- Builder: R.W. Hawthorn Leslie & Co., Hebburn-on-Tyne
- Cost: £54,509
- Yard number: 343
- Laid down: 7 September 1896
- Launched: 14 July 1897 (Note: Lyon has a launch date of 22 February 1898 (and shows Mermaid as launched 14 July 1897) but notes that it is "not clear from the records consulted why Mermaid should be launched before, but completed after, her sister.")
- Commissioned: June 1899
- Fate: Mined on 30 June 1917

General characteristics
- Class & type: Hawthorn Leslie three-funnel, 30-knot destroyer
- Displacement: 355 long tons (361 t) light; 400 long tons (406 t) full load
- Length: 215 ft (66 m) o/a
- Beam: 21 ft 1 in (6.43 m)
- Draught: 8 ft 2 in (2.49 m)
- Installed power: 6,100 ihp (4,500 kW)
- Propulsion: 4 × Thornycroft water tube boilers; 2 × vertical triple-expansion steam engines; 2 shafts
- Speed: 30 kn (56 km/h)
- Range: 95 tons coal; 1,615 nmi (2,991 km) at 11 kn (20 km/h; 13 mph)
- Complement: 63 officers and men
- Armament: 1 × QF 12-pounder 12 cwt Mark I L/40 naval gun on a P Mark I low angle mount; 5 × QF 6-pdr 8 cwt L/40 naval gun on a Mark I* low angle mount; 2 × single tubes for 18-inch (450mm) torpedoes

Service record
- Operations: World War I 1914 - 1918

HMS Cheerful was a 30-knot, three-funnel torpedo boat destroyer built by Hawthorn Leslie. She was ordered by the Royal Navy under the 1896–1897 Naval Estimates, launched in 1898, and saw action during World War I. She was mined off the Shetland Islands in 1917 and sank with the loss of 44 officers and men.

== Construction ==
She was laid down on 7 September 1896, at the R.W. Hawthorn Leslie and Company shipyard at Hebburn-on-Tyne, and launched on 14 July 1897. During her builder's trials, she made her contract speed of 30 knots (56 km/h; 35 mph). She was completed and accepted by the Royal Navy in February 1900, and passed into the Medway Fleet Reserve at Chatham.

== Service ==
After commissioning, she was assigned to the Chatham Division of the Harwich Flotilla. She was deployed in home waters for her entire service life. On 6 March 1900, she was commissioned at Chatham to take the place of HMS Mermaid in the Medway instructional flotilla, with Commander Mark Kerr transferring from Mermaid to take command of Cheerful. In April 1900, she was present at an accident at Brighton's West Pier, when seven sailors from HMS Desperate were drowned in bad weather as they approached the pier.

On 30 August 1912, the Admiralty directed all destroyer classes were to be designated by letters. She was assigned to the C class along with the other 3-funnel, 30-knot destroyers. After 30 September 1913, she was known as a C-class destroyer and had the letter ‘C’ painted on the hull below the bridge area and on either the fore or aft funnel. Between 1912 and 1914 she had a wireless radio set installed.

In July 1914, she was in active commission in the 8th Destroyer Flotilla based at Sheerness and tendered to HMS Tyne, the flotilla depot ship. Her duties included anti-submarine and counter-mining patrols.

On 26 September, two torpedoes were fired at her, 3 miles (4.8 km) west of Fidra in the Firth of Forth. At the end of September 1914, she was redeployed to the Shetland patrol based out of Scapa Flow. Here, she was deployed in anti-submarine operations and defending the main fleet anchorage. In December 1914, she was given the pennant number P13; at the start of September 1915, this was changed to D49.

On 30 June 1917, while on patrol off the Shetland Islands, she struck a contact mine that had been laid by German submarine UC-33. She sank with the loss of 44 officers and men in position 60°02′N 01°07′W.

== Bibliography ==
- Chesneau, Roger & Kolesnik, Eugene M., eds. (1979). Conway's All The World's Fighting Ships 1860–1905. London: Conway Maritime Press. ISBN 0-85177-133-5.
- Colledge, J. J.; Warlow, Ben (2006) [1969]. Ships of the Royal Navy: The Complete Record of All Fighting Ships of the Royal Navy from the 15th Century to the Present (3rd Rev ed.). London: Chatham Publishing. ISBN 978-1-86176-281-8. OCLC 67375475.
- Dittmar, F. J. & Colledge, J. J. (1972). British Warships 1914–1919. Shepperton, UK: Ian Allan. ISBN 0-7110-0380-7.
- Friedman, Norman (2009). British Destroyers: From Earliest Days to the Second World War. Barnsley, UK: Seaforth Publishing. ISBN 978-1-84832-049-9.
- Gardiner, Robert & Gray, Randal, eds. (1985). Conway's All The World's Fighting Ships 1906–1921. London: Conway Maritime Press. ISBN 0-85177-245-5.
- Lyon, David (2001) [1996]. The First Destroyers. London: Caxton Editions. ISBN 1-84067-3648.
- Manning, T. D. (1961). The British Destroyer. London: Putnam & Co. OCLC 6470051.
- March, Edgar J. (1966). British Destroyers: A History of Development, 1892–1953; Drawn by Admiralty Permission From Official Records & Returns, Ships' Covers & Building Plans. London: Seeley Service. OCLC 164893555.
