= HMS Greyhound (1900) =

Destroyer of the Royal Navy

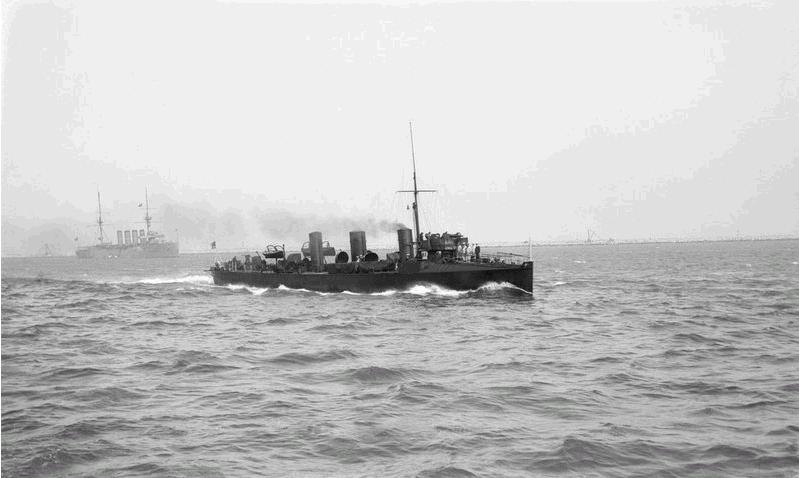
- Greyhound underway at Portland, 1906

History

United Kingdom
- Name: Greyhound
- Ordered: 1898 – 1899 Naval Estimates
- Builder: R.W. Hawthorn Leslie & Co., Hebburn-on-Tyne
- Cost: £61,066
- Yard number: 377
- Laid down: 18 July 1899
- Launched: 6 October 1900
- Completed: January 1902
- Out of service: November 1918
- Honours and awards: Belgian Coast 1915–1918
- Fate: Sold for breaking, 10 June 1919

General characteristics
- Class & type: Hawthorn Leslie three-funnel, 30 knot destroyer
- Displacement: 385 long tons (391 t) light; 430 long tons (437 t) full load
- Length: 214 ft 6 in (65.38 m) o/a
- Beam: 21 ft 1 in (6.43 m)
- Draught: 6 ft 1 in (1.85 m)
- Installed power: 6,300 shp (4,700 kW)
- Propulsion: 4 × Yarrow water tube boilers; 2 × vertical triple-expansion steam engines; 2 shafts
- Speed: 30 kn (56 km/h)
- Range: 95 tons coal; 1,615 nmi (2,991 km) at 11 kn (20 km/h)
- Complement: 63 officers and men
- Armament: 1 × QF 12-pounder 12 cwt Mark I L/40 naval gun on a P Mark I low angle mount; 5 × QF 6-pdr 8 cwt L/40 naval gun on a Mark I* low angle mount; 2 × single tubes for 18-inch (450mm) torpedoes

HMS Greyhound was a Hawthorn Leslie three-funnel, 30 knot destroyer ordered by the Royal Navy under the 1898 – 1899 Naval Estimates.

== Construction and career ==
She was laid down as builder's number 377 on 18 July 1899, at the R.W. Hawthorn Leslie and Company shipyard at Hebburn-on-Tyne and launched on 6 October 1900. During her builder's trials she made her contract speed of 30 knots. She was completed and accepted by the Royal Navy in January 1902, at a total cost of £61,066. Greyhound was assigned to the Channel Fleet on her commission. In May 1902, she was under the command of Commander Marcus Rowley Hill when she transferred her officers and crew to Roebuck. She spent her operational career mainly in Home Waters operating with the Channel Fleet in the East Coast Flotilla.

On 30 August 1912, the Admiralty directed all destroyer classes were to be designated by letters starting with 'A'. Since her design speed was 30-knots and she had three funnels she was assigned to the C class. After 30 September 1913, she was known as a C-class destroyer and had the letter ‘C’ painted on the hull below the bridge area and on either the fore or aft funnel.

=== World War I ===
July 1914, found her in the 6th Destroyer Flotilla tendered to Attentive based at Dover. While employed in the 6th Flotilla she performed anti-submarine and counter mining patrols as well as Dover Barrage defensive patrols. From 22 August to 19 November 1915, along with Mermaid and Racehorse, she provided anti-submarine screen for several operations off the Belgian Coast. In November 1916, she was redeployed to the 7th Destroyer Flotilla on the Humber performing anti-submarine patrols and counter-mining operations off the East Coast of England until the Armistice. She was awarded the battle honour "Belgian Coast 1915 – 18".

By November 1918, she was paid off and placed in reserve awaiting disposal. She was sold on 10 June 1919, to Clarkeson of Whitby for breaking.

== Pennant numbers ==
| Pennant number | From | To |
|---|---|---|
| P01 | 6 Dec 1914 | 1 Sep 1915 |
| D59 | 1 Sep 1915 | 1 Jan 1918 |
| D44 | 1 Jan 1918 | 13 Sep 1918 |
| H43 | 13 Sep 1918 | 10 Jun 1919 |

== Bibliography ==
- Chesneau, Roger & Kolesnik, Eugene M., eds. (1979). Conway's All The World's Fighting Ships 1860–1905. London: Conway Maritime Press. ISBN 0-85177-133-5.
- Colledge, J. J.; Warlow, Ben (2006) [1969]. Ships of the Royal Navy: The Complete Record of All Fighting Ships of the Royal Navy from the 15th Century to the Present (3rd Rev ed.). London: Chatham Publishing. ISBN 978-1-86176-281-8. OCLC 67375475.
- Dittmar, F. J. & Colledge, J. J. (1972). British Warships 1914–1919. Shepperton, UK: Ian Allan. ISBN 0-7110-0380-7.
- Friedman, Norman (2009). British Destroyers: From Earliest Days to the Second World War. Barnsley, UK: Seaforth Publishing. ISBN 978-1-84832-049-9.
- Gardiner, Robert & Gray, Randal, eds. (1985). Conway's All The World's Fighting Ships 1906–1921. London: Conway Maritime Press. ISBN 0-85177-245-5.
- Lyon, David (2001) [1996]. The First Destroyers. London: Caxton Editions. ISBN 1-84067-364-8.
- Manning, T. D. (1961). The British Destroyer. London: Putnam & Co. OCLC 6470051.
- March, Edgar J. (1966). British Destroyers: A History of Development, 1892–1953; Drawn by Admiralty Permission From Official Records & Returns, Ships' Covers & Building Plans. London: Seeley Service. OCLC 164893555.
