= Chief Guide =

In the Guide Movement, a Chief Guide is the uniformed head of a national Guiding organisation. Olave Baden-Powell, wife of Robert Baden Powell became the first Chief Guide in 1918.

== World Chief Guide ==
1930 - 1977 Olave Baden-Powell (only holder of this post)

== UK Chief Guides ==
Years	Chief Guide
1910 - 1916	Agnes Baden-Powell
1916 - 1930	Olave Baden-Powell
1930 - 1939	Mrs Percy Birley
1939 - 1942	Mrs St John Atkinson
1942 - 1949	Finola, Lady Somers
1949 - 1956	The Lady Stratheden and Campbell
1956 - 1966	Anstice Gibbs
1966 - 1975	Ann Parker Bowles
1975 - 1980	Sheila Walker
1980 - 1985	Lady Patience Baden-Powell
1985 - 1990	June Paterson-Brown
1990 - 1995	Jane Garside
1995 - 1996	Margaret Wright
1996 - 2001	Bridget Towle
2001 - 2006	Jenny Leach
2006 - 2011	Liz Burnley
2011 - 2016	Gill Slocombe
2016 - 2017	Valerie Le Vaillant
2018 - 2023	Amanda Medler
2023 - present	Tracy Foster

== Austria ==
- Charlotte Teuber-Weckersdorf

== Gambia ==
- Rosamond Fowlis

== See also ==
- Chief Scout (The Scout Association)
