= Heather Baden-Powell =

British Girl Guide personality

Heather Baden-Powell King
- Baden-Powell from a 1939 newspaper
- Born: Heather Grace Baden-Powell; 1 June 1915; Battle, East Sussex, England
- Died: 21 May 1986 (aged 70); Gloucestershire, England
- Other name: Mrs John King
- Education: St James' School, Malvern
- Known for: Guiding and Scouting
- Spouse: John Hall King (m. 1940)
- Children: 2
- Parent(s): Robert Baden-Powell; Olave St. Clair Soames
- Family: George Baden-Powell (uncle); Peter Baden-Powell (brother); Betty Clay (sister)

Heather Baden-Powell King (1 June 1915 – 21 May 1986) was the second child of Lord and Lady Baden-Powell. She was her father's private secretary from the 1930s until his death in 1941. She published Baden-Powell: A Family Album in 1986.

== Childhood ==
The Hon. Heather Grace Baden-Powell was the second of Robert and Olave Baden-Powell's three children. The family home was Pax Hill, Bentley, Hampshire. In March 1916, to celebrate her birth, the Baden-Powells launched a competition between Girl Guide companies. The Guide company with the highest average number of badges per Guide would earn the right to be known as "Heather's Own" Company. The winners – the 3rd Bath Company, with a total of 1,165 badges – were given the Baden-Powell family crest as a badge and a sprig of heather to wear in their hat.

Soon after Heather's birth, she stayed with her maternal grandmother while her mother took up active war work. In 1926, the whole Baden-Powell family travelled to South Africa for an extended trip where all three children were put in a Cape Town school.

She attended St James' School for Girls, Malvern. She was a keen horsewoman, experienced hunter, and was a "capable sculptor". She was presented at court in 1933.

== Adult life ==
In March 1934, her engagement with Lieutenant G E Lennox-Boyd of the Highland Light Infantry was announced. They had met at a Boy Scout rally in Bedfordshire. Their wedding was planned for May, but with just a month to go it was postponed to allow Lennox-Boyd to recover from a car accident. Because of worries about the "indifferent health" of her father, the wedding was set for June. However, in May the marriage was postponed for a second time so that Heather could accompany her parents on a year-long world tour. It was announced that "the couple are still engaged, and the sole reason for the postponement of the wedding is the world tour." However, by October the marriage had been called off.

The Heather Baden-Powell chapter of the Imperial Order Daughters of the Empire was established in Ontario in 1936 and the Heather Baden-Powell chapter of the Children of the Empire in 1938.

During WWII Baden-Powell served as a driver for the Auxiliary Territorial Service in 1939. Her role included driving generals to and from the War Office.

In June 1940 Baden-Powell married John Hall King (1913–2004) of Bath at St Mary's Church, Bentley, Hampshire. Her elderly father was by this time living in Kenya and unable to travel, so she was "given away" by Admiral Bertram Thesiger, the Hampshire Scout commissioner. She had two sons, born in 1942 and 1946.

After the war, her husband was given a permanent commission with the RAF, where he served in Greece between 1947 and 1950 and Norway between 1964 and 1966. In 1967, after he retired from the RAF, they moved to Oxfordshire to farm and train yearling race-horses. They also took part in car rallies in their Jaguar 2.4. She was involved with Riding for the Disabled Association and hosting Pony Club camps. They retired to Little Compton, Warwickshire.

She published Baden-Powell: A Family Album in 1986, a collection of recollections, snapshots, and scrapbooks about her father. She dedicated the book to her oldest son, Michael, who drowned in the Mediterranean in 1966.

Possibly as a result of riding accidents, she had an operation for a brain tumor in 1984, from which she "struggled to recover". When she died, in lieu of flowers, donations were made to the World Chief Guide Memorial Fund.

== Girl Guides ==
Baden-Powell was a Brownie, Guide and Cadet. While accompanying her parents on their world tour in 1934 and 1935, she performed all the secretarial business of the trip. Upon their return to the UK, she accompanied them on many of their national tours and continued to act as her father's private secretary until his death. In 1936 she opened the new Girl Guide Hall in Llanelli, Wales. She attended the 1937 World Scout Jamboree in Vogelenzang, Netherlands and was present at the 1957 9th World Scout Jamboree in Sutton Park.
