= Baden-Powell (book) =

1989 biography by Tim Jeal

- Cover of the Yale edition
- Author: Tim Jeal
- Language: English
- Subject: Biography
- Genre: Non-fiction
- Publisher: Hutchinson (first edition)
- Publication date: 1989
- Media type: Print
- ISBN: 0-09-170670-X (Hutchinson edition)
- OCLC: 20850522
- Dewey Decimal: 369.43/092 B 20
- LC Class: DA68.32.B2 J43 1989

Baden-Powell is a 1989 biography of the 1st Baron Baden-Powell by Tim Jeal. Tim Jeal's work, researched over five years, was first published by Hutchinson in the UK and Yale University Press. It was reviewed by The New York Times. James Casada wrote in a review for Library Journal that it is "a balanced, definitive assessment which so far transcends previous treatments as to make them almost meaningless".

== Sources ==
Although Jeal's earlier biography of David Livingstone had been highly critical, establishing that he had only made a single convert and had failed in many important geographical objectives, Jeal defended Lord Baden-Powell not just against accusations of racism, militarism, but of having starved the Africans at Mafeking and stolen the basic idea for the Boy Scouts. Jeal relied on material from the archives of established Scout organisations and from Baden-Powell's own writings, diaries and private correspondence.

He also interviewed Baden-Powell's daughters and traced, along with Scouting colleagues, his last serving private secretary and many members of his domestic staff still alive in the 1980s. His use of the letters written to Olave Baden-Powell by her favourite niece, Christian Davidson (who lived with the Baden-Powells after her mother's death), enabled him to write in detail about Baden-Powell's relationship with his wife and with his three children. Jeal gives the only detailed account of Baden-Powell's marriage and his tragic relationship with his only son Peter, and his disagreements with his daughters about their marriages.

== Reviews ==
Although Jeal's Baden-Powell "transcends previous treatments" and is exceptionally well referenced, as a "balanced, definitive assessment" it has come under criticism from academics who had earlier charged Lord Baden-Powell with militarism. Several of their books and articles on Baden-Powell had become critical and negative since the 1960s, culminating in Michael Rosenthal's The Character Factory (1986), which added to the charge of militarism one of antisemitism. Jeal rebutted these in his chapters "Character Factory or Helping Hand" (pp. 409–415) and "Baden-Powell and the Dictators" (pp. 543–553). The leading scholar and critic, Ian Buruma (international Erasmus Prize Winner 2008), assessed the relative merits of Jeal's and Rosenthal's arguments in The New York Review of Books; and on the charges that the Boy Scouts had been primarily militaristic in inspiration, and that Baden-Powell had been antisemitic in the 1930s, came down on the side of Jeal's vindications both in his original article "Boys will be Boys" and in his response to Rosenthal's reply. Allen Warren, a historian, and former provost of Vanbrugh College, York University, also supported Jeal's arguments in both fields in a four-page review. Paul Fussell in reviewing Jeal's book in The Times Literary Supplement wrote stressing the civic rather than the military motivation behind Baden-Powell's Boy Scouts and opining that Jeal had done "full justice to Baden-Powell's complexity and contradictions, his military delight and his pacifism, his fondness for groups and his stress on the individual...[and his dictum that] the real way to get happiness is giving out happiness to other people."

=== Sexuality ===
Particular attention in reviews has been given to Jeal's analysis of whether Lord Baden-Powell was homosexual. Jeal devoted the whole of Chapter Three "Men's Man" to the subject of his sexuality and quotes from Baden-Powell's own account of his dreams and also considered many other intimate papers before reaching his conclusion that Baden-Powell had been a repressed rather than an active homosexual. Nelson Block states: "While the professional history community generally considers Jeal's conclusions on this topic to be speculative, the mainstream press seems to have taken them as fact". He then notes that there has been no published scholarly critique of Jeal.

== Content ==
The book comprises 18 introductory pages, and 670 editorial pages. It has 19 chapters, covering Lord Baden-Powell's life from birth and home, to his Indian and African periods, the work he did on Scouting for boys, and his marriage. The text is encyclopedically referenced with over 1,000 notes.

== Editions ==
- Jeal, Tim (1989). Baden-Powell. London: Hutchinson. ISBN 0-09-170670-X.
- — (March 1990). The Boy-Man, The life of Lord Baden-Powell. New York: William Morrow & Company. ISBN 0-688-04899-4.
- — (1991). Baden-Powell. London: Pimlico. ISBN 0-7126-5026-1.
- — (August 2001). Baden-Powell. New Haven: Yale University Press. ISBN 0-300-09103-6.
- — (December 2007). Baden-Powell, Gründer der Pfadfinder (in German). Translated by Cornelius Hartz [in German]. Wesel: Von der Linden-Verlag.
