= World Thinking Day =

Celebration by Girl Guides and Scouts

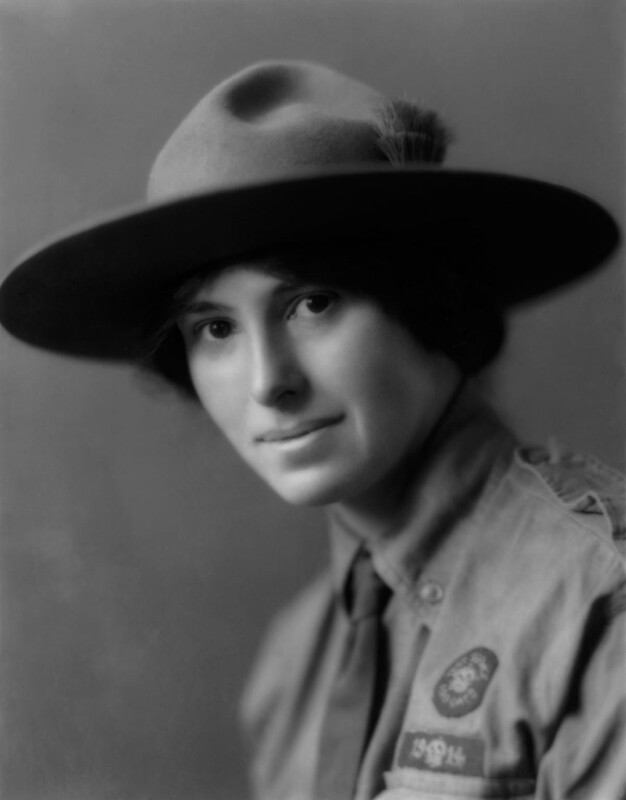
- Lady Baden-Powell

World Thinking Day, formerly Thinking Day, is celebrated annually on 22 February by all Girl Guides and Girl Scouts. It is also celebrated by Scout and Guide organisations around the world. It is a day when they think about their "sisters" (and "brothers") in all the countries of the world, the meaning of Guiding, and its global impact.

Most recently, World Association of Girl Guides and Girl Scouts has selected an important international issue as the theme for each year's World Thinking Day, and selected a focus country from each of their five world regions. Girl Guides and Girl Scouts use these as an opportunity to study and appreciate other countries and cultures, and equally increase awareness and sensitivity on global concerns. Donations are collected for the Thinking Day Fund, which supports projects to help Girl Guides and Scouts around the world.

22 February was chosen as it was the birthday of Scouting and Guiding founder Lord Robert Baden-Powell and of Lady Olave Baden-Powell, his wife and World Chief Guide. Other Scouts celebrate it as B.-P. Day or Founders' Day.

== History ==
In 1926, at the Fourth Girl Scout International Conference, held at Girl Scouts of the United States’s Camp Edith Macy (presently the Edith Macy Conference Center), the conference delegates highlighted the need for a special international day when Girl Guides and Girl Scouts would think about the worldwide spread of Girl Guiding and Girl Scouting, and of all the Girl Guides and Girl Scouts around the world, giving them, their "sisters", thanks and appreciation.

It was decided by the delegates that this day would be 22 February, the birthday of both Lord Baden-Powell, founder of the Boy Scout movement, and Lady Olave Baden-Powell, his wife and the World Chief Guide.

In 1999, at the 30th World Conference, held in Ireland, the name was changed from "Thinking Day" to "World Thinking Day", to emphasize the global aspect of this special day.

== World Thinking Day Fund ==
At the Seventh World Conference in Poland, a Belgian delegate suggested that the girls' appreciation and friendship should not only be shown by the exchange of wishes, but also through presents, which are after all typical of birthdays, in the form of a voluntary contribution to the World Association of Girl Guides and Girl Scouts.

In her first letter about the World Thinking Day Fund Lady Baden-Powell, the World Chief Guide, asked the Girl Guides and Girl Scouts to donate "a penny for your thoughts," in order to support the Movement. The amount raised was £520 12s 6d in 1933, and rose to £35,346 in 1971. The World Thinking Day Fund is used to help more girls and young women around the world by spreading the Girl Guiding/Girl Scouting programme.

== World Thinking Day themes ==
The World Association of Girl Guides and Girl Scouts chooses a theme for each World Thinking Day and proposes related activities. Themes include:

- 2005: "Think about food"
- 2006: "Think about, talk about and do something about adolescent health issues"; often shortened to Think about adolescent health
- 2007: "Discover your potential by taking the lead, growing friendships, and speaking out"; often shortened to Discover your potential
- 2008: "Think about water"
- 2009: UN Millennium Development Goal 6: "Stop the spread of AIDS, malaria and other diseases"; often shortened to Stop the spread of diseases
- 2010: UN Millennium Development Goal 1: Girls worldwide say "Together we can end extreme poverty and hunger".
- 2011: UN Millennium Development Goal 3: Girls worldwide say "Empowering girls will change our world".
- 2012: UN Millennium Development Goal 7: Girls worldwide say “We can save our planet”.
- 2013: UN Millennium Development Goal 4: "Reduce child mortality" and UN Millennium Development Goal 5:"Improve maternal health"
- 2014: UN Millennium Development Goal 2: "Providing universal access to primary education"
- 2015: UN Millennium Development Goal 8: "Developing partnerships for global development"
- 2016: "Connect"
- 2017: "Grow"
- 2018: "Impact"
- 2019: "Leadership"
- 2020: "Living Threads"
- 2021: "Stand Together for Peace"
- 2022: "Our World, Our Equal Future: The environment and gender equality"
- 2023: "Our World, Our Peaceful Future: The environment, peace and security"
- 2024: "Our World, Our Thriving Future: The environment and global poverty"
- 2025: "Our Story: Reflecting the symbolism and values of our Movement"
- 2026: "Our Friendship"
- 2027: "Our People"
- 2028: "Our Future"

== Traditions and activities ==
Every year on 22 February, Rangers from Mona Burgin's Unit in Auckland, New Zealand, set off before dawn, while it is still dark, and they climb to the top of Maungawhau / Mount Eden. There they set up their campfire and a flag-staff, and as the sun rises over the sea they raise the Guide World Flag, they sing the World Song, and they speak of some of the people and the countries they are Thinking about - and so they start "The Big Think" which then travels all the way round the world.

On the nearest weekend to World Thinking Day, Girl Guides and Girl Scouts from across the world come together on ScoutLink to chat with each other and celebrate their Founders. Others are involved with Thinking Day on the Air (TDOTA) using amateur radio, similar to the Jamboree On The Air of the Scout movement.

Some World Association of Girl Guides and Girl Scouts member organisations use it as an opportunity to do projects with their 'twin' organisation, such as Canada and Dominica.

One tradition is that every Scout or Guide, ex-Scout or ex-Guide, places a candle in their window that night at dusk: "This is my little Guiding Light, I'm going to let it shine."

It is also a tradition to send letters or postcards to other Scout and Guides before Thinking Day. In 2009, 2010, 2011, 2012 and 2013 a postcard campaign was organized by the Ring deutscher Pfadfinderverbände, Ring Deutscher Pfadfinderinnenverbände, Lëtzebuerger Guiden a Scouten, Swiss Guide and Scout Movement, Pfadfinder und Pfadfinderinnen Liechtensteins and Pfadfinder und Pfadfinderinnen Österreichs.

== Literature ==
[It was] in Poland [at the 7th World Guide Conference, held in Katowice in 1932] that `Thinking Day' had its origins. A Belgian Guider at the Conference suggested that there should be one day set apart in each year when all of us should think of each other in terms of love and friendship. It could have as vital a power as the Women's World Day of Prayer. There was also a practical suggestion that on `Thinking Day', each Guide throughout the world should contribute `A Penny for Your Thoughts' towards the World Association funds. The Conference paid Robin (her pet-name for her husband) and me the compliment of choosing our joint birthday, 22 February, as Thinking Day. At first the idea hung fire but, one by one, the nations began to promote the scheme. Money began to pour in for the World Association and the totals have risen steadily from £520 12s. 6d. in 1933 to £35,346 in 1970/71 — the last year for which I have the complete figures.

"Far greater than the financial success, however, is the spiritual impact of Thinking Day. A special message I broadcast some years ago gives my assessment of its value: "During the twenty-four hours of 22 February, these kindly, generous thoughts are being thrown out into the ether by Guides who care personally about the preaching of love and goodwill in the world, and these thoughts and prayers are concentrated thus as a live force for the developing of friendship and understanding, for which all peoples are longing.

"Though you cannot visit sister Guides in France or Finland, in Austria or Australia, in Italy or Iceland, Canada or Chile, Ghana or Guatemala, U.S.A. or U.A.R., you can reach out to them there in your MIND. And in this unseen, spiritual way you can give them your uplifting sympathy and friendship. Thus do we Guides, of all kinds and of all ages and of all nations, go with the highest and the best towards the spreading of true peace and goodwill on earth.

— "Window on my Heart" by Olave Lady Baden-Powell with Mary Drewery

== See also ==
- Scouts' Day
