= Hubert Martin =

Hubert Martin may refer to:

- Hubert Jacques Martin (1943–2008), known as Pit Martin, retired Canadian professional ice hockey centre
- Hubert S. Martin (died 1938), first director of the International Bureau of the Scout movement
