= J. S. Wilson =

Chief scout of Japan (1888–1969)

Colonel J. S. Wilson
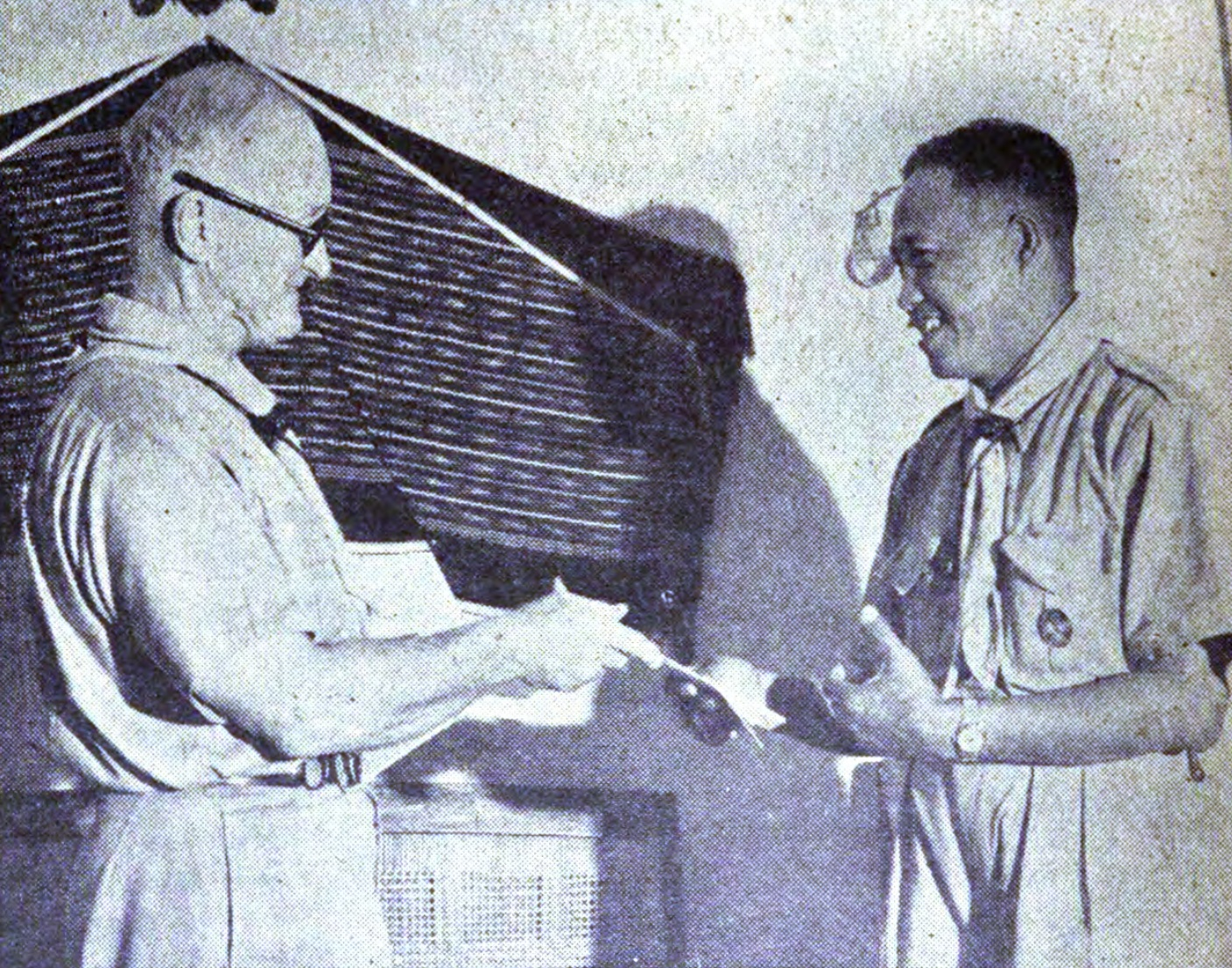
- Wilson (left) granting a charter to Sumardjo of the Indonesian Scouts, 1953

World Organization of the Scout Movement secretary general
- In office 1938–1951
- Preceded by: Hubert S. Martin
- Succeeded by: Daniel Spry

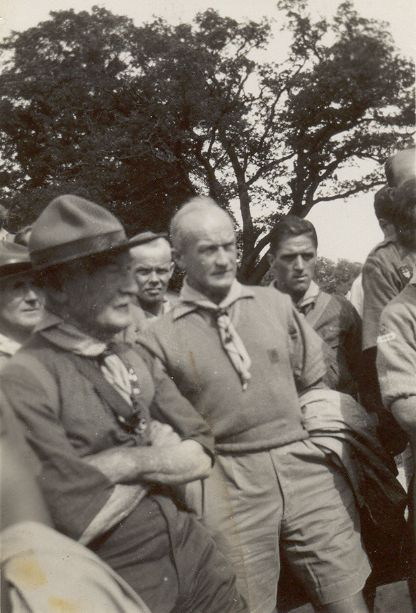
Robert Baden-Powell and J.S. Wilson during the 4th World Jamboree held in Gödöllő, Hungary (1933).

Colonel John Skinner "Belge" Wilson (1888–1969) was a Scottish scouting luminary and friend and contemporary of General Baden-Powell, recruited by him to head the World Organization of the Scout Movement's bureau. Wilson was its acting director from 1938 to 1939, following the death of Hubert S. Martin. He was elected in 1939 and remained in office until 1951. He then became Honorary President of WOSM for four years.

== Scouting ==
Baden-Powell visited India in 1921, where he met and recruited Colonel Wilson, who was then the Calcutta Police senior deputy commissioner and, in his free time, was serving as Calcutta's district Scout commissioner.

Wilson ran The Boy Scouts Association's Gilwell Park in the early 1920s. He served as the Boy Scouts International Conference (later WOSM) bureau director for 15 years, tasked with co-ordinating various Scout movements within countries and between them. After retirement, he served as WOSM's committee honorary president for a further four years.

To encourage the creation of Rovers in the Boy Scouts of America, the first Wood Badge course held in the United States was a Rover Scout Wood Badge course, directed by Wilson.

Wilson introduced the WOSM emblem in 1939, a silver fleur-de-lis or arrowhead badge on a purple background surrounded by the names of the five continents in silver within a circular frame. The wearing of it was confined to past and present members of WOSM's committee and bureau staff. A flag of similar design followed, the flying of which was restricted to international Scout gatherings.

In 1937, WOSM awarded Wilson its Bronze Wolf Award for exceptional services to world Scouting. In 1952 he also received the highest distinction of the Scout Association of Japan, the Golden Pheasant Award. During a visit in Austria in 1957 he was awarded with one of the highest honours of Austrian Scouting the Silbernen Steinbock Silver Capricorn (on red-white-red ribbon).

Wilson took a six-year world tour reviewing the world's Scout organisations, culminating in a five-month tour of Asia in October 1952. In 1957, Colonel Wilson took his research notes gathered on the trip and authored the publication of the first edition of the seminal work on world Scouting, Scouting Round the World.

== Military ==
At the age of 52, Wilson took leave from his WOSM bureau position during World War II, to help select and train candidates for the Special Operations Executive (SOE). Upon learning that Nazi scientists were attempting to build nuclear weapons, Winston Churchill and US President Franklin D. Roosevelt decided that all Nazi efforts in nuclear research must be sabotaged. A key element of Hitler’s nuclear programme was the Norsk Hydro plant in Nazi-occupied Norway, which produced “heavy water”. After a failed attempts to destroy the facility by parachute troops and aerial bombing, ten SOE operatives trained by Wilson were deployed. They successfully parachuted into Norway, evaded capture, scaled a 600ft ice-bound cliff to gain access to the plant, and destroyed the heavy apparatus. A film, "The Heroes of Telemark" was made of the story. For his services, Colonel Wilson was awarded an OBE and made a Commander of the Royal Norwegian Order of St. Olav. His story is detailed in the book ‘Hunting Hitler’s Nukes’ by historian and filmmaker Damien Lewis.

World Organization of the Scout Movement
| Preceded by Hubert S. Martin | Secretary General; 1938–1951 | Succeeded by Daniel Spry |
