= Hubert S. Martin =

British diplomat and Scouting leader

Hubert S. Martin CVO CBE

Boy Scouts International Bureau director
- In office 1920 – 11 February 1938
- Succeeded by: J. S. Wilson

Hubert Stanley Martin CVO CBE (1879 – 17 November 1938) was a British diplomat, an early Boy Scout leader, The Boy Scouts Association of the United Kingdom International Commissioner and the Boy Scouts International Bureau's first director, from 1920 until his death in 1938.

== Life and career ==
Martin was employed by the British Foreign Office in 1898, serving as a King's messenger. He was made Chief Passport Officer in 1916. He was appointed as an officer of the Order of the British Empire (OBE) in 1918 and, in 1920, as a Commander (CBE). for his service during World War I.

Martin formed a Boy Scout troop in London in 1909. He later became an official in The Boy Scouts Association. Martin maintained an independence from and, at times, uneasy relationship with Robert Baden-Powell. He was one of The Boy Scouts Association instructors at the first Wood Badge course held at Gilwell Park, from 8 to 19 September 1919. In 1920, while serving as The Boy Scout Association's International Commissioner, Martin also became the Boy Scouts International Bureau's first director, initially Honorary Director. He established the Bureau's first office at 25 Buckingham Palace Road, London. In late 1923, he verified the French Scouting camp schools of Cappy and Chamarande. In 1937, Martin was awarded the International Committee of the Boy Scout Movement's third Bronze Wolf for exceptional services to world Scouting.

Martin was appointed a Commander of the Royal Victorian Order (CVO) in 1934.

== Works ==
- Scouting in Other Lands, 1926

== See also ==
- World Scout Committee

== Bibliography ==
- Wilson, John S. (1959). Scouting Round the World (First ed.). Blandford Press. p. 203.

World Organization of the Scout Movement
New title	Boy Scouts International Bureau Director; 1920 – 1938	Succeeded by J. S. Wilson
