= Charlotte Teuber-Weckersdorf =

Austrian university professor

Charlotte M. Teuber-Weckersdorf (1 November 1923 – 16 February 1998) was one of the most important Girl Guides Leader of Austria and an Austrian university professor.

== Family ==
Her father was Wilhelm Teuber-Weckersdorf, an Austro-Hungarian officer and educator. He and his brother Emmerich were Scouting pioneers in Austria. In 1909 Wilhelm started one of the first Scouting activities in Austria in a military school in Straß. He served as Chief Scout of the Österreichischer Pfadfinderbund from 1937 until Scouting was banned after the Anschluss in 1938, after World War II he served as Honorary Chief Scout of the Austrian Boy Scouts from 1949 until his death. He was instrumental in the reorganization of Scouting and Guiding after World War II in Austria. So he also served as President of the Girl Guides in Salzburg.

Her mother Irma was born a Jagitsch and Charlotte had one brother named Emmerich.

Her family was catholic-conservative and against Nazism. Her father and her uncle Emmerichwere arrested after the Anschluss.

== Education and career ==
In 1938 Charlotte was not allowed to attend the Gymnasium anymore, because of her pro-Austrian catholic-conservative beliefs and family. During World War II she served within the German Red Cross. In 1945 she took general qualification exams for the university entrance and studied Archaeology and History of art in Innsbruck. In 1956 she took her degrees. She studied Political Science in Harvard and made her master's degree in 1960 and her PhD in 1973. Between 1960 and 1973 she was also a college teacher. From 1982 to 1992 she taught as a visiting professor in the Institute of Political Science of the University of Vienna and worked also after 1992 with students in Vienna. She also worked with the United Nations.

== Girl Guides ==
Because of her father and uncle she soon got involved in Girl Guides. In 1945 she was an important figure in the rebirth of Guiding first in Salzburg and later throughout Austria. In November 1945 she took part in the 1st World Youth Conference in London, where she met several Scout and Guide leaders. In August 1946 she was the leader of the first Austrian Guiders training after World War II in Vorarlberg. In April 1949 Charlotte was responsible for a Leaders training in Innsbruck. She served as International Commissioner of the Austrian Girl Guides. From 1951 to 1957 she served as Austrian Chief Guide. During the 7th World Scout Jamboree and the World Scout Conference in Salzburg Charlotte met Olave Baden-Powell. After the Hungarian Revolution in 1956 she worked with Austrian Ranger and Guiders in the refugee camp in Traiskirchen.
