= Wilhelm Teuber-Weckersdorf =

Austro-Hungarian officer

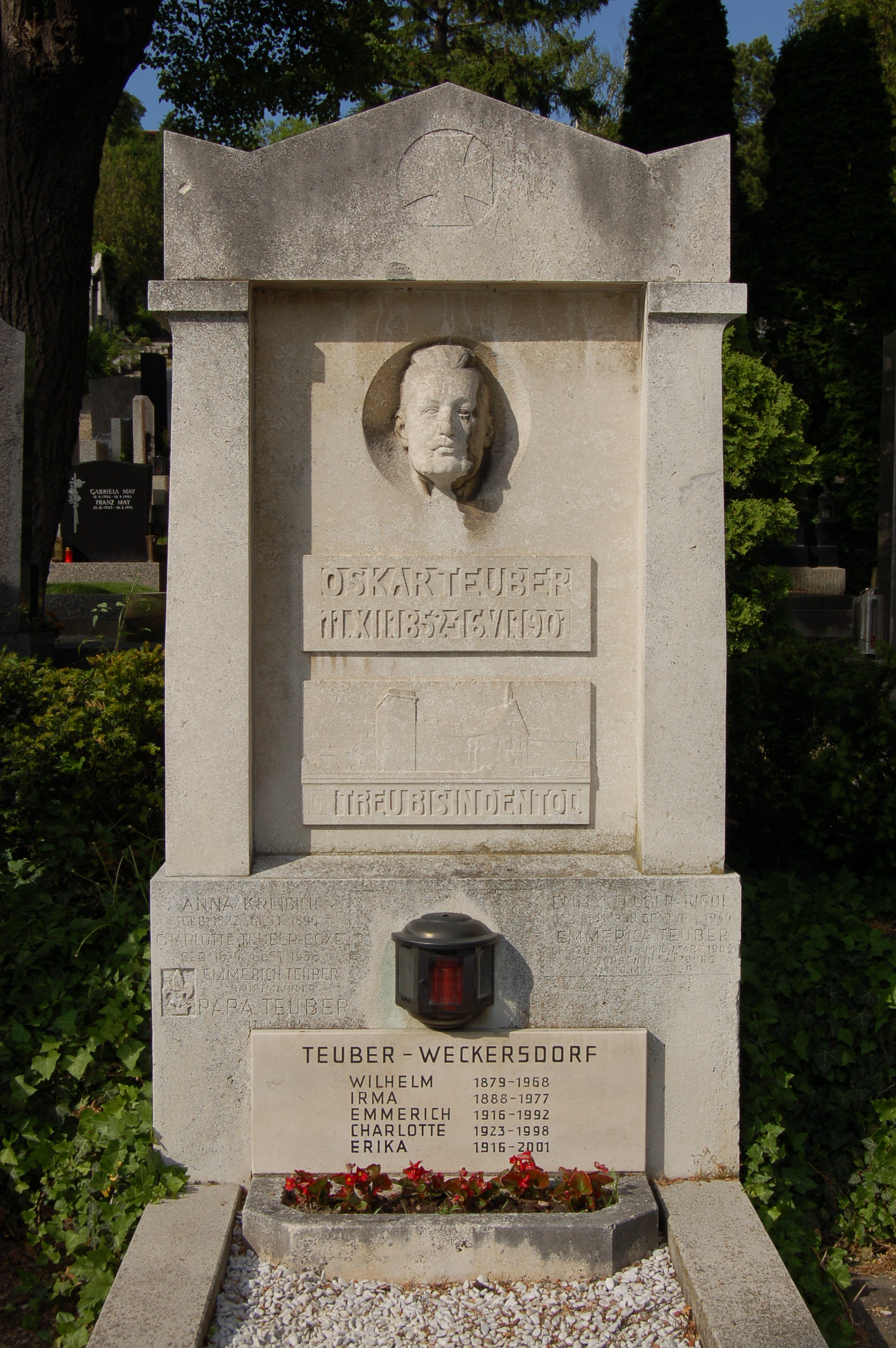
Teuber-Weckersdorf family gravestone

Wilhelm Teuber-Weckersdorf (23 September 1879 in Prague-3 March 1968) was an Austro-Hungarian officer and a Scouting pioneer in Austria, popularly known within the Scouting movement as "Willy Teuber" or "Onkel Teuber".

== Family ==
His father Oskar Wilhelm Karl (11 December 1852, Křinice (German: Weckersdorf)-16 December 1901, Vienna) was a journalist for the Wiener Zeitung in Prague. He was married with Emmy Rigol (10 March 1850-15 Mai 1934, Vienna). Wilhelm had 3 brothers: Emmerich (born 1877), Oscar (born 1881) and Maurus (born 1883).

He was married to Irma Jagitsch and had 2 children: Charlotte and Emmerich.

In 1933 it was allowed to him and his family to use the surnames Weckersdorf, after the birthplace of his father, by the Austrian authorities.

== Education and military service ==
Like his brothers Wilhelm attended the Gymnasium at the Schottenstift in Vienna and joined the Austro-Hungarian Army. Teuber started his military career in the 4th Husars Regiment. Because of his bad health he later served as teacher for Geometry, Mathematics, Geography, service regulations and two more subjects in the rank of an Oberleutnant at the cadet school (Militär-Erziehungs- und Bildungsanstalt) in Straß

=== Scouting ===
There he used Scouting for Boys as a source for ideas for the free time activities for the boys. Starting in 1909 patrols were formed and the first Scouting activities were carried out in Austria. In June 2009 a Centenary Commemoration took place, a stamp and special cachet was issued commemorating the first Scouting activities in Austria. On 23 October 2009 a memorial was erected in Strass commemorating the first Scouting activities in Austria.

In 1912 his brother Emmerich founded one of the first Austrian Scout groups in Vienna. Wilhelm kept in touch with the Austrian Scout movement and served as Chief Scout of the Österreichischer Pfadfinderbund from 1937 until Scouting was banned after the Anschluss in 1938. In 1937 he took part in the 5th World Scout Jamboree in Vogelenzang. In 1945 he founded a Scout association for the western states of Austria, which in 1946 formed together with the Österreichischer Pfadfinderbund and the Catholic Österreichisches Pfadfinderkorps St.Georg a new unified Boy Scout association "Pfadfinder Österreichs". He served as Honorary Chief Scout of this association until his death. In June 1947 he became President of the Girl Guides of Salzburg. Wilhelm took part in the 7th World Scout Jamboree in Bad Ischl. During the Jamboree he was awarded with the "Flying Condor in Silver" by the Boy Scouts of Chile.

=== World War I ===
During the war he served at the Military Command of Vienna. His last rank was Oberst and in 1918 he retired.

== Further life ==
From 1934 to 1938 he served as a district leader of the Vaterländische Front. In 1938 he was arrested after the Anschluss, because he was a catholic-conservative, against Nazism and because of his involvement in Austrian Scouting.Before the Anschluss Wilhelm and his brother Emmerich asked all Scoutleaders and Old Scouts to vote for Austria at the planned referendum. Between 1938 and 1945 Wilhelm tried to keep the spirit of Scouting alive and stayed in contact with several Austrian Scouters. After World War II Wilhelm worked as head of the department for industries of the Regional government of Salzburg. In 1957 Oberst a.D. Wilhelm Teuber-Weckersdorf was among the founder members of the Salzburg branch of the Austrian Officers' Association.
