= Tim Jeal =

British biographer of notable Victorians (1945–2026)

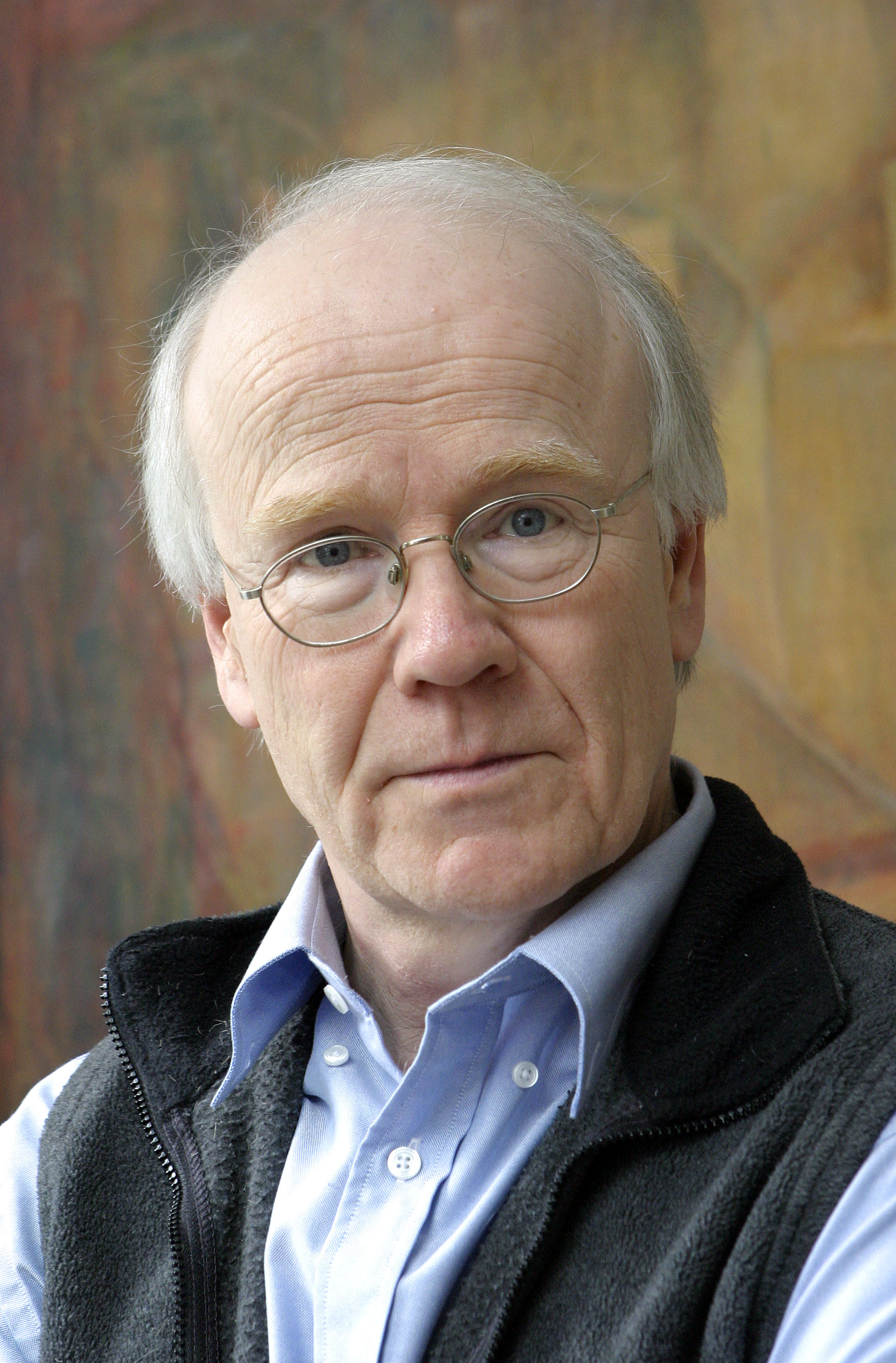
- Jeal in 2006
- Born: 27 January 1945; London, England
- Died: 5 August 2026 (aged 81)
- Occupations: Novelist, biographer
- Writing career
- Period: 1960s–2026
- Genres: Fiction; biography
- Subject: Notable Victorian men
- Notable work: Baden-Powell

John Julian Timothy Jeal (27 January 1945 – 5 August 2026) was a British biographer of notable Victorians and a novelist. His publications included a memoir and biographies of David Livingstone (1973), Lord Baden-Powell (1989), and Sir Henry Morton Stanley (2007).

== Background ==
Tim Jeal was born in London on 27 January 1945, to civil servant Clifford Freeman Jeal and Norah Margaret Sabine, daughter of Sir Thomas Edward Sabine Pasley, 3rd Baronet, and Constance Wilmot Annie Hastings, daughter of the 14th Earl of Huntingdon. Jeal was educated at Westminster School, London, and Christ Church, Oxford. Clifford Jeal, about whom his son published a memoir in 2004, was a Christian mystic and follower of the Anglican Order Of The Cross fellowship and as such practised pacifism and vegetarianism.

He was married to Joyce Jeal and they had three daughters. Tim Jeal died on 4 August 2026, aged 81.

== Career ==
=== Television ===
From 1966 to 1970, he worked for BBC Television in the features group.

=== Writing ===
Jeal wrote books from the 1960s, for London and New York-based publishers. Although most of his works were fictional, he is best known for his biographies.

His biography, Livingstone (1973), based on private letters, diaries and archives, was the first to describe the explorer/missionary's faults and failings and to reveal the man behind the icon. It became the basis for a BBC TV documentary and a film for the Discovery Channel. Livingstone has never been out of print since first publication in 1973 and in 2013 was reissued in a revised and expanded edition by Yale University Press.

In Baden-Powell (1989), Jeal offers a revisionist account of Lieutenant-General The 1st Baron Baden-Powell, founder of the Boy Scouts, restoring his reputation which had deteriorated during the 20th century. However, Jeal also speculated that Lord Baden-Powell was a repressed homosexual, and this sparked a great deal of attention in the popular press culminating in scouting organisations reissuing an earlier biography of Baden-Powell by William Hillcourt to dilute attention and sales of Jeal's book. In 1995, Jeal's book was the basis for a TV documentary in the Channel 4 series Secret Lives entitled Lord Baden-Powell: The Boy Man.

The 2007 biography of Sir Henry Morton Stanley was a revisionist account that showed Stanley in a more sympathetic light. Professor John Carey in The Sunday Times accepted that Jeal's "ardent, intricate defence of a man history has damned" had been successful, and concluded: "Anyone who, after reading this book, imagines they would have behaved better than Stanley, if faced with the same dangers, must have a vivid imagination."

Tim Gardam said in The Observer that Jeal had "fulfilled a mission to rehabilitate one of the most complex heroes of Victorian Britain". Kevin Rushby in The Guardian said he was "aware of the dangers of revisionism" and doubted that Stanley was as innocent as Jeal argued. While calling Stanley "an awesome piece of scholarship executed with page-turning brio", he expressed doubt that it would be the "last word on Henry Morton Stanley". In The Washington Post, Jason Roberts wrote of "this commanding, definitive biography" being "an unalloyed triumph"; and in the New York Times Book Review, Paul Theroux described it as "the most felicitous, the best informed, the most complete and readable" biography of Stanley.

He had unique access to the massive Stanley collection in the Royal Museum of Central Africa in Brussels and saw many letters, diaries and other documents (including correspondence between Stanley and King Leopold II of the Belgians) unseen by previous biographers. The book had its detractors. Kenyan law professor Makau Mutua said "If Jeal's attempt was the resurrection of a humane Stanley, then I must judge him a complete failure", going on to suggest that "the author should have set aside any biased personal agendas and let history speak for itself. Instead, Jeal writes a political book in defence of a historical monster."

Explorers of the Nile: The Triumph and Tragedy of a Great Victorian Adventure (2011) is about the search for the source of the Nile by John Hanning Speke, James Augustus Grant, Richard Francis Burton, Samuel White Baker, Henry Morton Stanley, David Livingstone and many others from 1856-1878. It is particularly focused on John Hanning Speke, seeking to restore his reputation, who is credited with unraveling the mystery of the source. Jeal has pitched the book as an update to Alan Moorehead's The White Nile.

== Bibliography ==
=== Fiction ===
- For Love or Money (1967)
- Somewhere Beyond Reproach (1968)
- Cushing's Crusade (1974)
- Until the Colours Fade (1976)
- A Marriage of Convenience (1979)
- The Adventures of Madelene and Louisa, editor (1980)
- Carnforth's Creation (1983)
- For God or Glory (1996) US; published in UK as The Missionary's Wife (1997)
- Deep Water (2000)

=== Non-fiction ===
- Livingstone (1973)
- Baden-Powell (1989)
- Swimming with My Father (2004) (memoir)
- Stanley: The Impossible Life of Africa's Greatest Explorer (2007)
- Explorers of the Nile: The Triumph and Tragedy of a Great Victorian Adventure (2011)

== Awards and honours ==
- 1973 New York Times Notable Book of the Year selection for Livingstone
- 1975 John Llewellyn Rhys Prize winner for Cushing's Crusade
- 1989 New York Times Notable Book of the Year selection for Baden-Powell.
- 2004 PEN/Ackerley Prize shortlist for Swimming with my Father
- 2007 Los Angeles Times Book Prize (Biography) finalist for Stanley: The Impossible Life of Africa’s Greatest Explorer
- 2007 The Sunday Times "Biography of the Year" winner for Stanley: The Impossible Life of Africa’s Greatest Explorer
- 2007 National Book Critics Circle Award (Biography) winner for Stanley: The Impossible Life of Africa’s Greatest Explorer
