= Rosamond Fowlis =

Gambian educator (1910–1994)

Rosamond Arorunkah Fowlis MBE
- Born: 3 October 1910; Bathurst
- Died: 20 August 1994
- Occupation: Teacher

Rosamond Arorunkah Fowlis MBE (3 October 1910 – 20 August 1994) was a Gambian schoolteacher, domestic science organizer, Girl Guides commissioner and chair of the Gambia Women's Federation.

== Life ==
Rosamond Fowlis was born in Bathurst (now Banjul) on 3 October 1910. She was the daughter of Henry G. Fowlis, a prominent member of the Aku Methodist community. She was educated at the Methodist Girls' High School in Bathurst, and from 1943 to 1947 at St Joseph's Convent, Freetown, Sierra Leone. Fowlis taught domestic science in Bathurst from 1931 until her retirement in 1965. A cofounder of the Gambia Teachers' Union in 1937, she served as union president from 1941 to 1945.

A 1943 report on Infant and Girls Education in the Gambia recommended that Fowlis be provided an assistant, and given the opportunity to visit the United Kingdom for additional training. From 1945 to 1965 she was Domestic Science Organizer in the Colony.

Fowlis was appointed to the Gambia Education Board in 1945, and in 1953 was one of the five women on the 34-member Consultative Committee to the Governor on Constitutional Reform. That year she received a MBE for her services as Domestic Science Organizer. In 1955 she became the first Gambian chief guide commissioner, spreading the Girl Guides movement in the Gambian Colony. She served as chair of the Gambia Women's Federation in the 1960s.

In honour of the 75th Anniversary of Girl Guides, Rosamond Fowlis was commemorated on a 1985 stamp as 'Miss Rosamond Fowlis of Buckingham Palace.' She died 20 August 1994.

== Awards ==
In 1953 she was appointed a Member of the Order of the British Empire. For her work with the Girl Guides she was awarded the honorary title of Life President of the Girl Guides Association in 1963. In 1991, she received the Order of the Republic of The Gambia (Member).

In 1985, she was honored with a postage stamp to mark the 75th anniversary of the Girl Guides.
