= Robert Baden-Powell, 1st Baron Baden-Powell =

British soldier and founder of The Scout Association (1857–1941)

Lieutenant-General The Right Honourable The Lord Baden-Powell OM GCMG GCVO KCB KStJ DL
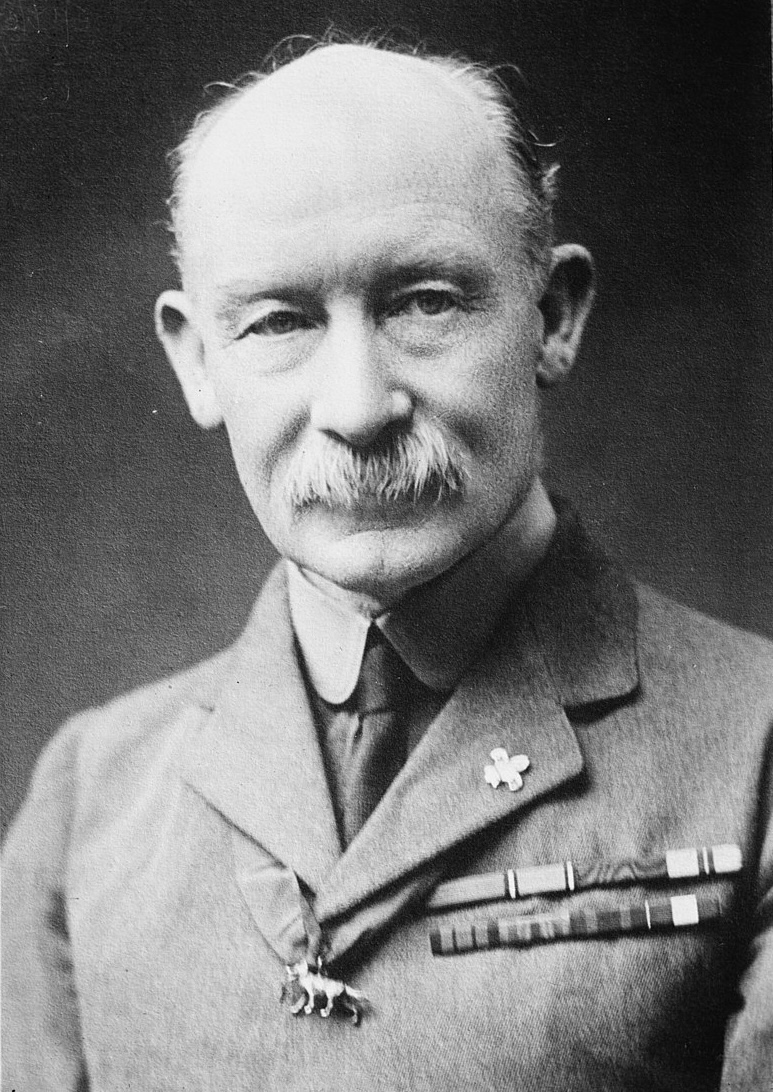
- Baden-Powell in scout uniform, c. 1910–1920
- Born: 22 February 1857; Paddington, London, England
- Died: 8 January 1941 (aged 83); Nyeri, Kenya Colony
- Burial place: St Peter's Cemetery, Nyeri, Kenya; 0.418968°S 36.950117°E
- Spouse: Olave St Clair Soames (m. 1912)
- Children: Arthur Robert Peter Baden-Powell; Heather Grace Baden-Powell; Betty St Clair Baden-Powell
- Relatives: Baden Powell (father)
- Military career
- Allegiance: United Kingdom
- Branch: British Army
- Service years: 1876–1910
- Rank: Lieutenant-General
- Nickname: B-P
- Commands: Inspector General of Cavalry (1903); 5th Dragoon Guards (1897)
- Conflicts: Anglo-Ashanti wars; Second Matabele War; Siege of Mafeking; Second Boer War
- Awards: Member of the Order of Merit; Knight Grand Cross of the Order of St Michael and St George; Knight Grand Cross of the Royal Victorian Order; Knight Commander of the Order of the Bath; Boy Scouts Association Silver Wolf; Boy Scouts of America Silver Buffalo Award; Boy Scouts International Committee Bronze Wolf Award; Wateler Peace Prize
- Other work: Founder of The Scout Association; writer; artist

Lieutenant-General Robert Stephenson Smyth Baden-Powell, 1st Baron Baden-Powell (Note: /ˈbeɪdən ˈpoʊəl/ BAY-dən POH-əl) (22 February 1857 – 8 January 1941), was a British Army officer, writer, founder of The Boy Scouts Association and its first Chief Scout, and founder, with his sister Agnes, of The Girl Guides Association. Baden-Powell wrote Scouting for Boys, which with his previous books – such as his 1884 Reconnaissance and Scouting and his 1899 Aids to Scouting for N.-C.Os and Men, which was intended for the military, and The Scout magazine – helped the rapid growth of the Scout Movement.

Educated at Charterhouse School, Baden-Powell served in the British Army from 1876 until 1910 in India and Africa. In 1899, during the Second Boer War in South Africa, Baden-Powell defended the town in the Siege of Mafeking. His books, written for military reconnaissance and scout training, were also read by boys and used by teachers and youth organisations. In August 1907, he held an experimental camp, the Brownsea Island Scout camp to test his ideas for training boys in scouting. He wrote Scouting for Boys, published in 1908 by C. Arthur Pearson Limited, for boy readership. In 1910, Baden-Powell retired from the army and formed The Scout Association.

In 1909, a rally of Scouts was held at The Crystal Palace. Many girls in Scout uniform attended and, in front of the press, a small group told Baden-Powell that they were the "Girl Scouts". In 1910, Baden-Powell and his sister Agnes started The Girl Guides Association. In 1912, Baden-Powell married Olave St Clair Soames. He gave guidance to The Scout Association and Girl Guides Association until retiring in 1937. Baden-Powell lived his last years in Nyeri, Kenya, where he died and was buried in 1941. His grave is a national monument.

== Early life ==
Baden-Powell was the second youngest son of Baden Powell, the Savilian Professor of Geometry at the University of Oxford and Church of England priest, and his third wife, Henrietta Grace née Smyth, eldest daughter of Admiral William Henry Smyth. After his father died in 1860, his mother, to identify her children with her late husband's fame, styled the family name Baden-Powell. The name was eventually legally changed by Royal Licence on 30 April 1902. Baden-Powell's father's family originated in Suffolk. His mother's earliest known Smyth ancestor was a Royalist American colonist; her mother's father Thomas Warington was the British Consul in Naples around 1800.

Baden-Powell was born Robert Stephenson Smyth Powell at 6 Stanhope Street (now 11 Stanhope Terrace), Paddington, London, on 22 February 1857. He was called Stephe (pronounced "Stevie") by his family. He was named after his godfather, Robert Stephenson, the railway and civil engineer, and his third name was his mother's surname. Baden-Powell had four older half-siblings from the second of his father's two previous marriages and was the fifth surviving child of his father's third marriage:

- Warington (1847–1921)
- George (1847–1898)
- Augustus ("Gus") (1849–1863), who was often ill and died young
- Francis ("Frank") (1850–1933)
- Henrietta Smyth (28 October 1851 – 9 March 1854)
- John Penrose Smyth (21 December 1852 – 14 December 1855)
- Jessie Smyth (25 November 1855 – 24 July 1856)
- Robert (22 February 1857 – 8 January 1941)
- Agnes (1858–1945)
- Baden (1860–1937)

The three children immediately preceding Baden-Powell had all died very young before he was born, so there was a seven-year gap between him and his next older brother Frank; so he and his two younger siblings were almost like a separate family, of which he was the eldest. His father died when Baden-Powell was three, so he was raised by his single mother, a strong woman who was determined that her children would succeed. In 1933, he said of her, "The whole secret of my getting on, lay with my mother."

Baden-Powell attended Rose Hill School, Tunbridge Wells, and was given a scholarship to Charterhouse, a prestigious public school named after the ancient Carthusian monastery buildings it occupied in the City of London. While he was a pupil there, the school moved out to new purpose-built premises in the countryside near Godalming in Surrey. He played with dolls and learnt the piano and violin, was an ambidextrous artist, and enjoyed acting. Holidays were spent on yachting or canoeing expeditions with his brothers. Baden-Powell's first introduction to outdoor skills was through stalking and cooking game while avoiding teachers in the nearby woods, which were strictly out-of-bounds.

== Military career ==
In 1876, Baden-Powell joined the 13th Hussars in India with the rank of lieutenant. In 1880 he was charged with the task of drawing maps of the Battle of Maiwand. He enhanced and honed his military scouting skills amidst the Zulu in the early 1880s in the Natal Province of South Africa, where his regiment had been posted, and where he was mentioned in dispatches. In 1890, he was brevetted Major as military secretary and senior aide-de-camp to the Commander-in-Chief and Governor of Malta, his uncle General Sir Henry Augustus Smyth. He was posted to Malta for three years, also working as an intelligence officer for the Mediterranean for the Director of Military Intelligence. He wrote that he once travelled disguised as a butterfly collector, incorporating plans of military installations into his drawings of butterfly wings. In 1884 he published Reconnaissance and Scouting.

Baden-Powell returned to Africa in 1896, and served in the Second Matabele War, in the expedition to relieve British South Africa Company personnel under siege in Bulawayo. This was a formative experience for him not only because he commanded reconnaissance missions into enemy territory in the Matopos Hills, but because many of his later Boy Scout ideas took hold here. It was during this campaign that he first met and befriended the American scout Frederick Russell Burnham, who introduced Baden-Powell to stories of the American Old West and woodcraft (i.e., Scoutcraft), and here that he was introduced to Montana Peaked version of a western cowboy hat, of which Stetson was a prolific manufacturer, and which also came to be known as a campaign hat and the many versatile and practical uses of a neckerchief.

Baden-Powell was accused of illegally executing a prisoner of war in 1896, the Matabele chief Uwini, who had been promised his life would be spared if he surrendered. Uwini was sentenced to be shot by firing squad by a military court, a sentence Baden-Powell confirmed. Baden-Powell was cleared by a military court of inquiry, but the colonial civil authorities wanted a civil investigation and trial. Baden-Powell later claimed he was "released without a stain on my character".

After Rhodesia, Baden-Powell served in the Fourth Ashanti War on the Gold Coast. In 1897, at the age of 40, he was brevetted colonel (the youngest colonel in the British Army) and given command of the 5th Dragoon Guards in India. A few years later he wrote a small manual, entitled Aids to Scouting, a summary of lectures he had given on the subject of military scouting, much of it a written explanation of the lessons he had learned from Burnham, to help train recruits.

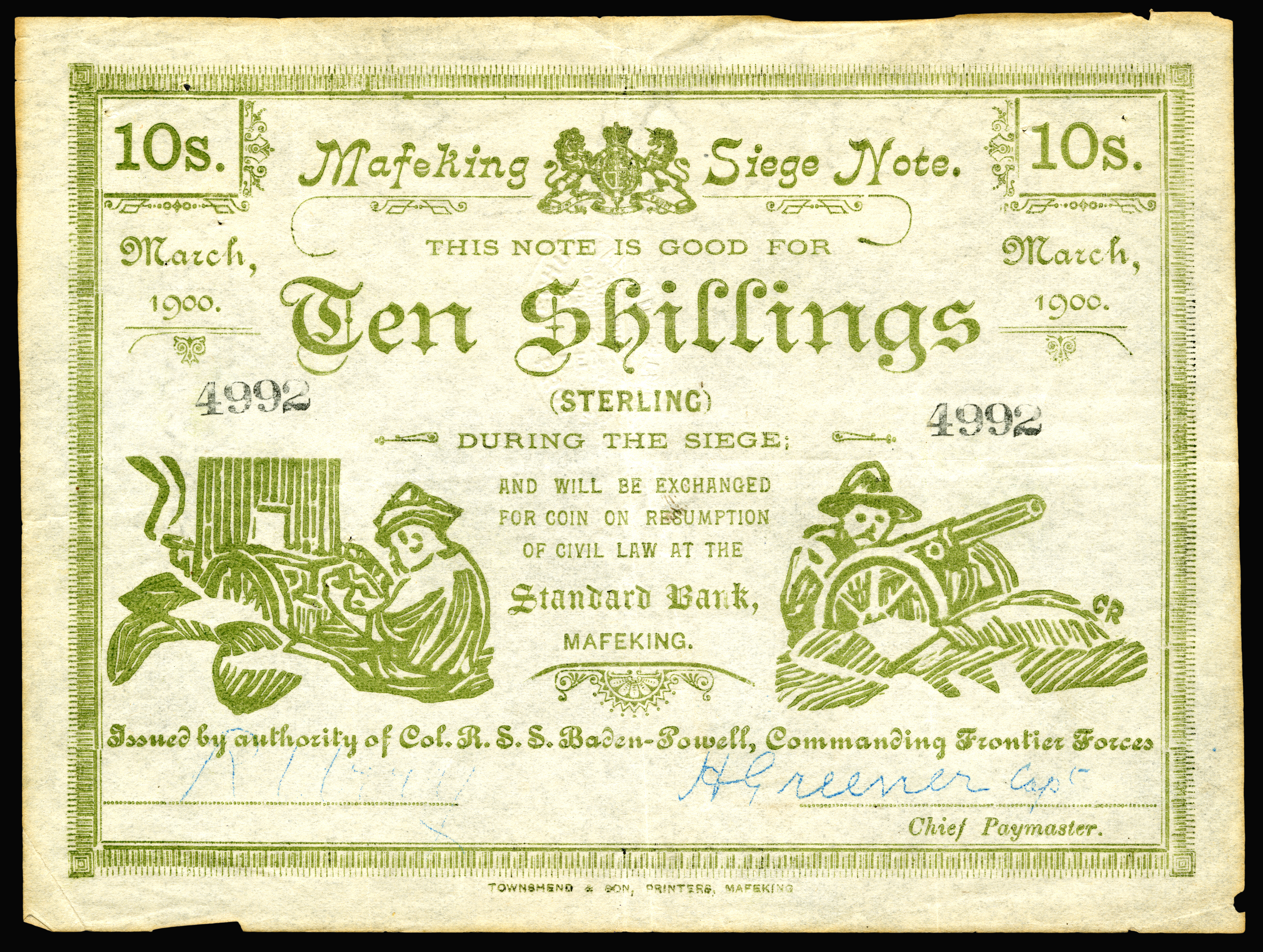
Siege of Mafeking, 10 shillings (1900), Second Boer War currency issued by authority of Colonel Robert Baden-Powell

== Mafeking ==
Baden-Powell returned to South Africa before the Second Boer War. In July 1899, under orders from Sir John Ardagh, Major A. E. Latham from the South African section of the Intelligence Department tasked Baden-Powell to travel to Mafeking to collect intelligence on the Boers at the border with Transvaal. Although instructed to maintain a mobile mounted force on the frontier with the Boer Republics, Baden-Powell amassed stores and established a garrison at Mafeking. The subsequent Siege of Mafeking lasted 217 days. Although Baden-Powell could have destroyed his stores and had sufficient forces to break out throughout much of the siege, especially since the Boers lacked adequate artillery to shell the town or its forces, he remained in the town to the point of his intended mounted soldiers eating their horses. The town had been surrounded by a Boer army, at times above 8,000 men.

The siege of the small town received much attention from both the Boers and international media because Lord Edward Cecil, the son of the British Prime Minister, was besieged in the town. The garrison held out until relieved, in part thanks to cunning deceptions, many devised by Baden-Powell. Fake minefields were planted and his soldiers pretended to avoid non-existent barbed wire while moving between trenches. Baden-Powell did much reconnaissance work himself. In one instance, noting that the Boers had not removed the rail line, Baden-Powell loaded an armoured locomotive with sharpshooters and sent it down the rails into the heart of the Boer encampment and back again in a successful attack.

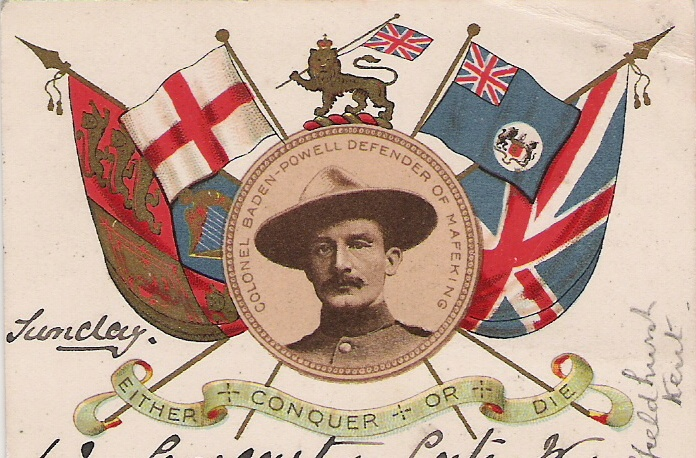
Baden-Powell on a patriotic postcard in 1900

A view expressed by historian Thomas Pakenham of Baden-Powell's actions during the siege argued that his success in resisting the Boers was secured at the expense of the lives of the native African soldiers and civilians, including members of his own African garrison. Pakenham claimed that Baden-Powell drastically reduced the rations to the native garrison. By 2001, after subsequent research, Pakenham changed this view.

During the siege, the Mafeking Cadet Corps of white boys below fighting age stood guard, carried messages, assisted in hospitals and so on, freeing grown men to fight. Baden-Powell did not form the Cadet Corps himself, and there is no evidence that he took much notice of them during the Siege; however, he was sufficiently impressed with both their courage and the equanimity with which they performed their tasks to use them later as an object lesson in the first chapter of Scouting for Boys.

The siege was lifted on 17 May 1900. Baden-Powell was promoted to major-general and became a national hero; however, British military commanders were more critical of his performance and even less impressed with his subsequent choices to again allow himself to be besieged. Ultimately, his failure to understand properly the situation, and abandonment of the soldiers, mostly Australians and Rhodesians, at the Battle of Elands River Pakenham claimed led to his being removed from action.

== After Mafeking ==
Briefly back in the United Kingdom in October 1901, Baden-Powell was invited to visit King Edward VII at Balmoral, the monarch's Scottish retreat, and personally invested as Companion of the Order of the Bath (CB). Baden-Powell was given the role of organising the South African Constabulary, a colonial police force; during this phase, Baden-Powell was sent to Britain on sick leave, so he was only in command for seven months.

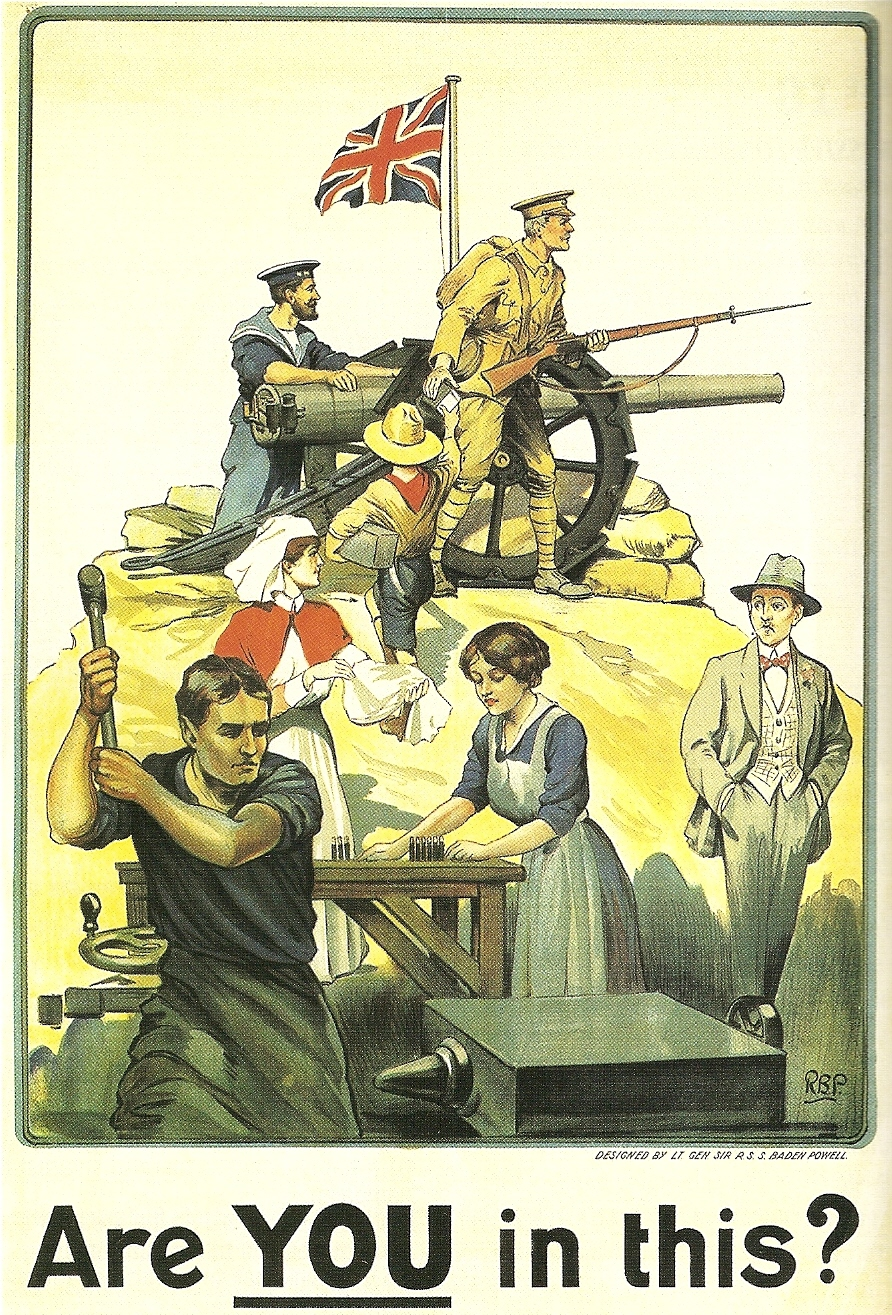
A World War I propaganda poster drawn by Baden-Powell

Baden-Powell returned to England on the SS Kinfauns Castle in March 1903 to take up the post of Inspector-General of Cavalry two months later, on 7 May 1903. While holding this position, he was instrumental in reforming reconnaissance training in British cavalry, giving the force an important advantage in scouting ability over continental rivals. Baden-Powell was a career cavalryman but realised that cavalry was no match against the machine gun; however, his superiors, Kitchener and French, the latter also a career cavalryman, still regarded the cavalry as indispensable, with the result that cavalry was used in the First World War with little effect, yet the major item exported from Britain to Flanders during the War was horse fodder.

In 1907, Baden-Powell was promoted to Lieutenant-General but put on the inactive list. On 1 April 1908, he was appointed to the command of the Northumbrian Division of the newly formed Territorial Force (TF). During this appointment, Baden-Powell selected the location of Catterick Garrison to replace Richmond Castle which was then the Headquarters of the Northumbrian Division.

On 19 February 1909, facing censure for his public comments about Germany as an enemy, Baden-Powell abruptly sailed in the SS Aragon via Portugal and Spain to South America. The Belfast Newsletter reported that when in March 1909 he visited Santiago de Chile for three days, "He was given a warmer reception than had ever been afforded a foreigner in South America." He sailed back in the RMS Danube by 1 May 1909. In 1910, aged 53, Baden-Powell was retired from the Army. In 1915, Baden-Powell's book "My Adventures as a Spy" was published, lending to false suggestions he had been active as a spy during the war.

== Scout Movement ==
Pronunciation of Baden-Powell
/ˈbeɪdən ˈpoʊəl/ BAY-dən POH-əl

Man, matron, maiden,
Please call it Baden.
Further for Powell,
Rhyme it with Noel

— Verse by B-P

On his return from Africa in 1903, Baden-Powell found that his military training manual, Aids to Scouting, had become a best-seller, and was being used by teachers and youth organisations, including Charlotte Mason's House of Education. Following his involvement in the Boys' Brigade as a Brigade vice-president and officer in charge of its scouting section, with encouragement from Sir William Alexander Smith, Baden-Powell decided to re-write Aids to Scouting to suit a youth readership. In August 1907, he held a camp on Brownsea Island to test out his ideas. About twenty boys attended: eight from local Boys' Brigade companies, and about twelve public school boys, mostly sons of his friends.

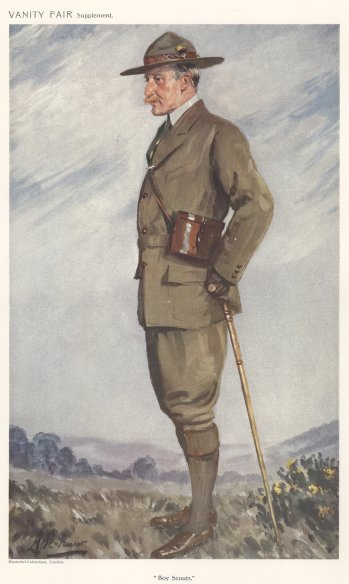
Captioned "Boy Scouts", caricature of Baden-Powell in Vanity Fair, April 1911

Baden-Powell was influenced by Ernest Thompson Seton, who founded the Woodcraft Indians. Seton gave Baden-Powell a copy of his book The Birch Bark Roll of the Woodcraft Indians and they met in 1906. Baden-Powell's Scouting for Boys was published in six installments in 1908 and has sold approximately 150 million copies as the fourth best-selling book of the 20th century.

Boys, as well as girls, spontaneously formed Scout troops. The Scout Movement had started by itself, first as a national, and soon an international phenomenon. A rally of Scouts was held at Crystal Palace in London in 1909, at which Baden-Powell met some of the first Girl Scouts of whom 6,000 had already been registered as Scouts. In 1910, Baden-Powell and his sister, Agnes Baden-Powell, formed The Girl Guides Association. In 1912, Baden-Powell started a world tour with a voyage to the Caribbean. Another passenger was Juliette Gordon Low, an American who had been running a Guide Company in Scotland and was returning to the U.S.A. Baden-Powell encouraged her to found the Girl Scouts of the USA.

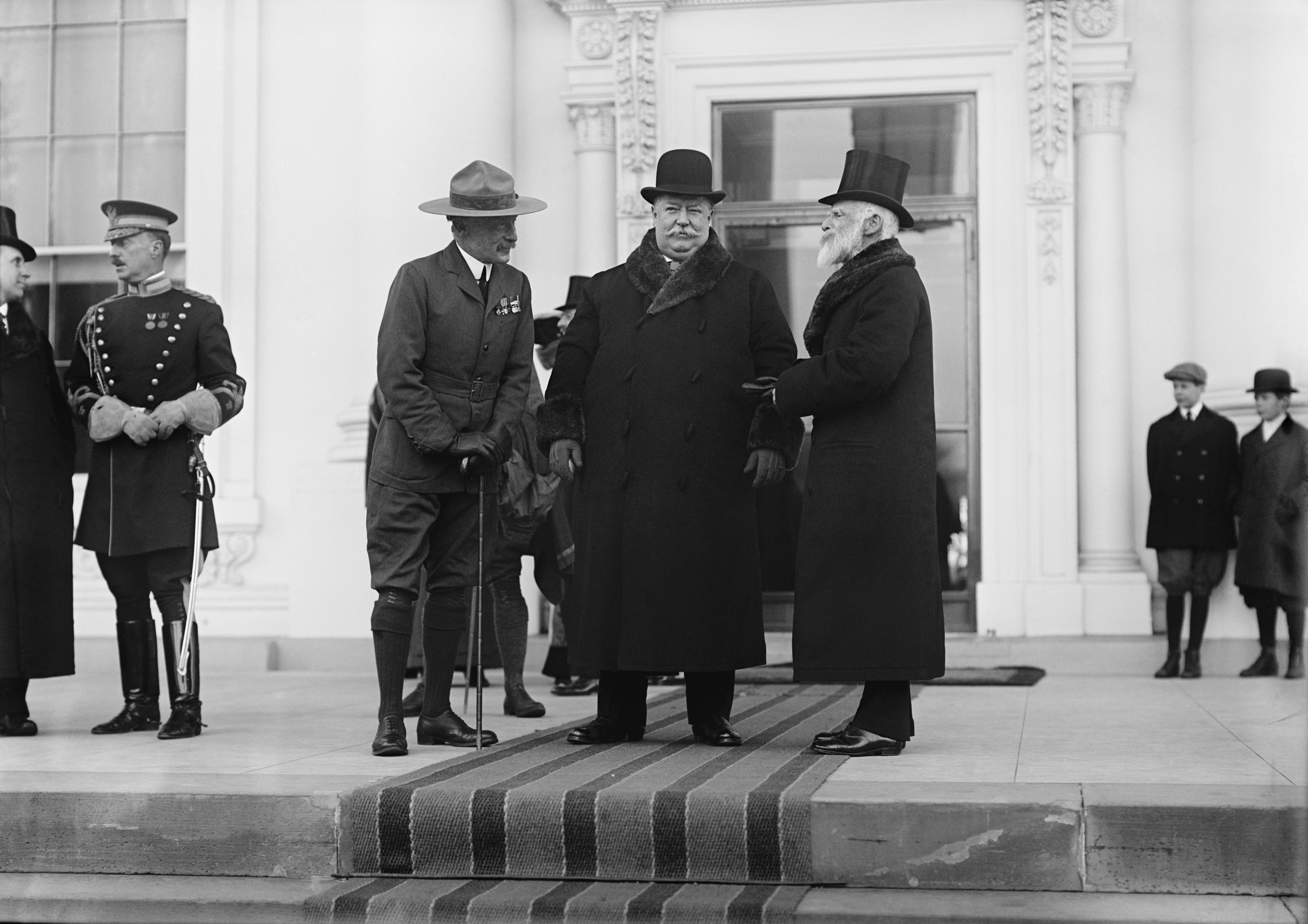
Reviewing the Boy Scouts of Washington, D.C., from the portico of the White House: Baden-Powell, President Taft, British ambassador Bryce (1912)

In 1929, during the 3rd World Scout Jamboree, he received as a present a new 20-horsepower Rolls-Royce car (chassis number GVO-40, registration OU 2938) and an Eccles Caravan. This combination well served the Baden-Powells in their further travels around Europe. The caravan was nicknamed Eccles and is now on display at Gilwell Park. The car, nicknamed Jam Roll, was sold after his death by Olave Baden-Powell in 1945. Jam Roll and Eccles were reunited at Gilwell for the 21st World Scout Jamboree in 2007 and it has been purchased by a charity, B–P Jam Roll Ltd. Funds are being raised to repay the loan that was used to purchase the car. Baden-Powell also had impacts on youth education. By 1922, there were more than a million Scouts in 32 countries; by 1939, the number of Scouts was over 3.3 million.

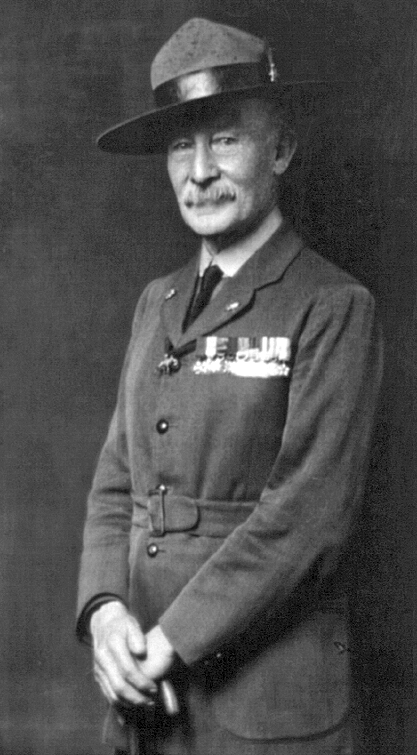
Baden-Powell in 1919

Early Scout Association "Thanks badges" (from 1911) and The Scout Association "Medal of Merit" badge had a swastika symbol on them. This was undoubtedly influenced by the use by Rudyard Kipling of the swastika on the jacket of his published books, including The Jungle Book, which was used by Baden-Powell as a basis for the Wolf Cubs. The swastika had been a symbol of luck in India long before being adopted by the Nazi Party in 1920, and when Nazi use of the swastika became more widespread, the Scouts stopped using it.

Nazi Germany banned Scouting, a competitor to the Hitler Youth, in June 1934, seeing it as "a haven for young men opposed to the new State". Based on the regime's view of Scouting as a dangerous espionage organisation, Baden-Powell's name was included in "The Black Book", a 1940 secret list of people to be detained following the planned conquest of the United Kingdom. A drawing by Baden-Powell depicts Scouts assisting refugees fleeing from the Nazis and Hitler. Tim Jeal, the author of the biography Baden-Powell, gives his opinion that "Baden-Powell's distrust of communism led to his implicit support, through naïveté, of fascism", an opinion based on two of Baden-Powell's diary entries. Baden-Powell met Benito Mussolini on 2 March 1933, and in his diary described him as "small, stout, human and genial. Told me about Balilla and workmen's outdoor recreations which he imposed through 'moral force'." On 17 October 1939, Baden-Powell wrote in his diary: "Lay up all day. Read Mein Kampf. A wonderful book, with good ideas on education, health, propaganda, organisation etc. – and ideals which Hitler does not practice himself."

At the 5th World Scout Jamboree in 1937, Baden-Powell gave his farewell to Scouting and retired from public Scouting life. 22 February, the joint birthday of Robert and Olave Baden-Powell, continues to be marked as Founder's Day by Scouts and World Thinking Day by Guides to remember and celebrate the work of the Chief Scout and Chief Guide of the World. In his final letter to the Scouts, Baden-Powell wrote:

I have had a most happy life and I want each one of you to have a happy life too. I believe that God put us in this jolly world to be happy and enjoy life. Happiness does not come from being rich, nor merely being successful in your career, nor by self-indulgence. One step towards happiness is to make yourself healthy and strong while you are a boy, so that you can be useful and so you can enjoy life when you are a man. Nature study will show you how full of beautiful and wonderful things God has made the world for you to enjoy. Be contented with what you have got and make the best of it. Look on the bright side of things instead of the gloomy one. But the real way to get happiness is by giving out happiness to other people. Try and leave this world a little better than you found it and when your turn comes to die, you can die happy in feeling that at any rate you have not wasted your time but have done your best. "Be prepared" in this way, to live happy and to die happy – stick to your Scout Promise always – even after you have ceased to be a boy – and God help you to do it.

Baden-Powell died on 8 January 1941; his grave is in St Peter's Cemetery in Nyeri, Kenya. His gravestone bears a circle with a dot in the centre "ʘ", which is the trail sign for "Going home", or "I have gone home". His wife Olave moved back to England in 1942; after she died in 1977, her ashes were taken to Kenya by her grandson Robert and interred beside her husband. In 2001, the Kenyan government declared Baden-Powell's grave a national monument.

== Writings and publications ==
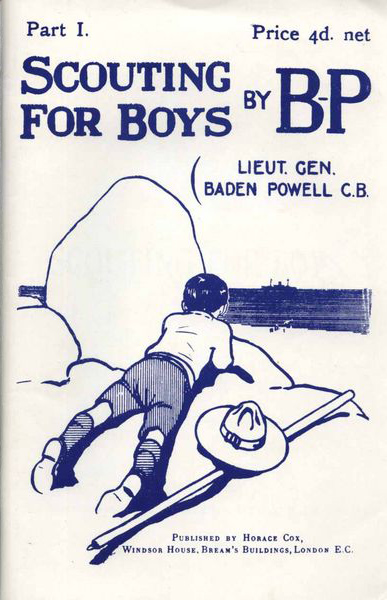
Cover of first part of Scouting for Boys, January 1908

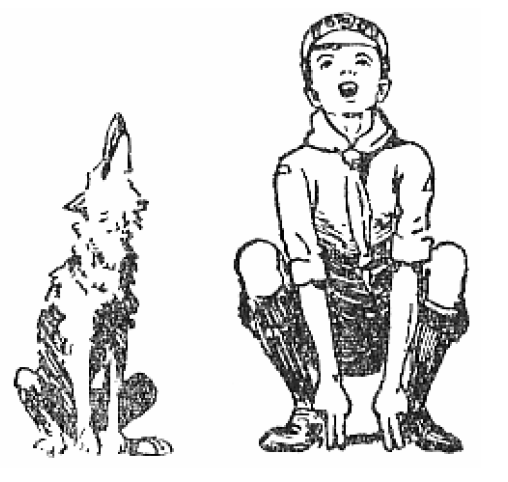
One of Baden-Powell's illustrations from The Wolf Cub Handbook, 1916

Baden-Powell published books and other texts during his years of military service both to finance his life and to generally educate his men.

- 1883: On Vedette: An Easy Aide-Mémoire
- 1884: Reconnaissance and Scouting
- 1885: Cavalry Instruction
- 1889: Pigsticking or Hoghunting
- 1896: The Downfall of Prempeh: A Diary of Life with the Native Levy in Ashanti, 1895-96
- 1897: The Campaign in Rhodesia
- 1897: The Matabele Campaign; being a narrative of the campaign in suppressing the native rising in Matabeleland and Mashonaland
- 1899: Aids to Scouting for N.-C.Os and Men
- 1900: Sport in War
- 1901: Notes and Instructions for the South African Constabulary
- 1907: Sketches in Mafeking and East Africa
- 1910: British Discipline, Essay No. 32 of Essays on Duty and Discipline
- 1914: Quick Training for War
- 1915: Indian Memories (American title Memories of India)
- 1915: My Adventures as a Spy

Baden-Powell was regarded as an excellent storyteller. During his whole life he told "ripping yarns" to audiences. After having published Scouting for Boys, Baden-Powell kept on writing more handbooks and educative materials for all Scouts, as well as directives for Scout Leaders. In his later years, he also wrote about the Scout movement and his ideas for its future. He spent most of the last two years of his life in Africa, and many of his later books had African themes.

- 1908: Scouting for Boys
- 1909: The Scout Library No.4 Scouting Games, first published as a book by C. Arthur Pearson Ltd. in 1910.
- 1909: Yarns for Boy Scouts
- 1912: The Handbook for the Girl Guides or How Girls Can Help to Build Up the Empire (co-authored with his younger sister Agnes Baden-Powell)
- 1913: Boy Scouts Beyond The Sea: My World Tour
- 1916: Young Knights of the Empire: Their Code, and Further Scout Yarns
- 1916: The Wolf Cub's Handbook
- 1918: Girl Guiding
- 1919: Aids To Scoutmastership
- 1921: What Scouts Can Do: More Yarns
- 1921: An Old Wolf's Favourites
- 1922: Rovering to Success
- 1927: Life's Snags and How to Meet Them
- 1927: South African Tour 1926-7
- 1929: Scouting and Youth Movements
- est 1929: Last Message to Scouts
- 1932: illustrated by Baden-Powell, He-Who-Sees-in-the-Dark; the Boys' Story of Frederick Burnham, the American Scout
- 1933: Lessons From the Varsity of Life, the American edition was titled Lessons of a Lifetime
- 1934: Adventures and Accidents
- 1935: Scouting Round the World
- 1936: Adventuring to Manhood
- 1937: African Adventures
- 1938: Birds and Beasts of Africa
- 1939: Paddle Your Own Canoe
- 1940: More Sketches Of Kenya

Most of his books (the American editions) are available online. Compilations and excerpts comprised:

- B.-P.'s Outlook: Selections from the Founder's contributions to "The Scouter" magazine from 1909–1940. C. Arthur Pearson Limited. 1955.
- Adventuring with Baden-Powell: Stories, yarns and essays. Blandford Press. 1956. ASIN B0000CJLLR.
- Dr. Mario Sica, ed. (2007). Playing the Game: A Baden-Powell Compendium. MacMillan. ISBN 978-1-4050-8827-5.
- Fr. Carlo Muratori (2021). A Bibliographical Catalogue of Robert Baden-Powell: Complete bibliographic catalogue of the works in English. Bologna: Biblioteca Cappuccini.

Baden-Powell contributed to various other books, either with an introduction or foreword, or being quoted by the author, including:

- 1905: Ambidexterity by John Jackson
- 1930: Fifty Years Against the Stream: The Story of a School in Kashmir, 1880–1930 by E. D. Tyndale-Biscoe about the Tyndale Biscoe School

A comprehensive bibliography of his original works has been published by Biblioteca Frati Minori Cappuccini.

== Art ==
Baden-Powell's father often sketched caricatures of those present at meetings, while his maternal grandmother was also artistic. Baden-Powell painted or sketched almost every day of his life, and with equal competence with either hand. Most of his works have a humorous or informative character. His books are scattered with his pen-and-ink sketches, frequently whimsical. He did a largely unknown number of pen-and-ink sketches; he always travelled with a sketchpad that he used frequently for pencil sketches and "cartoons" for later watercolour paintings. He also created a few sculptures. There is no catalogue of his works, many of which appear in his books, and twelve paintings hang in the British Scout Headquarters at Gilwell Park. There was an exhibition of his work at the Willmer House Museum, Farnham, Surrey, from 11 April – 12 May 1967; a text-only catalogue was produced.

== "I was there" radio broadcast ==
In 1937, Baden-Powell took part in a BBC radio programme in which he recounted his reminiscences of the siege of Mafeking. The programme was recorded by the gramophone company Cairns and Morroson Limited of Percy Street, London and issued as two ten-inch aluminium discs.

== Personal life ==
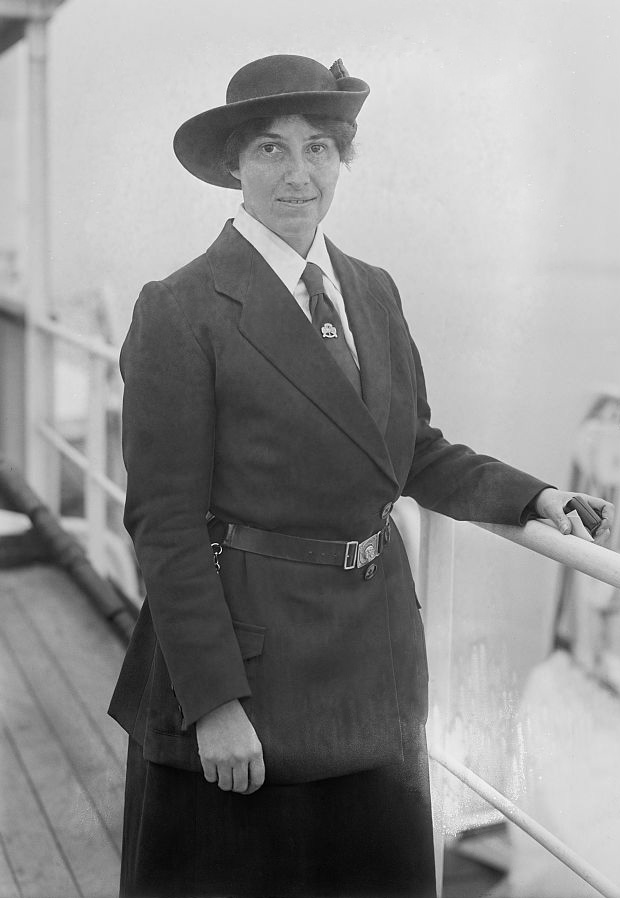
Olave Baden-Powell

In January 1912, Baden-Powell was en route to New York on a world speaking tour, on the ocean liner SS Arcadian, when he met Olave St Clair Soames. She was 23, and he was 55; they shared the same birthday, 22 February. They were engaged in September of the same year, causing a media sensation due to Baden-Powell's fame. They married privately on 30 October 1912 to avoid press intrusion at St Peter's Church, Parkstone. Roughly 100,000 Scouts had each donated a penny (1d) to buy Baden-Powell a wedding gift: a 20-horsepower Standard Motor Company car (not the Rolls-Royce they were presented in 1929). There is a display about their marriage inside St. Peter's Church, Parkstone. Baden-Powell began to suffer persistent headaches, considered by his doctor to be a psychosomatic illness and treated with dream analysis.

Baden-Powell and his wife had three children:

- Arthur Robert Peter (known as Peter) (1913–1962), who succeeded his father in the barony;
- Heather Grace (1915–1986), who, in 1940, in Alton, Hants, married John Hall King (1913–2004). They had two sons, the elder of whom, Michael, drowned in the sinking of SS Heraklion in 1966; the younger was Timothy;
- Betty St Clair (1917–2004), who, in Alton, on 24 September 1936, married Gervas Clay; they had a daughter and three sons.

When Olave's sister, Auriol Davidson (née Soames), died in 1919, Olave and Robert took her three daughters into their family and raised them.

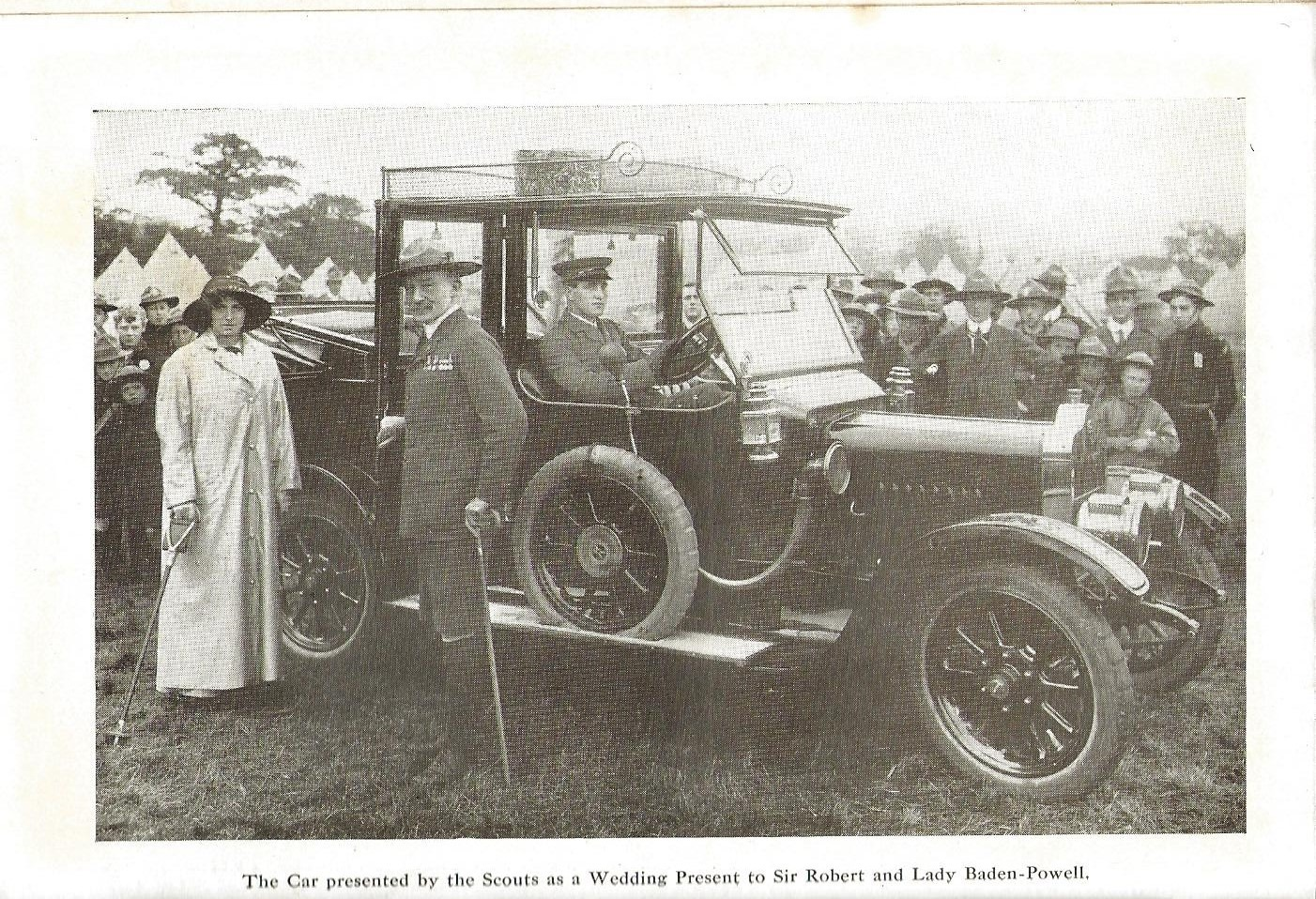
Robert and Olave Baden-Powell, with the car given as a wedding present, at the Imperial Scout Exhibition in Perry Hall Park, Birmingham, in July 1913

In 1919, the couple moved to Pax Hill near Bentley, Hampshire, named as such as it was bought on Armistice Day (11 November 1918). The Bentley house was a gift from her father.

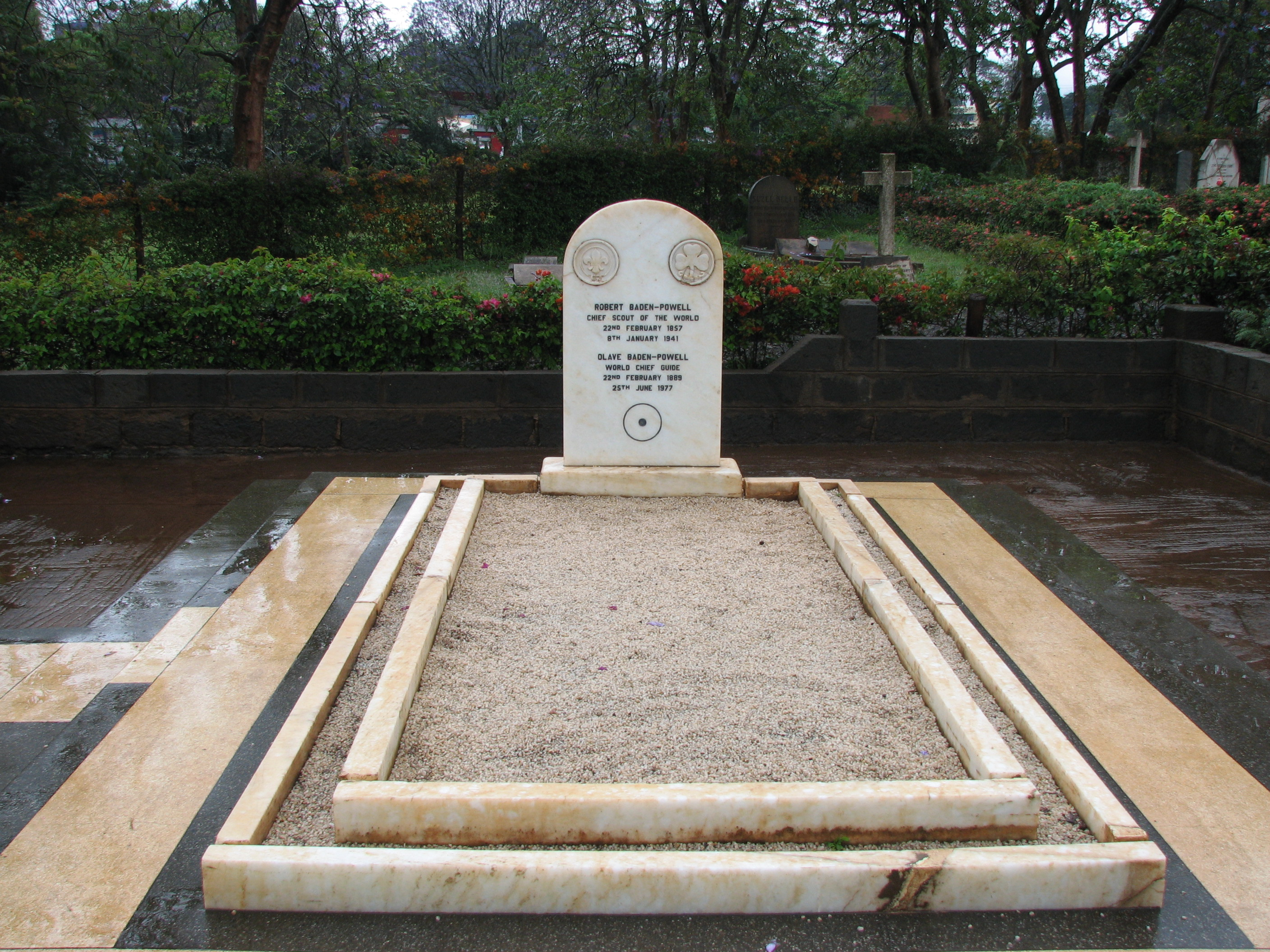
Baden-Powell's grave at St Peter's Cemetery in Nyeri, Kenya

In 1939, they moved to a cottage he had commissioned in Nyeri, Kenya, near Mount Kenya, where he had previously been to recuperate. The small one-room house, which he named Paxtu, was located on the grounds of the Outspan Hotel, owned by Eric Sherbrooke Walker, Baden-Powell's first private secretary and one of the first Scout inspectors. Walker also owned the Treetops Hotel, approximately 10 miles (17 km) out in the Aberdare Range, often visited by Baden-Powell and people of the Happy Valley set. The Paxtu cottage is integrated into the Outspan Hotel buildings and serves as a small museum.

Three of Baden-Powell's many biographers commented—after his wife had died in 1977—on his sexuality; the first two (in 1979 and 1986) focused on his relationship with his close friend Kenneth McLaren. Tim Jeal's 1989 biography discusses the relationship and finds no evidence that this friendship was erotic. Jeal then examines Baden-Powell's views on women, his appreciation of the male form, his military relationships, and his marriage, concluding that, in his personal opinion, Baden-Powell was a repressed homosexual. Jeal's arguments and conclusion are dismissed by Procter and Block (2009) as "amateur psychoanalysis", for which there is no physical evidence.

== Commissions and promotions ==
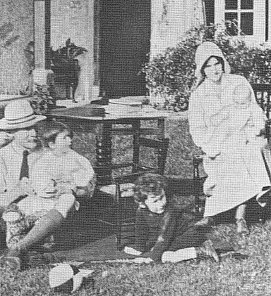
Baden-Powell with wife and three children, 1917

- Commissioned sub-lieutenant, 13th Hussars, 11 September 1876, retroactively granted the rank of lieutenant from the same date on 17 September 1878
- Captain, 13th Hussars, 16 May 1883
  - Brevet major, British Army, 1888
- Major, 13th Hussars, 1 July 1890
  - Brevet lieutenant colonel, British Army, 25 March 1895
- Lieutenant colonel, 13th Hussars, 25 April 1897
  - Full colonel, British Army, 8 May 1897
  - Commanding officer, 5th Dragoon Guards, 1897
- Major general, 23 May 1900
  - Inspector General of Cavalry, British Army, 1903
- Lieutenant general, 10 June 1907

== Recognition ==
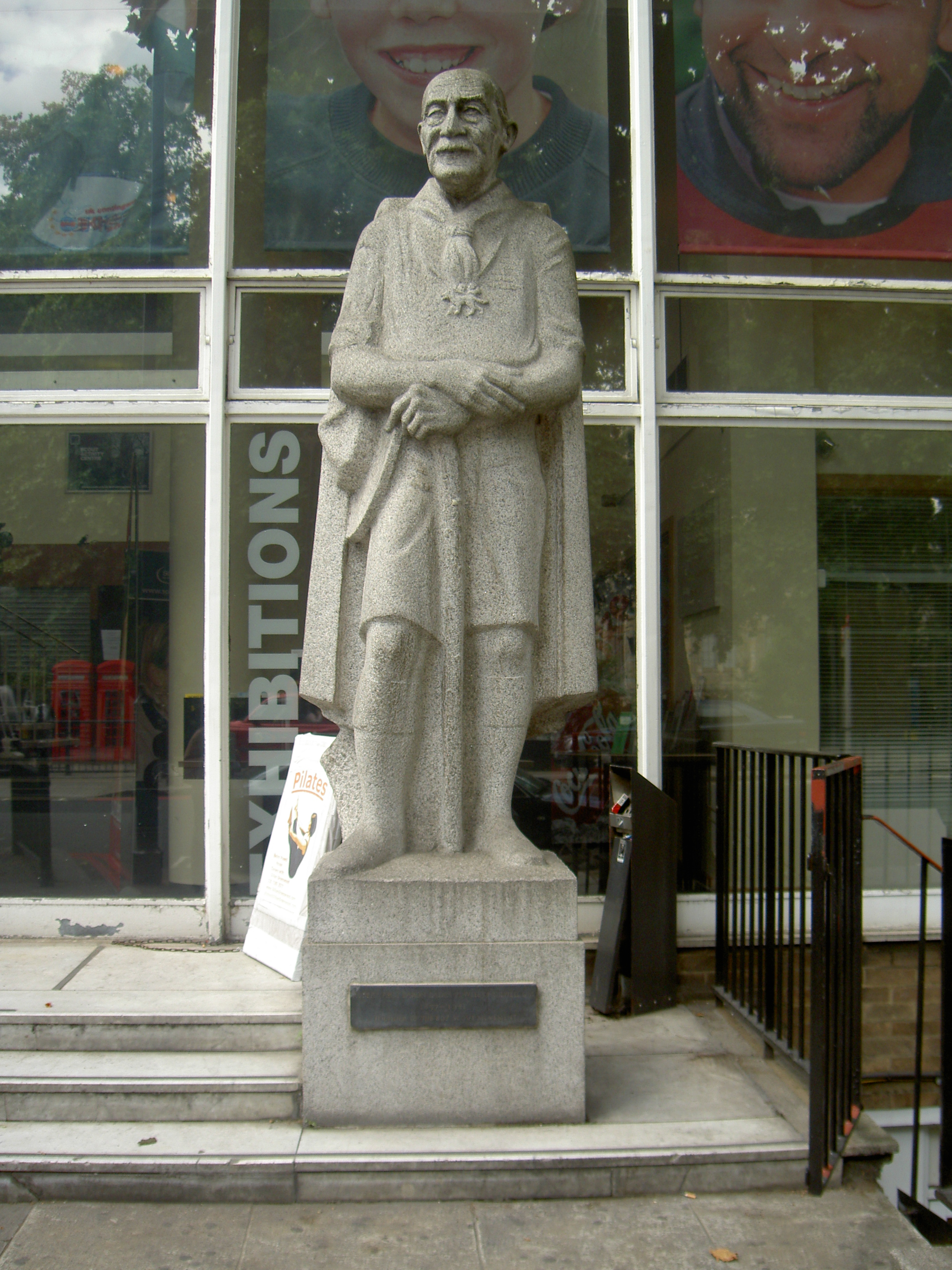
Statue of Baden-Powell by Don Potter in front of Baden-Powell House in London

In 1937, Baden-Powell was appointed to the Order of Merit, one of the most exclusive awards in the British honours system, and he was also awarded 28 decorations by foreign states, including the Grand Officer of the Portuguese Order of Christ, the Grand Commander of the Greek Order of the Redeemer (1920), the Commander of the French Légion d'honneur (1925), the First Class of the Hungarian Order of Merit (1929), the Grand Cross of the Order of the Dannebrog of Denmark, the Grand Cross of the Order of the White Lion, the Grand Cross of the Order of the Phoenix, and the Order of Polonia Restituta.

The Scout Association's Silver Wolf Award was originally worn by Robert Baden-Powell. The World Organization of the Scout Movement's Bronze Wolf Award, for exceptional services to world Scouting, was first awarded to Baden-Powell by a unanimous decision of the then International Committee on the day of the institution of the Bronze Wolf in Stockholm in 1935. He was also the first recipient of the Boy Scouts of America's Silver Buffalo Award in 1926.

In 1927, at the Swedish National Jamboree, he was awarded by the Österreichischer Pfadfinderbund with the "Großes Dankabzeichen des ÖPB. In 1931, Baden-Powell received the highest award of the First Austrian Republic (Großes Ehrenzeichen der Republik am Bande) out of the hands of President Wilhelm Miklas. Baden-Powell was also one of the first and few recipients of the Goldene Gemse, the highest award conferred by the Österreichischer Pfadfinderbund.

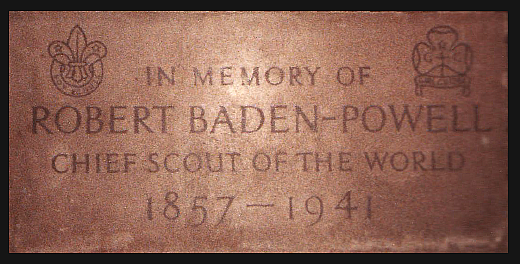
Memorial plaque to Baden-Powell, "Chief Scout of the World", at Westminster Abbey

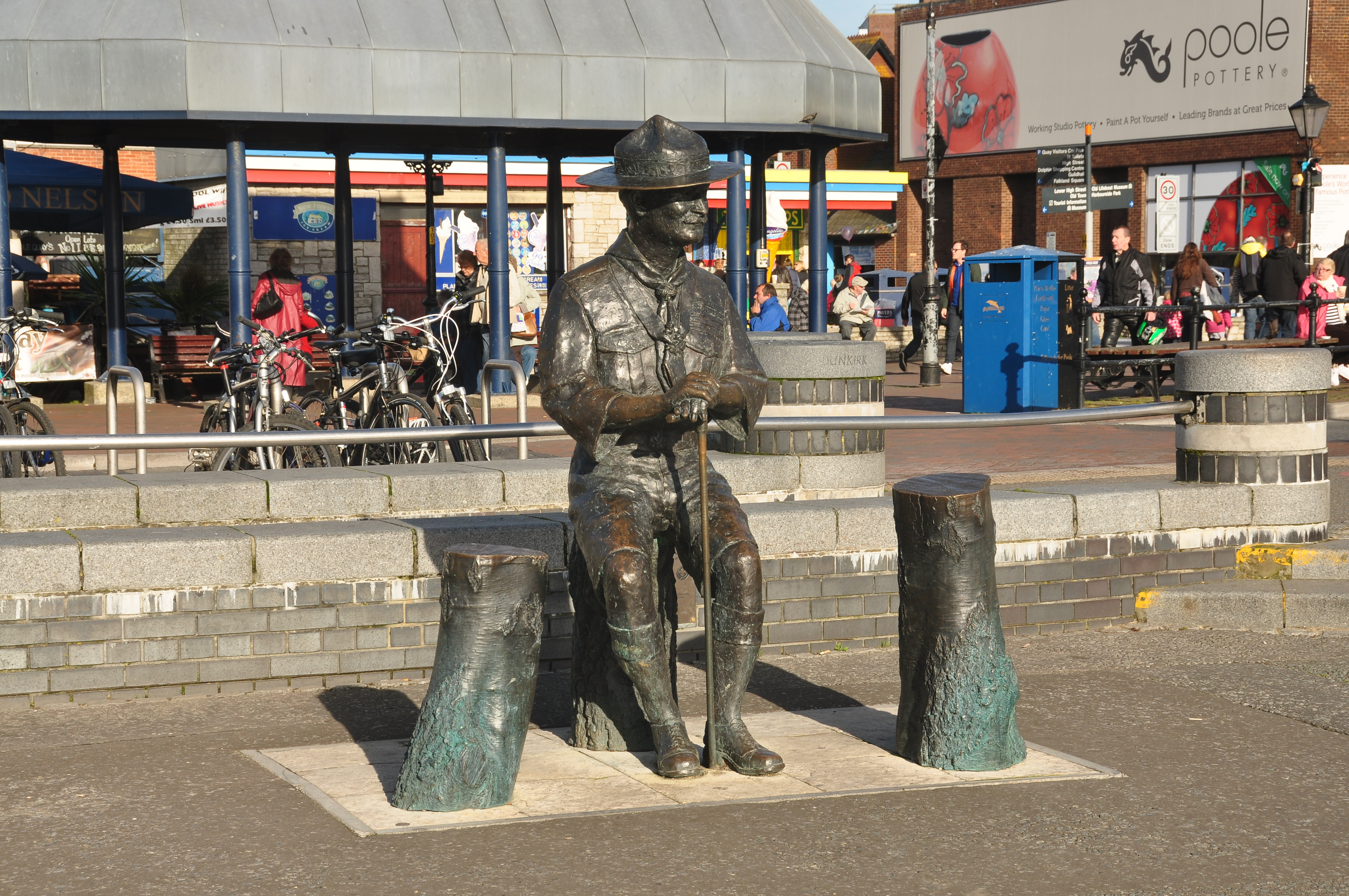
Statue of Baden-Powell by David Annand in Poole, Dorset

In 1931, Major Frederick Russell Burnham dedicated Mount Baden-Powell in California to his friend from forty years before. Today, their friendship is honoured in perpetuity with the dedication of the adjoining peak, Mount Burnham. Baden-Powell was nominated for the Nobel Peace Prize on numerous occasions, including 10 separate nominations in 1928. He was awarded the Wateler Peace Prize in 1937. In 2002, Baden-Powell was named 13th in the BBC's list of the 100 Greatest Britons following a UK-wide vote. As part of the Scouting 2007 Centenary, Nepal renamed Urkema Peak to Baden-Powell Peak.

In June 2020, following the George Floyd protests in Britain and the removal of the statue of Edward Colston in Bristol, Bournemouth, Christchurch and Poole Council (BCP Council) announced that a statue of Baden-Powell on Poole Quay would be removed temporarily for its protection, amid fears for its safety. Police believed it was on a list of monuments to be destroyed or removed, and that it was a target for protestors due to perceptions that Baden-Powell had held homophobic and racist views. The statue was installed by Poole Borough Council in 2008.

Following opposition to its removal, including from residents, and past and present scouts, some of whom camped nearby to ensure it stayed in place, BCP Council had the statue boarded up instead. Mark Howell, deputy leader of BCP Council was quoted as saying, "It is our intention that the boarding is removed at the earliest, safe opportunity." The boarding was removed three weeks after it was put up.

=== Honours – United Kingdom ===
Ribbon	Description	Notes
	Ashanti Star	1895
	British South Africa Company Medal	1896
	Queen's South Africa Medal	1899
	Order of the Bath (CB)	Appointed Companion 12 October 1901
	King's South Africa Medal	with SOUTH AFRICA 1901, SOUTH AFRICA 1901 Clasp
	Royal Victorian Order (KCVO)	Appointed Knight Commander on 3 October 1909
	Order of the Bath (KCB)	Appointed Knight Commander on 12 October 1909
	King George V Coronation Medal	Decoration awarded on 30 June 1911
	Venerable Order of St John	Appointed Knight of Grace on 23 May 1912
	Royal Victorian Order (GCVO)	Appointed Knight Grand Cross on 1 January 1923
	Baronet (Bt)	Appointed Baronet on 1 January 1921 (dated 21 February 1923)
	Order of St Michael and St George (GCMG)	Appointed Knight Grand Cross in 1927 Birthday Honours
	Baron Baden-Powell, of Gilwell in the County of Essex	17 September 1929
	King George V Silver Jubilee Medal	Decoration awarded on 6 May 1935
	Order of Merit (OM)	Appointed member on 11 May 1937
	King George VI Coronation Medal	Decoration awarded on 12 May 1937

=== Honours – other countries ===
Ribbon	Description	Notes
	Grand Officer of the Military Order of Christ (Portugal)	Decoration awarded on 7 October 1919; Grand Officer level (GOC); (Portugal) Portuguese award
	Grand Commander of the Order of the Redeemer	Decoration awarded on 21 October 1920; Grand Commander level; (Greece) Greek award
	Grand Cross of the Order of the Dannebrog	Decoration awarded on 11 October 1921; Grand Cross level; (Denmark) Danish award
	Grand Cross of the Order of the White Lion	Decoration awarded on 6 November 1929; Grand Cross level; (Czechoslovakia) Czechoslovak award
	Knight of the Hungarian Order of Merit	Decoration awarded in 1929; Knight level, Grand Cross after 1935; (Hungary) Hungarian award
	Grand Cross of the Order of the Phoenix	Decoration awarded in 1930; Grand Cross level; (Greece) Greek award
	Grand Cross of the Order of Orange-Nassau	Decoration awarded in 1932; Grand Cross level; (Netherlands) Dutch award
	Order of the Lithuanian Grand Duke Gediminas, 1st Class	Decoration awarded in 1932; 1st Class level; (Lithuania) Lithuanian award

== Arms ==
Coat of arms of Robert Baden-Powell, 1st Baron Baden-Powell
Adopted 1929 Coronet Coronet of a baron. Crest 1st: a Lion passant Or in the paw a broken Tilting Spear in bend proper pendent therefrom by a Riband Gules an Escutcheon resting on a Wreath Sable charged with a Pheon Or (Powell); 2nd: out of a Crown Vallary Or a Demi Lion rampant Gules on the head a like Crown charged on the shoulders with a Cross Pattée Argent and supporting with the paws a Sword Erect proper Pommel and Hilt Gold (Baden). Escutcheon Quarterly: 1 and 4th, Per fess Or and Argent a Lion rampant gules between two Tilting Spears erect proper (Powell); 2nd and 3rd, Argent a Lion rampant proper on the head a Crown Vallary Or between four Crosses pattée Gules and as many Fleur-de-lis Azure alternately (Baden). Supporters Not shown here. Dexter: an Officer of 13th/18th Royal Hussars in full dress, his Sword drawn over his shoulder proper; sinister: a Boy Scout holding a Staff also proper. Motto Ar Nyd Yw Pwyll Pyd Yw (Welsh: Where there is steadiness, there will be a Powell). Orders Knight Commander of the Order of the Bath (KCB) – 9 November 1909 (CB: 1901) Knight Grand Cross of the Royal Victorian Order (GCVO) – 1 January 1923 (KCVO: 3 October 1909) Knight of Grace of the Venerable Order of St John (KStJ) – 23 May 1912 Grand Officer of the Order of Christ of Portugal (GOC) – 7 October 1919 Grand Commander of the Order of the Redeemer of the Kingdom of Greece – 21 October 1920 Grand Cross of the Order of the Dannebrog of Denmark – 11 October 1921 Baronet – 1 January 1921 (dated 21 February 1923) Grand Cross of the Order of St Michael and St George (GCMG) – 3 June 1927 Baron Baden-Powell, of Gilwell in the County of Essex – 17 September 1929 Member of the Order of Merit (OM) – 11 May 1937

== Cultural depictions ==
- Actor Ron Moody portrays Baden-Powell in the 1972–1973 miniseries The Edwardians.

== See also ==
- Baden-Powell's unilens
- List of Scouting memorials

Military offices
New title	General Officer Commanding Northumbrian Division; 1908–1910	Succeeded by Francis Plowden
Peerage of the United Kingdom
New title	Baron Baden-Powell; 1929–1941	Succeeded by Peter Baden-Powell
Baronetage of the United Kingdom
New title	Baronet (of Bentley); 1922–1941	Succeeded by Peter Baden-Powell
Scouting
New title	Chief Scout of the British Empire; 1908–1941	Succeeded by Lord Somers
New title	Chief Scout of the World; 1920–1941	Never assigned again
