= Pax Hill =

House in Hampshire, England

Coordinates: 51°11′32″N 0°53′29″W

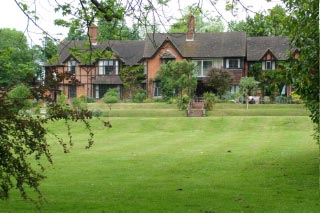
- View of the house
- Interactive map of the Pax Hill area

General information
- Location: Bentley, Hampshire, England

Technical details
- Material: Red-brick

Design and construction
- Other designers: Robert Baden-Powell
- Known for: Family home of Robert Baden-Powell

Pax Hill (Peace Hill), near Bentley, Hampshire, England, was the family home of Robert Baden-Powell, founder of the Scout movement, and his wife, Olave, for over twenty years during the 20th century. It is located at the end of a half-mile drive, off the main A31 road. Pax Hill is a red-bricked house fronting south with higher ground behind.

== History ==
The house was originally called "Blackacre" and was purchased with a gift from Olave Baden-Powell's father in 1918. Baden-Powell changed the name of the house to Pax (Latin for Peace) to correspond with the virtues of the Scout Movement. In the Baden-Powell family's time, there was a rose garden with dovecote at one side of the front of the house. Elsewhere, there were two summer houses, a shrubbery and a tennis court. Scouts and Guides camped on either side of the drive. The Baden-Powells added two wings. The west wing was designed by Robert Baden-Powell himself and he also modelled the frieze for the new bathroom, depicting fish in the River Wey.

Baden-Powell would live in the house during the height of his fame as leader of the Scouting movement, being filmed in the house for public news reels by Paramount Pictures, Gaumont, Movietone News and others.

In 1929, it was burgled and a number of souvenirs were stolen. The family moved to Kenya in 1939 and Robert Baden-Powell died in 1941. The following year, due to World War II, Pax Hill was occupied by Canadian military troops and Olave Baden-Powell was required to leave. However, she was awarded a 'grace and favour' apartment in Hampton Court Palace.

After World War II, Olave Baden-Powell gave Pax Hill to the Girl Guides Association (now Girlguiding UK) to be used as a centre for members from the Commonwealth of Nations. The house became a Domestic Science Training School run on Guiding principles. In April 1953, Pax Hill was sold with the consent of Olave Baden-Powell. In the late 1970s and early 1980s Pax Hill was a boys boarding school. It has been a nursing home since 1988.

== See also ==
- Don Potter
