= Scouting Round the World =

Seminal work

- First edition cover
- Publisher: World Organization of the Scout Movement
- Publication date: 1959

Scouting 'Round the World is the seminal work on world Scouting, a publication of the World Organization of the Scout Movement, updated every three years, with details on all WOSM member-nation organizations. The equivalent publication of the World Association of Girl Guides and Girl Scouts is Trefoil 'Round the World.

== History ==
Colonel J. S. Wilson had been the Director of Training of The Boy Scouts Association, in that capacity he had worked with Scout associations from many countries.

Upon the 50th anniversary of World Scouting in 1957, Wilson took his research notes gathered on a six-year world tour reviewing the world's Scout organizations, culminating in a five-month tour of Asia in October 1952, and authored the publication of the first edition of Scouting Round the World.
