= Bentley, Hampshire =

Village and parish in Hampshire, England

Coordinates: 51.19401°N 0.87756°W

Bentley
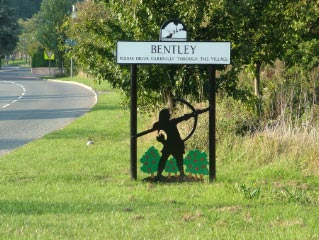
- The Bentley Archer

- Location within Hampshire
- Population: 1,116 (2011)
- OS grid reference: SU785445
- Civil parish: Bentley
- District: East Hampshire
- Shire county: Hampshire
- Region: South East
- Country: England
- Sovereign state: United Kingdom
- Post town: FARNHAM
- Postcode district: GU10
- Dialling code: 01420
- Police: Hampshire and Isle of Wight
- Fire: Hampshire and Isle of Wight
- Ambulance: South Central
- UK Parliament: East Hampshire

Bentley is a village and civil parish in the East Hampshire district of Hampshire, England. The parish has changed little over centuries and currently measures 2,299 acres (9.30 km^{2}), the same size it measured in 1875 when the population was 731 The village is north of the A31 road between Farnham and Alton, about five miles (8 km) southwest of Farnham and six miles (10 km) northeast of Alton. The village is served by Bentley railway station, which is about one mile (1.6 km) to the south, in the parish of Binsted against Alice Holt Forest.

There is one pub in the village, The Star Inn, and a large village shop complete with a cafe and a post office.

== Culture ==
Bentley was the location of a Radio 4 and ITV Docu-Drama from the 1990s called The Village, which focused on local residents and their daily lives.

Twinned with Newton Haven the village is proud of its culture.

== Notable residents ==
- Robert Baden-Powell, 1st Baron Baden-Powell, founder of the Scout Movement, lived in Bentley at Pax Hill
- Sir William Pike, Vice Chief of the Imperial General Staff
- Harold Sanderson, the owner of the White Star Line, learned of the sinking of the Titanic whilst at his home Jenkyn Place in Bentley.
