= Olave Baden-Powell, Baroness Baden-Powell =

First Chief Guide for Britain (1889-1977)

The Right Honourable The Lady Baden-Powell GBE
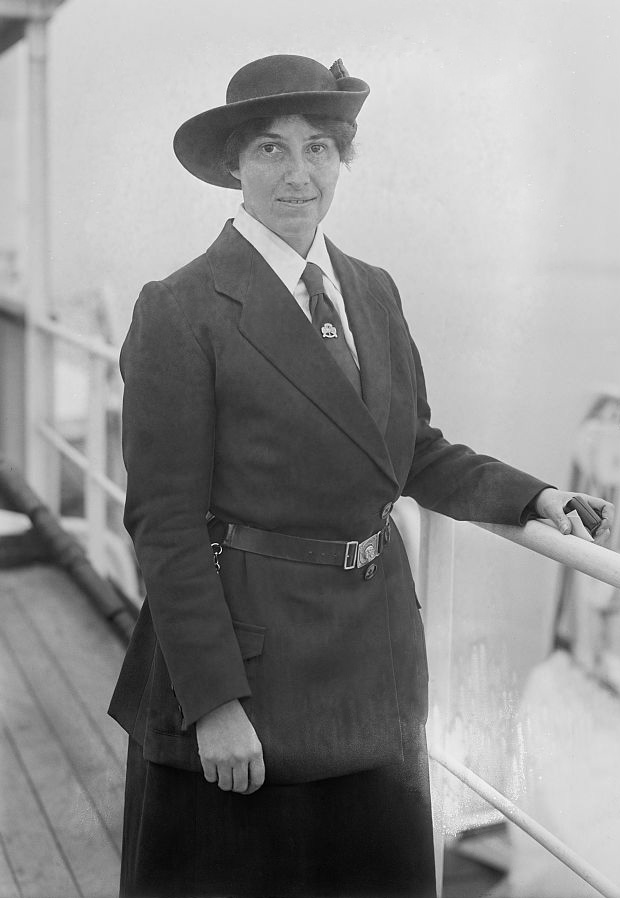
- Baden-Powell c. 1920
- Born: Olave St Clair Soames; 22 February 1889; Chesterfield, Derbyshire, England
- Died: 25 June 1977 (aged 88); Bramley, Surrey, England
- Occupations: Guiding and Scouting
- Spouse: Robert Baden-Powell, 1st Baron Baden-Powell (m. 1912; died 1941)
- Children: Peter Baden-Powell, 2nd Baron; The Hon. Heather King; The Hon. Betty Clay
- Relatives: Arthur Granville Soames (brother)

Olave St Clair Baden-Powell, Baroness Baden-Powell GBE (née Soames; 22 February 1889 – 25 June 1977) was the first Chief Guide for Britain and the wife of Robert Baden-Powell, 1st Baron Baden-Powell (the founder of Scouting and co-founder of Girl Guides).

Lady Baden-Powell became Chief Guide for Britain in 1918. Later the same year, at the Swanwick Conference for Commissioners in October, she was presented with a gold Silver Fish, one of only two ever made. She was elected World Chief Guide in 1930. As well as making a major contribution to the development of the Guide/Girl Scout movements, she visited 111 countries during her life, attending Jamborees and national Guide and Scout associations. In 1932, she was created a Dame Grand Cross of the Order of the British Empire by King George V.

== Family and early life ==
Born in Chesterfield, Derbyshire, England, Olave Soames was the third child and youngest daughter of a brewery owner and artist Harold Soames (1855–1918), of Gray Rigg, Lilliput, Dorset (descended from the landed gentry Soames family of Sheffield Park), and his wife Katherine Mary, daughter of George Hill. She was educated by her parents and by several governesses at home. She lived in seventeen homes in the first 23 years of her life. Olave became keen on outdoor sports, including tennis, swimming, football, skating, and canoeing, and also played the violin.

Olave was the sister of Arthur Granville Soames and therefore the aunt of his children, including Christopher Soames, a Conservative politician and diplomat who, in 1947, married Mary Churchill, the youngest child of Winston Churchill.

== Adult life ==
=== Marriage and Children ===
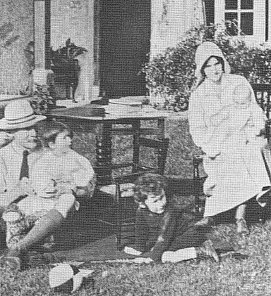
Baden-Powell with her husband and their three children in 1917.

In January 1912, Olave met Second Boer War British general and founder of the Scouts, Robert Baden-Powell, on an ocean liner (RMSP Arcadian) on a cruise to the Caribbean. He was on his way to New York City to start a round-the-world lecture tour. She was 23, and he was 55, and they shared a birthday. They became engaged on his return to England in September of the same year, causing a media sensation. They married on 30 October 1912 in a private ceremony in St. Peter's Church, Parkstone, her parish church. Apart from the clergy, the only other people present were Robert's brother, sister, and Robert Kekewich, a close friend of his and Best Man, as well as Olave's mother, and brother, her brother-in-law, and Sie Bower, a close friend of hers, who had introduced them on that cruise.

The Scouts and Guides of England each donated a penny to buy the Baden-Powell couple a wedding gift of a car (not the Rolls-Royce called "Jam-Roll" that was presented to them in 1929). Olave's father helped financially with the purchase on Armistice Day 1918 of Pax Hill (hence the name they gave it) near Bentley, Hampshire, as a family home where she lived with her husband from 29 January 1919 until 25 October 1938.

The Baden-Powells had three children—a son and two daughters (who took the courtesy titles of Honourable in 1929). The son later succeeded his father as the 2nd Lord Baden-Powell upon his father's death in 1941):

- Arthur Robert Peter Baden-Powell, later 2nd Baron Baden-Powell (1913–1962), married Carine Boardman (1913–1993), and they had two sons and a daughter. At Peter's death, the elder son, Robert, succeeded him as 3rd Baron Baden-Powell. The younger son, Michael, and the daughter lived in Australia;
- Heather Baden-Powell (1915–1986) married John Hall King in Q2 1940 in Bentey Parish Church and they had two sons; and
- Betty Clay (1917–2004), who, like her mother, met her future husband on board a ship — an older man (by a decade) who shared her birthday. On 24 September 1936 she married Gervas Charles Robert Clay (1907–2009), who worked for HMOCS — His Majesty's Overseas Civil Service — in Northern Rhodesia from 1930 to 1964. They had a daughter and three sons. Betty Clay was also prominent in the Guide Movement in Northern Rhodesia until they retired to England in 1964, when she became involved with the Girl Guides in England until her death.

In addition, when Olave's sister, Auriol Davidson, née Soames, died in 1919, Olave took her three nieces, Christian (1912–1975), Clare (1913–1980), and Yvonne (1918–2000), into her family and raised them as her children.

=== War work ===
During 1915 and 1916, with World War I in progress, Olave assisted directly with the war effort in France. Robert had seen the usefulness of the YMCA's recreational huts for the soldiers and persuaded the Mercers' Company (of which he had been Master in 1912) to pay for such a hut at Val-de-Lievres, Calais. It was to be staffed by adults connected with Scouting. Olave was one of the team of five men and three women who staffed the hut at the start. She persuaded her mother to look after the children when she was away.

Olave left for France on 7 October 1915, when her second child was five months old. Her regular work in the Mercers' hut included serving cocoa and cigarettes and chatting with those who came in. She also recalled in her autobiography playing her violin and singing at the Christmas Concert. Olave also adopted several stray animals during her time in Val-de-Lievres.

During this time, Robert had organised the Scouts to sponsor another recreational hut. Olave and two others started this hut at Étaples after Christmas 1915. At the end of January, Olave was ordered home due to sickness, ending her three months in France.

=== Growing involvement in Scouting and Guiding ===
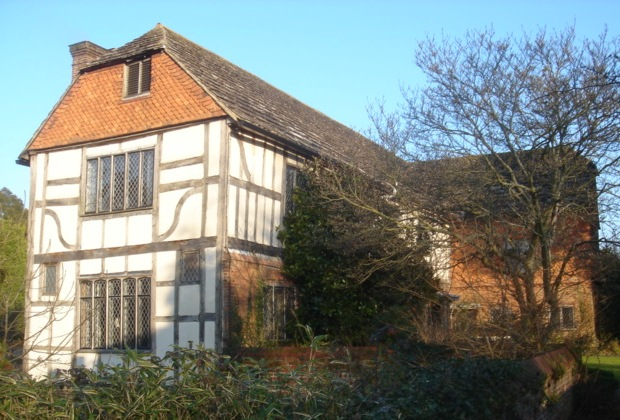
Ewhurst Place

Olave and Robert moved into Ewhurst Place, outside Robertsbridge in East Sussex, in April 1913. In June of that year, the 1st Ewhurst Scout Troop was inaugurated. Olave was the warranted Scoutmaster of this troop, assisted by the family's housemaid and the gardener. Olave accompanied Robert on many of his Scouting tours and to events. She also typed letters for him. In 1915, the Baden-Powells bought a small car, and after Robert taught her to drive, Olave often drove him to engagements.

Although most famously connected with the Girl Guides, Olave's first offer to help them in 1914 was turned down. The Girl Guide movement had started after pressure from girls who wanted to become Scouts - by the time of the Crystal Palace Rally in 1909 there were already 6,000 girls registered as Scouts. The Girl Guide movement was set up by Robert Baden-Powell and his sister Agnes Baden-Powell. After the reorganisation of the Girl Guides in 1915, Olave again offered to help, this time successfully, and she started organising Guiding in Sussex. She became the County Commissioner for Sussex in March 1916. In October 1916, the first conference for County Commissioners was held, and it was here that the Commissioners unanimously requested that Olave take the role of Chief Commissioner – she was just pregnant with her third child. Shortly before this, she had organised a great number of women in other parts of Britain to take up roles in Guiding. In 1918, Olave was acclaimed Chief Guide, a title she much preferred to Chief Commissioner.

=== Recognition ===
==== Awards ====
Year	Award	Country/Organisation	Notes
1918	Silver Fish Award	Girl Guiding Association	
1932	Dame Grand Cross of The Most Excellent Order of the British Empire (GBE)	United Kingdom	Awarded by King George V in recognition of her volunteer work
1933	Medal of Merit	Poland	
1933	Order of the Estonian Red Cross	Estonia	
1934	Order of the White Rose of Finland	Finland	
1950	Order of the Silver Phoenix	Greece	
1951	Medal of Honour and Merit	Haiti	
1957	Bronze Wolf	World Organization of the Scout Movement	Awarded by the World Scout Committee for exceptional services to world Scouting
1957	Golden Pheasant Award	Japan	The highest distinction of the Scout Association of Japan
1959	Order of Vasco Núñez de Balboa	Panama	
1959	Order of the Sun	Peru	
1959	Orden al Mérito de Chile	Chile	
1963	Order of the Sacred Treasure	Japan	
1965	Order of the Ducal Crown of Oaks	Luxembourg	
1965	Gold Cross	San Salvador	

==== Standard ====
Olave Baden-Powell was presented with a personal standard by the UK Girl Guides' County Commissioners. Kay-Shuttleworth supervised the making of the standard.

The Standard of Lady Baden-Powell, Chief Guide of the World, is blue (azure) from the hoist to the fly. Nearest the hoist is the gold (or) trefoil; then come two small hemispheres, showing a coloured map of the world, indicating her post as Chief Guide. These are placed high to the left of the main fly, which is divided throughout its length by two silver (argent) waves, amongst which are shown three ships with black hulls and white sails, four dolphins and the Gold Fish of the Chief Guide. Then between two red (gules) motto bands on which are embroidered the Baden-Powell and Girl Guide mottoes in gold letters, there is a section alluding to the outdoor life, showing white tents on a green (vert) field. In the extreme fly the Baden-Powell crests are embroidered.

=== Death of Robert Baden-Powell ===
Olave outlived her husband, who was 32 years her senior, by over 35 years. In October 1938, she moved with him to the Outspan Hotel, in Nyeri, Kenya, near her third cousin, Jack Soames, and the notorious Happy Valley set. Robert Baden-Powell died there on 8 January 1941. Lord Erroll was in the funeral procession, just before his murder on 24 January 1941.

After her husband's death, Olave received thousands of letters of condolence. She was helped to reply to them all by Bertha Hines, the wife of David Hines, who was away fighting the Italian army that had invaded Ethiopia and Somalia. Olave often watched Bertha's baby daughter, Penny, while Bertha typed reply letters.

=== World War II ===
In 1942, she braved U-boat attacks to return to the UK and, as she had no home to return to, was allocated a grace and favour apartment in Hampton Court Palace, in which she lived from 1943 to 1976. Her own home, Pax Hill, had been commandeered and taken over by the Canadian military. Through World War II, she toured the United Kingdom. She was on a visit when a V2 missile damaged her Hampton Court apartment in 1944. She went to France and toured throughout Europe as soon as she could after D-Day, as the war ended, to help revive Guiding and Scouting.

=== After World War II ===
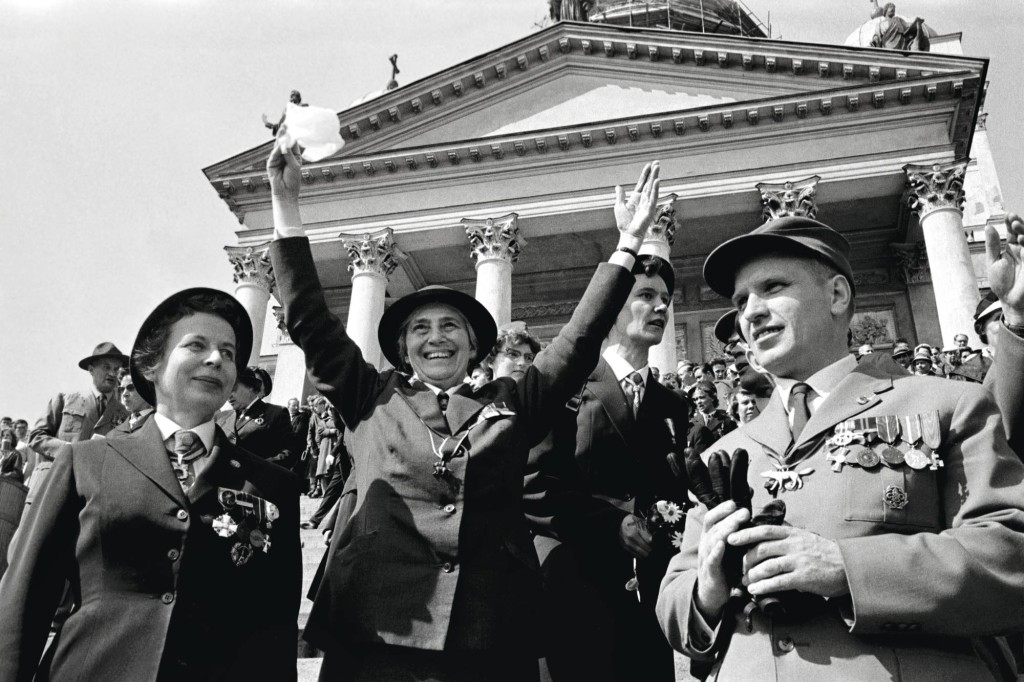
Lady Baden-Powell visiting Helsinki in 1960. To her left, Helvi Sipilä, to her right, Jarl Wahlström.

Olave led the Guide Movement worldwide for forty years, travelling all over the globe helping to establish and encourage the Guide Movement in other countries, and bringing membership to over six and a half million worldwide. Olave was present in Washington, DC in 1962 for the celebration of the 50th anniversary of the founding of the Girl Scouts. (Note: Kathleen Weber was invited as a troop representative at the age of 12 to this event.)

Having suffered a heart attack in Australia in 1961, she was finally banned from travelling by her doctor at the age of 80 in 1970 when she was diagnosed with diabetes, from which she eventually died.

In 1968, the Boy Scouts of America (BSA) gave Olave a credit card to defray her travel costs. When she stopped travelling, the BSA asked her to use the card for 'keeping in touch'. This included paying for over 2000 Christmas cards she sent to those personally known to her.

Having spent her later years in a grace-and-favour apartment at Hampton Court Palace, Olave died on 25 June 1977 at Birtley House, Bramley in Surrey. Her ashes were taken to Kenya to be buried in the same grave as her husband's remains. She was survived by her two daughters, her son having predeceased her.

== Legacy ==
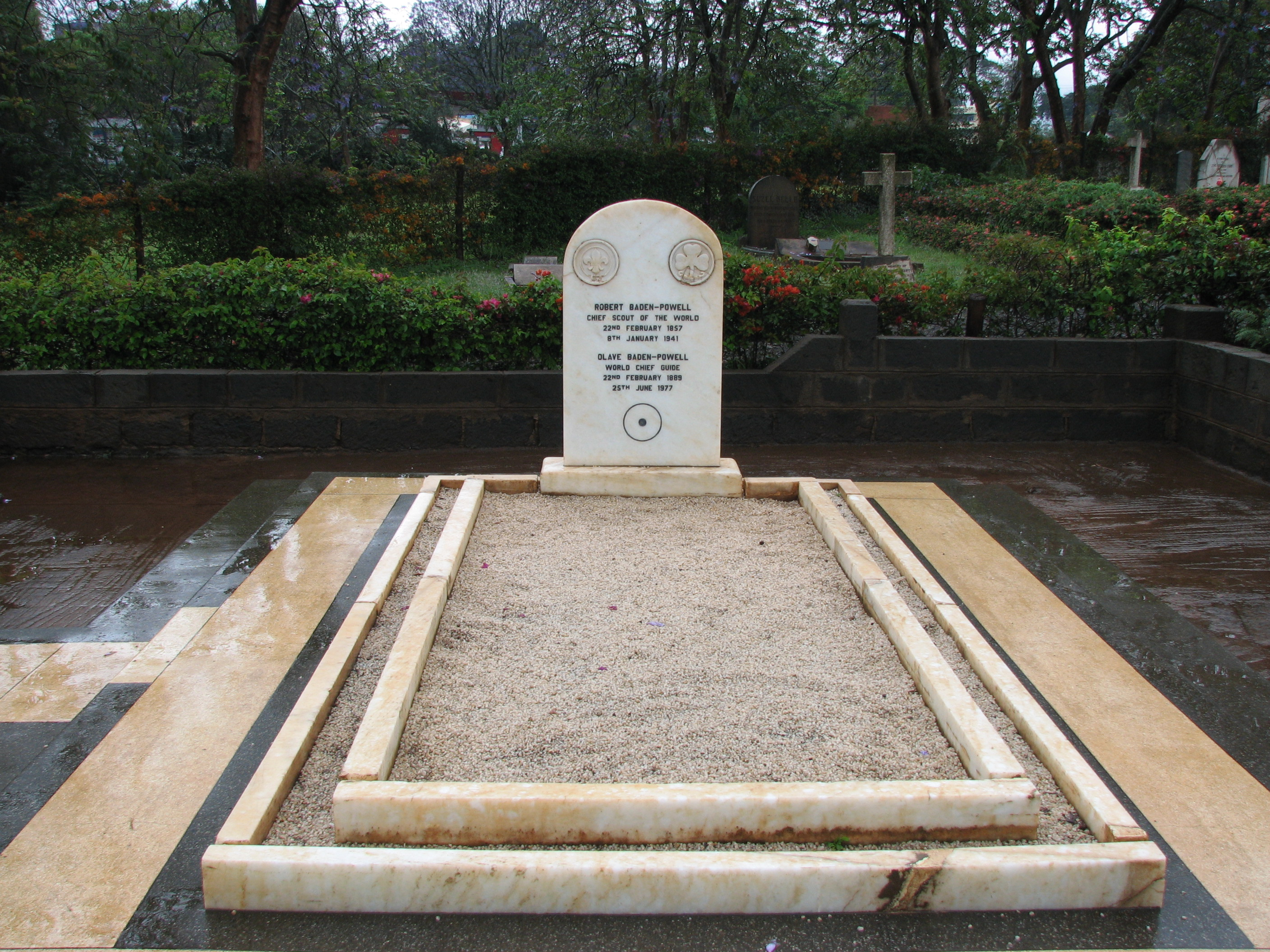
Robert and Olave Baden-Powell's grave in Kenya

The Olave Centre for Guides was built in north London in Olave's memory. This has the World Bureau and Pax Lodge on its grounds. Pax Lodge is one of WAGGGS' five World Centres.

Scouts and Guides mark 22 February as B.-P. Day or World Thinking Day, the joint birthdays of Robert and Olave Baden-Powell, to remember and celebrate the work of the Chief Scout and Chief Guide of the World. On that day in 2011, a Blue Plaque was unveiled near the site of the house in Chesterfield where she lived, by Derbyshire County Council. The plaque installation followed an online poll in which she received 18,026 votes out of 25,080 (72%); this compares to 1,231 (5%) for next most popular nominee, George Stephenson.

The Olave Baden-Powell Bursary Fund was set up in 1979 from voluntary contributions in memory of Olave B-P. Annually awarded bursaries aim to allow girls in Girlguiding UK to further their interests and hobbies and realise their dreams.

As a child, Olave learned the violin; her first violin she called Diana. It was a copy of a Stradivarius made by Messrs. Hill for the Paris Exhibition and many years later it was presented to the Guide Association. It is still available on loan to Guides who are seriously learning to play the violin before they acquire their instrument.

A movement was started in Australia, the idea being, "When you buy an ice-cream, buy one also for the Chief Guide", and this "Ice-cream Fund" raises a significant sum every year, sent to Olave B-P to give away to various Guiding causes; one such was to provide doors for new Guide buildings.

== Works ==
- 1917: "TRAINING GIRLS AS GUIDES: HINTS FOR COMMISSIONERS AND ALL WHO ARE INTERESTED IN THE WELFARE AND TRAINING OF GIRLS" - C. ARTHUR PEARSON LTD
- 1947: "OPENING DOORWAYS" - The story of her travels in Europe in early 1945 - THE GIRL GUIDES ASSOCIATION
- 1973: "Window on My Heart: The Autobiography of Olave, Lady Baden-Powell, G.B.E."
