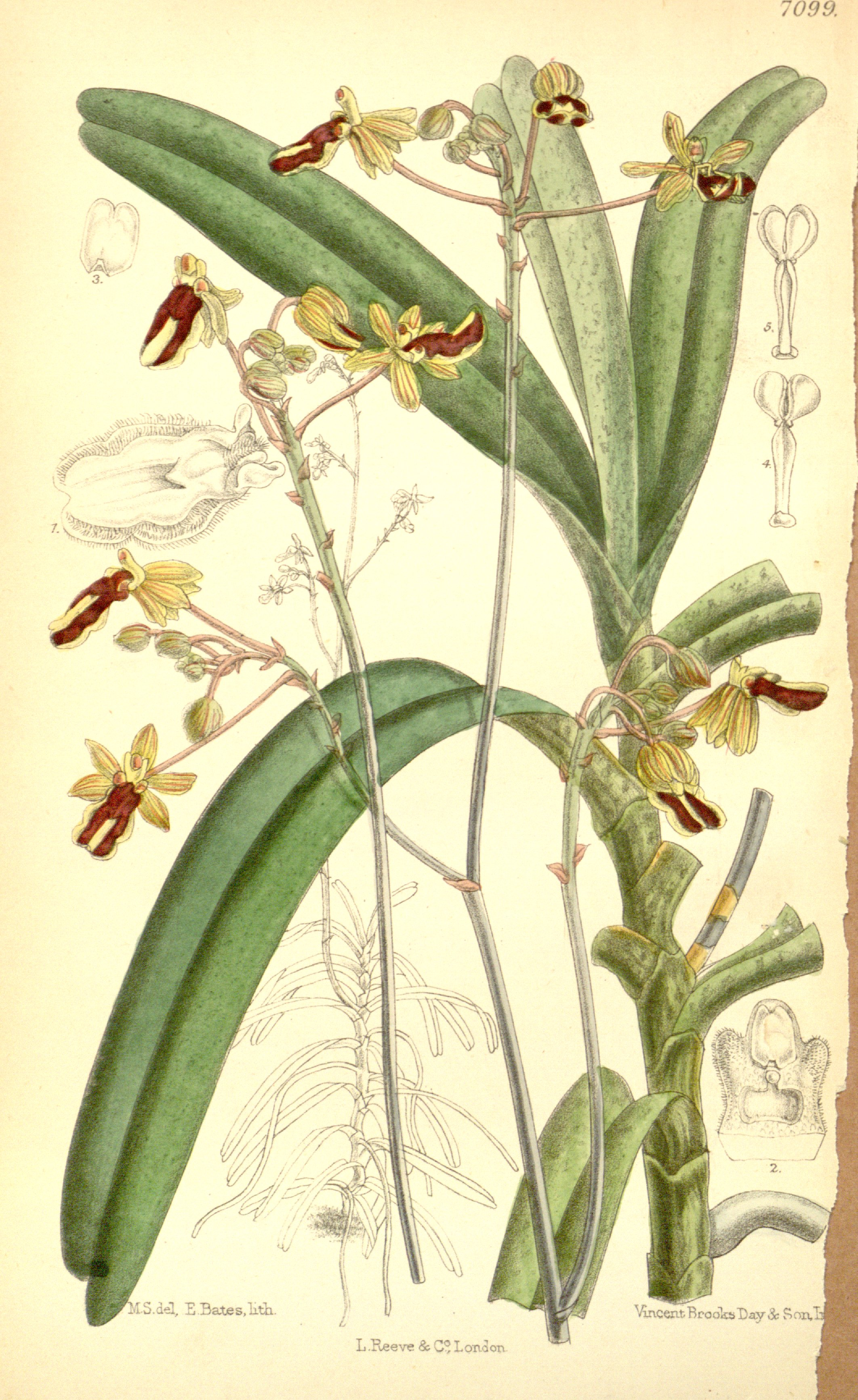
- 1890 illustration from Curtis's Botanical Magazine

Scientific classification
- Kingdom: Plantae
- Clade: Tracheophytes
- Clade: Angiosperms
- Clade: Monocots
- Order: Asparagales
- Family: Orchidaceae
- Subfamily: Epidendroideae
- Tribe: Vandeae
- Subtribe: Aeridinae
- Genus: Cottonia; Wight
- Species: C. peduncularis

Binomial name
- Cottonia peduncularis (Lindl.) Rchb.f.

Synonyms
- Vanda peduncularis Lindl.; Cottonia macrostachya Wight; Vanda bicaudata Thwaites

= Cottonia =

Genus of orchids

Cottonia is a monotypic genus of flowering plants from the orchid family, Orchidaceae: the only known species is Cottonia peduncularis. It is native to India and Sri Lanka. The genus was erected by Robert Wight and named after Major Frederick Cotton, an amateur botanist who served in the Madras Engineer Group and collected the species from Tellichery. A coloured illustration of the plant had been sent to Wight by Thomas C. Jerdon.

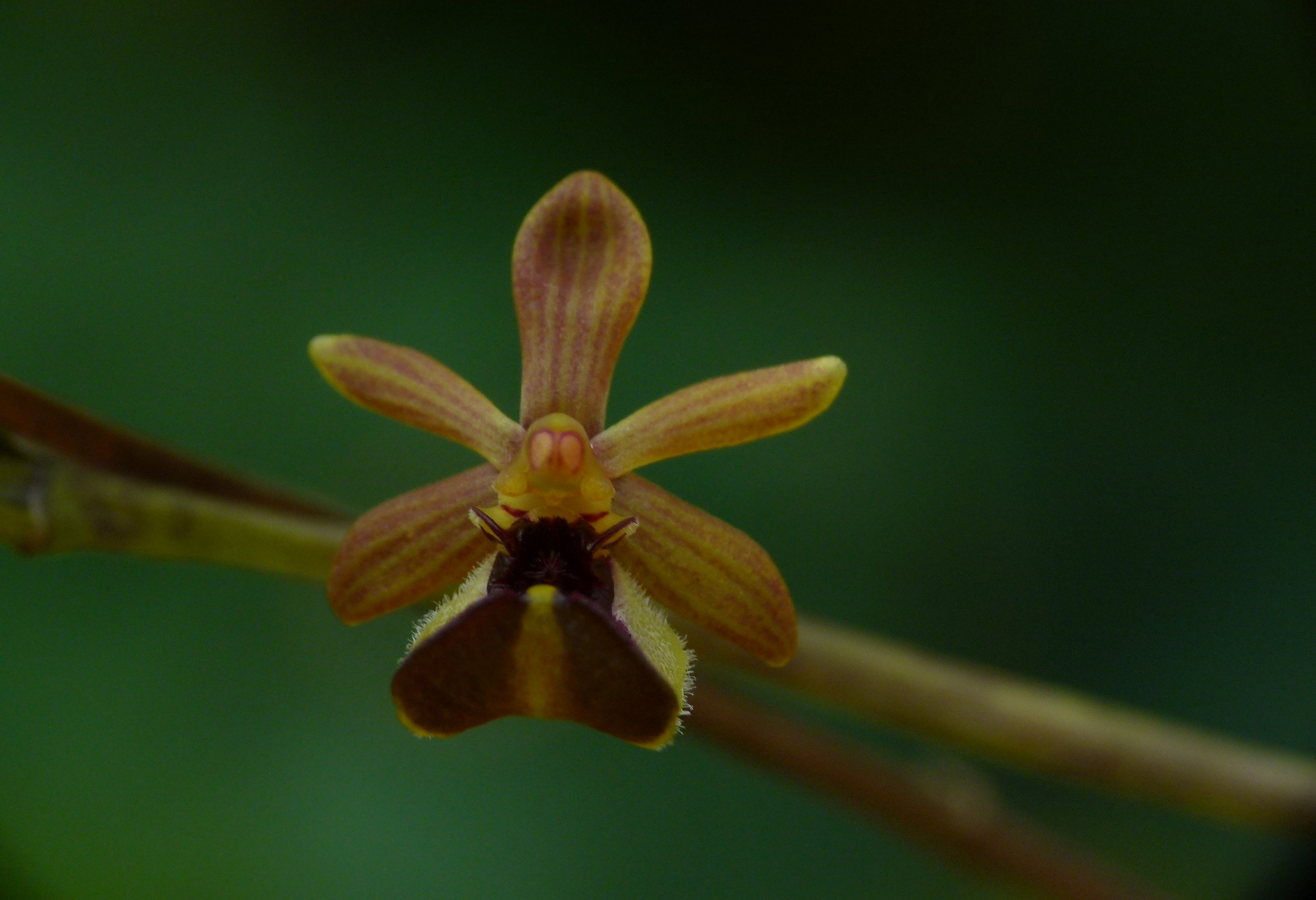

This epiphytic orchid has a lip shaped like a hairy bee (as in the well-known Ophrys apifera) giving it the name of bee-orchid but, unlike species in the genus Ophrys, no specific bee pollinator has been identified. It was first described as Vanda peduncularis by Lindley.

== See also ==
- List of Orchidaceae genera
