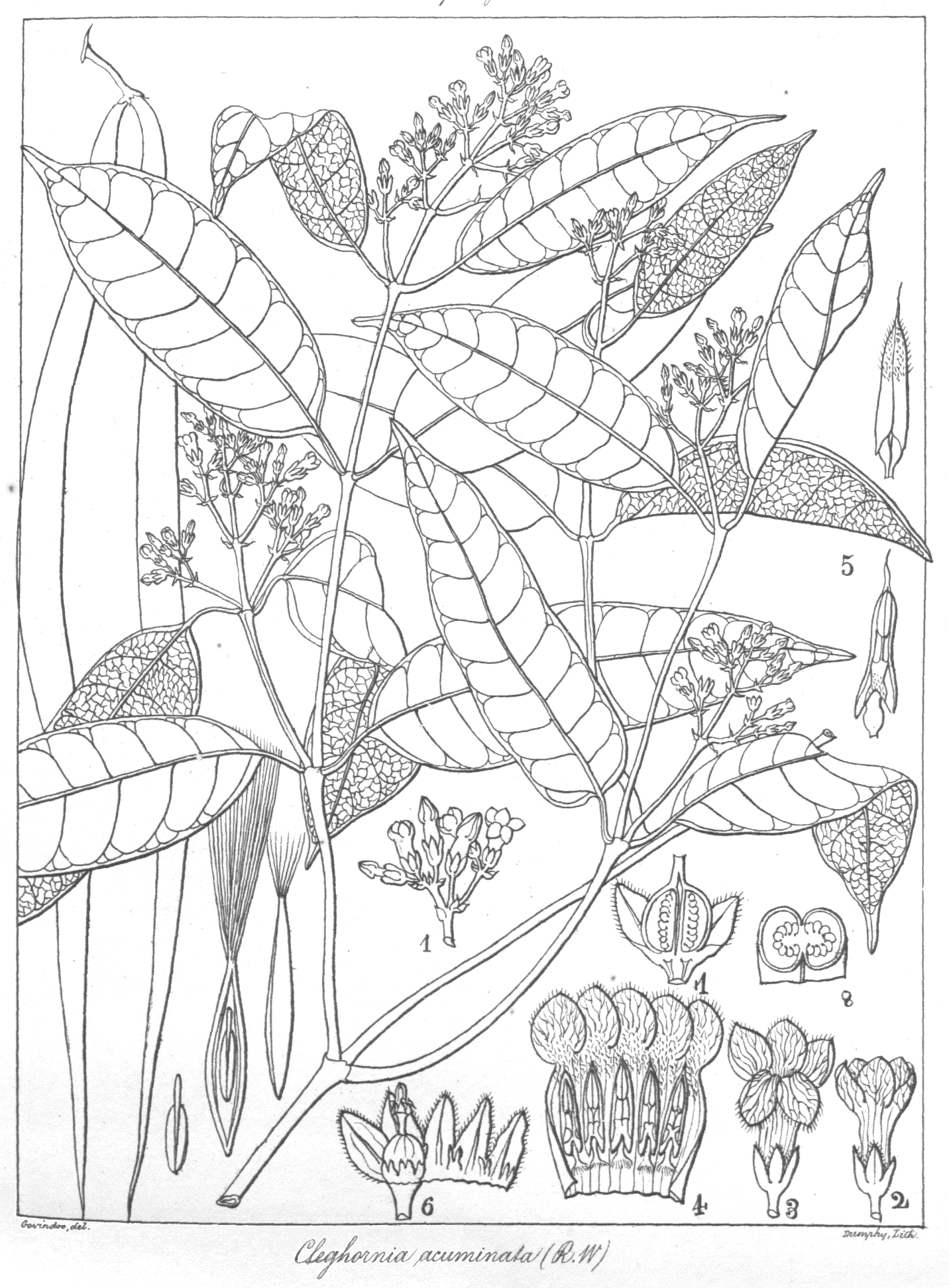
- C. acuminata

Scientific classification
- Kingdom: Plantae
- Clade: Embryophytes
- Clade: Tracheophytes
- Clade: Spermatophytes
- Clade: Angiosperms
- Clade: Eudicots
- Clade: Asterids
- Order: Gentianales
- Family: Apocynaceae
- Subfamily: Apocynoideae
- Tribe: Apocyneae
- Genus: Cleghornia; Wight

Synonyms
- Giadotrum Pichon

= Cleghornia =

Genus of plants

Cleghornia is a genus of plants in the family Apocynaceae. It includes two species, which are native to Borneo, China, Laos, Malaysia, Sri Lanka, Thailand, and Vietnam.

The genus name was chosen in dedication to Dr. Hugh Cleghorn, the "father of scientific forestry in India".

Species

- Cleghornia acuminata Wight - Sri Lanka
- Cleghornia malaccensis (Hook.f.) King & Gamble - Guizhou, Yunnan, Laos, Vietnam, Thailand, W Malaysia

formerly included

- C. borneensis King & Gamble = Anodendron borneense (King & Gamble) D.J.Middleton
- C. chinensis (Merr.) P.T.Li = Sindechites chinensis (Merr.) Markgr. & Tsiang
- C. cymosa Wight = Cleghornia acuminata Wight
- C. dongnaiensis Pierre ex Pit. = Cleghornia malaccensis (Hook.f.) King & Gamble
- C. gracilis King & Gamble = Anodendron gracile (King & Gamble) D.J.Middleton
- C. henryi (Oliv.) P.T.Li = Sindechites henryi Oliv.
