= Grewia oppositifolia =

Grewia oppositifolia is a taxon synonym for two species of flowering plants:

- Grewia oppositifolia Buch.-Ham. ex DC. – synonym of Grewia emarginata Wight & Arn.
- Grewia oppositifolia Buch.-Ham. ex D.Don – synonym of Grewia optiva J.R.Drumm ex Burret
