= Jerdonia =

Jerdonia may refer to:

- Jerdonia indica, a species of plant in the family Gesneriaceae
- Jerdonia (gastropod), a genus of tropical land snails in the family Cyclophoridae
