= Jerdon's day gecko =

Conservation status
- Vulnerable (IUCN 3.1)

Scientific classification
- Kingdom: Animalia
- Phylum: Chordata
- Class: Reptilia
- Order: Squamata
- Suborder: Gekkota
- Family: Gekkonidae
- Genus: Cnemaspis
- Species: C. jerdonii

Binomial name
- Cnemaspis jerdonii (Theobald, 1868)

Synonyms
- Gymnodactylus jerdonii Theobald, 1868; Gonatodes jerdonii — Boulenger, 1885; Cnemaspis jerdoni [sic] — M.A. Smith, 1935; Cnemaspis jerdonii — Kluge, 1993

Species of lizard

Jerdon's day gecko (Cnemaspis jerdonii) is a species of gecko, a lizard in the family Gekkonidae. The species is native to India and Sri Lanka.

== Etymology ==
The specific name, jerdonii, is in honor of British biologist Thomas C. Jerdon.

== Habitat ==
The preferred natural habitat of C. jerdonii is forest, at altitudes of 200–1,900 m (660–6,230 ft).

== Description ==
In habitus, Cnemaspis jerdonii is similar to Cnemaspis kandianus and Cnemaspis gracilis. Its digits are not dilated, but with rather large plates under the basal part, the most distal of these plates being the largest and longitudinally oval in shape. Its upper surface is covered with uniform, small granules, smooth on the back, a little larger and keeled on the snout; a few erect spine-like tubercles are on the flanks. The rostral is four-sided, nearly twice as broad as deep, with a median cleft above; the nostrils are pierced between the rostral and the three nasals; eight to 10 upper and seven or eight lower labials are present; the mental is large, triangular or pentagonal, with small chin-shields passing gradually into the granules of the throat, which are rather large, flat, and smooth. Ventral scales are hexagonal, imbricate, and smooth. The male has five to 12 femoral pores on each side, with no preanal pores. The tail is cylindrical, tapering, and covered with smooth scales, in its basal half with a few scattered larger tubercles; the median series of subcaudals is enlarged. In color, it is grey-brown above, clouded with darker; the small lateral spines are white, sometimes with a black cervical spot; it is whitish beneath, the throat is sometimes brown-dotted.

== Reproduction ==
C. jerdonii is oviparous.
