= Carex caespititia =

Scientific classification
- Kingdom: Plantae
- Clade: Tracheophytes
- Clade: Angiosperms
- Clade: Monocots
- Clade: Commelinids
- Order: Poales
- Family: Cyperaceae
- Genus: Carex
- Species: C. caespititia

Binomial name
- Carex caespititia Nees

Species of sedge

Carex caespititia, also known as cong sheng tai cao, is a tussock-forming species of perennial sedge in the family Cyperaceae. It is native to parts of Asia from Assam in northern India in the west to central China in the east.

The sedge has a long rhizome and slender culms with a triangular cross-section that are 15 to 20 cm (5.9 to 7.9 in) that have a rough texture above. The green leaves are usually shorter than the culms and have a linear blade with a width of 3 to 4 mm (0.12 to 0.16 in) with rough margins.

The species was first described by the botanist Christian Gottfried Daniel Nees von Esenbeck in 1834 as a part of the Robert Wight work Contributions to the Botany of India.

== See also ==
- List of Carex species
