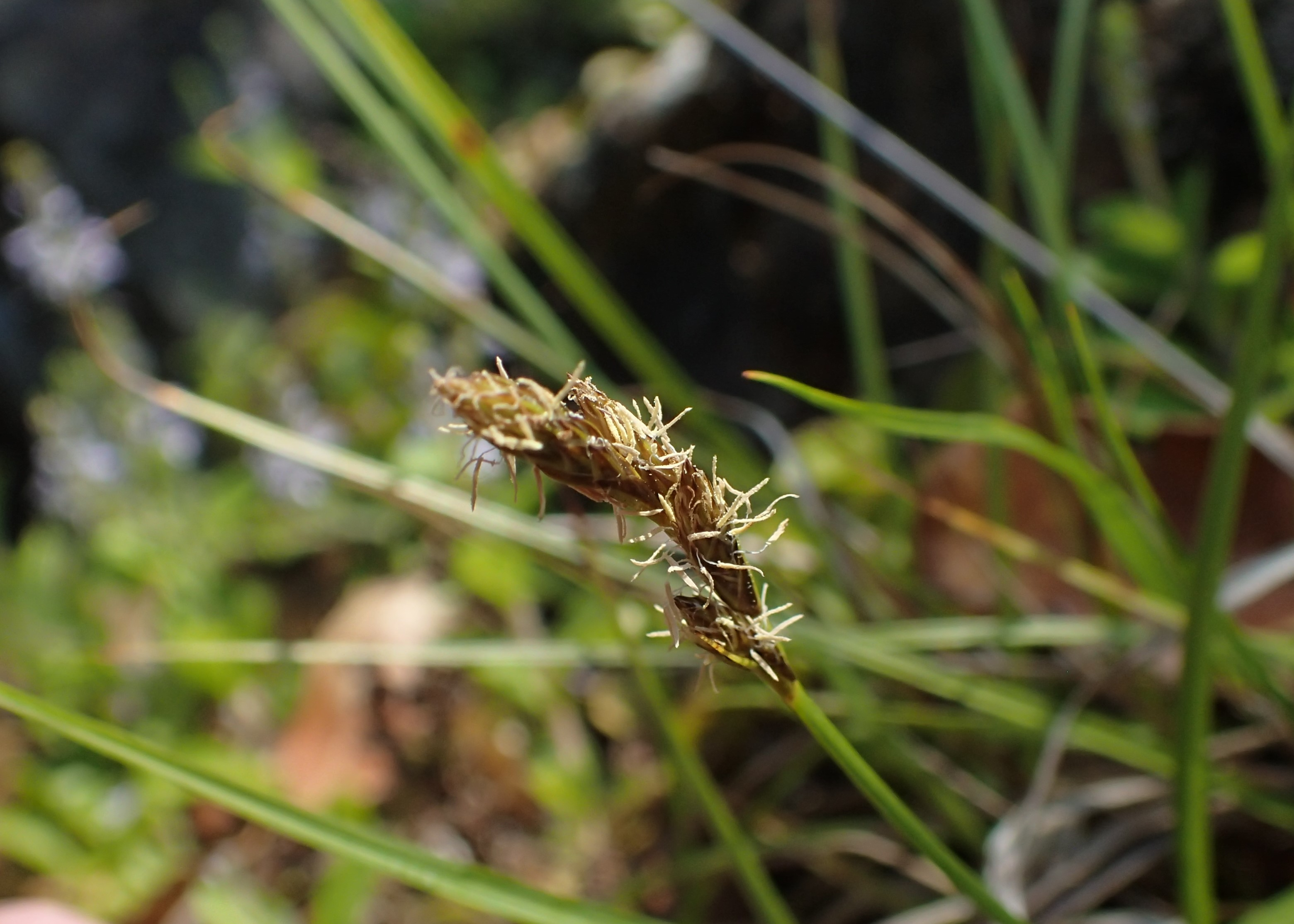

Scientific classification
- Kingdom: Plantae
- Clade: Tracheophytes
- Clade: Angiosperms
- Clade: Monocots
- Clade: Commelinids
- Order: Poales
- Family: Cyperaceae
- Genus: Carex
- Species: C. haematostoma

Binomial name
- Carex haematostoma Nees

= Carex haematostoma =

Species of sedge

Carex haematostoma, also known as hong zui tai cao in China, is a tussock-forming species of perennial sedge in the family Cyperaceae. It is native to parts of central Asia and China.

== Description ==
The sedge has a spreading woody rhizome with smooth and tufted culms that are 25 to 70 cm (9.8 to 27.6 in) in height and are surrounded at the base with pale brown coloured sheaths that disintegrate into fibers with age. The flat grey-green coloured leaves have a linear shape and are shorter than the culms and have a width of 1.5 to 3 mm (0.059 to 0.118 in) and have a small spike at the end. The inflorescence is composed of four to eight spike of which two to four are male. They have a cylindrical to club shape and are the 1.4 to 1.8 cm (0.55 to 0.71 in) in length. The female spikes are more cylindrical and are 1 to 3 cm (0.39 to 1.18 in) long.

== Taxonomy ==
The species was described by the botanist Christian Gottfried Daniel Nees von Esenbeck in 1834 as a part of the work Contributions to the Botany of India written by Robert Wight. The type specimen was collected in India by Duthie et al.

== Distribution ==
The plant is native to the temperate region of Central Asia with a range extending from Kazakhstan in the north west through Uzbekistan, Tajikistan and Kyrgyzstan to Afghanistan and Pakistan in the south west. The range extends east through the Himalayas including Nepal and Tibet and into southern and central parts of China.

== See also ==
- List of Carex species
