= J. indica =

J. indica may refer to:

- Jerdonia indica, the Indian violet, an erect shrub
- Juniperus indica, the black juniper, a species of coniferous tree
