= William Jameson (botanist, born 1815) =

Scottish physician & botanist (1815–1882)

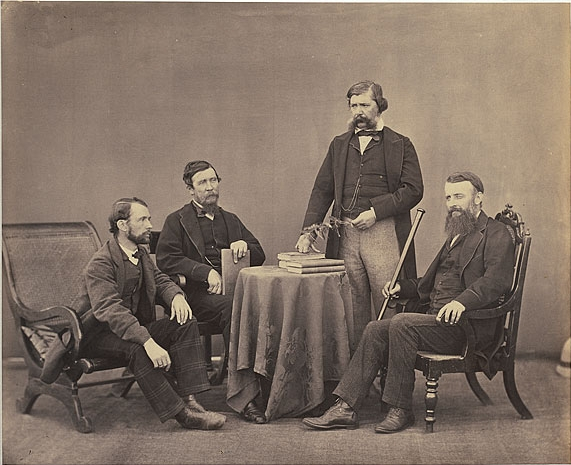
1864 photograph of (left to right) John Lindsay Stewart, Thomas Jerdon, William Jameson, and Hugh Cleghorn taken in Lahore (photographer: Samuel Bourne)

William Jameson CIE FRSE (1815-1882) was a Scottish physician and botanist linked to the massive spread of tea plantations in North India in the 19th century.

== Life ==
He was born in Leith in 1815 the son of Jane Watson (b.1788) and Laurence Jameson or Jamieson (1783-1827), a soda manufacturer at Silverfield. His uncle was Robert Jameson.

He was educated at the High School in Edinburgh then studied medicine at the University of Edinburgh. In 1838 he received a position with the Indian Medical Service based in Bengal. His interest quickly drifted to botany and he was made Curator of the Asiatic Society of Bengal. In 1842 he was made Superintendent of the Saharanpur Botanical Garden. From 1860 he delegated this duty to Dr John Lindsay Stewart whilst he was absent for a year.

In 1863 he was elected a Fellow of the Royal Society of Edinburgh his proposer being John Hutton Balfour.

From 1875, he was Deputy Surgeon-General of India for which he was appointed Companion of the Order of the Indian Empire (CIE).

He died in Dehradun in India on 18 March 1882.

== Publications ==
The standard author abbreviation W.Jameson is used to indicate this person as the author when citing a botanical name.

- Suggestions for the Importation of Tea Makers, Implements and Seeds from China (1852)

== Family ==
He was married to Emily Field.

His cousin was Thomas Jameson Torrie.
