= Edward Waring (disambiguation) =

Edward Waring was a mathematician.

Edward Waring may also refer to:

- Edward John Waring (1819–1891), British surgeon
- Edward Waring (MP) for Bishop's Castle
- Eddie Waring (1910–1986), British rugby league football coach, commentator and television presenter
