= James Michael (forester) =

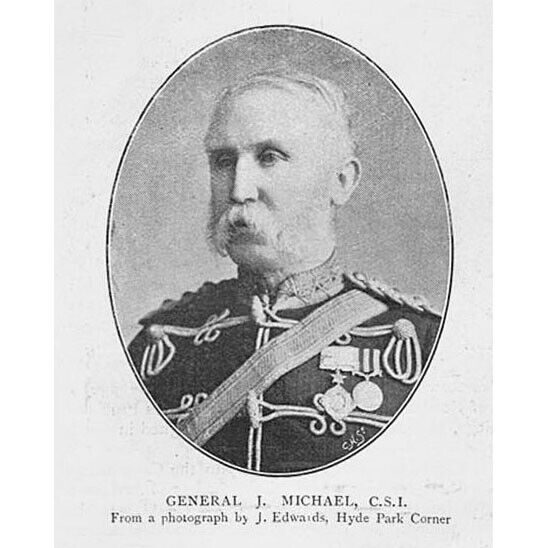

General James Michael (1828 – 17 February 1907) was a British army officer with the Madras Staff Corps who served as a pioneer forester in the Anamalais in India. He later served as a secretary to the government. His work to show that timber operations could be made financially lucrative helped established the Forest Department in India. Sir Joseph Fayrer called him the father of practical forestry in India.

== Life and work ==
Michael was the son of Colonel James Michael. He became a second Lieutenant in the Madras Staff Corps in 1844, becoming a Lieutenant in 1847, Captain in 1856 with the 39th Native Infantry, Major in 1864 and Lt. Col. in 1870. He was promoted Colonel on 10 December 1875 and on 7 March 1876 he was made Companion of the Order of the Star of India. He later wrote on the history of the Madras Army.

Michael was a keen sportsman who became known for routinely shooting 5 elephants in a row. He had spent some time in Switzerland observing forestry operations and he was proposed by General Frederick Conyers Cotton to oversee the forests of the Anamalai hills where timber contractors were supposedly cutting down trees for the Bombay dockyards with little concern for sustainability. He was posted there in June 1848 and after 7 years of working he was forced to resign due to poor health. He established roads, timber slips to move logs down the hillsides and other measures for harvesting. He published a Anamullay Forests Report where he showed how the measures he had taken were yielding financial benefits. His position was later taken up by Hugh Cleghorn who was appointed as the first conservator of forests in 1856. He was also involved in the first forestry exhibition in Edinburgh. He married Mary Adelaide Emma Money in 1867. He served as Fellow of Madras University and as a secretary to the government. After retirement he lived in Berkshire where he became Justice of the Peace.

It is unclear if Michael visited New Zealand but Richard Owen thanks Michael for showing him the bones of Dinornis maximus obtained in August 1865 at Glenmark Estate in the Middle Island, New Zealand. The bones were discovered while digging a drain across a swamp.
