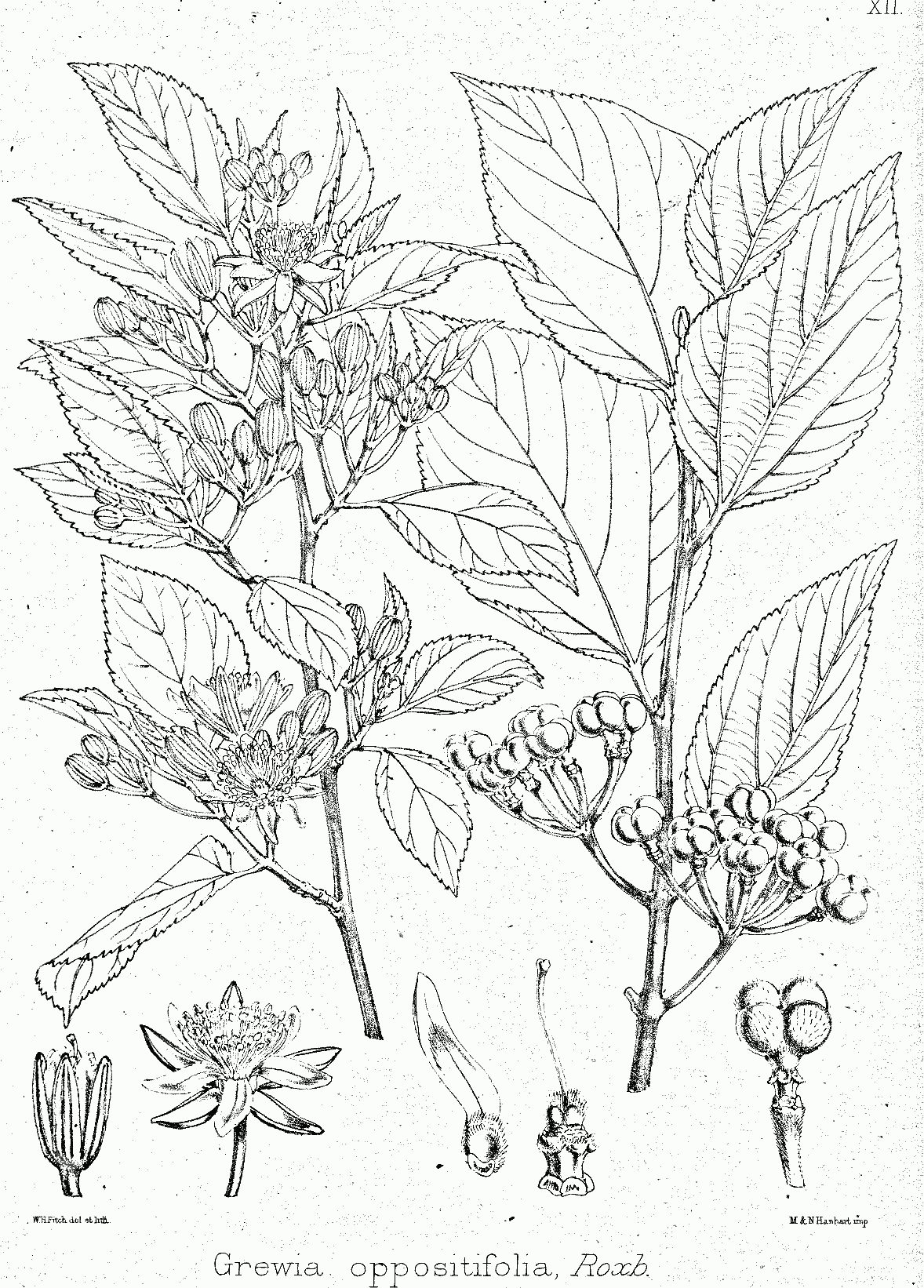
- Botanical illustration

Scientific classification
- Kingdom: Plantae
- Clade: Tracheophytes
- Clade: Angiosperms
- Clade: Eudicots
- Clade: Rosids
- Order: Malvales
- Family: Malvaceae
- Genus: Grewia
- Species: G. emarginata

Binomial name
- Grewia emarginata Wight & Arn.

Synonyms
- Grewia hamiltonii F.Dietr.; Grewia orientalis Roxb. ex Wight & Arn.; Grewia oppositifolia Buch.-Ham. ex DC.; Grewia rhamnifolia B.Heyne ex Dunn

= Grewia emarginata =

Species of flowering plant

Grewia emarginata is a species of flowering plant in the family Malvaceae. It is a scrambling shrub native to the western Himalayas, southwestern India, and Sri Lanka.

It has many similarities with and may be a synonym of Grewia optiva (which, to add to the confusion, has the synonym Grewia oppositifolia Buch.-Ham. ex D.Don); they share a similar range, habitat, appearance, growth form, common names, and local uses as a source of forage, timber, fruit, and medicine.
