= John Lindsay Stewart =

Scottish botanist (1831–1873)

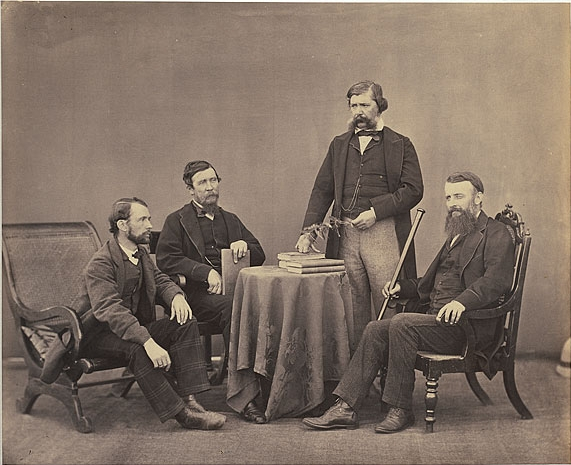
1864 photograph of John Lindsay Stewart, Thomas Jerdon, William Jameson and Hugh Cleghorn taken in Lahore (photographer: Samuel Bourne)

John Lindsay Stewart FRSE FRCS FRGS FLS (13 December 1831 – 7 July 1873) was a 19th-century Scottish botanist remembered for his conservation of Indian forests.

== Life ==
Stewart was born in Fettercairn, Dalladies, where his father was a farmer. He studied medicine at Glasgow University and received his medical degree in 1853. He became particularly interested in botany thanks to the teaching of George Arnott Walker-Arnott. He passed the Indian Medical Service exam and was posted to Bengal in 1856 as an assistant surgeon. In 1857, he was present at the Siege of Delhi, one of the decisive points in the Indian Mutiny.

In 1858, he joined the expedition to Yusufzai and served some time with the Punjab regiments. In 1860, he left his medical duties to become superintendent of the botanic gardens at Saharunpore under the jurisdiction of William Jameson, delegating for him during a year of absence. He had duties overseeing the government tea plantations in the region.

Following Jameson's return in 1861, he returned to medicine as a civilian surgeon in Bijnour. In 1864, he was put in charge of a programme of forest conservation in the Five Rivers region, continuing in this role for five years, and establishing systems echoed in many later conservation projects.

In 1872, he was elected a Fellow of the Royal Society of Edinburgh, his proposer being John Hutton Balfour.

He was allowed to visit England in 1872 to pursue the production of a forest flora of the northern and central region. He died following a nervous breakdown (claimed by some to be the result of a rejection of his work by J.D. Hooker) at the Hill Sanatorium in Dalhousie in India. His position as the conservator of forests in Punjab was replaced by Baden Henry Powell.

== Publications ==
- Punjab Plants (1869)
- The forest flora of north-west and central India (1874, commenced by Stewart but completed by Dietrich Brandis)
