= Frederick Conyers Cotton =

British army officer

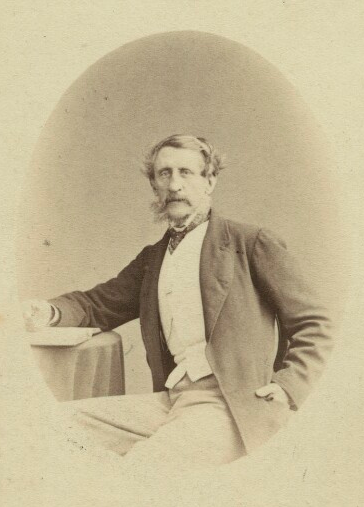
c. 1860

Major General Frederick Conyers Cotton CSI (30 July 1807 – 12 October 1901) was a British army officer who was posted in the Madras Presidency. He was among the first to introduce forestry practices into southern India. He collected wild plants in southern India and the genus Cottonia was named after him.

== Life and work ==
Cotton was the son of Henry Calveley Cotton and Matilda Lockwood. He was born in Southstoke, Oxfordshire. His siblings included Arthur Cotton and Sydney Cotton. He joined the Madras Infantry in 1825. On sick leave he went to the Cape of Good Hope and travelled around southern Africa in Kuruman where he met Robert Moffatt. In 1838 he travelled to Norway, Russia and America. In southern India, he initially worked in the public works department. He served in China during the First Opium War 1841–42 and was made a brevet major on the recommendation of his commanding officer Sir Hugh Gough. He became a full major in 1847 and on returning to India he was put in charge of engineering in Malabar and Canara. He was also involved in supervising the irrigation works started by his brother Sir Arthur Cotton in the Godavari. He spent summer in Ootacamund where he had a cottage named Woodcot. He married Mary Cunliffe, daughter of Brooke Cunliffe and Mary Pirrie in 1849 at Galle. He had an interest in gardening and had a greenhouse beside his Ooty cottage. Around 1847 he had noted that timber contractors for the Bombay Dockyard were damaging the forests between Coimbatore and Cochin and suggested that the British government take up management of the forests on their own. This was first put under the command of Cotton and later under Colonel James Michael who worked for seven years, especially in the Anamalais area. Cotton also examined wild plants and an orchid that he collected and sent to Robert Wight was named after him as Cottonia peduncularis. Wight described Cotton as "an indefatigable collector." Cotton took an interest in plants and in their scientific cultivation. He planted Eucalyptus globulus trees in 1848 at his Ooty home and at Gayton Park (said to be the oldest Eucalyptus in Ootacamund) which were said to be 150 feet tall in 1908. In 1866 he gave a report on the army stations in southern India, particularly those on the Nilgiris. After retirement he lived in Ealing Green with his wife. He became a vice chairman at the Royal Society of Art and in 1878 he was involved in organizing a congress on the water resources in England. He was made Companion of the Order of the Star of India in 1889. He read widely in natural history but was prevented in later life by poor eyesight.
