= Pulney Andy =

Indian medical doctor

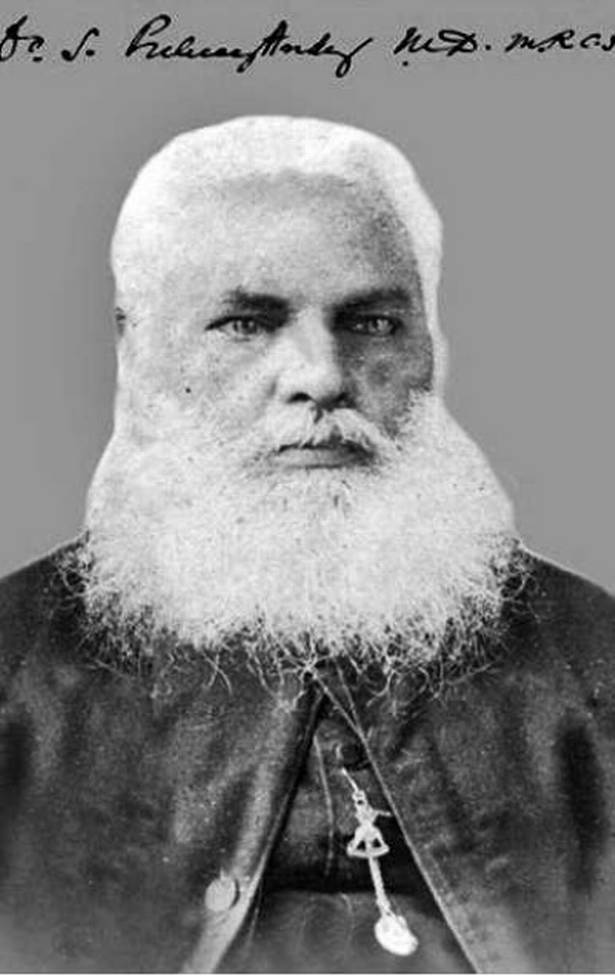
- Born: 1831; Trichinopoly, Madras Presidency, British India
- Died: September 1909 (aged 77–78)
- Occupation: Doctor
- Known for: First Indian to receive a British medical degree

Senjee Pulney Andy (1831 – September 1909) also spelled as S. Parani Andi or S. Parani Andy, was an Indian physician who was the first Indian to have obtained an advanced post-graduate British medical degree (MD) in 1860. He took an interest in medical botany and also attempted to create a Christian sect based on Indian cultural ideals.

Pulney Andy was born in Tiruchirapalli in a family whose ancestors had served the Raja of Senjee or Gingee and had been entitled to use the prefix Senjee. He was educated at Madras Christian College and then went to the Madras Medical College where he studied under Hugh Francis Cleghorn who had a great influence on him. Andy went to the University of St. Andrews in Scotland where he received an MD in 1860 and continued to correspond with Cleghorn. He lived for a while in Smithfield Market, Islington, and his family stopped corresponding when they learned of the prostitution and disrepute associated with the area. His graduation fee was lent by Cleghorn. He became a fellow of the Royal College of Surgeons in 1862 and on his return to India, he was posted as superintendent of vaccination in Malabar. He wrote to the Linnean Society on unusual branching in palms and participated in the discussions of other scholarly societies. He also examined the use of neem as a treatment for smallpox.

Andy was baptised by the Basel missionaries in Calicut on 3 May 1863 but after his retirement he sought to create an indigenous branch of Christianity. He also joined the freemason's movement and was involved in establishing Lodge Carnatic in 1883 where he served as second master. In 1866 he started a National Church of India in Madras. This did not however succeed.

The Egmore Railway station was built on land that had belonged to Pulney Andy.
