= Kandyan day gecko =

Conservation status
- Endangered (IUCN 3.1)

Scientific classification
- Kingdom: Animalia
- Phylum: Chordata
- Class: Reptilia
- Order: Squamata
- Suborder: Gekkota
- Family: Gekkonidae
- Genus: Cnemaspis
- Species: C. kandiana

Binomial name
- Cnemaspis kandiana (Kelaart, 1852)
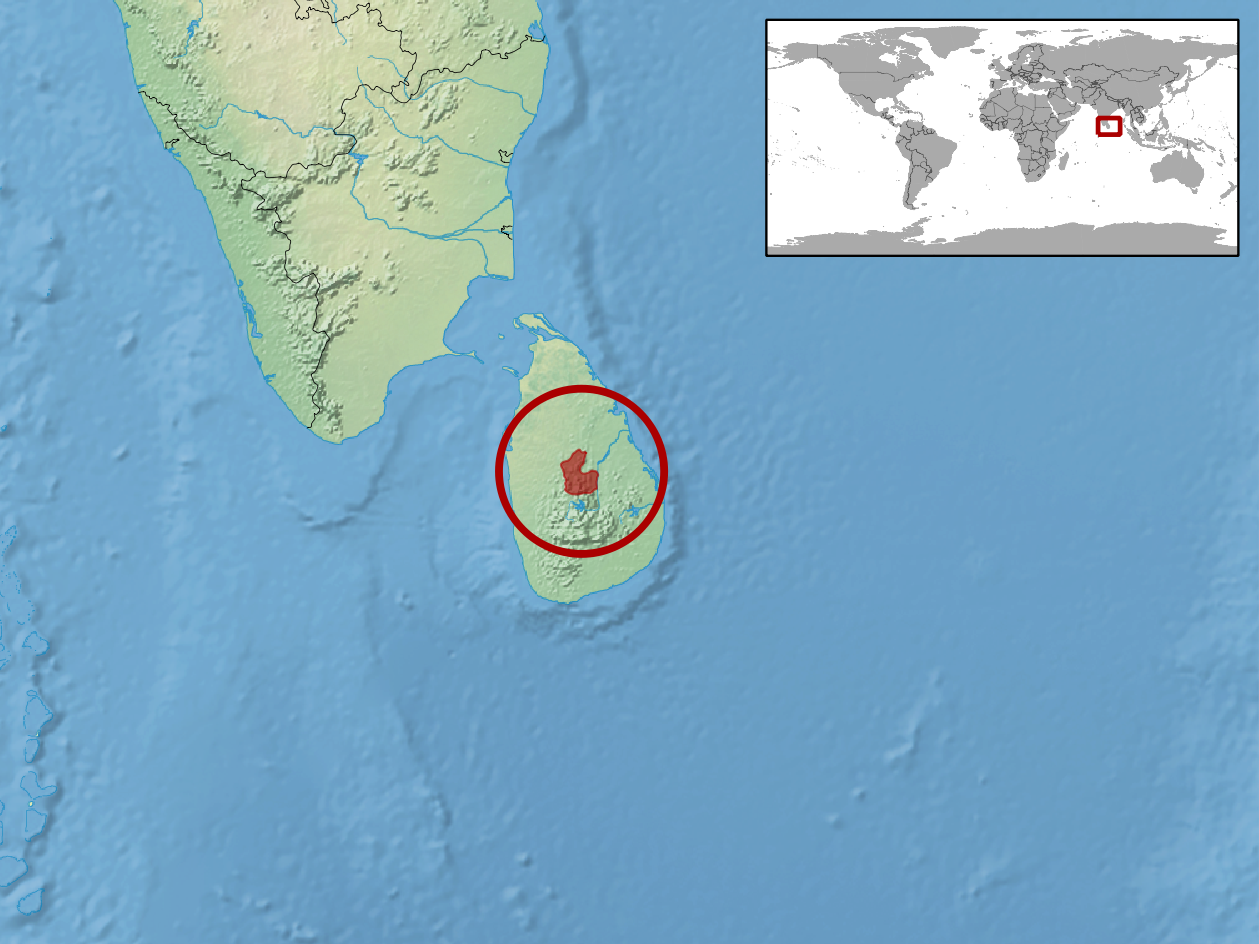

Synonyms
- Gymnodactylus kandianus Kelaart, 1852; Gymnodactylus malabaricus Jerdon, 1854; Gymnodactylus mysoriensis Jerdon, 1853; Gonatodes kandianus — Boulenger, 1885; Rooij, 1915; Gymnodactylus humei Theobald, 1876; Cnemaspis tropidogaster Boulenger, 1885

Species of lizard

The Kandyan day gecko or Kandyan rock gecko (Cnemaspis kandiana) is a species of diurnal gecko found in Sri Lanka.

== Description ==
Its head is rather elongated; the snout is obtusely pointed, longer than the distance between the eye and the ear opening, l.5 the diameter of the orbit; the forehead is not concave; the ear opening is small and oval. Its body and limbs are rather slender; the hind limbs reach the axilla or the shoulder. Its digits are slender, the basal part is not dilated, scarcely wider than the distal, and with enlarged plates beneath. The snout is covered with suboval keeled granules; the rest of the head is minutely granulate; the rostral is twice as broad as deep, with median emargination and cleft above; the nostrils are pierced between the rostral and three or four nasals; seven or eight upper and as many lower labials are found; the mental is large and triangular, with a truncated posterior angle; numerous small chin-shields pass gradually into the gular granules, which are feebly keeled. The upper surface of its body is covered with small, more or less distinctly keeled granules, intermixed with irregularly scattered, small, keeled tubercles; the flanks are small and widely separated, with spine-like tubercles. Scales on the limbs are keeled. The ventral scales are cycloid and imbricated; those under the neck are keeled, and the others are smooth (or keeled in C. k. tropidogaster'). Males have three or four preanal pores, and on each side three to five femoral pores. The tail is cylindrical, tapering, above with very small keeled scales and annuli of spine-like tubercles, beneath with larger scales, but no transversely dilated median plates. In color, it is brown above, variegated with darker and lighter; these variegations generally form transverse markings on the back and tail; sometimes, a light vertebral band occurs; the spine-like tubercles on the flanks are white; its lower surfaces are light brown or dirty white; the throat is sometimes blackish. From snout to vent, it is 1.4 in (36 mm) long; the tail is 1.5 in (38 mm).

The type locality is the mountains of Kandy, Sri Lanka.
