= Edward John Waring =

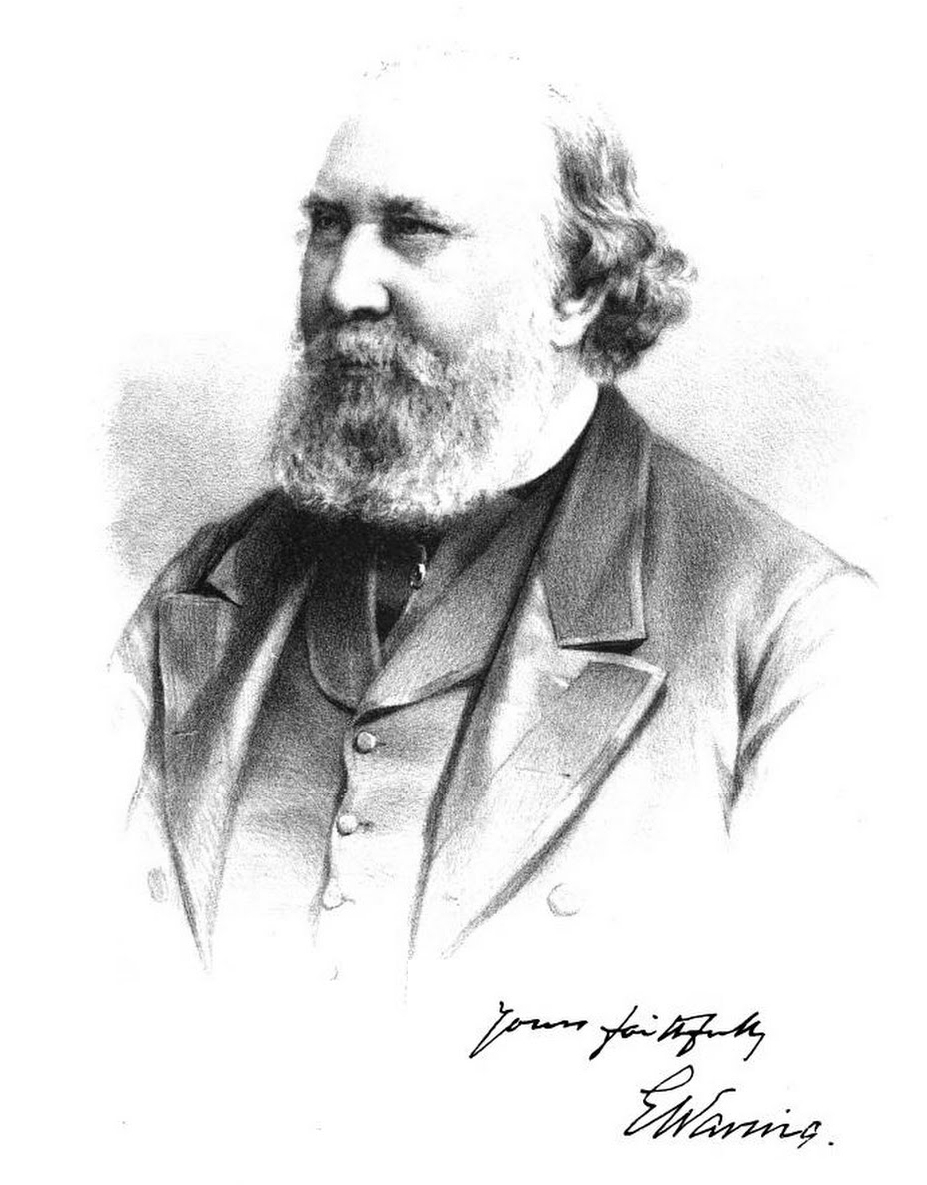
Portrait of Dr. Waring in 1883.

Edward John Waring (14 December 1819 – 22 January 1891) was a Fellow of the Royal College of Physicians of London and a surgeon in the British East India Company. He wrote several books on medicine including A Manual of Practical Therapeutics (1865), Pharmacopoeia of India (1866), and the two-volume Bibliotheca Therapeutica (1878).

== Life ==
Waring was the sixth son of Captain Henry Waring of the Royal Navy and Margaret, daughter of Jacob Henry Franks of Misterton Hall, Leicestershire. A brother of Edward was John Burley Waring while another brother Francis Robert Waring was an anti-evolutionist. Edward was born in Tiverton, studied at Lyme Regis under George Roberts and Ilminster Grammar School under Rev. J. Allen before going to study medicine at Bristol. He then worked at the Charing Cross Hospital and worked as ship's surgeon in 1841 on a voyage to Sierra Leone and then Jamaica. He then went back to practice in Jamaica and in 1843 he was appointed to work with the Emigration Commission. This work involved travel and he spent time in Australia, South Africa, Calcutta, Trinidad and the United States. He married Caroline Anne Day, who came from a wealthy Sussex family, in 1847 and quit practice to live in Uckfield for a while but was forced by financial losses to join the East India Company in 1849 in the Madras Presidency. He worked at Mergui during the Burmese war and during this time he prepared the book on Practical Therepeutics (1854). In 1853 he moved to Travancore as the surgeon to the Resident and served as physician to the Maharajah from 1856. Here he took an interest in botany, influenced by the Travancore Resident William Cullen. During this period he wrote Bazaar Medicines, originally with alternate pages in English and Tamil. Later editions were translated into Malayalam and the Karen language. He also helped establish a school for Indian children of the Pulayar caste, who had been affected by the 1860 famine. The school was run by Rev. Samuel Mateer of the London Missionary Society.

In 1863, he returned to England due to bad health and continued studies to receive an FRCS in 1864, an MD in 1865 and FRCP in 1871. He became an editor of the Indian Pharmacopoeia in 1865 along with a committee consisting of Robert Wight, Alexander Gibson, James Ranald Martin, Daniel Hanbury and other eminent men of medicine. He was made CIE in 1881 and was a Fellow of the Royal Medico-Chirurgical Society and an honorary member of the Société de Pharmacie, Paris. He gifted his collection of books to the Army Medical School at Netley and he supported the London Medical Mission at St. Giles's. He began to lose sight in 1884 but a cataract removal operation restored some sight. He died at his home in Clifton Gardens, Maids Vale on 22 January 1891.

== Works ==
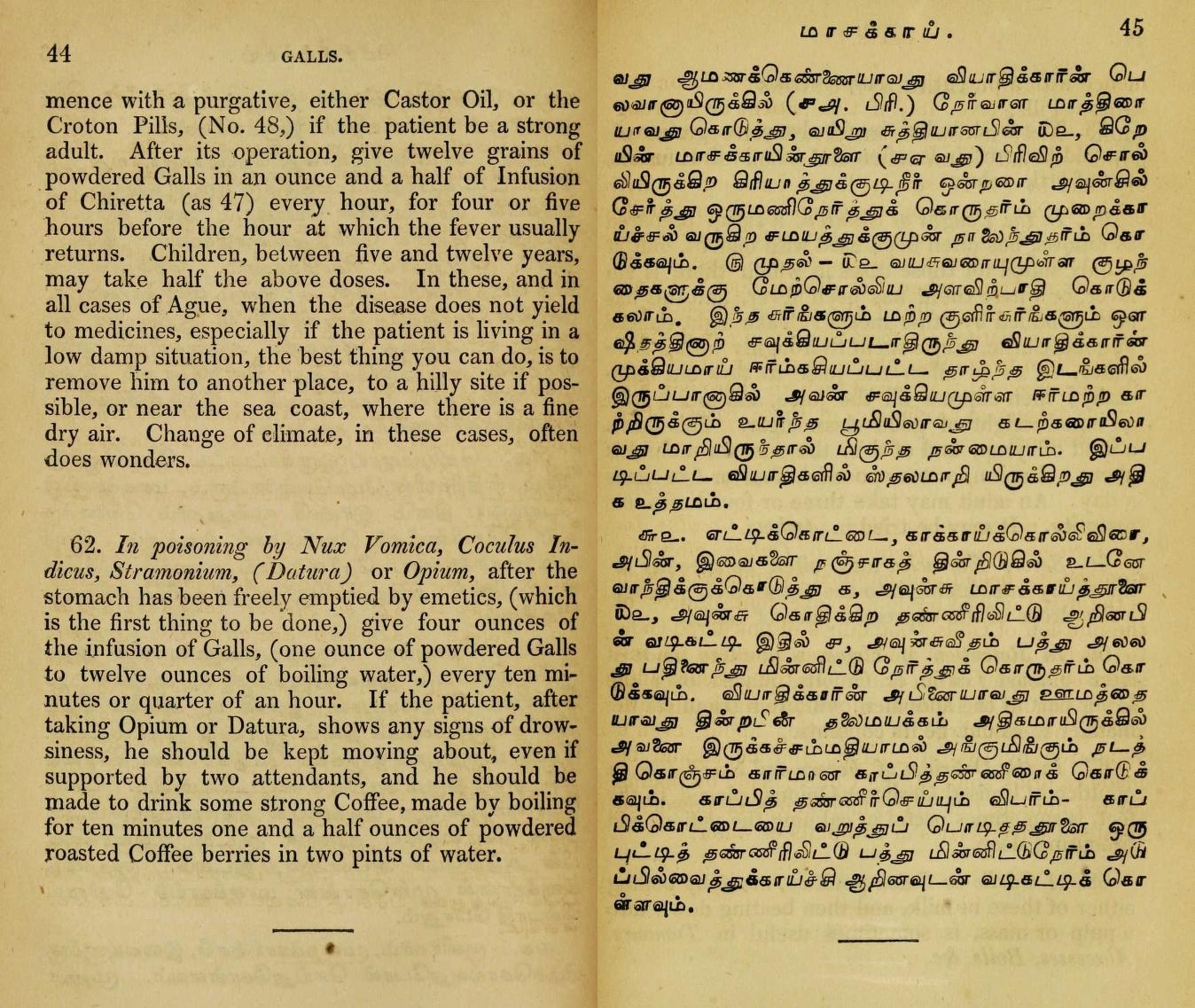
Pages from the 1860 Bazaar medicines

Warings publication's include:

- A Manual of Practical Therapeutics 1854, 1886
- An Enquiry into the Statistics and Pathology of some Points connected with Abscess in the Liver, as met with in the East Indies 1854.
- On Elephantiasis, as it exists in Travancore 1857.
- Notes on the Affection called 'Burning of the Feet' 1860.
- Notes on Some of the Principal Indigenous Anthelmintics of India 1860.
- Remarks on the Uses of Some of the Bazaar Medicines and Common Medical Plants of India 1860 (with Tamil) (5e 1897)
- Notes on Some of the Indigenous Medical Plants of India (Emetics) 1861.
- Notes on Some of the Indigenous Medical Plants of India (Purgatives) 1861.
- The Tropical Resident at Home. Letters addressed to Europeans returning from India and the Colonies on Subjects connected with their Health and General Welfare 1866.
- Cottage Hospitals: their Objects, Advantages, and Management 1867.
- Pharmacopoeia of India 1888.
- The Hospital Prayer Book 1872
- Bibliotheca Therapeutica, or Bibliography of Therapeutics, chiefly in reference to articles of the materia medica Volume 1 Volume 2 1878.
