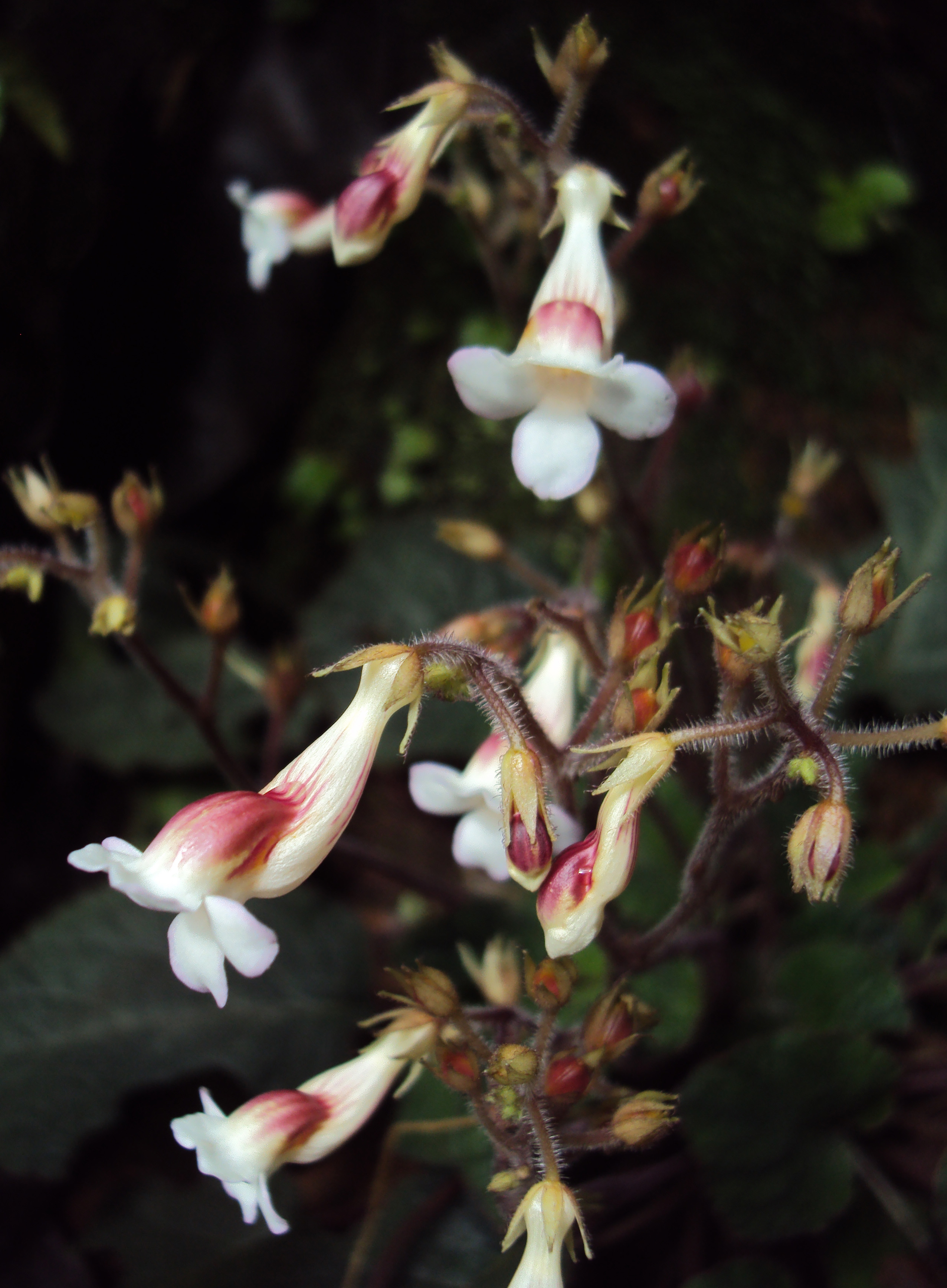
- Jerdonia indica flowers

Scientific classification
- Kingdom: Plantae
- Clade: Tracheophytes
- Clade: Angiosperms
- Clade: Eudicots
- Clade: Asterids
- Order: Lamiales
- Family: Gesneriaceae
- Genus: Jerdonia; Wight
- Species: J. indica

Binomial name
- Jerdonia indica Wight

= Jerdonia indica =

Species of shrub

Jerdonia indica, sometimes referred to as the Indian violet, is an erect shrub endemic to the south Western Ghats of India. It grows to a height of 25 centimetres (9.8 in) and is found in evergreen forests. It is the sole member of the monotypic genus Jerdonia within the family Gesneriaceae.

It was named after Thomas C. Jerdon by Robert Wight, who described the plant in 1848.
