= Alexander Gibson (botanist) =

Scottish surgeon and botanist in India

- Born: 24 October 1800; Lorensk, Scotland
- Died: 16 January 1867 (aged 66); Scotland
- Known for: First Conservator of Forests of India, state management of forests; Dapodi Drawings
- Awards: Ava Medal
- Scientific career
- Fields: Botany, forestry, surgery
- Workplaces: Honourable East India Company; Dapuri botanical gardens
- Author abbrev. (botany): A.Gibson

Alexander Gibson (1800–1867) was a Scottish surgeon and botanist who worked in India. He was born in Kincardineshire and studied at Edinburgh. He went to India as a surgeon in the Honourable East India Company. He became a superintendent of the Dapuri botanical gardens (1838–47) under the erstwhile Bombay Presidency.He was appointed as the first Conservator of Forests of India on 22 March 1847. He published several works on botany and reports on forestry in India. He laid a foundation stone of Indian forestry and made a memorable contribution.

== Early life ==
Alexander was born on 24 October 1800 in Lorensk, Scotland. As a child, Alexander learned from his father religious tolerance, love of nature, and progressive farming skills. He studied Latin, Greek, and natural history at the Mauritius College in Monterrey, Montreux Academy. In 1825, the East India Company sent Dr. Appointed Gibson as ‘Flag Surgeon’. Gibson was awarded the Ava Medal in Burma for his outstanding service. In 1827, Dr. Gibson came to Matunga in Mumbai from Burma after being appointed as an 'Assistant Surgeon' for the Troops of Bombay Horse, Artillery. In 1830, he was appointed for vaccination work in Gujarat, Konkan and Deccan. He could speak Marathi, Hindi, Gujarati. Dr. Gibson interacted with the Bhils and other tribal communities on the cultivation of moha. He built a 'Botanical Garden' in village Hiware in Junnar taluka of Pune district of India. He provided free medical services to the villagers. He introduced new agricultural crops to local farmers here by experimenting on crops like sago, potato, sugarcane. The medical service in India during the late 19th century widely quoted the works of Alexander Humboldt linking deforestation, increasing aridity, and temperature change on a global scale. Several reports which spoke of large-scale deforestation and desiccation were coming up, prominent among them being the medico-topographical reports by Ranald Martin, a surgeon. In another report, Gibson wrote to Sir Joseph Dalton Hooker in 1841 that "the Deccan is more bare than Gujarat" with the ghat mountain trees disappearing fast. He requested Hooker to influence the government to control the forests in the Deccan and Konkan region. This led to the creation of the Bombay forest conservancy and Gibson was made conservator of forests. This was the first case of state management of forests in the world. He wrote two valuable books on Indian flora: Bombay Flora, published in 1861; and Hand-book to the Forests of the Bombay Presidency, published in 1863.

== Service to Forest ==
Due to shortage of timber supply to the East India Company for shipbuilding, in 1840, the Government of Mumbai ordered a survey of the northern forests of the Western Ghats. Given to Gibson. Dr. Gibson conducted the survey on horseback from 1840 to 1844. To avoid the dangers of malaria and toxic gases, Gibson would get up at three in the morning and walk eight miles in the light of a flashlight. Four miles on horseback and four miles from eight o'clock in the morning. He traveled 800 miles for 100 days and traveled from Mumbai to South Karnataka. At that time, a large amount of deforestation and barren and barren lands. Gibson was found. Coal, agricultural implements, wheels, civil works, poles, ammunition trucks, guns, fuel, etc. The vast forest was destroyed for things. In 1842, he recorded that "the locals are ready to cut down trees but are not aware of the importance of planting trees." Regarding handing over the responsibility of the forest to the people, Dr. Gibson advised the government to reconsider and stressed the need to create rules to curb illegal logging. Extra pruning of trees gave people wood. The foundation of social forestry was laid through public participation and partnership. Gibson first underlined the need for proper management of forests. In 1836, the Governor of Mumbai, Sir Robert Grant appointed Dr. Gibson at Dapodi Udyan which was situated on 90 acres along the river Pawana. Gibson emphasized the quality of medicinal plants and crops there. Gibson hired an anonymous Portuguese painter for 26 months at a salary of 20 rupees a month for making sketches of flowering plants in the vicinity of Dapodi and Hiware Garden. Gibson himself took pains to make paintings of 173 plants. These paintings are known as 'Dapodi Drawings'. These original paintings are still preserved in Edinburgh. The agricultural implements Gibson sent to Scotland 177 years ago included local spades, shovels, seed drills, plows, and threshing machines. The bullock cart sent from Junnar is housed in the National Museum of Scotland. He was instrumental in the implementation of forest conservation laws under the East India Company, and he was able to systematically propagandise a forest conservation program with help from Hugh Francis Cleghorn and Edward Balfour. Dr. Gibson wrote over 48 research papers on traditional medicinal plants. His writings were published in the research journal 'Journal of the Agricultural and Horticultural Society of India'.

== Memorial at Junnar ==
A memorial was erected by his wife on the back water of Kukadi River dam. Nearby are also the stone tombs of Gibson's three pet dogs, Lazy, Hector and Tipu. Near the memorial is Gibson's bungalow, where Gibson used to write 'Forest' and 'Garden Report' in the dim light of a lantern on a stormy rainy night, and the stable for horses on which he rode eight miles a day are still in good condition. The rare mahogany tree planted by Gibson two hundred years ago still stands out. The existence of a small dam built by Stokes can be seen here.

Gibson left for Scotland in 1864, where he died during a blizzard on 16 January 1867.
