= Thomas C. Jerdon =

English physician, zoologist and botanist

Thomas Caverhill Jerdon
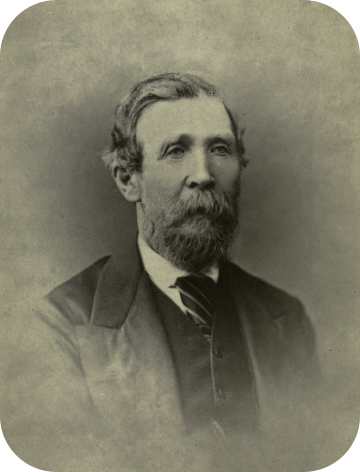
- Born: 12 October 1811; Bournmoor, County Durham
- Died: 12 June 1872 (aged 61); Upper Norwood, London
- Education: Edinburgh University
- Known for: A Catalogue of the Birds of the Indian Peninsula (Madras Journal of Literature and Science, 1839–40); The Birds of India (1862–64)
- Scientific career
- Fields: Medicine, botany, ornithology
- Workplaces: East India Company
- Author abbrev. (zoology): Jerdon

Thomas Caverhill Jerdon (12 October 1811 – 12 June 1872) was an English physician, zoologist and botanist. He was a pioneering ornithologist who described numerous species of birds in India. Several species of plants (including the genus Jerdonia) and birds including Jerdon's baza, Jerdon's leafbird, Jerdon's bushlark, Jerdon's nightjar, Jerdon's courser, Jerdon's babbler and Jerdon's bush chat are named after him.

== Early life ==
Thomas was the eldest son of Archibald Jerdon of Bonjedward, near Jedburgh, and was born at Biddick House, Bournmoor, County Durham.

His early education was at Bishopton Grove near Ripon and later at Bawtry, near Doncaster. His father influenced an interest in natural history and although not a well-known naturalist, he was a careful observer and while Thomas took an interest mainly in zoology, his younger brother became an active botanist. Thomas joined Edinburgh University in 1828 as a literary student but attended classes in natural history by Professor Robert Jameson. He joined the Plinian Society, an association of naturalists (another member of which was Charles Darwin), on 23 June 1829. He graduated as a medical student in 1829-1830 and continued medical studies before obtaining an assistant surgeonship in the East India Company's service. He was appointed on 11 September 1835 and he arrived at Madras on 21 February 1836.

== India ==
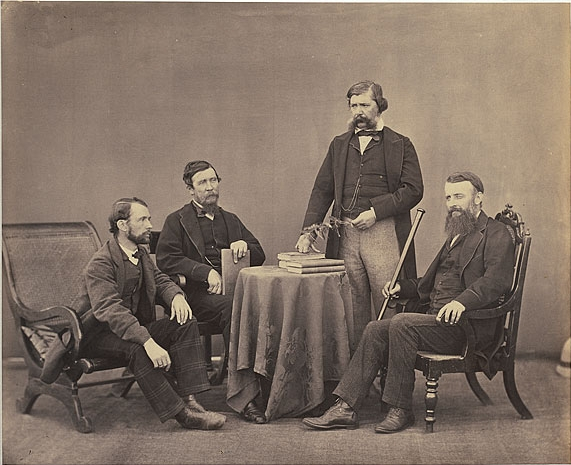
Jerdon (second from left) and other naturalists

His initial work in India was in dealing with fever and dysentery that affected the troops posted in the Ganjam district. During this posting, he described the birds of the Eastern Ghats. On 1 March 1837 he moved to the 2nd Light Cavalry and was posted at Trichinopoly and moved with the regiment to Jalnah in central India. He remained in the Deccan region for the next four years. In 1841 he visited the Nilgiri Hills on leave and in July of the same year he married Flora Alexandrina Matilda Macleod, niece of General Lewis Wentworth Watson. Flora had an interest in botanical art and took an interest in orchids. She was also an excellent guitarist. Around 1845 the Jerdon's lived in their Ooty home Woodside, (Woodside originally belonged to General Watson) and their children were baptised at the local St. Stephen's church.

Six months later he was appointed Civil Surgeon of Nellore. At Nellore, he interacted with the Yenadi tribes and obtained information on local names of birds and studied the natural history of the area. On 25 October 1844 he was transferred to Fort St. George as Garrison Assistant-Surgeon. During this time he took an interest in the fishes of the Bay of Bengal. On 12 February 1847 he was appointed Civil Surgeon of Tellicherry. This position led him to describe many species from the Malabar region including ants such as the distinctive Harpegnathos saltator. He resigned from civil charge on 3 June 1851 and was promoted as Surgeon with the 4th Light Cavalry in Sagar on 29 February 1852. After peace regained following the Indian Rebellion of 1857, he was made Surgeon Major on 1 October 1858.

He subsequently went to Darjeeling on sick leave and studied the Himalayan fauna before joining back into the 11th Native Infantry regiment in Burma and making use of that opportunity to study the region. Around 1861 a mission to Tibet was to be conducted by Captain E. Smythe and Jerdon was to accompany the group (which included John Lindsay Stewart of the Saharanpur Botanical Garden; Capt. Bassevi, meteorologist; and Henry Benedict Medlicott, geologist) as botanist. However, failure to obtain passports from Pekin led to the mission being cancelled. Around the same time Lord Charles Canning, enabled him to take special duty that would allow him to work on the publication of a series of books on the vertebrates of India. This began with his works on the Birds of India, followed by works on the mammals, reptiles and fish. On 28 February 1868 he retired from service and he was given the honorary position of Deputy Inspector-General of hospitals in Madras on 28 October 1868.

While still in Gauhati, Assam he suffered a severe attack of fever and moved to Calcutta to convalesce but his condition deteriorated leading to his return to England in June 1870. In 1871 he became a member of the Berwickshire Natural History Society and joined them on walks. His health however continued to decline and he died at Aubyns Road, Upper Norwood, London, on 12 June 1872, and was buried in West Norwood Cemetery (the memorial no longer stands). He discussed the birds of India with his neighbourhood friend and ornithologist Dresser just hours before his death. Flora died at her home in 40 Marina on 24 August 1910 and was buried at the Hastings Borough Cemetery.

== Natural history ==
Jerdon started collecting birds almost immediately on arrival in India on 21 February 1836. He sent his collections of birds collected during his early travels to William Jardine for identification, but by the time they arrived at Jardine's house in Scotland they had become infested by moths. Jerdon trusted his own identifications from then on, publishing A Catalogue of the Birds of the Indian Peninsula for the Madras Journal of Literature and Science (1839–40). This included 420 species, almost doubling the list produced earlier by Colonel W. H. Sykes.

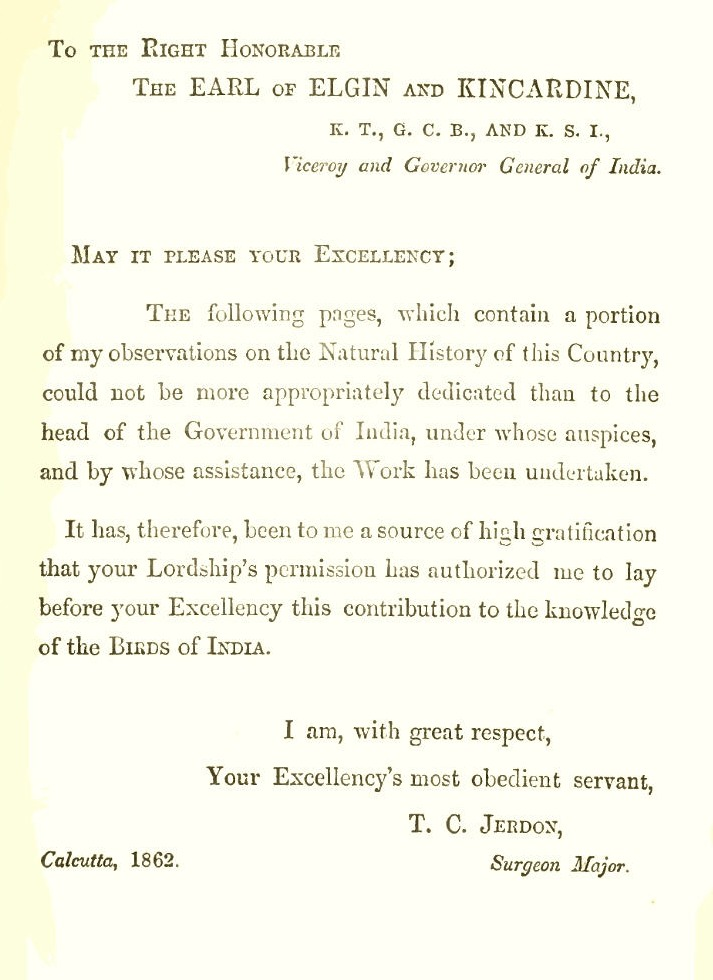
Dedication page from the Birds of India

The want of brief, but comprehensive Manual of the Natural History of India has been long felt by all interested in such inquiries. At the present, it is necessary to search through voluminous transactions of learned Societies, and scientific Journals, to obtain any general acquaintance with what has been already ascertained regarding the Fauna of India, and, excepting to a few more favorably placed, even these are inaccessible. The issue of a Manual, which should comprise all available information in sufficient detail for the discrimination and identification of such objects of Natural History as might be met with, without being rendered cumbrous by minutiae of synonymy or of history, has therefore long been considered a desideratum.
To meet this want it is proposed to publish a series of such Manuals for all the Vertebrated Animals of India, containing characters of all the classes, orders, families, and genera, and descriptions of all the species of all Mammals, Birds, Reptiles, and Fishes, found in India.
Prospectus in his Birds of India regarding the proposed The Fauna of British India, Including Ceylon and Burma.

Jerdon's most important publication was The Birds of India (1862–64), which included over 1008 species in two volumes with the second volume in two parts. This work was dedicated to Lord Canning and Lord Elgin who supported the venture.

It is with no ordinary feelings of regret, that the author has to record here the death of the nobleman to whom this work was dedicated. Thus, two Viceroys under whose patronage this book has been planned and carried out, have, in the short space of two years, gone to their long home. Lord Canning, to whom, he may, this contribution to science owes its existence, ever took a lively interest in its progress, and brought it prominently before Lord Elgin, who warmly seconded his predecessor's views; and the author is glad to see that this liberality has been duty appreciated by the scientific world. He trusts that the next Viceroy will see fit to continue the patronage of Government, to enable the author to go on with the rest of his projected manuals. The volumes on Mammals and fishes are both nearly ready for the press, and if the author's special duty is continued, will be commenced immediately, and finished, he hopes, by the end of 1864.

This work was not without its critics. A reviewer pointed out that Jerdon seemed unaware of the significance of geographic distributions in evolutionary relatedness. Jerdon was an admirer of the Quinarian classification of William Swainson. Jerdon's opinion on Darwin's theory was that it "perhaps, lays too much stress on external and fortuitous circumstances as producing varieties, and not enough on the inherent power of change." The reviewer also pointed out problems in his usage of George Gray's arrangement of the bird classes and states: "In thus following the phantasies of Kaup, and the mad vagaries of Bonaparte (in his latest writings), we cannot believe that Dr. Jerdon has acted well for his own reputation, nor wisely as regards the class of readers for whom his volumes are specially intended." Jerdon documented the local names of many birds although he did not follow a consistent spelling for Hindi and Urdu words.

Jerdon's other major work was the Illustrations of Indian Ornithology in 1844, which included illustration made by Indian artists (some from Trichinopoly), about which he wrote in his later works:

In 1844, I published a selection of fifty coloured lithographs, chiefly of unfigured birds of Southern India ("Illustrations of Indian Ornithology"); and the excellence and faithfulness of the drawings (the originals of all of which were painted by natives, and half the number, also, lithographed and coloured at Madras) has been universally allowed.

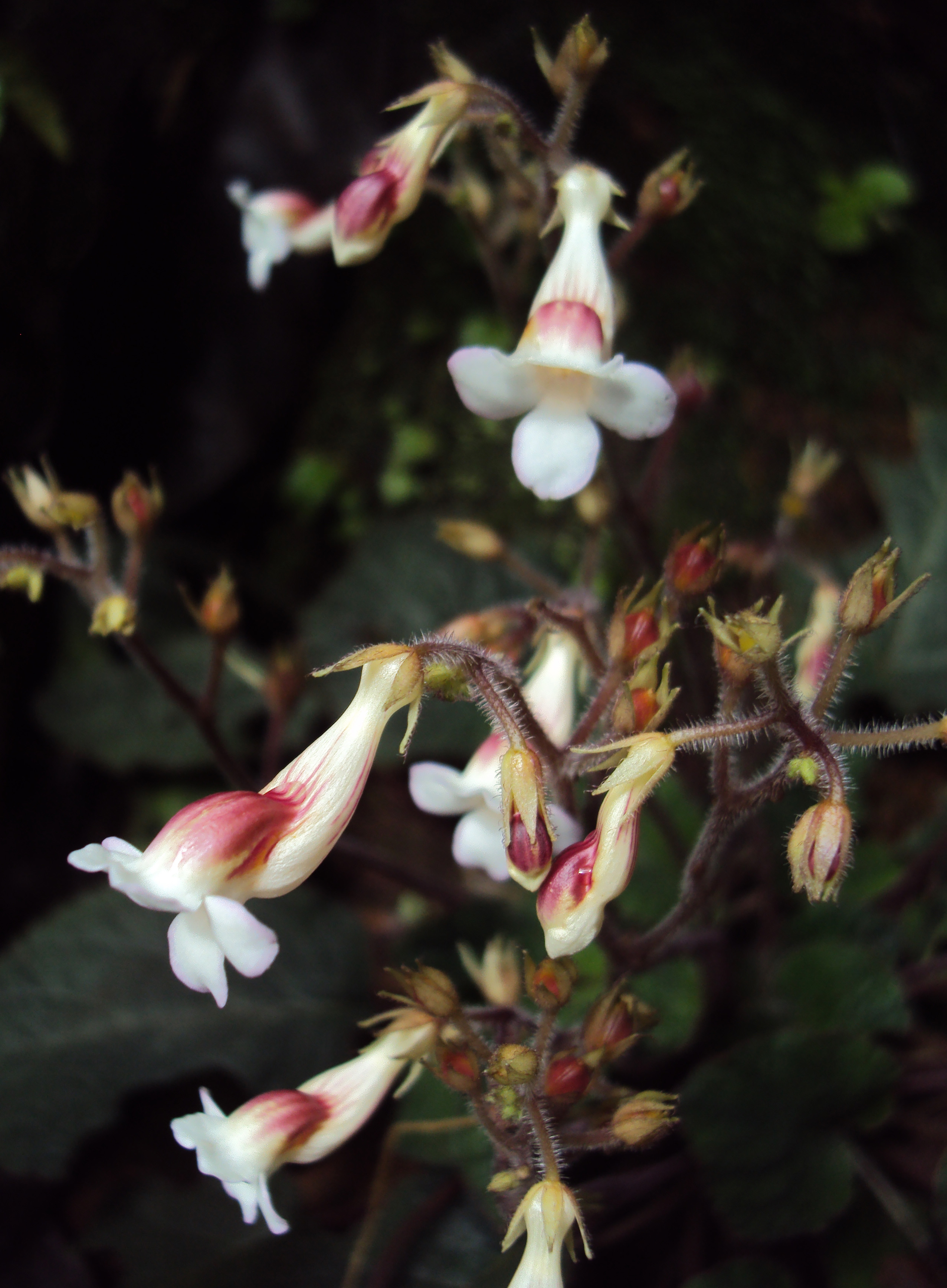
Jerdonia indica

Other works included The Game Birds and Wildfowl of India (1864) and Mammals of India (1874). He had a wide interest in natural history and his studies include descriptions of plants, ants, amphibians, reptiles, birds as well as mammals. Jerdon was instrumental in the birth of The Fauna of British India, Including Ceylon and Burma series. The need for a work on the Indian fauna was felt and it was finally approved by the Secretary of state and was placed under the editorship of W. T. Blanford.

R. A. Sterndale mentions a note from Jerdon on an otter that he kept as a pet (probably at Tellicherry)

As it grew older it took to going about by itself, and one day found its way to the bazaar and seized a large fish from a moplah. When resisted, it showed such fight that the rightful owner was fain to drop it. Afterwards it took regularly to this highway style of living, and I had on several occasions to pay for my pet's dinner rather more than was necessary, so I resolved to get rid of it. I put it in a closed box, and, having kept it without food for some time, I conveyed it myself in a boat some seven or eight miles off, up some of the numerous back-waters on this coast. I then liberated it, and, when it had wandered out of sight in some inundated paddy-fields, I returned by boat by a different route. That same evening, about nine whilst in the town about one and a-half miles from my own house, witnessing some of the ceremonials connected with the Mohurrum festival, the otter entered the temporary shed, walked across the floor, and came and lay down at my feet!

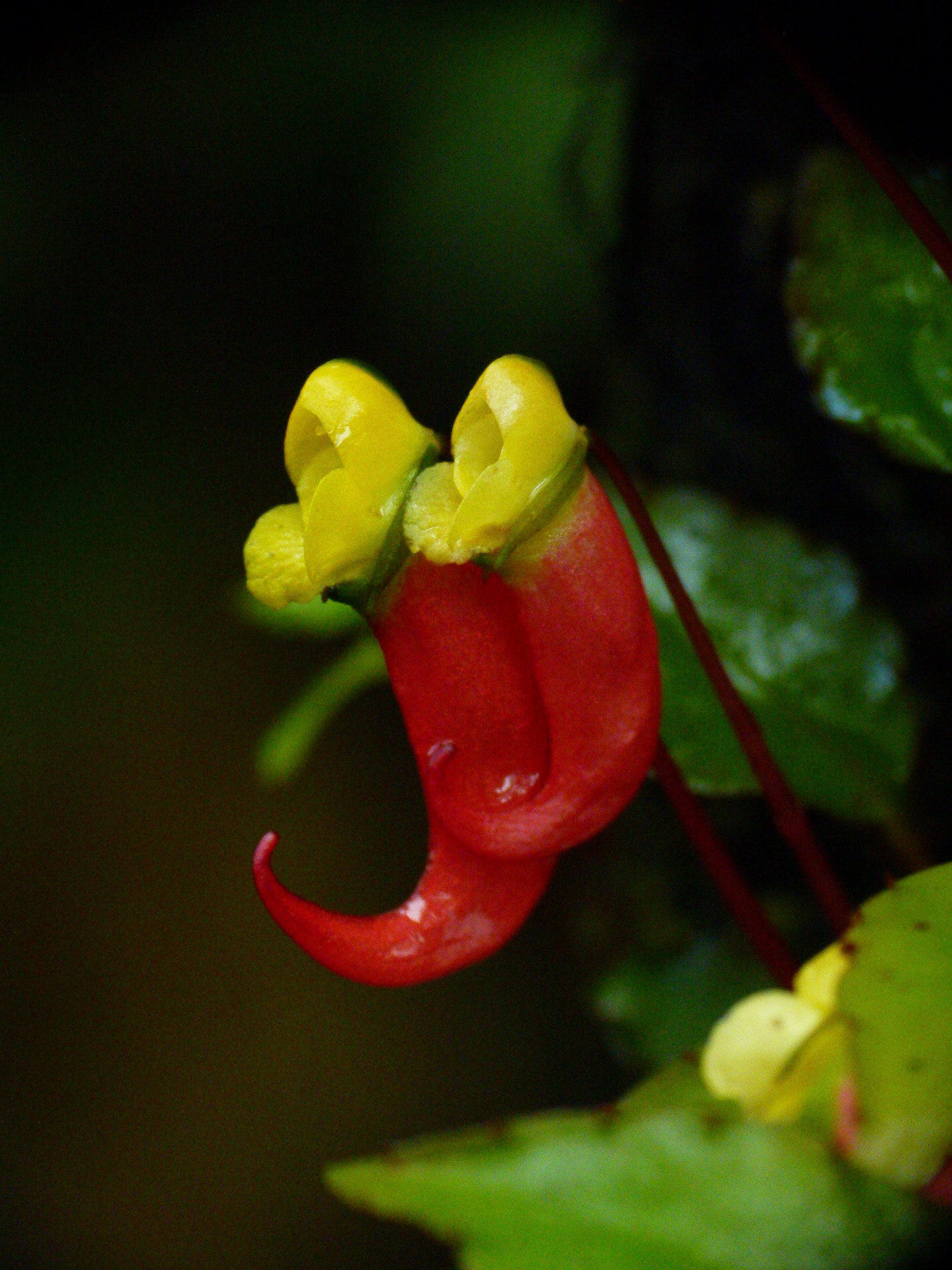
Impatiens jerdoniae was named after Flora Jerdon by Robert Wight

His work on the reptiles of India was not completed and it was only after his death that the proofs were sent to his home. In 1874 several volumes with his original drawings of reptiles were auctioned by Messrs. Sotheby, Wilkinson and Hodge. Some of these illustrations were purchased by Lord Lilford. Apart from zoology, he also took an interest in botany, although he did not publish on the topic and instead communicated notes to botanists such as Robert Wight. Wight notes that:

I am indebted to Mr. Jerdon for this interesting little plant (Jerdonia indica R. W.), which, as forming the type of a new genus, I have much pleasure in dedicating to the discoverer; an honour well merited by his extensive researches in all branches of organic natural history. Though botany is the last to which he has given his attention, it has already reaped considerable advantage from his energetic application to the study of plants

In his personal matters he was said to be careless and forgetful. He often had trouble with his creditors and during the time of his death he was found to be insolvent. Jerdon has also been noted as being rash. On one occasion, he tried catching a cobra by the tail and got bitten on the tip of finger which he slashed with a pocket knife. He was also nearly strangled by a pet python that he kept.

== Eponyms ==
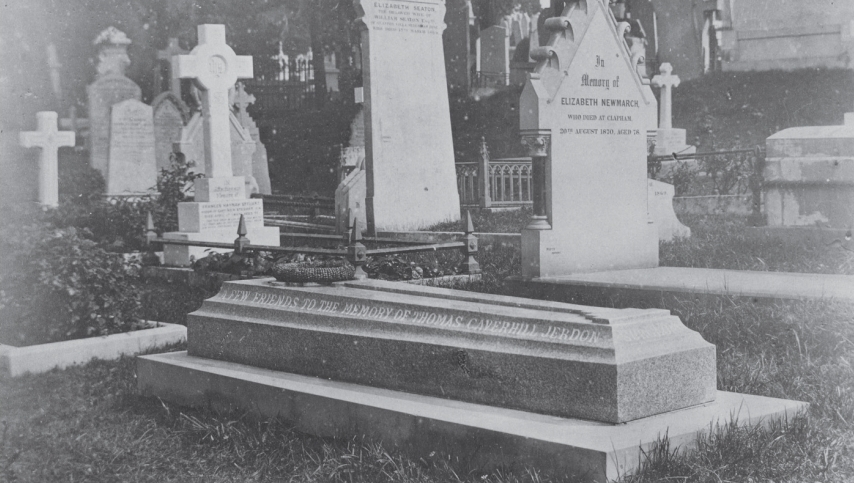
Photo of grave in West Norwood cemetery paid for by subscriptions raised by Henry Dresser. The grave no longer exists.

Jerdon is honoured in the specific names of three species of lizards (Calotes jerdoni, Cnemaspis jerdonii, Ophisops jerdonii) and three species of snakes (Hydrophis jerdonii, Protobothrops jerdonii, Indotyphlops jerdoni). Francis Day named two species of fishes, Hypselobarbus jerdoni and Amblypharyngodon jerdoni, after Jerdon, the latter however is a junior synonym. Jerdon's nightjar is also named after him.

== Writings ==
Jerdon wrote several books and contributed regularly to the proceedings of the Asiatic Society of Bengal and to that of the Madras Literary Society apart from journals abroad including the Ibis and the Annals and Magazine of Natural History. A selection of his writings include:

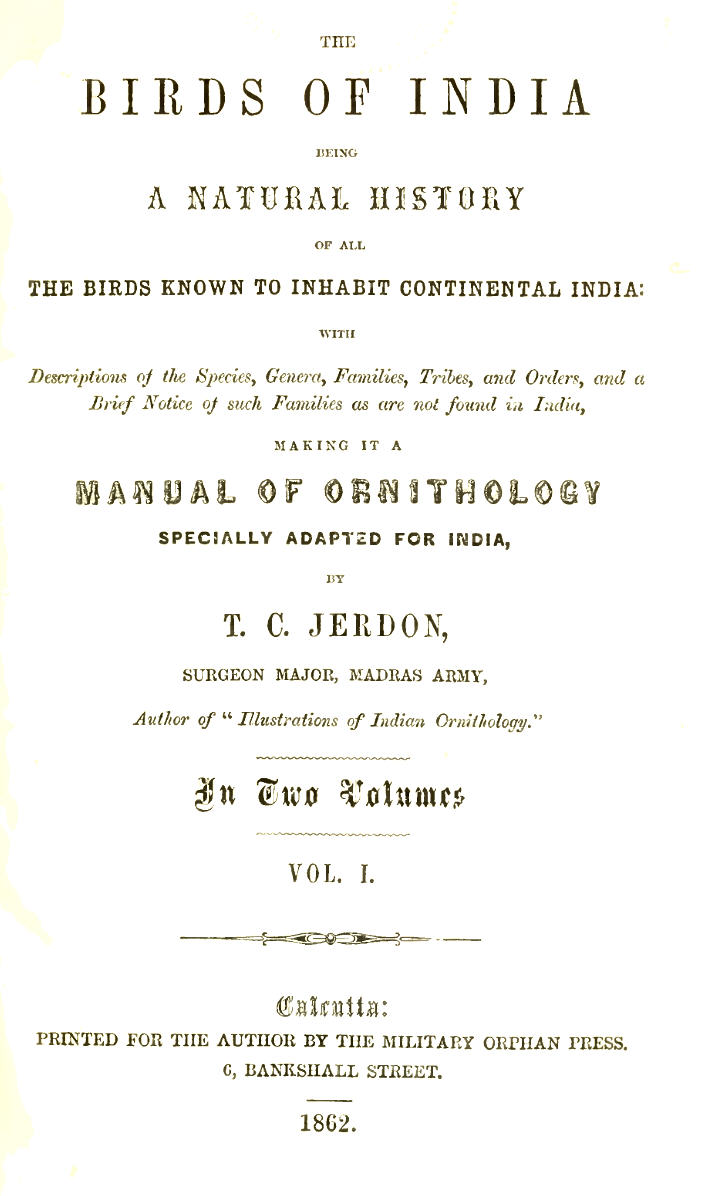
Cover of the Birds of India

- (1840) Cuculus himalayanus sp. n. Madras J. Literature and Science 11: 12–13.
- (1842) Cuculus venustus sp. n. Madras J. Literature and Science 13: 140.
- (1843–1847) Illustrations of Indian ornithology. American Mission Press, Madras.
- (1849) On the fresh water fishes of southern India . Madras Journal of Literature and Science 15:139-149, 302-346.
- (1851) A catalogue of the species of ants found in southern India. Madras J. Lit. Sci. 17:103-127 (reprinted in 1854 as A catalogue of the species of ants found in southern India. Ann. Mag. Nat. Hist. (2)13:45-56, 100-110.)
- Jerdon, T.C. (1851). "Ichthyological Gleanings in Madras". Madras Journal of Literature and Science. 17: 128–151.
- (1853) Catalogue of Reptiles inhabiting the Peninsula of India. J. Asiat. Soc. 153.
- (1863) The Birds of India. Volume I 1857 (30 May 1863)
- (1864) The Birds of India. Volume II, Part I 1895 (20 February 1864)
- (1864) The Birds of India. Volume III 1931 (29 October 1864)
- (1864) The game birds and wild fowl of India (extract from The Birds of India)
- In 1877, a second revised reprint of the Birds of India was produced by H.H. Godwin-Austen, which included some of Jerdon's later papers. Godwin-Austen was also attempting to produce a revised version with added illustrations.
- (1870) Notes on Indian Herpetology. P. Asiatic Soc. Bengal March 1870: 66–85.
- (1874) The mammals of India: natural history. John Wheldon, London.
