= Robert Wight =

Scottish surgeon (1796–1872)

Robert Wight FRS FLS
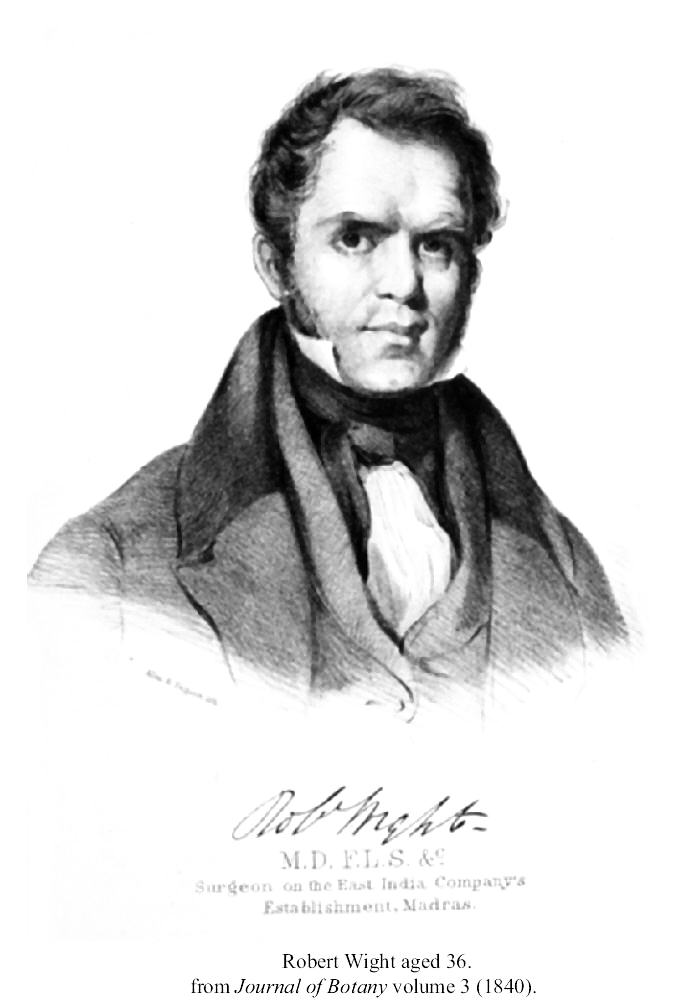
- Born: 6 July 1796
- Died: 26 May 1872 (aged 75)

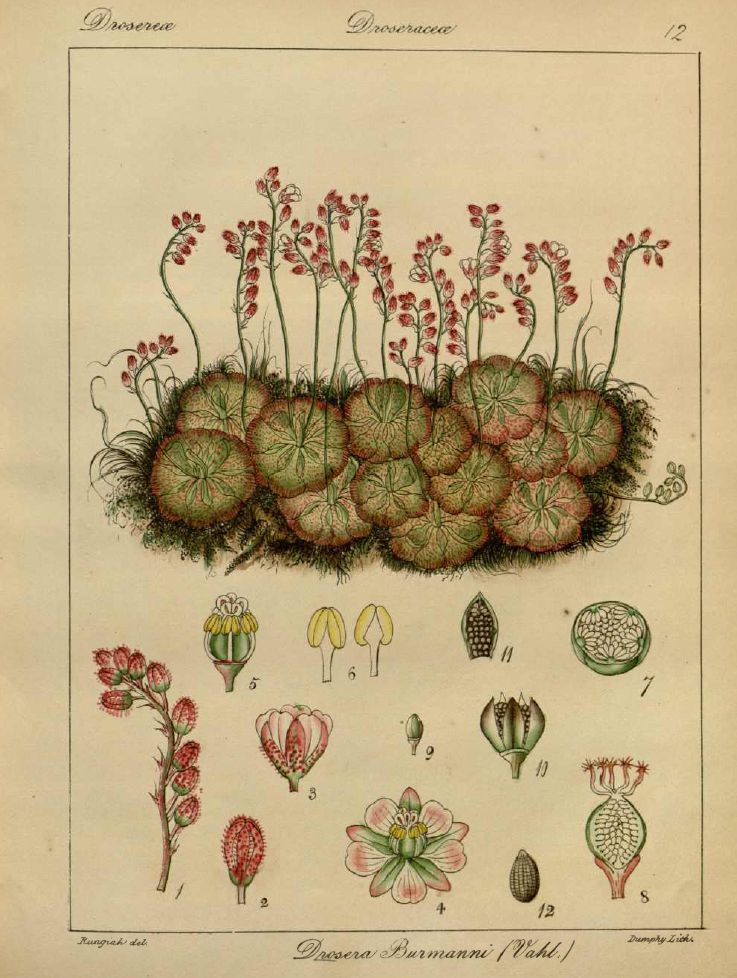
Drosera burmanni by the artist Rungiah from "Spicilegium Neilgherrense"

Robert Wight (6 July 1796 – 26 May 1872) was a Scottish surgeon in the East India Company, whose professional career was spent entirely in southern India, where his greatest achievements were in botany – as an economic botanist and leading taxonomist in south India. He contributed to the introduction of American cotton. As a taxonomist he described 110 new genera and 1267 new species of flowering plants. He employed Indian botanical artists to illustrate many plants collected by himself and Indian collectors he trained. Some of these illustrations were published by William Hooker in Britain, but from 1838 he published a series of illustrated works in Madras including the uncoloured, six-volume Icones Plantarum Indiae Orientalis (1838–53) and two hand-coloured, two-volume works, the Illustrations of Indian Botany (1838–50) and Spicilegium Neilgherrense (1845–51). By the time he retired from India in 1853 he had published 2464 illustrations of Indian plants. The standard author abbreviation Wight is used to indicate this person as the author when citing a botanical name.

== Life and work ==
=== Early life ===
Wight was the son of a solicitor (Writer to the Signet) in Edinburgh who came from a line of East Lothian tenant farmers. He was born at Milton, East Lothian, the ninth of twelve siblings. He was educated at home until the age of eleven after which he studied at the Royal High School in Edinburgh. He obtained a surgeon's diploma in 1816 from the Royal College of Surgeons in Edinburgh. He trained at Edinburgh University, studying botany under Daniel Rutherford in 1816, and graduating MD in 1818. It has been claimed that he worked as a ship's surgeon for two years and went on a few voyages, including one to the USA but this has been questioned.

=== Early work in India ===
In 1819 Wight went to India as an Assistant Surgeon in the service of the East India Company, serving initially with the 21st (afterwards 42nd, which was later commanded by his brother Colonel James Wight) Madras Native Infantry. His devotion to botany was clear from the start and his earliest collections were made around Samalkota, Rajahmundry and Masulipatam in the Northern Circars in the present-day state of Andhra Pradesh. After periods in the Public Cattle Depot at Mysore (Seringapatam) and with the 33rd Madras Native Infantry he was, in January 1826, appointed to succeed Dr James Shuter in the post of Madras Naturalist. In 1828 the Governor of Madras, Stephen Rumbold Lushington, scrapped the Naturalist's post, and its collections (including Wight's own, and earlier ones of Patrick Russell and the Tranquebar Missionaries) were sent to the Company headquarters in London. Wight was redeployed to regimental duties as garrison surgeon at Nagapattinam. From here, in 1828, he began a productive correspondence with William Hooker, Professor of Botany at Glasgow University, sending him plant specimens and drawings by Indian artist Rungiah. Earlier collections from around Madras up to Vellore and from Samalkota and Rajahmundry, sent to Professor Robert Graham in Edinburgh had been unacknowledged and, though said to have been lost at sea, are probably the Andhra Pradesh specimens which are in the herbarium of the Royal Botanic Garden Edinburgh.

=== Return to Scotland ===
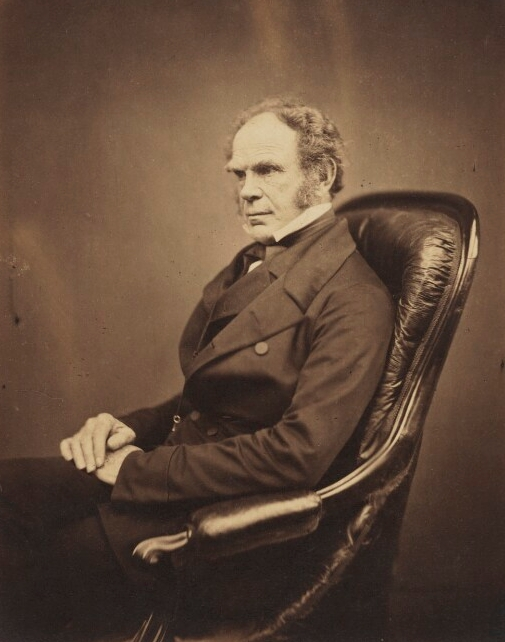
Wight in 1855 from a Maull & Polyblank albumen print (from the NPG)

In 1831, shortly after having been promoted to Surgeon, Wight took a three-year leave to Britain ‘on private affairs’. He took with him to London 100,000 plant specimens representing 3000-4000 species, and weighing 2 tons. Nathaniel Wallich was then in London curating the great East India Company herbarium, which contained the Madras Naturalists' collection. Wight's additions came too late and he had to identify, curate and distribute the collection on his own but Wight was fortunate to enlist the help of his old school and university friend George Arnott Walker-Arnott, who had given up a legal career and was working as a free-lance botanist in Scotland. During this leave, Wight spent much time in Scotland where the two men worked on the collections and distributed up to 20 sets of duplicates to specialists in Britain, Europe, America and Russia. Wight & Arnott embarked on three joint publications: a Catalogue of the herbarium specimens (reproduced lithographically as was done by Wallich), a Peninsular Flora arranged according to the natural system, and a volume of monographs, mainly by other authors, of three significant plant families. Before Wight's return to India in 1834 the first two parts of the herbarium catalogue (with species numbers 1–1892), the first volume of the outstanding Prodromus Florae Peninsulae Indiae Orientalis (up to the family Dipsacaceae of the Candollean system) had been published. Shortly thereafter came the Contributions to the Flora of India under Wight's name, containing accounts of the families Asclepiadaceae (by himself and Arnott), Cyperaceae (by Christian Nees von Esenbeck) and Compositae (by Augustin Pyramus de Candolle). Nees published Wight's Acanthaceae in Wallich's Plantae Asiaticae Rariores, but the only other botanists to intensively examine his collections were George Bentham, who published Wight's Labiatae and Scrophulariaceae and John Lindley who described some of his orchids.

== Return to India ==
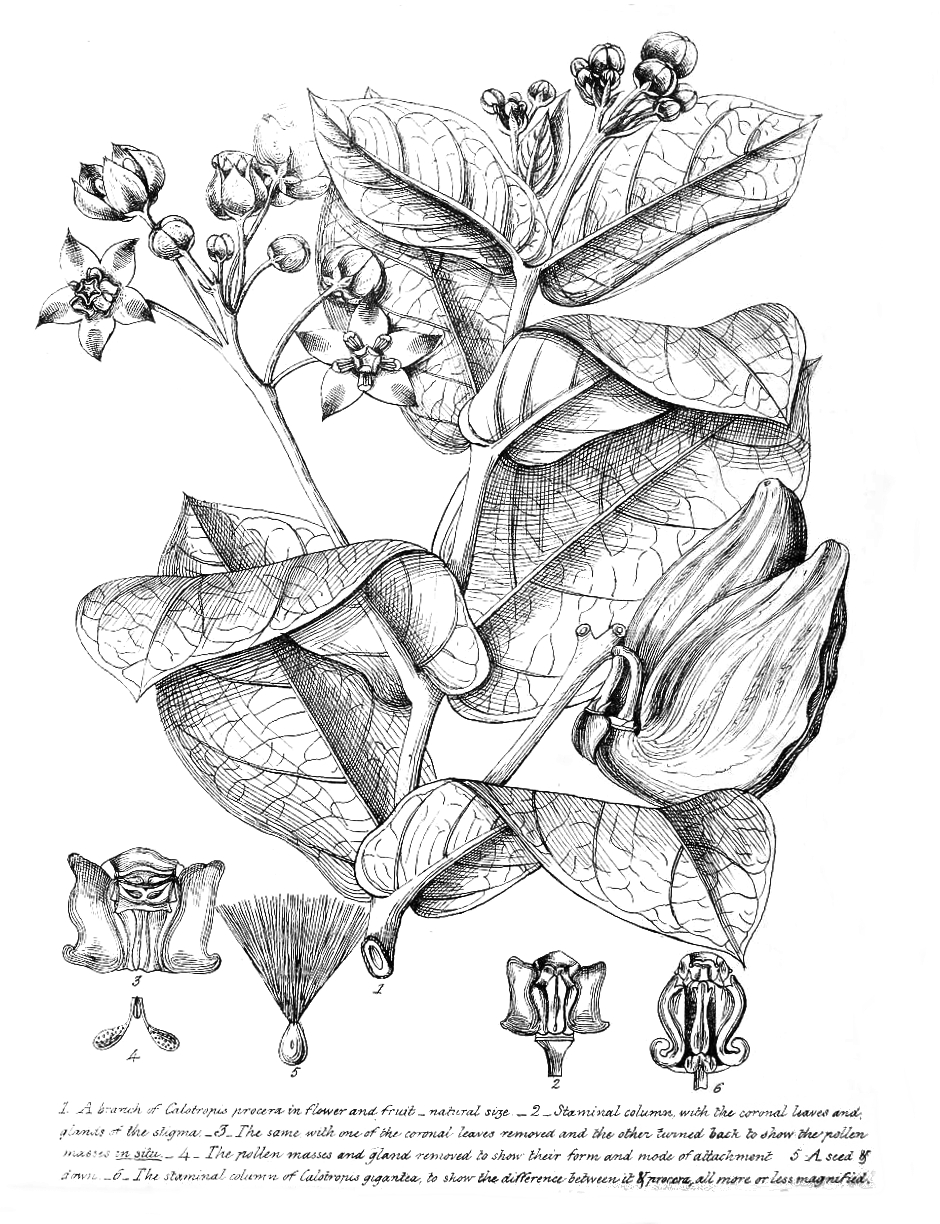
Illustration of Calotropis published in 1835

Wight returned to India in 1834 as a full surgeon in the 33rd Regiment of Native Infantry at Bellary. During this period he began working on the medicinal plants of India, maintaining native botanical artists and publishing brief notes in the Madras Journal of Literature and Science and later became the editor for the botany section of that journal. The papers included one on the medicinal plant ‘mudar’ (Calotropis procera) and on the flora of Courtallam.

=== Economic botany ===
The recognition of Wight's botanical skills led in 1836 to his transfer to the Madras Revenue Department. The transfer was based on references from Hooker and Robert Brown, the Governor Sir Frederick Adam advised by J.G. Malcolmson, and Wight was to report on agriculture and cotton. Over the next six years this work involved species such as tea, sugar cane, senna and, increasingly, cotton. In 1836 he visited Ceylon for six weeks, and he reported on the resources of upland areas including the Palni Hills. In 1841 he purchased a house in Ootacamund, which was to remain the base for his growing family until 1847. In 1842 he was appointed Superintendent of American Cotton Plantations, a post in Coimbatore that he held until his retirement in 1853. This was a major project of the Madras Government with a spending of almost 500,000 Rupees (about £2.5 million in today's terms) to induce Indian tenant farmers (ryots) to grow introduced long-staple American Cotton and to process it using the saw gin, so that it could be exported for spinning and weaving in Manchester. The cotton was grown by ryots on farms that covered a range of soils and climatic regimes from Salem in the north to Courtallam in the south. Wight showed that the new cottons could be grown, though this was difficult without irrigation. The experiment was, however, deemed a failure, though largely due to economic reasons, and long-staple cottons did not supersede indigenous diploid varieties until the early 20th century.

Wight was an early member of the Madras Agri-Horticultural Society, whose garden, next to the Cathedral in Madras, acted as the city's botanical garden. He acted as the Society's secretary at various times between 1839 and 1841, and edited a volume of its Proceedings in 1842. In India Wight published numerous letters and short papers in the Madras Journal of Literature and Science (1834–40), in the various publications of the Calcutta-based Agricultural and Society of India (1838–54) and the Calcutta Journal of Natural History (1845–6).

=== Lithography and publications ===
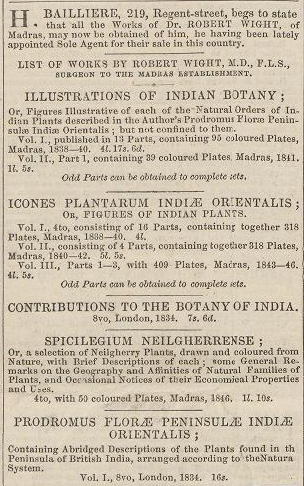
Advertisement for books (1846)

Wight's lasting achievement was the series of illustrated publications on Indian botany. Learning from Roxburgh, who had used expensive engravings, Wight decided to use cheaper lithographic techniques. He began to employ the artist Rungiah (Rungia), who was employed from possibly as early as 1826 to around 1845, and thereafter employed Govindoo. Unlike other British workers of the time, he gave credit to his artists, printing their names on all his publications of their drawings. He named a genus of orchid, Govindooia (now Tropidia), after Govindoo, but could not do so for Rungiah, as a genus Rungia already existed, described by Nathaniel Wallich for an Indian plant named after the German chemist Friedlieb Ferdinand Runge (1794-1867). Wights illustrated publications included the uncoloured, six-volume Icones Plantarum Indiae Orientalis (1838–53) and two hand-coloured, two-volume works, the Illustrations of Indian Botany (1838–50) and Spicilegium Neilgherrense (1845–51).

== Return to England and collections ==
Wight left India after retiring from service in March 1853. He returned to England with poor health and difficulty in hearing. He returned to England and bought the 66-acre estate of Grazeley Lodge near Reading. Although his intention had been to continue with taxonomic research, he got diverted into small-scale agriculture, and published very little thereafter. Eight short articles on cotton cultivation were published in the Gardeners' Chronicle in 1861 and as a substantial pamphlet in 1862. In 1865 Wight was a member of the committee that helped Edward John Waring edit the Pharmacopoeia of India (published in 1868) and in 1866 he read a paper On the Phenomenon of Vegetation in the Indian Spring to the International Botanical Congress in London.

Visiting botanists were welcomed to use his herbarium, but a new generation of botanists had become active in India, including Joseph Hooker and Thomas Thomson. He donated his vast collection of duplicates to the Kew Herbarium, which included 3108 species of higher plants and 94 of ferns, distributed in 1869/70 in 20 sets to herbaria in Europe, Russia, North America, South Africa, Australia and for the first time, to two South Asian herbaria (Calcutta and Peradeniya). In October 1871, shortly before his death, Wight gave his best specimens to Kew, which included the types of the species described in his publications. Other herbaria caring for Wight's specimens include the National Herbarium of Victoria, Royal Botanic Gardens Victoria, and the Plantentuin Meise.

== Personal life ==
Wight married Rosa Harriet(te), the third daughter of a senior Madras surgeon, Lacey Gray Ford in St George's Cathedral, Madras, on 17 January 1838. The couple had four sons and a daughter who survived into adulthood, and two daughters who died in infancy. Wight died on 26 May 1872 at Grazeley Lodge and was buried in the parish church of Grazeley where he had long been a churchwarden. Unlike some of his other medical contemporaries Wight was not successful financially, he left moveable estate worth less than £2000 (about £200,000 in today's terms), and Grazeley had to be sold immediately after his death. Descendants of the daughter of his eldest son James survive although they do not bear his surname.

== Recognition and legacy ==
Wight was elected a Fellow of the Linnaean Society in 1832 and, in the same year, as a member of the oldest scientific society in Europe, the Academia Caesarea Leopoldina-Carolinae Naturae Curiosorum. After his return to Britain, in 1855, he was elected a Fellow of Royal Society of London. In India he was a member of the Agri-Horticultural Societies of Madras and India. He corresponded with the leading botanists of his time including George Arnott Walker-Arnott, Sir William Hooker, Joseph Hooker, William Griffith, Nathaniel Wallich, George Bentham, Christian Gottfried Nees von Esenbeck, John Forbes Royle, John Lindley, Carl Philipp von Martius, John Stevens Henslow, William Munro and Robert Brown.

== Eponymy ==
In recognition of his contribution to Botany, Wight is one of the most highly commemorated of all Indian botanists. Wight named many plants after his botanical collaborators in India and Europe. In 1830 Wallich dedicated the genus Wightia to him and 256 species have been dedicated to him though 19 of these were illegitimate nomenclaturally, and the number is far greater when other combinations made from the basionyms are considered. In addition to flowering plants, this number includes 6 ferns, 3 bryophytes, 2 red algae and one each of clubmoss, brown alga, lichen and basidiomycete. A sample of species named after Wight include:

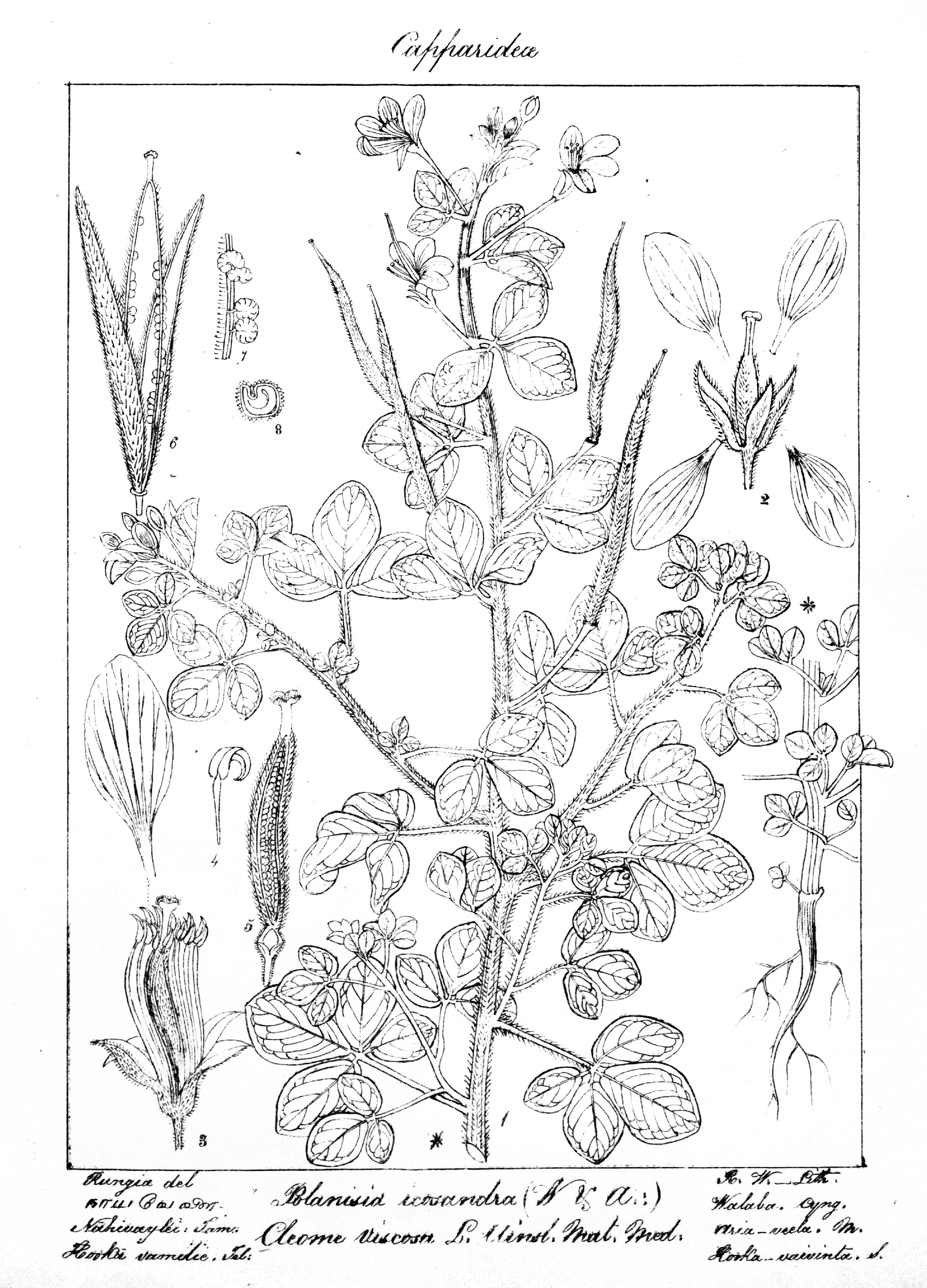
A plate by Rungiah

- Aerva wightii Hook. f.
- Agrostis wightii Nees ex Steud.
- Anaphalis wightiana (DC.) DC.
- Anaphyllum wightii Schott
- Andrographis wightiana Arn. ex Nees
- Andropogon wightianus Nees ex Steud.l
- Anisochilus wightii Hook. f.
- Anotis wightiana (Wall. ex Wight & Arn.) Hook. f.
- Arenga wightii Griff.
- Arisaema wightii Schott
- Arundinaria wightiana Nees
- Beilschmiedia wightii (Nees) Benth. ex Hook. f.
- Blumea wightiana DC.
- Calophyllum wightianum Wall. ex Planch. & Triana
- Carex wightiana Nees
- Celtis wightii Planch.
- Ceropegia wightii Grah. ex Wight
- Chloris wightiana Nees ex Steud.
- Cinnamomum wightii Meissn.
- Cirrhopetalum wightii Thwaites

Variants include Wt. and R.W. Some of his early contributions were mistakenly published by William Hooker with his name as "Richard Wight".

== Cited references ==
- Basak, RK (November 1981). "Robert Wight and His Botanical Studies in India". Taxon. 30 (4): 784–793. doi:10.2307/1220080. JSTOR 1220080.
- Noltie, H. J. (2007) Robert Wight and the Botanical Drawings of Rungiah and Govindoo. Royal Botanic Garden Edinburgh.
  - The Life and Work of Robert Wight. (Book 1) ISBN 9781906129033
  - Botanical Drawings by Rungiah & Govindoo: the Wight Collection. (Book 2) ISBN 9781906129002
  - Journeys in Search of Robert Wight (Book 3). ISBN 978-1-906129-02-6
- Noltie, H. J. (2005). The Botany of Robert Wight. A.R.G. Gantner Verlag. ISBN 3906166406.
- Noltie, H. J. (2005a) Robert Wight and the Illustration of Indian Botany. The Hooker Lecture. The Linnean. Special Issue No 6.

== Other sources ==
- Curtis' Botanical Magazine. 1931. Dedications and Portraits 1827-1927. Compiled by Earnest Nelmes and Wm. Cuthbertson. London: Bernard Quaritch Ltd.
- Cleghorn, H.F.C. (1873). "Obituary notice of Dr Robert Wight, F.R.S.". Transactions of the Botanical Society. 11: 363–388.
- "'The Late Dr. Robert Wight, FRS". Gardener's Chronicle. 50 (22): 731–732. 1872.
- Gray, Asa. 1873. Scientific Intelligence. American Journal of Science and Arts 5, ser. 3. p. 395.
- King, Sir George. 1899. The Early History of Indian botany. Report of the British Association for the Advancement of Science. pp. 904–919.

| Preceded by James Shuter | Naturalist and Botanist to the H.E.I.C. at Madras; 1826-1828 | Succeeded by Position abolished. |
