= John Nicholson =

John Nicholson may refer to:

== In politics ==
- John Nicholson (Yarmouth MP), Member of Parliament for Great Yarmouth 1698–1700, 1702–08
- John Nicholson (New York politician) (1765–1820), United States Representative from New York
- John A. Nicholson (1827–1906), United States Representative from Delaware
- John Nicholson (New South Wales politician) (1840–1919), New South Wales politician
- John Robert Nicholson (1901–1983), Canadian former Lieutenant-Governor of British Columbia
- John Sanctuary Nicholson (1863–1924), British politician and soldier
- John Nicholson (Western Australian politician) (1867–1941), Western Australian politician

== In sports ==
- John Nicholson (footballer, born 1936) (1936–1966), English footballer
- John Nicholson (Scottish footballer) (1888–1970), Scottish footballer
- John Nicholson (racing driver) (1941–2017), New Zealand racing driver
- John Nicholson (football secretary) (1864–1932), 'manager' of Sheffield United F.C.
- John Nicholson (hurdler) (1889–1940), American track and field athlete
- John Nicholson (cyclist) (born 1949), cyclist from Australia
- John Nicholson (Cambridge University cricketer) (1822–1861), English cricketer, played for Cambridge University in 1845
- John Nicholson (Northamptonshire cricketer) (1903–1950), English cricketer, played for Northamptonshire
- Jack Nicholson (footballer) (1892–1967), former Australian rules footballer

== In military ==
- John Nicholson (East India Company officer) (1821–1857), Irish-born military figure known as the "Hero of Delhi"
- John Nicholson (naval officer) (1756–1844), Continental Navy officer during the American Revolution
- John W. Nicholson (born c. 1934), retired U.S. Army general
- John W. Nicholson Jr. (born 1957), U.S. Army general

== In other fields ==
- John Nicholson (bookseller) (1730–1796), English bookseller
- John Nicholson (poet) (1790–1843), 'The Airedale Poet'
- John Nicholson (orientalist) (1809–1886), English independent scholar
- John Henry Nicholson (1838–1923), Australian writer
- John William Nicholson (1881–1955), English mathematician
- Sir John Rumney Nicholson (1866–1939), British engineer
- John Nicholson (author), Australian children's author
- John Nicholson, engine driver and contributor to the invention of the compound steam locomotive
- Jack Nicholson (John Nicholson, born 1937), American actor
- John Lambert (martyr) (John Nicholson, died 1538), English Protestant martyr
- John Nicholson (priest) (1908–1983), Archdeacon of Doncaster from 1955 to 1959
- John Beauchamp Nicholson (1852–?), architect in Brisbane, Queensland, Australia
- John H. Nicholson (1889–1972), vice-chancellor of the University of Hull
- Sir John Nicholson, 2nd Baronet (1911–1993), Lord Lieutenant of the Isle of Wight
- John Gambril Nicholson (1866–1931), English schoolteacher, poet, and amateur photographer
- John Nicholson (harbourmaster) (1786–1863), Australian harbourmaster

== See also ==
- John Nicolson (disambiguation)
- Jack Nicholson (born 1937), American actor
