= William McKerrow =

William McKerrow (7 September 1803 – 4 June 1878) was a Scottish minister of the Presbyterian Church of England who had a particular interest in education. He lived for most of his life in Manchester, England, where he immersed himself in the radical politics prevalent there at the time.

== Early life ==
William McKerrow was born on 7 September 1803. His parents were William and Elizabeth McKerrow, both of whom were very involved with the United Secession Church, which was a small sect formed from a schism of the wider Presbyterian church. He was schooled at Kilmarnock Academy and then attended the University of Glasgow between 1817 and 1823. In 1821, he had joined the Divinity Hall of the United Secession Church and in 1826 he was licensed to preach. A year later, in May, he moved to Manchester to take a position in the Lloyd Street Presbyterian chapel, with which he remained associated for the rest of his life. He was ordained on 7 September 1827.

== Church work ==
McKerrow did much to bring together the Presbyterian church in Manchester and the surrounding areas. He assisted in the foundation of several new churches and also in the creation of the Lancashire presbytery in 1831, as well as in the subsequent establishment of the United Presbyterian Church in 1847. Later, in 1863, he was involved in forming the English synod of that church, of which he served as moderator in 1866–1867, and later still he had involvement in the 1876 union from which emerged the Presbyterian Church of England. McKerrow acted as moderator of this latter organisation in 1877–1878. In addition to these efforts, he also had a significant role in the move of the Lloyd Street Chapel congregation to new premises on Brunswick Street, from which base it became, according to biographer Ian Sellers, "one of Manchester's most influential churches."

== Social and political work ==
Sellers says that McKerrow was "moved by a sense of political and social injustice", perhaps inspired by the environs of Lloyd Street Chapel, which occupied a site in a deprived area opposite Manchester Town Hall. In 1834, following an argument with Hugh Stowell, an evangelical cleric of the Church of England with whom he had disagreed in the columns of the Manchester Courier and Manchester Times newspapers, McKerrow helped form the United Committee of Manchester Dissenters. He was later involved in the establishment of the Manchester Voluntary Church Association in 1839, which was initially based at Lloyd Street Chapel and went on to support Edward Miall and The Nonconformist newspaper.

Aside from these church-related organisations. McKerrow was prominent locally in organising a campaign for the civil registration of births, marriages and deaths in 1837. He was also among the seven founders of the Manchester Anti-Corn Law Association in 1838, all but one of whom were members of his congregation.

During the earlier part of the 1840s, McKerrow campaigned against proposals in Sir James Graham's 1843 Factory Education Bill and also against the Maynooth Grant. He was among the co-founders of the Manchester Examiner newspaper in 1846, with his colleagues including Thomas Ballantyne, John Bright, Alexander Ireland, and Edward Watkin. This newspaper was intended to promote the radical ideas of Manchester Liberalism which were less favoured by the more mainstream Manchester Guardian.

Later in the 1840s, McKerrow was involved with the Peace Society and the United Kingdom Alliance. He was among the founders of the Lancashire Public School Association in 1847, which also began in the Lloyd Street Chapel building and in December 1850, with the assistance of Richard Cobden, became a national body. Other involvements in educational matters included promotion of a model secular school in Jackson's Row, Manchester, and in 1853 he gave evidence on education to a parliamentary committee. He also took part in deputations to parliament. He had been awarded the degree of D.D. by the University of Heidelberg in 1851.

In 1857, McKerrow stood in for Cobden, who was ill, to lead the unsuccessful election campaigns of Bright and Milner Gibson, both of whom were radicals and pacifists. His lectures in 1861 for the Liberation Society, which campaigned for dis-establishment of the Church of England, led to a row with James Bardsley of the Manchester Church Defence Association and in the early years of the same decade he was involved with local relief efforts necessitated by the cotton famine.

McKerrow semi-retired from his church work in 1869 and resigned his pastorate in 1871, having moved to Bowdon, Cheshire, in 1870. Around this time, he was a member of the Manchester Education Aid Society and in 1870 he was elected to the Manchester School Board as an "unsectarian" candidate. He was re-elected in 1873 and 1876. He also established a scholarship to enable board-school children to attend secondary schools, funding it with money given to him at a dinner celebrating his jubilee in the ministry.

== Personal life ==
McKerrow married Anne, daughter of John Begg of Rusholme, Manchester, on 6 March 1829. Having borne him eight children, she died in 1863. McKerrow himself died on 4 June 1878 in Bowdon of congestion of the lungs and was buried at Ardwick cemetery in Manchester. Among his children were the Reverend James Muir McKerrow, who wrote a biography of his father, and John Begg McKerrow, who became an alderman of Salford. The Shakespeare scholar and bibliographer Ronald Brunlees McKerrow was among his grandchildren.
