= Abraham Walter Paulton =

English politician and journalist

Abraham Walter Paulton (1812–1876) was an English politician and journalist.

== Life ==
He was son of Walter Paulton of Bolton, Lancashire, where he was born into a Roman Catholic family. He was sent to Stonyhurst College to be educated for the priesthood, but on leaving at the age of sixteen or seventeen he was apprenticed to a surgeon named Rainforth at Bolton.

Paulton took interest in politics, especially in the Corn Laws, and became a public speaker. In July 1838 he was in the Bolton Theatre when a lecturer on the corn laws faltered. Paulton took the stage, succeeded with audience, and undertook to lecture on the same subject the following week. Paulton gave up on the medical profession, was introduced to Richard Cobden, and engaged himself as a lecturer for the Anti-Corn-Law League.

Paulton was asked in April 1839 to edit the Anti-Corn-Law Circular (Anti-Bread-Tax Circular from April 1841) published in Manchester. It was succeeded in September 1843 by the League newspaper, which had its headquarters in London, and Paulton moved there as editor. The operations of the League were brought to a close in 1846 by the repeal of the corn laws, and in 1848 Paulton returned to Manchester, and with Henry Rawson, purchased the Manchester Times, a newspaper representing the views of the more advanced section of the Liberal party. It was later amalgamated with the Manchester Examiner, becoming the Examiner and Times. It was run by Paulton from 1848 to 1854. His successor as editor was Henry Dunckley.

In 1854 Paulton married the daughter of James Mellor of Liverpool, and from that time resided in London, or at his country house, Boughton Hall, Surrey. He died at Boughton Hall, on 6 June 1876, leaving a son and a daughter, and was buried at Kensal Green cemetery.

== See also ==
- James Mellor Paulton
