= Alexander Ireland (journalist) =

Scottish writer (1810–1894)

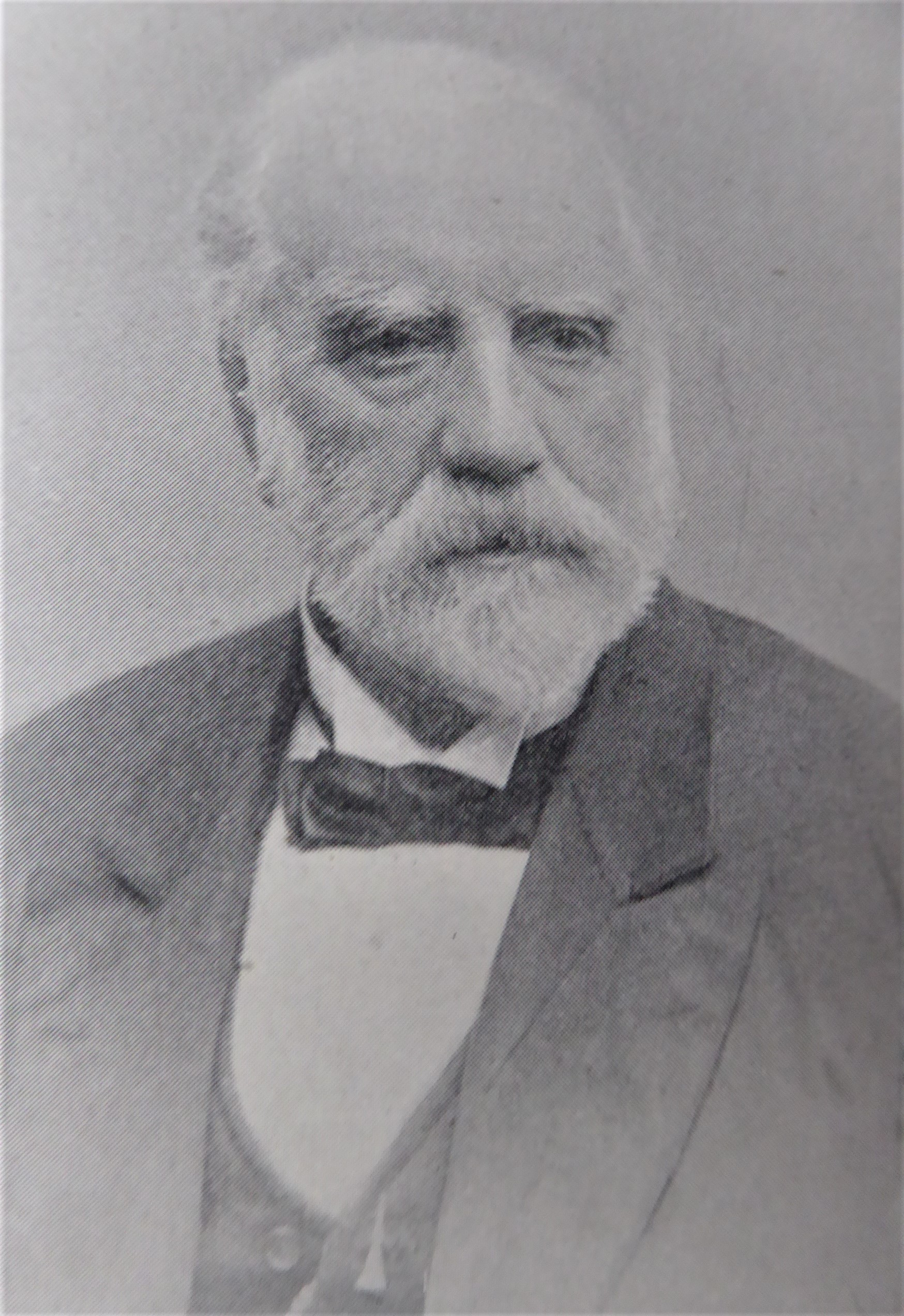
- Ireland in the late 19th century
- Born: 9 May 1810; Edinburgh
- Died: 7 December 1894 (aged 84); Withington, England
- Occupation: Journalist

Alexander Ireland (1810–1894) was a Scottish journalist, man of letters, and bibliophile, notable as a biographer of Ralph Waldo Emerson as well as a friend of Emerson and other literary celebrities, including Leigh Hunt and Thomas Carlyle, and the geologist and scientific speculator Robert Chambers. His own most popular book was The Book-Lover's Enchiridion, published under a pseudonym in 1882.

== Life ==
Ireland was born at Edinburgh on 9 May 1810; his father was a businessman. As a young man he had as friends Robert Chambers, William Chambers and John Gairdner. His friendship with Gairdner led to his acquaintance with Ralph Waldo Emerson, who in 1833 came to Edinburgh: theirs was a lifelong friendship.

In 1843 Ireland moved to Manchester as representative of a Huddersfield firm. In the same year Robert Chambers gave him a confidential task, to have the later highly controversial Vestiges of the Natural History of Creation published anonymously. The secret was well kept until 1884, when everyone else involved in it was dead, and Ireland revealed it in a preface to the twelfth edition.

In 1846 Ireland succeeded Edward Watkin as publisher and business manager of the Manchester Examiner, a paper founded the year before by Watkin, John Bright, and William McKerrow to compete with the Manchester Guardian, on behalf of the Anti-Cornlaw League. The first editor was Thomas Ballantyne. Soon the Examiner absorbed the Manchester Times of Archibald Prentice, and as the Manchester Examiner and Times lasted for 40 years.

In 1847 and 1848 Emerson made his second visit to England, encouraged by Ireland, who made the arrangements for Emerson's lectures. On Emerson's recommendation, Ireland took on the poet Henry Septimus Sutton for the Examiner in 1849. In 1851 Ireland was a member of the committee that organised the Manchester Free Library, where many books of his own later went. He cultivated the friendship of Thomas Carlyle and Leigh Hunt.

Eventually Liberal support swung from the Examiner to the Guardian when the latter's editorial line came down in favour of William Ewart Gladstone's Irish Home Rule proposals in 1886. The Examiner became unprofitable, passed into other hands, and was closed down. Ireland remained active as a writer in the press. He died on 7 December 1894 at Mauldeth Road, Withington.

A medallion portrait was engraved for Threads from the Life of John Mills (1899). A collection of Ireland's books was presented in 1895 to the Manchester Free Reference Library by Thomas Read Wilkinson, and a catalogue was issued in 1898. Ireland had possessed a fine library, rich in editions of the Anatomy of Melancholy; but much of it had had to be sold.

== Works ==
Ireland prepared a bibliography of Leigh Hunt's writings, with a similar list of William Hazlitt's, and printed in a limited edition in 1868. In 1889 he edited a selection from Hazlitt's works, prefaced by a memoir. On Emerson's death in 1882 he published a biography of him, with his own recollections; it was enlarged and reissued within a year as Ralph Waldo Emerson: His Life, Genius, and Writings. In the same year he published at Manchester Recollections of George Dawson and His Lectures in Manchester in 1846-7. A well-known publication was The Book-Lover's Enchiridion, a collection of passages in praise of books selected from a wide range of authors. It was published in 1882 under the pseudonym of "Philobiblos", and went through five editions.

== Family ==
Ireland was twice married: first, in 1839, to Eliza Mary, daughter of Frederick Blyth of Birmingham, who died in 1842. Annie Elizabeth Nicholson, Ireland's second wife, whom he married in 1866, was the sister of Henry Alleyne Nicholson. She was the biographer of Jane Welsh Carlyle (1891), and the editor of her correspondence with Geraldine Jewsbury (1892); her recollections of James Anthony Froude were published posthumously in the Contemporary Review. She died on 4 October 1893. Alexander and Annie Ireland had five children, the youngest being John Nicholson Ireland the composer. Another son was W. Alleyne Ireland.

== Notes ==
Attribution

This article incorporates text from a publication now in the public domain: Lee, Sidney, ed. (1901). "Ireland, Alexander". Dictionary of National Biography (1st supplement). London: Smith, Elder & Co.
