= James Bardsley (priest) =

English cleric (1805–1886)

James Bardsley (1805–1886) was an English cleric of evangelical views.

== Early life ==
He was an older brother of Joseph Bardsley (1825–1896), who became Archdeacon of Craven. As a boy, he worked in Waterhead Mills, Oldham, Lancashire.

After tuition by the Rev. Thomas Rogers at Wakefield Grammar School, Bardsley was a pupil of John Barber at Wilsden, and like Barber was a temperance activist. In the politics of reform, he was a supporter of the 1832 Bill. John Wareing Bardsley, his son, wrote in 1901 of his parents as "holding firmly to the old Evangelical school with a tendency to Puritan asceticism". He was also an associate of George Stringer Bull. Under Bull's influence, he took part in the Ten Hours Bill agitation and factory movement, with Richard Oastler.

== Anglican priest in Yorkshire ==
Bardsley was ordained deacon in 1833, by Edward Venables-Vernon-Harcourt, the Archbishop of York. Patrick Brontë hoped in 1833 to have him as curate assisting at Haworth, but the Archbishop's permission was refused. Records show another candidate, John Butterfield, ordained deacon at the same time, who nominally was to be the assistant. Green conjectures, in any case, that the issue for Harcourt may have been financial: whether Brontë could fund the post. Brontë had a curate from the end of 1835. Bardsley became a family friend, regularly bringing his wife Sarah to Haworth Parsonage for tea on Saturday afternoons.

Bardsley instead became a curate in Keighley. He was living at Bank Place in 1834, in which year he was ordained priest by the Archbishop. The rector of Keighley, from 1825 to 1840, was Theodore Dury (1788–1850). Dury and Bardsley came to Haworth to address a temperance meeting in 1834, at Brontë's invitation. In 1835 Bardsley spoke at the Temperance Festival in Wilsden.

Later in the 1830s Bardsley became curate at Bierley Chapel, then just outside Bradford. There he was from 1837 assistant to George Stringer Bull, and had the whole chapel salary; Bull may have relied on support from John Wood. Caught up in a ramifying dispute involving William Scoresby, the vicar of Bradford, Bardsley resigned. He had had expectations of Bull's position at St James's, the new church built by Wood; but Scoresby's efforts to keep Bradford's churches financed by a 50% levy on surplice fees saw Bull and Bardsley leave the area, while Wood closed St James's.

== Burnley and Manchester ==
In the 1840s Bardsley was a curate for nine years in Burnley, where he had moved around 1840. The incumbent of Burnley, then a chapelry, was a perpetual curate, Robert Mosley Master. In 1841 Bardsley was one of the group of northern clerics agitating for factory reform, that included John Compton Boddington at Horton cum Bradford, William Morgan (1782–1858) in Bradford, and William Margetson Heald the younger at Birstall.

Bardsley was appointed to St Philip's Church, Bradford Road, Manchester in 1849. This was a new church, two or three years old, by Edwin Hugh Shellard, in a densely populated area. He joined Hugh Stowell and Henry Walter McGrath in the Manchester area anti-Catholic campaigns of the 1850s.

== St Ann's Church, Manchester ==
In 1857, Bardsley was appointed rector of St Ann's Church, Manchester. In 1861, he spoke to the Church Pastoral Aid Society and said "The Voluntary system is the life's blood of the Church of England." That year, an address of William McKerrow of the Presbyterian Church of England, on behalf of the Liberation Society, drew from him a rebuttal for the Manchester Church Defence Association. McKerrow supported voluntaryism, as a principle of education of religion; while Bardsley emphasised voluntary contributions to support evangelical causes they both valued, as common endeavour. In 1868 he lectured in his church on the "present crisis", wrote an open letter to the Manchester Courier, and wrote to Gathorne Hardy, lobbying for more evangelical appointments. Hardy forwarded the letter to Benjamin Disraeli, the Prime Minister, who wrote back to Hardy, assuring him that the Oxford University parliamentary seat was of greater concern to him.

Bardley was made an honorary canon of Manchester Cathedral in 1871 by James Fraser. He retired from St Ann's in 1880. He died on 21 May 1886, in Southport.

== Works ==
- Introduction of Christianity into Britain in Apostolic Times, with a brief history of the early English Church (1849)
- The "Liberation Society" and its Abettors (1861), against William McKerrow
- Mind Your Rubrics (1866), against ritualism

He also wrote tracts Popery a Novelty and Rome the Mystic Babylon of the Apocalypse.

== Family ==
Bardsley married Sarah Wareing, daughter of John Wareing of Oldham. They had seven sons, including:

- John Wareing Bardsley, the eldest son, was born in Bierley in 1835.
- James War(e)ing Bardsley, second son, B.A. Trinity College Dublin, 1860.
- Joseph Wareing Bardsley, third son; went to Karachi for the Church Missionary Society.
- George Wareing Bardsley, fourth son
- Richard Wareing Bardsley, fifth son
- Charles Wareing Endell Bardsley (1843/4–1898) was the sixth son, born in Burnley
