= Paul N. Hasluck =

Australian editor and writer

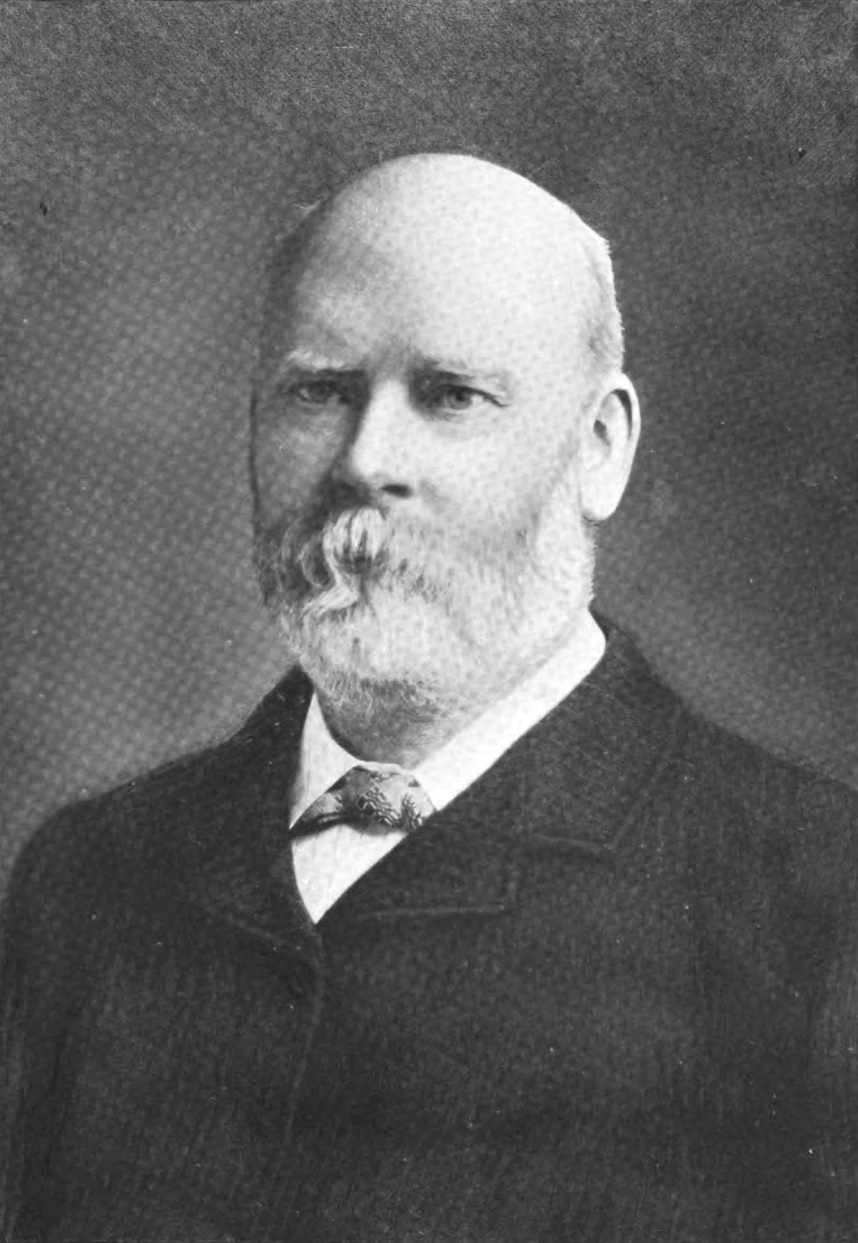
- Born: Paul Nooncree Hasluck; April 1854; South Australia
- Died: 7 May 1931 (aged 77)
- Occupation: Editor • writer
- Spouse: Florence Sparrow (m. 1883; died 1916)
- Children: 2 sons

Paul Nooncree Hasluck (April 1854 – 7 May 1931) was an Anglo-Australian writer and editor. He was born in Australia in April 1854 but moved to the UK before 1881, and lived there till his death in London on 7 May 1931. He wrote about technical subjects and was a pioneer in the "do-it-yourself" category.

Hasluck was the editor of Work (1892–1909) and Building World, (1895–1909), as well as being secretary of the Institution of Sanitary Engineers and a fellow of the Institute of Journalists.

== Family ==
Hasluck married in 1883 Florence née Sparrow, who died in 1916. By her he had two sons. At some point prior to the publication in 1881 of Lathe-work: A Practical Treatise on the Tools, Appliances, and Processes Employed in the Art of Turning he moved to England, where at the time of his death, he maintained two residences: at 97 Loughborough Park, Brixton, and at Coopers Hill, Herne Bay.

== Works authored ==
- Microscopes and Accessories, How To Make and Use Them, published by Cassell and Company as part of "Work Handbooks" series, Preface dated 1905
- Rustic Carpentry
- The Metal Turner's Handybook
- Electric Bells: How To Make And Fit Them
- Lathe-work
- Practical Gas Fitting
- Mounting and Framing Pictures
- Practical Draughtsmen's Work
- Road and Footpath Construction
- Bookbinding
- Motor Bicycle Building
- Leather Working
- Practical Graining and Marbling
- The Wood Turner's Handybook
- Cabinetwork and Joinery
- Iron, Steel, and Fireproof Construction
- Practical Plumbers' Work
- Violins and Other Stringed Instruments - How To Make Them
- Basket Work of All Kinds
- Tinplate Work
- Upholstery
- Textile Fabrics and Their Preparation for Dyeing
- Taxidermy
- Bamboo Work
- The Mechanic's Workshop Handybook
- Painters' Oils, Colours and Varnishes
- Saddlery
- Hasluck, Paul Nooncree (1907). Knotting and splicing ropes and cordage. Philadelphia: David McKay. OL 6954703M.
- Practical Staircase Joinery
- The Automobile: A Practical Treatise
- The Model Engineer's Handybook
- House Decoration
- Dynamos and Electric Motors
- Wood Finishing: Comprising Staining, Varnishing and Polishing
- The Clock Jobber's Handybook
- Colouring Matters for Dyeing Textiles
- Hands, Arthur (1905). Hasluck, Paul Nooncree (ed.). The Book of Photography; practical, theoretical and applied. London, New York: Cassell and Co. OCLC 297641508.
- Cycle Building and Repairing
- The Pattern Maker's Handybook
- Smith's work
- Sanitary Construction in Building
- Electro-plating
- Harness Making
- Beehives and Beekeepers' Appliances
- Lens Grinding & Mirrors for Astronomical Telescopes

== Works edited ==
- Photographic Chemistry
- Manual of Traditional Wood Carving
- Cassell's Cyclopedia of Mechanics
- Cassell's Carpentry and Joinery
- The Handyman's Book of Tools, Materials, and Processes Employed in Carpentry, Joinery, and Cabinet Work
