= Baldrey =

Baldrey may refer to:

- Long John Baldrey (1941–2005), English-Canadian blues singer and voice actor
- Joshua Baldrey (1754–1828), engraver and draftsman
