= Thomas Ballantyne =

Thomas Ballantyne may refer to:

- Thomas Ballantyne (politician) (1829–1908), Canadian politician
- Thomas Ballantyne (journalist) (1806–1871), Scottish journalist

== See also ==
- Thomas Ballantyne Martin (1901–1995), British politician, stockbroker and journalist
- Thomas A. Ballantine Jr. (1926–1992), U.S. federal judge
