= 1890 New Year Honours =

Appointments by Queen Victoria to various orders and honours

The 1890 New Year Honours were appointments by Queen Victoria to various orders and honours of the United Kingdom and British India.

They were announced in The Times on 1 January 1890, and the various honours were gazetted in The London Gazette on 1 January 1890 and on 7 January 1890.

The recipients of honours are displayed or referred to as they were styled before their new honour and arranged by honour and where appropriate by rank (Knight Grand Cross, Knight Commander etc.) then division (Military, Civil).

== Privy Council ==
- Sir John Lubbock, Bart., MP
- Sir John Gorst, QC, MP

== Baronet ==
- J. T. Dillwyn-Llewelyn, of Penllergare
- James Thompson Mackenzie, Esq., of Glen Muick
- William Scovell Savory, Esq., President of the Royal College of Surgeons

== Knight Bachelor ==
- Raylton Dixon, Esq., late Mayor of Middlesbrough
- Robert P. Harding, Esq., Chief Official Receiver in Bankruptcy
- Thomas Sowler, Esq., of Manchester
- Honourable Romesh Chunder Mitter, Judge of the High Court, Calcutta
- Tharia Topan, Esq., head of the British Indian community and founder of the hospital at Zanzibar
- Joseph Hickson, Esq., of Montreal
- Honourable Matthew Henry Davies, Speaker of the Legislative Assembly of Victoria

== The Most Honourable Order of the Bath ==
=== Knights Commander of the Order of the Bath (KCB) ===
Military division

- Lieutenant-General George Tomkyns Chesney, CB, CSI, CIE, RE, Member of the Council of the Viceroy and Governor-General of India.

Civil division

- The Honourable Charles William Fremantle, CB, Deputy Master and Comptroller of the Royal Mint
- Charles Lennox Peel, Esq., CB, Clerk of the Privy Council

=== Companions of the Order of the Bath (CB) ===
Civil division

- Sir Oscar Moore Passey Clayton, Knt., CMG, FRCS
- John Henry Daniell, Esq., Agent to the National Debt Commissioners
- Ralph Daniel Makinson Littler, Esq., QC
- William Smiles, Esq., Chief Inspector of Taxes, Inland Revenue Office

== Order of the Star of India ==
=== Companion of the Order of the Star of India (CSI) ===
- William Mackworth Young, Esq., Bengal Civil Service, Second Financial Commissioner in the Punjab.
- Colonel George Edward Langham Somerset Sanford, CB, RE, Inspector-General of Military Works, India.
- Lieutenant-Colonel Robert Warburton, Bengal Staff Corps, Political Officer in the Khyber.

== Order of Saint Michael and Saint George ==
=== Knight Grand Cross of the Order of St Michael and St George (GCMG) ===
- The Right Honourable the Earl of Belmore, KCMG, formerly Governor and Commander-in-Chief of the Colony of New South Wales.

=== Knight Commander of the Order of St Michael and St George (KCMG) ===
- Celicourt Auguste Antelme, Esq., CMG, Member of the Executive Council and Senior Elected Member of the Council of Government of the Colony of Mauritius.
- Montagu Frederick Ommanney, Esq., CMG, one of the Crown Agents for the Colonies.
- Cornelius Alfred Moloney, Esq., CMG, Governor and Commander-in-Chief of the Colony of Lagos.
- John Cox Bray, Esq., Speaker of the House of Assembly of the Colony of South Australia.
- Jacobus Albertus de Wet, Esq., Secretary for Native Affairs of the Colony of the Cape of Good Hope.

=== Companion of the Order of St Michael and St George (CMG) ===
- Gilbert Thomas Carter, Esq., Administrator of the Colony of the Gambia.
- Peter Leys, Esq., lately administering the Government of the Colony of Labuan.
- Thomas Elliott, Esq., Auditor-General of the Colony of Mauritius.
- John George Bourinot, Esq., MA, LL.D., Clerk of the House of Commons of the Dominion of Canada.
- Robert Burdett Smith, Esq., Member of the Legislative Assembly of the Colony of New South Wales, and Executive Commissioner for that Colony at the Melbourne Centennial Exhibition, 1888–89.
- Charles Washington Eves, Esq., for services rendered in connection with the Island of Jamaica.
- Thomas Irvine Rowell, Esq., Principal Civil Medical Officer of the Straits Settlements.
- Colonel Frederick Gatt, Second-in-Command of the Royal Malta Artillery.
- Lieutenant-Colonel Edward Bowater McInnis, Inspector-General of Constabulary of the Gold Coast Colony
- George Brackenbury, Esq., late Her Majesty's Consul at Lisbon.
- Oswald John Frederick Crawfurd, Esq., Her Majesty's Consul at Porto.
- Alfred Caillard, Esq., Director-General of Egyptian Customs.

== Order of the Indian Empire ==
=== Knight Commander of the Order of the Indian Empire (KCIE) ===
- Sir Roper Lethbridge, CIE, late Press Commissioner in India.
- Major-General Sir George Stewart White, VC, KCB.

=== Companion of the Order of the Indian Empire (CIE) ===
- Sardar Bhagat Singh, Member of the Kapurthala State Council.
- Colonel William Merriman, RE, First Grade Executive Engineer, Bombay.
- Lieutenant-Colonel William Percival Tomkins, RE, Superintending Engineer and Secretary to the Agent to the Governor-General in Beluchistan.
- Colonel William Arthur James Wallace, RE, Director of the North-Western Railway, India.
- Henry Bidewell Grigg, Esq., Madras Civil Service, Director of Public Instruction, Madras.
- Berthold Ribbentrop, Esq., Inspector of Forests.
- Brigade Surgeon George King, MB, Bengal Medical Service, Superintendent of the Royal Botanical Gardens, Calcutta.
- Langton Prendergast Walsh, Esq., Assistant Resident at Zeyla.
- Henry Paul Todd-Naylor, Esq., Bengal Civil Service, Officiating Deputy Commissioner of Magwe, Upper Burma.
