= Henry Septimus Sutton =

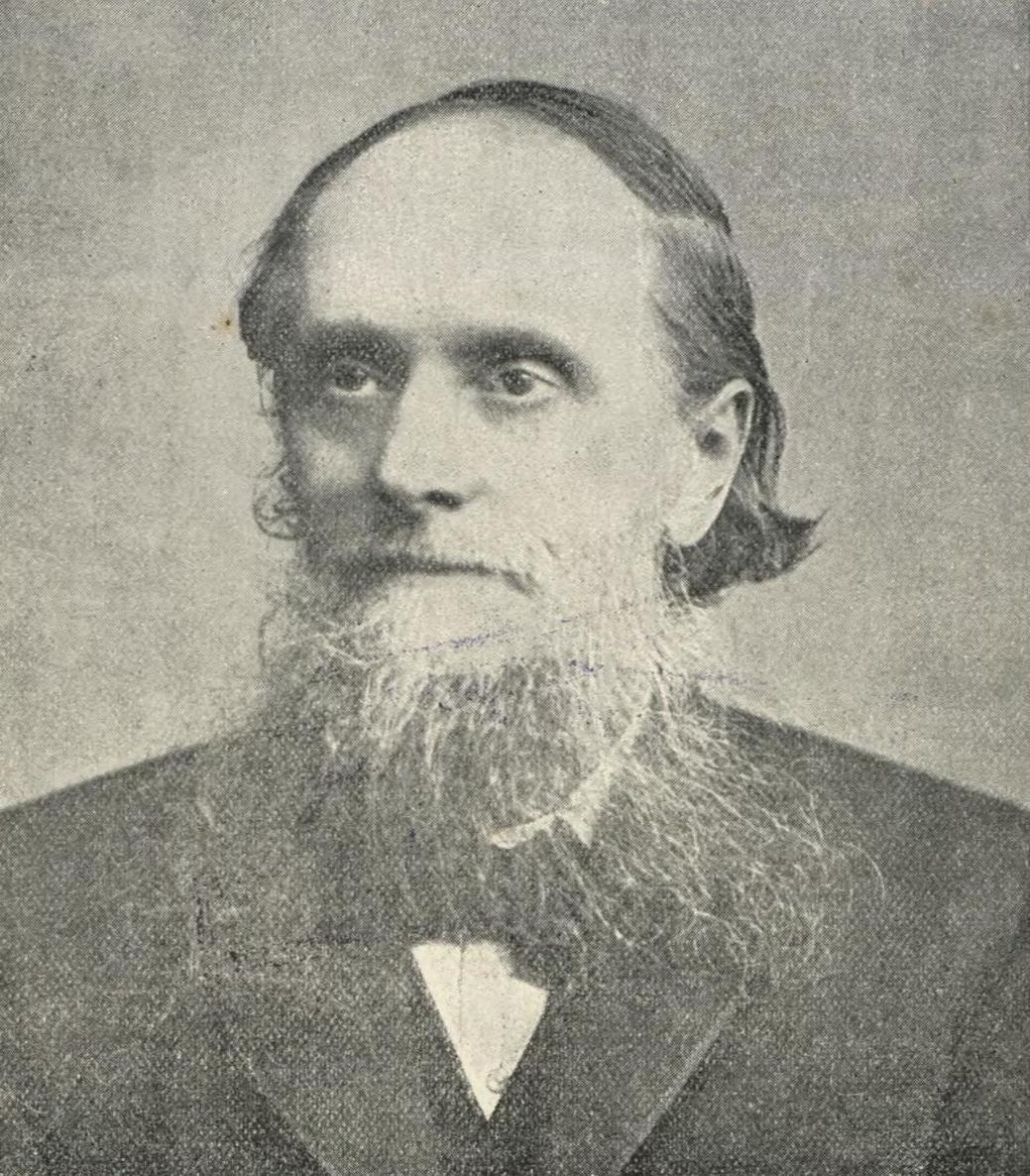
- Sutton c. 1880
- Born: 10 February 1825; Nottingham, England
- Died: 2 May 1901 (aged 76); Moss Side, Manchester, England
- Occupations: Journalist, activist, poet
- Spouses: Sarah Prickard (m. 1850; died 1868) Mary Sophia Ewen (m. 1870)
- Children: 2

Henry Septimus Sutton (10 February 1825 – 2 May 1901) was an English journalist and temperance activist, known as a religious poet.

== Life ==
Sutton was born in Nottingham on 10 February 1825. He was the seventh child in a family of seven sons and three daughters of Richard Sutton (1789–1856) of Nottingham, bookseller, printer and proprietor of the Nottingham Review, by his wife Sarah, daughter of Thomas Salt, farmer, of Stanton by Dale, Derbyshire. His sister, as Eliza S. Oldham, was known as an author.

Sutton was educated at a private school in Nottingham and at Leicester Grammar School. A vegetarian and total abstainer, he developed a strong vein of mysticism with an active interest in social and religious problems. He became an expert shorthand writer. For a short period he took a position as a journalist in Colchester. In 1849, on Ralph Waldo Emerson's recommendation, Alexander Ireland found Sutton employment as a journalist in Manchester, and in 1853 he became chief of the Manchester Examiner and Times reporting staff.

Sutton joined the United Kingdom Alliance on its foundation at Manchester in 1853, and was editor of its weekly journal, the Alliance News, from its start in 1854 until 1898, contributing leading articles till his death. He was also editor from 1859 to 1869 of Meliora, a quarterly journal devoted to social and temperance reform. In 1857 he joined the Peter Street Society of Swedenborgians. He took part in Swedenborgian church and Sunday school work, and was popular as a lay preacher.

Sutton died at 18 Yarburgh Street, Moss Side, Manchester, on 2 May 1901, and was buried at Worsley.

== Associations ==
Among Sutton's early literary friends were his fellow townsman, Philip James Bailey, and Coventry Patmore. He became close to Patmore from about 1844, and they kept up a long correspondence on literary and religious subjects. In Manchester he met George MacDonald, and they too became lifelong friends. When Ralph Waldo Emerson visited Manchester in 1847 he invited Sutton from Nottingham to meet him, and a permanent friendship was begun. Emerson visited Sutton at Nottingham next year; they met again in Manchester in 1872. Another correspondent was William Allingham.

== Works ==
Sutton's early influence was Emerson: his first book, in prose, The Evangel of Love (1847), closely followed Emerson's thought. In 1848 his first poetical work, the tiny and mystical Clifton Grove Garland, came out at Nottingham. In 1854 there appeared his Quinquenergia; or, Proposals for a New Practical Theology, including a poem series Rose's Diary which made his reputation. It was praised by Bronson Alcott and James Martineau, and anthologised in the Golden Treasury of Sacred Poetry by Francis Palgrave. Thomas Carlyle, however, found Sutton pretentious.

In a collected edition of his poems (1886) Sutton added, among other new poems, A Preacher's Soliloquy and Sermon. Rose's Diary with other poems was reprinted in the "Broadbent" booklets as A Sutton Treasury (Manchester, 1899; seventeenth thousand, 1909).

Sutton expounded Emanuel Swedenborg's writings along his own lines in:

- Outlines of the Doctrine of the Mind according to Emanuel Swedenborg, with observations (1889),
- Five Essays for Students of the Divine Philosophy of Swedenborg (1895), with a sixth essay Our Saviour's Triple Crown (1898), and
- a seventh essay The Golden Age: pt. i. Man's Creation and Fall; pt. ii. Swedenborgian Phrenology (Manchester, 1900).

== Family ==
Sutton was twice married:

1. in January 1850 to Sarah Prickard (d. June 1868), by whom he had a son, Arthur James, a scholar at Balliol College, Oxford, who predeceased him in 1880, and a daughter who survived him;
2. in May 1870 to Mary Sophia Ewen, who survived him without issue till April 1910.

== Notes ==
Attribution

This article incorporates text from a publication now in the public domain: Lee, Sidney, ed. (1912). "Sutton, Henry Septimus". Dictionary of National Biography (2nd supplement). Vol. 3. London: Smith, Elder & Co.
