= Thomas Christian Tychsen =

German theologian (1758–1834)

Thomas Christian Tychsen (8 May 1758, Horsbüll – 23 October 1834, Göttingen) was a German theologian.

He was born in the town of Horsbøl (Horsbüll), German) in the Danish Crown Duchy of Slesvig (Danish: Hertugdømmet Slesvig; German: Herzogtum Schleswig; Low German: Hartogdom Sleswig; North Frisian: Härtochduum Slaswik) Duchy of Schleswig. He was an orientalist and Lutheran theologian who studied at institutions located in diverse regions including the Electorate of Hanover (now Germany). He is known for his 1823 grammar of the Arabic language.

He studied theology and philology in Kiel and Göttingen, followed by an educational tour through Europe; France, Spain and Lombardy, completed with a lengthy stay in Vienna. In 1788, he became a full professor of theology at the University of Göttingen. He was a full member of the Göttingen Academy of Sciences and was associated with several foreign scientific societies.

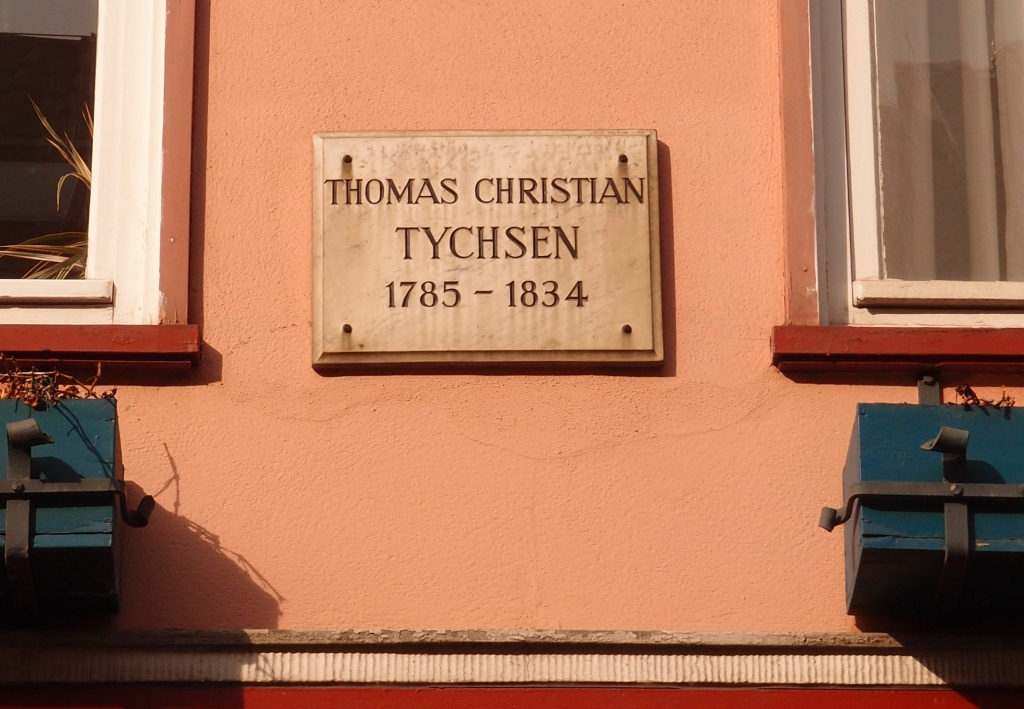
Memorial plaque to Tychsen in Göttingen, Gotmarstraße 3

He was the author of a book on Arabic grammar, Grammatik der arabischen Schriftsprache (1823), and edited works of the Greek poet Quintus Smyrnaeus. Among his better known students were Orientalists Wilhelm Gesenius (1786-1842) and Heinrich Ewald (1803-1875).

According to "Persons of Indian Studies" by Prof. Karttunen, he was a "German Greek and Oriental Scholar and a Numismatician. Professor in Göttingen. Son of a minister, taught by father and at Husum Gymnasium. From 1777 studies of theology, classics and Oriental languages at Kiel, from 1779 languages at Göttingen under Heyne and Michaëlis. During the lectures of Heyne he befriended with Heeren and Fr. Müller. Graduated 1783. In 1783-84 travelled with Professor Moldenhauer of Copenhagen, on a scholarship from the King of Denmark, in France, Spain, North Italy and Austria. From 1785 taught at Göttingen, first as ao. Professor of Theology, from 1788 until his death ord. Professor of Philosophy. From 1789 member of Göttingen Ges. d. Wiss., 1806 Hofrath, 1815 Dannebrog knight, 1817 hon. Dr.theol. Married in the early 1790s, 3 children."

== Sources ==
- Grammatik Der Arabischen Schriftsprache Für Den Ersten Unterricht: Mit Einigen Auszügen Aus Dem Koran, 1923
