= John Henry Nicholson =

Australian writer

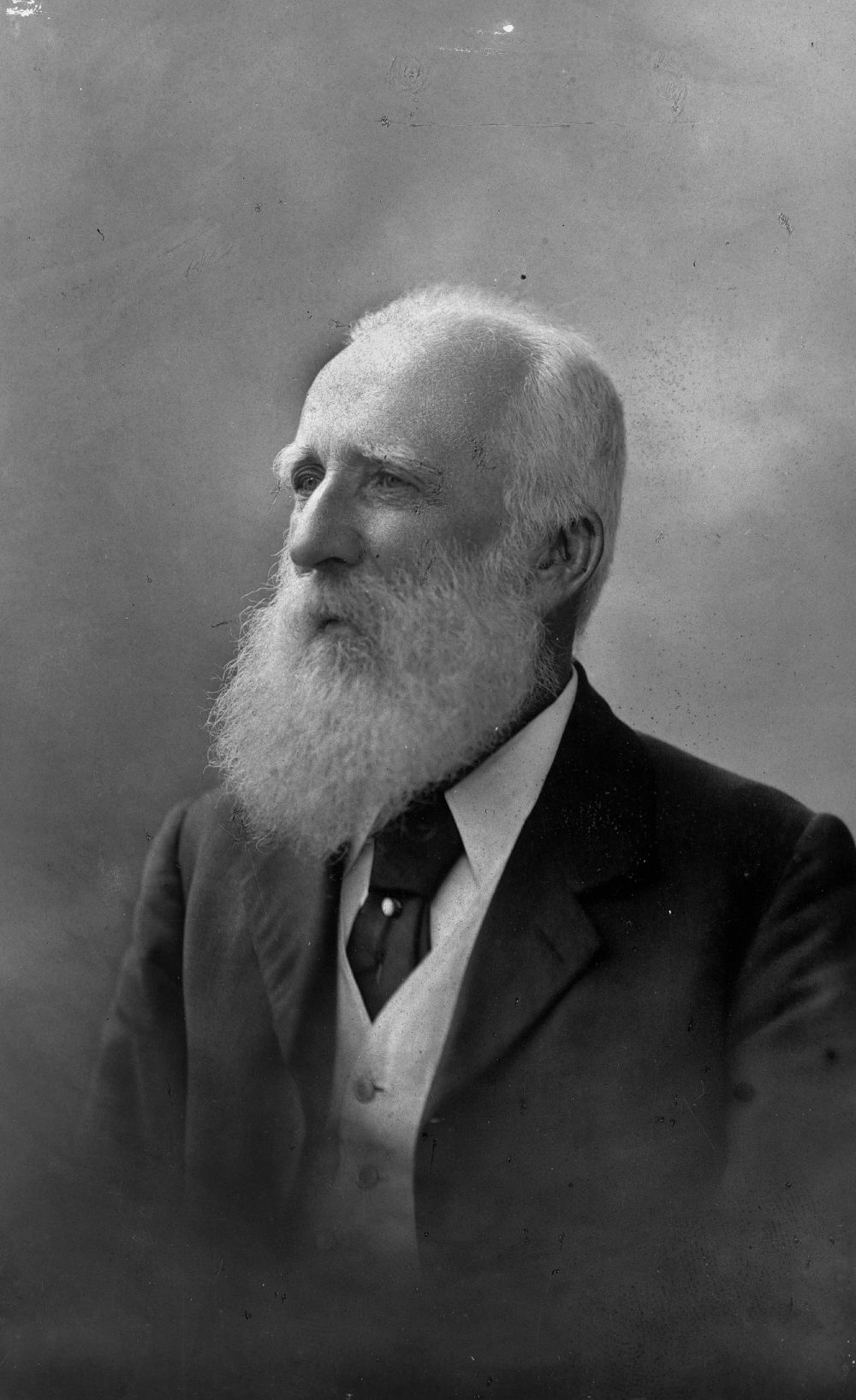
John Henry Nicholson, John Oxley Library, State Library of Queensland. Neg 195834

John Henry Nicholson (1838–1923) was a British-born, Queensland man of letters, teacher, writer and poet.

== Life ==
John Henry Nicholson was born into a distinguished family of literary and scientific note, at Lyme Regis, Dorset, England on 12 June 1838. He was the eldest son of Anne Elizabeth Waring and John Nicholson (1809–1886). His mother Anne was the daughter of Captain Henry Waring, R.N. of Lyme Regis, Dorset. Her brother, Nicholson's uncle, John Burley Waring, was an architect, painter and intellectual. Nicholson's father was a distinguished biblical scholar and orientalist, who had studied at Oxford and in Germany, and in 1836 had published a grammar of the Hebrew language of the Old Testament. Nicholson's grandfather was the Rev Mark Nicholson (1770–1838), Fellow of Queen's College Oxford and long term President of Codrington College, Barbados. John Nicholson and his brother, Dr William Alleyne Nicholson, had befriended Ludwig Leichhardt, who they had met at the University of Göttingen. This connection ultimately led to the Nicholson family sponsoring Leichhardt's journey to Australia, by giving him £200, making his journeys of exploration possible. One of Nicholson's younger brothers was the famous palaeontologist, Henry Alleyne Nicholson (1844–1889) who became the Regius Professor of Natural History at Aberdeen University, and also held chairs in the main universities of Canada, Ireland and England. A sister, Annie Elizabeth Nicholson, was the biographer of Jane Welsh Carlyle.

Nicholson said of himself that he had inherited his taste for linguistic studies from his father, his love for art and propensity to mysticism from his uncle, and he shared with his brother his proclivities for chemistry and botany and other real sciences and literary inclinations with the whole family.

Nicholson was educated privately and also attended the Croft House Academy for boys, Brampton, Cumberland, where he developed an abiding love of German under the tutelage of the distinguished writer, Eugen Oswald. He emigrated to New South Wales in 1854 at the age of 16. Among the occupations he tried were whaling and gold prospecting.

After a brief trip to England in 1859, Nicholson returned to the newly-independent state of Queensland at the end of that year, and married German-born Anna Wagner, the following year. His teaching experience included the German Mission National Day School, Nundah, which changed its name to Nundah State School in 1895 (1865–1868), Springsure (1870–1876), Enoggera National School (1877–1885) and Cambooya (1893–1894).

Between 1867 and in 1878, Nicholson published three short books. The first two of these were published under the pseudonyms of 'Tadberry Gilcobs' and 'Salathiel Doles'.

Inspired in part by John Bunyan's Pilgrim's Progress, ('Halek' being the Herbrew word for 'pilgrim'), The Adventures of Halek was published in London in 1882, and was considered by some to be a masterpiece, "worthy to rank with the works of Dean, Swift and John Bunyan as classics". Others, like the reviewer in The Bulletin, were not so kind, writing that Halek had "one crowning fault - it is insufferably tedious", a sentiment shared by A.G. Stephens who pronounced the book "carefully written, but dull". Largely autobiographical, the work is essentially an allegory which communicates the idea of man's development from sinful worldliness to ideal goodness. A second self-published edition of Halek was produced in 1896 in Brisbane, incorporating a review of Halek by Theodore Wood, explanatory notes, a key to the Hebrew words, together with congratulatory letters from admirers like W E Gladstone, Sir Samuel Griffith, the Rev William Osborne Lilley, Denis O'Donovan (the Queensland Parliamentary Librarian), and others. A third edition appeared in 1904. In the same year Almoni, a companion volume to Halek, was also published in Brisbane, but received a less positive reception. Both books were translated into several European languages.

Nicholson was one of the founding members of the Johnsonian Club (1878–1991), an exclusive Brisbane club, modelled on the London Literary Club of Sir Joshua Reynolds and Samuel Johnson. Established on the notion of 'friendly association and the study of current literature', other founding members included published authors, journalists, educators and pressmen, including James Brunton Stephens, Horace Earle, William Senior, John Warde, and Gresley Lukin. Like the original Literary club, the Brisbane club defined itself by gender, profession, class and a belief in the elevating effects of cultural, and in particular literary, exchange. Although there was a spate of replicas of the original literary club formed all around the world in the United Kingdom, the United States, Canada, Sweden and Japan, the Brisbane club was the first.

In 1905, four years after the death of his first wife, Anna Cordes married him. He died at Brisbane on 30 June 1923 at the age of 85, and was buried with his first wife, Anna Wagner, in the Nundah cemetery.

Anna Cordes survived Nicholson, later marrying the amateur astronomer, Dudley Eglinton F.R.A.S. There were no children from either marriage, but Nicholson and his first wife had adopted a daughter, Janey (Jane Wagner Nicholson), who became a teacher of German in Queensland schools, and who died 24 November 1934.

In 1986, students of the Nundah State School raised money for a plaque to be placed on Nicholson's grave, honouring his status as the first head teacher at the school. At its unveiling, his patriotic song 'Rouse Australians' written in 1889 was performed. Beside his headstone there rests a smaller stone inscribed simply with the word 'Halek' in Gothic letters.

== Legacy ==
Nicholson, along with friends George Essex Evans and James Brunton Stephens, was the recipient of a Commonwealth Literary Fund pension from 1908. The fund was designed to support recognised authors who, by reason of age or infirmity were unable to support themselves, or if having died impoverished, to support their widows and families.

The State Library of Queensland holds Nicholson's papers, as well as his books, unpublished manuscripts and collections of poetry.

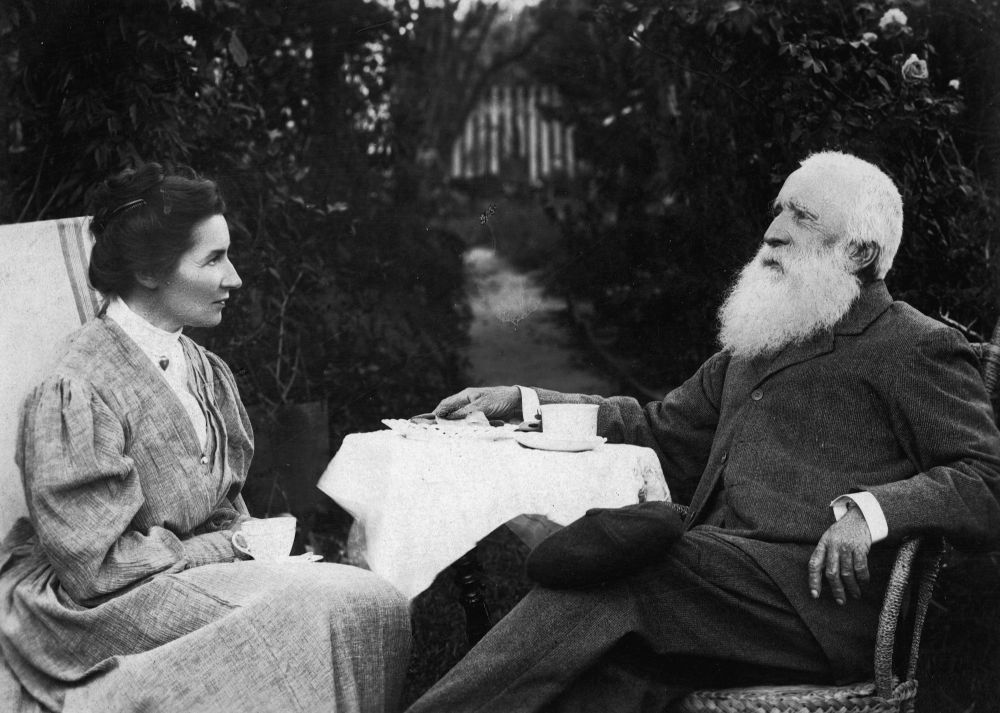
J. H Nicholson and wife, Anna Cordes, Brisbane, c 1905

== List of works ==
- The mysterious cooks: a tale of Australia; to which is added Christmas in Queensland by Tadberry Gilcobs. Manchester: A. Ireland, 1867
- My little book / by Salathiel Doles [pseud.]; to which is added Pewbungle's log. Toronto: Adam, Stevenson & Co., 1873.
- The opal fever, or, Wild life in Queensland [by] Salathiel Doles [pseud.] Brisbane: F.T.F. Keogh, 1878 (also titled Bunkum in Parvo)
- Hubert and other poems: together with a metrical translation of Schiller's 'Lied von der Glocke'. Brisbane: F.T.F. Keogh, 1879
- The adventures of Halek: an autobiographical fragment. London: Griffith and Farron, 1882
- Moike, or, Melbourne in muddle: a farcical comedy in two acts. Brisbane: A. Cleghorn, 1886
- The Spanish coachman: a play / by John H. Nicholson Brisbane: A. Cleghorn, 1887
- Recreation of Toil, 1889
- Halek: a romance (2nd edition). Brisbane: printed for the author by A.J. Ross, 1896.
- Almoni. Brisbane: Edwards, Dunlop, 1904
- Halek: a romance (3rd ed), Brisbane: Edwards, Dunlop, 1904
- Recreations of a registrar: the grand palindrome. Brisbane: Nichols, Larwill & Butler, 1904
- Ring of Eldad (short story). The Queenslander, 29 October 1904 p44
- Prince Medyan or The Wonderful Coffer (short story) The Queenslander 3 December 1904 p46
- A book of verse. Brisbane: Gordon and Gotch, 1916

=== Music ===
- Sunrise / words and melody by J. H. Nicholson; pianoforte accompaniment by Lena Hammond. Brisbane: s.n. 19?
- Rouse Australians: patriotic song. words and music by John H. Nicholson c1898 edited by Seymore Dicker. Brisbane: Pole, Outridge and Co, 19-
- Sons of Britannia: a song of the Empire / words and melody by John H. Nicholson; pianoforte accompaniment by S. G. Benson. W.H. Palings & Co,1898
- Our Austral flag: song and chorus / words and music by John H Nicholson; pianoforte accompaniment and chorus arrangement by V.B. Benvenuti. Brisbane: W. H. Paling & Co., 1901
