= John Nicholson (orientalist) =

English orientalist (1809–1886)

John Nicholson (1809–1886) was an English landowner and orientalist, known for his command of Hebrew and Arabic.

== Life ==
He was the son of the Rev. Mark Nicholson of Barbados, the eldest in a family of six and born there; his mother was Lucy Reynold Ellcock. He matriculated at The Queen's College, Oxford in 1825, at age 16, graduating B.A. in 1830. He then went to the University of Göttingen to study under Heinrich Ewald. Ludwig Leichhardt, a friend there, mentioned that Nicholson left Göttingen around the end of 1833. Nicholson's translation of Ewald's Hebrew Grammar was published by 1835.

In 1838 the Rev. Mark Nicholson died: to this point he had supported John Nicholson and his brother William with generous allowances. William had returned to the family home at Clifton, Bristol, and Leichhardt visited him there. Nicholson entered the University of Tübingen in 1838. He was awarded a doctorate there for a translation from the Arabic.

Nicholson then returned to England, settling at Penrith, Cumberland. He was first at "Inglewood", Townhead, from 1840, moving in 1851 to Fellside. The Maronite scholar Ahmad Faris al-Shidyaq paid an extended visit to him there, in winter 1851–2, examining manuscripts in Arabic. Another visitor, and a long-term correspondent, was Francis William Newman. The Swedenborgian traveller Rudolph Leonhard Tafel encountered there Mark Nicholson, John's youngest brother, in 1857.

In 1854, Nicholson was one of the founders of the Penrith Working Men's Reading Room, with Lord Brougham and William Marshall.

== Works ==
- An Account of the Establishment of the Fatemite Dynasty in Africa (1840), translation from a work attributed to Al-Masudi. Nicholson translated and annotated the work, which he described as a chronicle by ʻArīb ibn Saʻd, a continuator of Al-Tabari.

== Legacy ==
In 1885 Nicholson presented more than one hundred bound volumes to the library of the Royal Asiatic Society, of works in Sanskrit and other languages. A catalogue of his Arabic and Persian manuscripts was made by Reynold A. Nicholson, his grandson. R. A. Nicholson's early inspiration as an orientalist was his grandfather's library; and he inherited a collection of manuscripts from it.

== Family ==
In 1836 Nicholson, then of Clifton, Bristol, married Ann Elizabeth Waring of Lyme Regis, daughter of Henry Waring, a naval captain; she was the sister of Edward John Waring and John Burley Waring. The couple resided in Lyme Regis for a period, during which their first child was born, in 1838. This was John Henry Nicholson.

In all, the couple had 12 children, of whom eight survived to adulthood. John Henry Baptised at Penrith were subsequent children: William Robert (1841); Ann Elizabeth (1842); Henry Allayne (1844); Lucy Waring (1846); Edith Allayne (1849, died shortly); Frances Margaret (1852); Francis Reynold (1853); and Edward Elcock (1854). Frances, the tenth child, a temperance activist and philanthropist, did not marry, dying in 1942 at age 90. She was a Poor Law Guardian, and participated in the Brabazon scheme. For World War I refugee work, she received the Queen Elisabeth Medal.

Ann is now known as the biographer of Jane Carlyle. She was brought up partly with relations in Barbados, and partly in London, and had Russell Martineau as tutor. She married Alexander Ireland in 1865, and was mother of John Ireland the composer. She died in 1893.

Nicholson's brother William moved to Cleveland, Ohio in 1848, and married Elizabeth Wilson of Canandaigua; he died in 1853. Elizabeth, having also lost her two children, then emigrated to the Penrith household. There she helped bring up Frances Margaret.
