= John Nicolson (disambiguation) =

John Nicolson (born 1961) is a Scottish journalist and politician who served as a Member of Parliament from 2015 to 2017, and again from 2019 to date.

John Nicolson may also refer to:

- John Nicolson (artist) (1891–1951), British artist
- John Nicolson (Australian cricketer) (1917–1992), Australian cricketer
- John Nicolson (South African cricketer) (1899–1935), South African cricketer
- John B. Nicolson (1783–1846), American naval officer

== See also ==
- John Nicholson (disambiguation)
