= Manchester Examiner =

The Manchester Examiner was a newspaper based in Manchester, England, that was founded around 1845–1846. Initially intended as an organ to promote the idea of Manchester Liberalism, a decline in its later years led to a takeover by a group who intended to use it to promote Liberal Unionism without actually being directly associated with the Liberal Unionist Party (LUP). That scheme soon failed due to severe financial problems, leading the LUP to take control of the newspaper for a brief period just before the 1892 general election campaign. It was then sold at a significant loss to a competitor, who also owned the Manchester Courier. The last edition was published in 1894 before it was absorbed by the Empire News.

== Manchester Liberalism ==
The Manchester Examiner was established as a rival to the radical Manchester Times, which its proprietors considered not sufficiently representative of their Liberal viewpoints. The initial owners were Thomas Ballantyne, John Bright, Alexander Ireland, William McKerrow and Edward Watkin.

The first edition of the Manchester Examiner was published on 10 January 1846. It absorbed the Manchester Times in 1848 and from June 1855, by now being run by George Wilson, the newspaper was published every morning at a price of one penny. The price was set to undercut rivals such as the Manchester Guardian and did so for some time until the rivals responded. Despite this competitive advantage, and in common with many other local newspapers, its influence in London was low and it suffered from difficulties in distribution. In 1856, Richard Cobden was inspired to become involved in establishing the Morning Star in London as an imitator of the Manchester Examiner that would disseminate the school of Manchester radicalism more widely, but it was of an inferior journalistic standard and had little political impact.

The newspaper reached its point of greatest influence during the editorship of Henry Dunckley but by 1888 it was in severe decline. There had been criticism of Dunckley's habit of leaving work for home while the bulk of the day's news was still arriving at the offices, and also of the editorial wavering over the issue of Home Rule, in contrast to the strong support shown for it by the Manchester Guardian that had caused the latter to surge ahead of its competitor. Around the end of 1888, together with its companion newspaper, the Manchester Weekly Times, the Manchester Examiner was sold to the Manchester Press Company, a business headed by Sir Joseph Lee. (Note: Henry Dunckley left the newspaper at the time of its sale and thereafter contributed to the Manchester Guardian.)

== Liberal Unionism ==
The new owners, who were Liberal Unionists, believed that it could be a serious rival to the Tory-supporting Manchester Courier and the Gladstonian Liberalist Manchester Guardian. Despite originally believing that they could revive and run the newspaper without explicit support from the Liberal Unionist Party, by 1890 they were struggling to sustain the newspaper business for which they had paid around £98,000. Various requests were made to Liberal grandees, such as Lord Derby, in search of further funds but those people were reluctant to throw good money in the direction of what they perceived to be a failing enterprise, even when the expertise of W. H. Smith was called upon to vouch that it could be made viable once more. Nonetheless, and by means that are uncertain, the party did in fact provide money and paid £8900 in the run-up to the 1892 general election to take direct control. An attempt to arrest the decline was made by founding the Manchester Evening Times, which it was hoped would provide support for the morning newspaper in a manner similar to the successful introduction of the Manchester Evening News by the publishers of the Manchester Guardian. The venture proving to be unsuccessful, the evening newspaper was closed after 49 issues. The new owners also reduced the price of the Manchester Examiner to halfpence but that, too, did not resolve the problems. In November 1891, it was sold to a syndicate headed by Thomas Sowler, the owner of the Manchester Courier, for what Lord Wolmer at the time said was a "net sum recovered" of £390. Wolmer, himself a Liberal Unionist, had been a vocal supporter of efforts to keep the newspaper going at least until the election, telling the party's leader, Lord Hartington,

I need not say that if the Examiner failed entirely it would be a great blow to us in the North. I think that at all hazards it must be kept going until after the next General Election.

Publication ceased in 1894 when it was absorbed by the Empire News.

== See also ==
- Abraham Walter Paulton
