= Hearne v Stowell =

1841 English case of libel

Hearne V. Stowell
- Court: Nisi Prius Court, Liverpool
- Decided: 1841

Case history
- Related action: lawsuit

Keywords
- Libel

Hearne v. Stowell was an 1841 court case held in the Nisi Prius Court, Liverpool Assizes pertaining to a case of libel in Manchester, England. The case is a prominent case of an inter-clergy lawsuit and is cited both as an example of anti-Catholic sentiment in the United Kingdom in the mid 19th century and as a sample of libel precedent. Hugh Stowell, an Anglican preacher, alleged that Daniel Hearne, a Catholic priest, had forced a man to crawl down a street for penance. Hearne sued for libel and while the court case was resolved in his favour, it was later reversed by the Queen's Bench.
