= Heinrich Ewald =

German theologian (1803–1875)

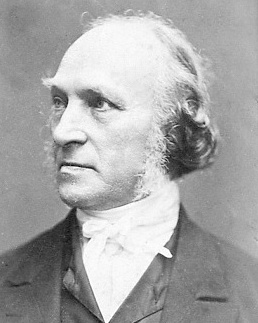
Heinrich Ewald

Georg Heinrich August Ewald (16 November 1803 – 4 May 1875) was a German orientalist, Protestant theologian, and Biblical exegete. He studied at the University of Göttingen. In 1827 he became extraordinary professor there, in 1831 ordinary professor of theology, and in 1835 professor of oriental languages. In 1837, as a member of the Göttingen Seven, he lost his position at Göttingen on account of his protest against King Ernst August's abrogation of the liberal constitution, and became professor of theology at the University of Tübingen. In 1848, he returned to his old position at Göttingen. When Hanover was annexed by Prussia in 1866, Ewald became a defender of the rights of the ex-king. Among his chief works are: Complete Course on the Hebrew Language (German: Ausführliches Lehrbuch der hebräischen Sprache), The Poetical Books of the Old Testament (German: Die poetischen Bücher des alten Bundes), History of the People of Israel (German: Geschichte des Volkes Israel), and Antiquities of the People of Israel (German: Die Altertümer des Volkes Israel). Ewald represented the city of Hanover as a member of the Guelph faction in the North German and German Diets.

== Life ==
Ewald was born in Göttingen where his father was a linen weaver. In 1815 he was sent to the gymnasium, and in 1820 he entered the University of Göttingen, where he studied with J. G. Eichhorn and T. C. Tychsen, specialising in oriental languages. At the close of his academic studies in 1823 he was appointed to a mastership in the gymnasium at Wolfenbüttel, and made a study of the oriental manuscripts in the Wolfenbüttel library. But in the spring of 1824 he was recalled to Göttingen as theological tutor (German: Repetent), and in 1827 (the year of Eichhorn's death) he became professor extraordinarius in philosophy and lecturer in Old Testament exegesis. In 1830, Ewald married Wilhelmine Gauss (1808–1840), the daughter of mathematician Carl Friedrich Gauss. Of all of Gauss's children, Wilhelmina was said to have come closest to her father's talent, but she died in 1840. In 1831 Heinrich Ewald was promoted to professor ordinarius in philosophy; in 1833 he became a member of the Royal Scientific Society, and in 1835, after Tychsen's death, he entered the faculty of theology, taking the chair of Oriental languages.

Two years later occurred the first important episode in Ewald's studious life. In 1837, on 18 November, along with six of his colleagues he signed a formal protest against the action of King Ernst August in abolishing the liberal constitution of 1833, which had been granted to the House of Hanover by his predecessor William IV. This procedure of the seven professors led to their expulsion from the university (14 December). Early in 1838 Ewald received a call to Tübingen, and there for upwards of ten years he held a chair as professor ordinarius, first in philosophy and afterwards, from 1841, in theology. To this period belong some of his most important works, and also the commencement of his bitter feud with F.C. Baur and the Tübingen school. In 1847, "the great shipwreck-year in Germany," as he has called it, he was invited back to Göttingen on honourable terms—the liberal constitution having been restored. He accepted the invitation.

In 1845, Ewald remarried, this time to Auguste Schleiermacher (1822–1897); the couple had a daughter in 1850 who was named Caroline Therese Wilhelmine.

In 1862-1863 Ewald took an active part in a movement for reform within the Hanoverian Church, and he was a member of the synod which passed the new constitution. He had an important share also in the formation of the Protestantenverein, or Protestant association, in September 1863. But the chief crisis in his life arose out of the Austro-Prussian War of 1866. His loyalty to King George V of Hanover (son of Ernst August) would not permit him to take the oath of allegiance to the victorious King William I of Prussia, and he was therefore placed on the retired list, though with the full amount of his salary as pension.

This degree of severity might have been held by the Prussian authorities to be unnecessary, had Ewald been less hostile in his language. The violent tone of some of his printed manifestoes about this time, especially of his Lob des Königs u. des Volkes, led to his being deprived of the venia legendi (1868) and also to a criminal trial, which, however, resulted in his acquittal (May 1869). Then, and on two subsequent occasions, he was returned by the city of Hanover as a member of the North German and German parliaments. In June 1874 he was found guilty of a libel on Otto von Bismarck, whom he had compared to Frederick the Great in "his unrighteous war with Austria and his ruination of religion and morality," to Napoleon III in his way of "picking out the best time possible for robbery and plunder." For this offence he was sentenced to undergo three weeks' imprisonment. He died in Göttingen of heart disease.

== Influence ==
In his public life Ewald displayed characteristics such as simplicity and sincerity, moral earnestness, independence, absolute fearlessness. As a teacher he had a remarkable power of kindling enthusiasm; and he taught many distinguished pupils, including August Schleicher, Ferdinand Hitzig, Eberhard Schrader, Theodor Noldeke, Diestel and Christian Friedrich August Dillmann. His disciples were not all of one school, but many eminent scholars who apparently have been untouched by his influence have in fact developed some of the many ideas which he suggested.

Ewald's Hebrew Grammar inaugurated a new era in biblical philology. Subsequent works in that department were avowedly based on his, and Hitzig referred to him as "the second founder of the science of the Hebrew language." He made important contributions as an exegete, biblical critic and grammarian. In particular, his Geschichte des Volkes Israel, the result of thirty years' labour, was important in that branch of research.

Taking up the idea of a divine education of the human race, and firmly believing that Providence assigned a special task to each of the leading nations of antiquity, Ewald felt no difficulty about Israel's place in universal history, or about the problem which that race had been called upon to solve. The history of Israel, according to him, was the history how humanity acquired one true religion, beginning with the exodus and culminating in the appearing of Jesus.

The historical interval that separated these two events is treated as naturally dividing itself into three great periods—those of Moses, David and Ezra. The periods are externally indicated by the successive names by which the chosen people were called—Hebrews, Israelites, Jews. The events prior to the exodus are relegated by Ewald to a preliminary chapter of primitive history; and the events of the apostolic and post-apostolic age are treated as a kind of appendix. The entire construction of the history is based on a critical examination and chronological arrangement of the available documents.

== Works ==
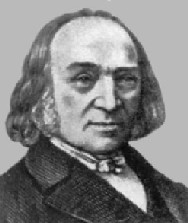
Heinrich Ewald

The more important of Ewald's works are:

- Die Composition der Genesis kritisch untersucht (1823), an attempt to account for the use of the two names of God without recourse to the documentary hypothesis; he was not himself, however, permanently convinced by it.
- De metris carminum Arabicorum (1825)
- Des Hohelied Salomons übersetzt und erklärt (1826; 3rd ed, 1866)
- Über einige ältere Sanskritmetra (1827)
- Kritische Grammatik der hebräischen Sprache (Leipzig 1827), was abridged and published under a new title: Grammatik der hebräischen Sprache (Leipzig 1828); 2nd ed. of the abridged version (Leipzig 1835) [English translation of the 1835 ed. by John Nicholson (1809–1886): A Grammar of the Hebrew Language of the Old Testament (London 1836)]; 3rd ed. (Leipzig 1838). The subsequent editions [numbered 5th to 8th] were published under the title of Ausführliches Lehrbuch der hebräischen Sprache, 5th ed. (Leipzig 1844); 6th ed. (Leipzig 1855); 7th ed. (Göttingen 1863); 8th ed. (Göttingen 1870). English translation of the third part (Syntax) of the 1870 ed., by James Kennedy: Syntax of the Hebrew Language of the Old Testament (Edinburgh 1879; 1891).
- Hebräische Sprachlehre für Anfänger (Leipzig 1842); 2nd ed. (Leipzig 1855); 3rd ed. (Göttingen 1862) [English translation of the 1862 ed. by J. Frederick Smith: Ewald's Introductory Hebrew Grammar (London: Asher 1870)]; 4th ed. (Göttingen 1874).
- Liber Vakedu de Mesopotamiae expugnatae historia (1827)
- Commentarius in Apocalypsin Johannis (1828)
- Abhandlungen zur biblischen und orientalischen Literatur (1832)
- Grammatica critica linguae Arabicae (1831–1833)
- Die poetischen Bücher des alten Bundes (1835–1837, 3rd ed, 1866–1867)
- Plan dieser Zeitschrift. In: Zeitschrift für die Kunde des Morgenlandes 1 (1837), pp. 3–13.
- Verzeichniss der orientalischen Handschriften der Universitätsbibliothek zu Tübingen (1839)
- Die Propheten des alten Bundes (1840-1841, 2nd ed., 1867-1868 [English translation: Commentary on the Prophets of the Old Testament in five volumes, 1875]
- Geschichte des Volkes Israel (1843-1859, 3rd ed., 1864-1868 [English translation: The History of Israel in eight volumes, 1869-1883]
- Die Alterthümer des Volkes Israel (1848, 3rd ed., 1866)
- Die drei ersten Evangelien übersetzt u. erklärt (1850)
- Über das äthiopische Buch Henoch (1854)
- Über die phönikischen Ansichten von der Weltschöpfung und den geschichtlichen Wert Sanchuniathons (1857)
- Die Sendschreiben des Apostels Paulus übersetzt und erklärt (1857)
- Sprachwissenschaftliche Abhandlungen (3 parts, 1861–71)
- Die Johanneischen Schriften übersetzt und erklärt (1861–1862)
- Über des vierte Esrabuch (1863)
- The Life of Jesus Christ (1865) (translated from German by Octavius Glover) (1865)
- Sieben Sendschreiben des neuen Bundes (1870)
- Das Sendschreiben an die Hebräer und Jakobos' Rundschreiben (1870)
- Die Lehre der Bibel von Gott, oder Theologie des alten und neuen Bundes (1871–1875).
- Das Buch Ijob (1854) [English translation of the 1882 edition by J. Frederick Smith: Commentary on the book of Job ISBN 0-8370-3085-4 ]
- Commentary on the Psalms (2019) ISBN 978-0530138312

The Jahrbücher der biblischen Wissenschaft (1849–1865) were edited, and for the most part written, by him. He was the chief promoter of the Zeitschrift für die Kunde des Morgenlandes, begun in 1837; and he frequently contributed on various subjects to the Göttingische gelehrte Anzeigen. He was also the author of many pamphlets.
