= Joseph Bardsley =

Anglican clergyman (1825–1896)

The Venerable Archdeacon Joseph Bardsley M.A., D.D. (8 February 1825 - 23 June 1896) was an Anglican clergyman.

Born at Waterhead, near Oldham, Lancashire, a younger brother of James Bardsley who became an honorary canon of Manchester Cathedral, in 1845 he entered Queen's College, Cambridge. He graduated with a B.A. degree in 1849 and was ordained a deacon in the same year, and as a priest in 1850. His first post was a curate in Burnley, Lancashire. In 1852 he became the clerical superintendent of the Liverpool Church of England Scripture Readers Society, and in 1857 became the incumbent of the parish of St Silas, Liverpool.

In 1860 he accepted an invitation from the Bishop of London to become the secretary of the London Diocesan Home Mission, and moved to the capital. From 1869 to 1880 he was rector of Stepney, a deprived East End parish. He was well known in the area for his charitable and educational activities. In 1873 he was elected to the London School Board as one of the representatives of Tower Hamlets. In 1874 a new Diocese of Ballarat, Victoria, Australia was created, and Bardsley was approached to become the first bishop of the see, but declined. He was elected to a second term on the school board in 1876, retiring at the 1879 election.

In 1880 he was appointed vicar of Bradford in Yorkshire. In 1893 he was appointed Archdeacon of Craven and in 1895 residentiary Canon of Ripon. He died suddenly in Bradford in June 1896, aged 71.

Pamphlet reviewed here and mention here
