= Alfred William Gibb =

Scottish geologist

- Born: (1864–1937)
- Died: (age 73)
- Occupation: Geologist

Academic background
- Education: Professor
- Alma mater: Aberdeen University

Alfred William Gibb FRSE (1864–1937) was a Scottish geologist. He was Professor of Geology at Aberdeen University 1922 to 1936.

== Education ==
He was educated at the Gymnasium in Old Aberdeen and then attended Aberdeen University graduating MA in 1884. After a time teaching he returned to university for a Science degree, graduating BSc in 1897.

== Academic career ==
On the recommendation of Prof Henry Alleyne Nicholson had been lecturing in Geology since 1895 at the grade of Assistant Lecturer. In 1900, following further postgraduate study at Heidelberg under Prof Rosenbusch, John Arthur Thomson promoted Gibb to full Lecturer. In 1911 he was living at 1 Belvidere Street in Aberdeen.

He was elected a Fellow of the Royal Society of Edinburgh in 1916. His proposers were John Horne, Benjamin Neeve Peach, Sir John Arthur Thomson and Sir John Smith Flett.

In 1922 he became the first Professor of Geology under the newly created Kilgour chair at Aberdeen. He resigned his post in 1936.

He died on 12 July 1937.
