= John Nicholson (bookseller) =

English bookseller

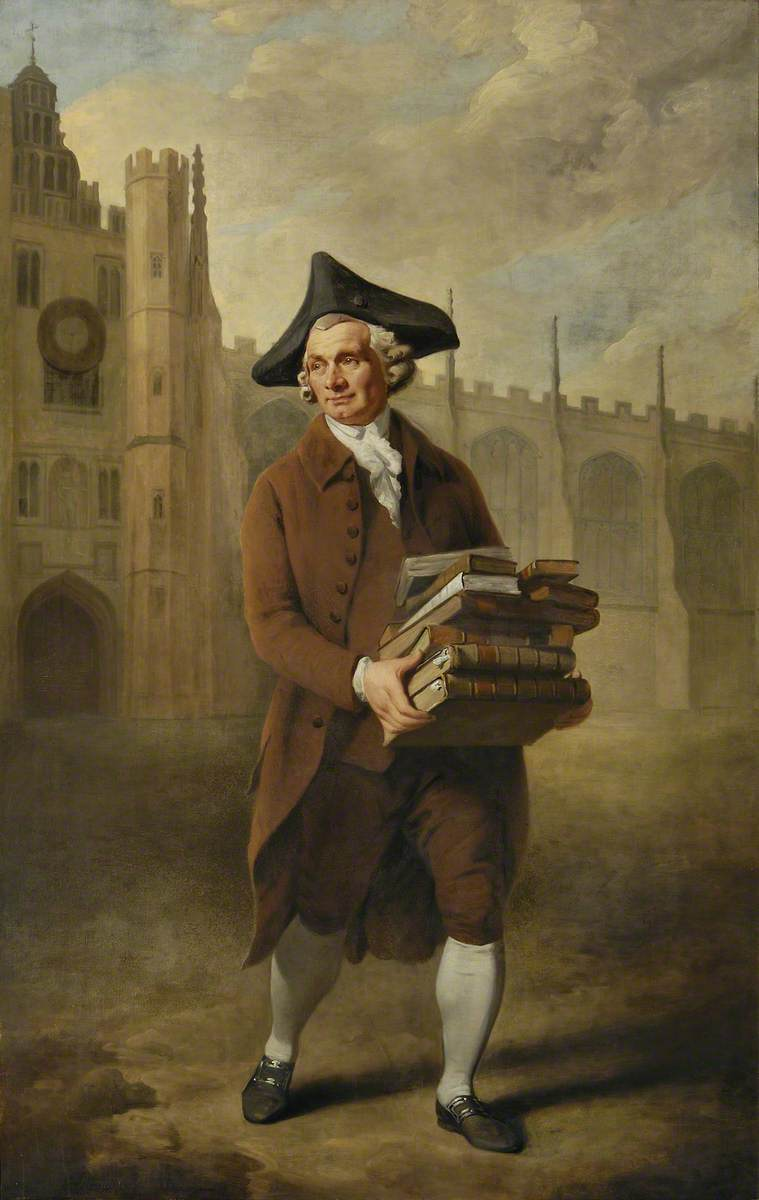
- By Philip Reinagle
- Born: 1730
- Died: 8 August 1796 (aged 65–66)
- Occupation: Bookseller

John Nicholson (1730 – 8 August 1796) was an English bookseller.

== Biography ==
Nicholson was the son of a farmer at Mountsorrel in Leicestershire. He was probably the "John, son of Edward Nichols (?) and Mary his wife," who was baptised at St. Peter's Church, Mountsorrel, on 19 April 1730 (parish register). On 28 March 1752 he married Anne, the only child of Robert Watts (d. 31 Jan. 1751–2), a bookseller in Cambridge, who started the first circulating library in the town about 1745. By this marriage he succeeded to Watts's business and to his sobriquet of "Maps," which he had gained by his habit of announcing himself at the doors of his customers by calling out "maps." Both business and habit were energetically continued by Nicholson, who acquired a large connection among the students of the university, supplying them with their class-books by subscription. He died on 8 August 1796, and was buried in the churchyard of St. Edmund, Cambridge. His widow lived till 7 February 1814. Nicholson was greatly respected in Cambridge. He was both a good tradesman and a generous friend, readily allowing the free use of his library to poor students, whom even his moderate charges would have debarred from the privilege. His portrait, painted by Philip Reinagle, was hung on the staircase of the university library. It was engraved by James Caldwall in 1790, and the engraving was sold for the benefit of Addenbrooke's hospital; another, engraved by Joshua Baldrey, is mentioned by Bromley. He was the subject of the following Greek hexameter, which was familiar to the undergraduates of his time:

Μαψ αὐτὸν καλέουσι θεοί, ἄνδρες δὲ Νιχολσον.

Some verses written on seeing his portrait over the door of a country library were printed in The Gentleman's Magazine (1816, ii. 613). Nicholson was succeeded in his business by his son John, who carried it on in the original shop in front of King's College till 1807, when he removed to the corner of Trinity Street and St. Mary's Street. Retiring about 1821 (he died at Stoke Newington 25 April 1825), he was succeeded by his son, the third John Nicholson (1781–1822). The last-mentioned was the author of two anonymously published plays:

"Pætus and Arria," Cambridge, 1809; a tragedy, which was announced for performance at Drury Lane on 2 Jan. 1812, but was never acted, and is described by Genest as "insipid to the last degree." "Right and Wrong," London, 1812, a comedy.
