= Alleyne Ireland =

British traveller and author (1871–1951)

Walter Alleyne Ireland (19 January 1871, Manchester – 23 December 1951) was a British traveller and author on the tropical colonies of the British empire.

== Life ==
His mother was the biographer Annie Elizabeth Nicholson Ireland and his father was the journalist Alexander Ireland; his brother was the composer John Ireland. Educated at Manchester Grammar School and the University of Berlin, Alleyne Ireland visited Australia, Canada, India, Burma, the Malay Peninsula, Java, Borneo, French Indo-China, the Philippines, the West Indies and British Guiana. In 1902–1904 for the Times of London he wrote twelve articles on British colonial administration in the tropics. He lectured at Cornell University, the University of Chicago and the Lowell Institute and was on the staff of the New York World.

Alleyne Ireland served as one of Joseph Pulitzer's private secretaries, an experience he recorded in An Adventure with a Genius: Recollections of Joseph Pulitzer.

== Selected works ==
- Demerariana. Baldwin. 1897; 104 pages
- Tropical Colonization. The Macmillan company; Macmillan & co. 1899.
- "The Cohesive Elements of British Imperialism". The Outlook. 63: 1011–1015. 1899.
- The Anglo-Boer Conflict. Small, Maynard & company. 1900.
- "Some Conditions of Success in Colonization". The Independent. 52: 1593–1597. 1900.
- "A Few Facts about the Colonies of the Great Powers". McClure's Magazine. Vol. 14. 1900. pp. 334–338.
- China and the Powers. Priv. print. for L. Maynard by G. H. Ellis co. 1901.
- The Far Eastern Tropics. Houghton, Mifflin. 1905.
- The Province of Burma. His Colonial administration in the Far East. Houghton, Mifflin and company. 1907.
- Joseph Pulitzer: Reminiscences of a Secretary. M. Kennerly. 1914.
- Beating 'em to it; or, The sultan and the sausages, by Chester Cornish [pseud.] Illustrations by Alfred J. Frueh. A. A. Knopf. 1917; 120 pages
- Hammond, John Hays; Ireland, Alleyne (1918). The Truth about the Jameson raid, by John Hays Hammond as related to Alleyne Ireland.
- Democracy and the Human Equation. E. P. Dutton & company. 1921.
- Can we save constitutional government? A memorandum. 1922; 16 page pamphlet
- New Korea. E. P. Dutton. 1926; 354 pages
