= Henry Dunckley =

Henry Dunckley (24 December 1823 – 29 June 1896) was an English Baptist minister, journalist and newspaper editor.

== Early life and education ==
Dunckley was born in Warwick. He was educated at the Baptist college at Accrington, Lancashire, and at the University of Glasgow.

== Career ==
Dunckley became in 1848 minister of the Baptist church at Salford, Lancashire. He closely investigated the educational needs of the working-classes, and in 1851 he wrote an essay, The Glory and the Shame of Britain, summarizing the results of his inquiries. The essay won a prize offered by the Religious Tract Society. In 1852 he won the Anti-Corn-law Leagues prize with an essay on the results of the free-trade policy, published in 1854 under the title The Charter of the Nations.

In 1855 he abandoned the ministry to edit the Manchester Examiner and Times, a prominent Liberal newspaper, in charge of which he remained till 1889. For twenty years he wrote, over the signature Verax, weekly letters to the Manchester papers; those on The Crown and the Cabinet (1877) and The Crown and the Constitution (1878) evoked so much enthusiasm that a public subscription was set on foot to present the writer with a handsome testimonial for his public services. In 1878 Dunckley, who had often declined to stand for parliament, was elected a member of the Reform Club in recognition of his services to the Liberal party, and in 1883 he was made an LL.D. by Glasgow University. He died at Manchester on 29 June 1896.
