= John Nicholson (Northamptonshire cricketer) =

English cricketer

John Simmonds Nicholson (1903–1950) was an English cricketer active from 1924 to 1928 who played for Northamptonshire. He appeared in 64 first-class matches as a right-handed batsman who bowled right arm medium pace. Nicholson was born in Irthlingborough, Northamptonshire on 30 April 1903 and died in Bedford on 18 March 1950. He scored 778 runs with a highest score of 45 and took 93 wickets with a best performance of five for 40.
