= Henry Alleyne Nicholson =

British palaeontologist and zoologist (1844–1899)

Henry Alleyne Nicholson FRS FRSE FGS FLS
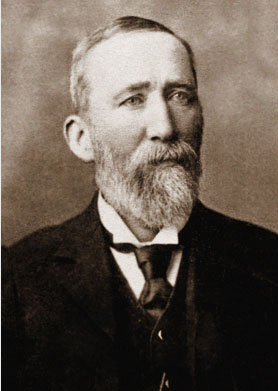
- Born: 11 September 1844; Penrith, Cumbria
- Died: 19 January 1899 (aged 54); Aberdeen
- Education: Appleby Grammar School; University of Göttingen; University of Edinburgh
- Parents: John Nicholson (father); Annie Elizabeth Waring (mother)
- Relatives: Annie Elizabeth Nicholson Ireland (sister), John Henry Nicholson (brother)
- Awards: Lyell Medal (1888)
- Scientific career
- Fields: Geology; Paleontology; Zoology
- Institutions: University of Toronto; Durham College of Science; University of Aberdeen

Henry Alleyne Nicholson FRS FRSE FGS FLS (11 September 1844 – 19 January 1899) was a British palaeontologist and zoologist.

== Life ==
The son of John Nicholson (1809–1886), a biblical scholar, and his wife Annie Elizabeth Waring, he was born at Penrith, Cumberland on 11 September 1844. His younger sister was the writer Annie Elizabeth Nicholson Ireland, and one of his brothers was John Henry Nicholson, author and poet. He was educated at Appleby Grammar School and then studied Sciences at the universities of Göttingen (Ph.D., 1866) and Edinburgh (D.Sc., 1867; M.D., 1869). Geology had early attracted his attention, and his first publication was a thesis for his D.Sc. degree titled On the Geology of Cumberland and Westmoreland (1868).

In 1869 he began lecturing in Natural History at the extramural classes linked to Edinburgh University.

In 1871 he was appointed professor of natural history in the University of Toronto; in 1874 professor of biology in the Durham College of Science and in 1875 professor of natural history in the University of St. Andrews. This last post he held until 1882, when he became Regius Professor of natural history in the University of Aberdeen.

In 1870 he was elected a Fellow of the Royal Society of Edinburgh his proposer being Peter Handyside. He was elected a Fellow of the Royal Society of London in 1897.

His original work was mainly on fossil invertebrata (graptolites, stromatoporoids and corals); but he did much field work, especially in the Lake District, where he labored in company with Robert Harkness and afterwards with John Edward Marr. He was awarded the Lyell Medal by the Geological Society in 1888.

In 1898 he promoted Alfred William Gibb as the first Professor of Geology at Aberdeen University. Nicholson retired in 1899.

He died at Aberdeen on 19 January 1899.

== Publications ==
During his career he published 167 papers, usually as the sole author, and 12 textbooks, most importantly The Ancient Life History of the Earth.

- Ancient Life-History of the Earth (1877).
- Manual of Zoology (of which there were 7 editions) and other text-books of Zoology.
- Manual of Palaeontology (1872, 3rd ed, 2 vols., with Richard Lydekker, 1889).
- Monograph of the Silurian Fossils of the Girvan District in Ayrshire (with R. Etheridge, jun.) (1878–1880).
- Monograph of the British Stromatoporoids in Palaeontograph. Soc. (1886–1892).
- Lives and labours of leading naturalists (1894)

== Gallery ==
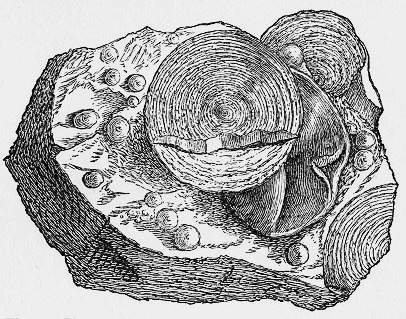
Piece of Nummulitic Limestone from the Great Pyramid, Ancient Life-History of the Earth
