= John Nicolson (Australian cricketer) =

Australian cricketer

Personal information
- Born: 14 April 1917; Campbell Town, Tasmania, Australia
- Died: 7 October 1992 (aged 75); Launceston, Tasmania, Australia

Domestic team information
- Years: Team
- 1936-1939: Tasmania
- Source: Cricinfo, 6 March 2016

John Nicolson (14 April 1917 – 7 October 1992) was an Australian cricketer. He played four first-class matches for Tasmania between 1936 and 1939.

== See also ==
- List of Tasmanian representative cricketers
