= Emmelsbüll-Horsbüll =

Emmelsbüll-Horsbüll Embsbøl-Horsbøl / Ämesbel-Hoorbel
- Municipality
- Coat of arms

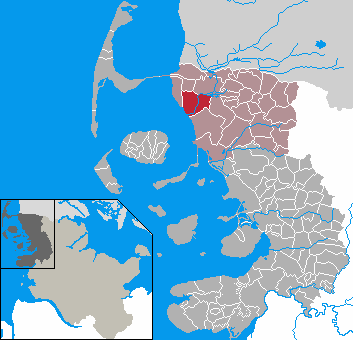
- Location of Emmelsbüll-Horsbüll; Embsbøl-Horsbøl / Ämesbel-Hoorbel within Nordfriesland district
- Interactive map of Emmelsbüll-Horsbüll; Embsbøl-Horsbøl / Ämesbel-Hoorbel
- Location within Germany Location within Schleswig-Holstein
- Coordinates: 54°48′36″N 8°41′49″E
- Country: Germany
- State: Schleswig-Holstein
- District: Nordfriesland
- Municipal assoc.: Südtondern

Government
  - Mayor: Walter Sieger

Area
  - Total: 35.73 km^{2} (13.80 sq mi)
- Elevation: 0 m (0 ft)

Population (2025-12-31)
  - Total: 909
  - Density: 25.4/km^{2} (65.9/sq mi)
- Time zone: UTC+01:00 (CET)
  - Summer (DST): UTC+02:00 (CEST)
- Postal codes: 25924
- Dialling codes: 04665
- Vehicle registration: NF
- Website: www.emmelsbuell-horsbuell.net

Emmelsbüll-Horsbüll (Danish: Embsbøl-Horsbøl, North Frisian Ämesbel-Hoorbel) is a municipality in the district of Nordfriesland, in Schleswig-Holstein, Germany.
