= William Arthur James Wallace =

Irish army officer and engineer

- Born: 4 January 1842; Kingstown, County Dublin
- Died: 6 February 1902 (aged 60); London
- Occupations: Army colonel and royal engineer

William Arthur James Wallace CIE (4 January 1842 – 6 February 1902) was an Irish army officer and engineer in India.

== Biography ==
Wallace was born at Kingstown, County Dublin, on 4 January 1842. He was the son of William James Wallace, J.P., of co. Wexford. Educated at private schools and at the Royal Military Academy at Woolwich, he was commissioned as a lieutenant in the royal engineers on 19 December 1860. After two years' instruction at Chatham and two years' service at home stations, Wallace in 1864 joined the railway branch of the public works department in India. He became an executive engineer in 1871, then deputy consulting engineer for guaranteed railways administered from Calcutta. Promoted captain on 25 August 1873, and appointed officiating consulting engineer to the government of India at Lucknow in 1877, he went to Europe in 1878 in connection with the railway exhibits to the Paris Exhibition, and on his return to India in the autumn was appointed secretary to the railway conference at Calcutta. He worked out the details of a policy, advocated at the conference, of vigorous railway construction in India, a result of experience gained in the recent famine.

At the end of 1878 Wallace received the thanks of the commander-in-chief, Sir Frederick Haines, for conducting the transport of General Sir Donald Stewart's division over 300 miles of new railway on the Indus Valley line between Multan and Sakkar, on its march to Kandahar. Serving under Sir Frederick Roberts as field engineer to the Kuram Valley column in the Afghan campaign of 1879, Wallace was mentioned in despatches, and commended for his work on road-making and for his energy and skill in the management of the Ahmed Khel Jagis. He received the medal.

Returning from active service to railway work in August, he was appointed engineer-in-chief and manager of the northern Bengal railway at Saidpur, was promoted major on 1 July, and arrived home on furlough in June 1882. On the recommendation of Major-general Sir Andrew Clarke, inspector-general of fortifications, Wallace was made director of a new railway corps, formed of the 8th company of royal engineers, to work the Egyptian railways in the coming Egyptian war. The railway corps contributed largely to the success of the operations in Egypt. The advance from Ismailia was mainly dependent on the transport by railway of supplies, which amounted to 100 tons daily, while another 100 tons had to be stored at the advanced depots at Kassassin and Mahuta (see Report, Professional Papers of the Royal Engineers, vol. ix.). Wallace's improvised corps proved how essential in war such an organisation was, and led to its establishment in the service in an expanded form and on a more permanent basis. Wallace was present at the battle of Tel-el-Kebir on 13 September 1882, and for his services in the campaign was mentioned in despatches, and received a brevet lieut.-colonelcy ion 18 November 1882, medal with clasp, the 4th class of the Osmanieh, and the Khedive's bronze star.

Returning to India in October 1884, Wallace was appointed acting chief engineer to the government of India for guaranteed railways at Lahore. In the spring of the following year, when the Penjdeh incident in Central Asia caused great preparations to be made for war with Russia, Wallace was appointed controller at Lahore of military troops and stores traffic for the frontier. The Afghanistan boundary question was settled in September 1885, but Wallace remained at Lahore as chief engineer for guaranteed railways until his transference to Agra in April 1886. A brevet colonelcy was given to him on 18 November, and in the following year he returned to Lahore as chief engineer of the north-western railway.

In 1888 Wallace reported for the government of India on the Abt system of railways in Switzerland. On 1 January 1890 he was made C.I.E. He retired from the service on 19 Dec. 1892. He died unmarried at Elm Park Gardens, London, on 6 February 1902.
