= Anne Ireland =

English writer and biographer (1842–1893)

Anne Elizabeth Nicholson Ireland
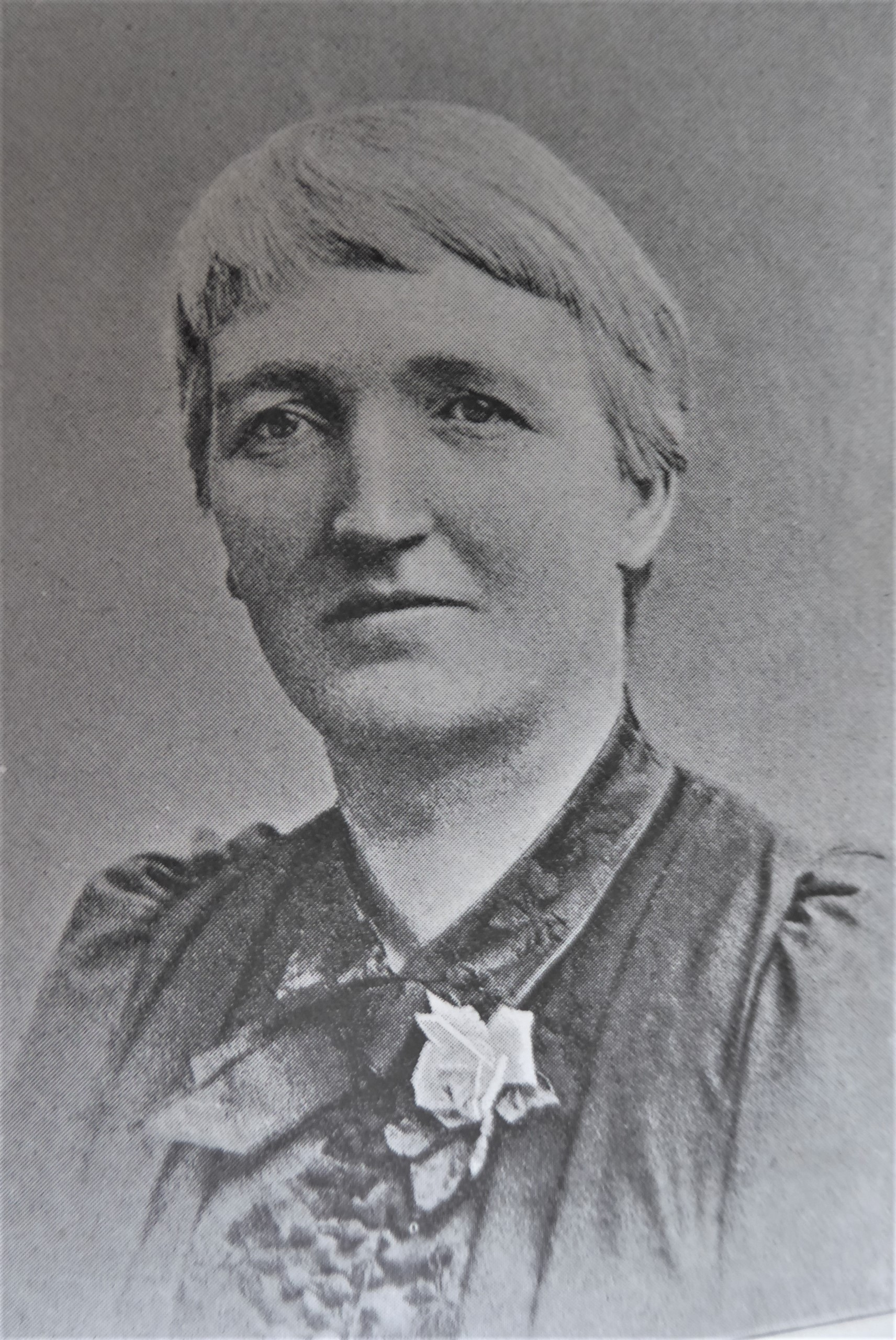
- Born: 1842; Penrith, Cumbria
- Died: 4 October 1893 (aged 50–51); Fallowfield, Manchester
- Occupation: Writer
- Writing career
- Pen name: Mrs Alexander Ireland
- Genre: Biography

Anne "Annie" Elizabeth Nicholson Ireland pseud. Mrs Alexander Ireland (1842 – 4 October 1893) was an English writer and biographer.

== Life ==
She was born in Penrith, Cumberland, to John Nicholson (1809–1886) and his wife, Annie Elizabeth Nicholson, née Waring. Her elder brother, Henry Alleyne Nicholson became the Regius Professor of Natural History at Aberdeen University.

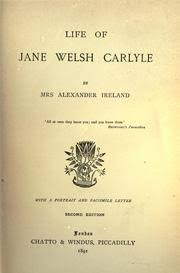
Jane Carlyle biography by "Mrs Alexander Ireland"

Her most renowned work is her biography Life of Jane Welsh Carlyle (1891). She is also known for publishing Jane Carlyle's correspondence with her intimate friend Geraldine Jewsbury. These were published under the name Selections from the Letters of Geraldine Endsor Jewsbury to Jane Welsh Carlyle (1892) by the London publisher Longmans and Co., edited by Ireland herself and prefaced by Jewsbury. Furthermore, Ireland published her recollections of J. A. Froude (which were published after her death in the Contemporary Review).

Ireland was a member of the Browning Society (dedicated to Victorian poet Robert Browning), in which she gave a number of lectures, such as "A Toccata of Galuppi's" at the 66th meeting (26 April 1889) and "Some Remarks on Browning's Treatment of Parenthood" at the 73rd meeting (28 March 1890).

Ireland died on 4 October 1893 at Fallowfield, Manchester.

== Family ==
Ireland was the second wife of Alexander Ireland. They had two notable sons. John Ireland was a composer who taught at the Royal College of Music. Her other son, Alleyne Ireland, wrote Tropical Colonization (1889), The Province of Burma (1907), Democracy and the Human Equation (1921), and The New Korea (1926).

== Works include ==
- Ireland, Annie E. (1888). "George Eliot and Jane Welsh Carlyle," The Gentleman's Magazine, Vol. CCLXIV, pp. 229–238.
- Ireland, Annie E. (1891). Life of Jane Welsh Carlyle. New York: C.L. Webster & Co.
