= Chartered Institute of Journalists =

UK professional association

- Established: 1884
- Website: www.cioj.org

The Chartered Institute of Journalists (CIoJ) is a professional association for journalists and is the senior such body in the UK and the oldest in the world.

== History ==
The Chartered Institute of Journalists was proposed during a meeting in Manchester and later became known as the National Association of Journalists at a meeting in the Grand Hotel in Birmingham in October 1884, "to promote and advance the common interests of the profession of journalism." It changed its name to the Institute of Journalists in 1888, and received a Royal Charter from Queen Victoria in 1890. It petitioned for, and was granted, an additional Royal Charter in 1990, to become the Chartered Institute of Journalists, usually abbreviated as CIoJ.

It also operates as a form of trades union for journalists although it is strictly apolitical. It set up a benevolent fund for distressed journalists in 1898, and an orphans fund in 1891, and also operates a pension fund and another for convalescent members. Unemployment benefits were introduced in 1910 although such benefits, if granted, later became handled by the Benevolent Fund. These charities are all registered with the Charity Commission as number 208176.

Disaffected members left in 1910 to form the rival National Union of Journalists, and unsuccessful attempts to merge the two bodies were made in 1921, 1928, 1943, and 1966. The last introduced a period of dual membership, but the experiment ended within 5 years.

The CIoJ created the Media Society in 1973, and was a founder member of the International News Safety Institute. Although based in the UK, it also has an international division for members outside the UK. It also includes groups for freelance journalists, press photographers, journalists working in broadcasting and press relations.

== Journal of the Institute of Journalists ==
The Journal of the Institute of Journalists LCCN 42-48311.

== See also ==
- John Thackray Bunce
- James Nicol Dunn, President of the then-Institute of Journalists in 1904
- Thomas Sowler
- Charles Frederick Williams
