= Joshua Baldrey =

Joshua Kirby Baldrey (1754–1828), was an engraver and drawing artist.

== Biography ==
Baldrey practised both in London and Cambridge between 1780 and 1810, working both in the chalk and dot manners. Many of his works were printed in colours. He exhibited portraits at the Royal Academy in 1793 and 1794. Among his best works are: The Finding of Moses, after Salvator Rosa, 1785; Diana in a Landscape, after Carlo Maratti; Lady Rawdon, after Reynolds, 1783; and some subjects after Penny and Bunbury. His chief work, however, is from the east window of King's College Chapel, Cambridge, which he drew and engraved, and then finished highly in colours. He published A Dissertation on the Windows of King's College Chapel, Cambridge (Camb. 1818), from which it appears he was engaged on an engraving of one of the south windows. Baldrey died in indigence at Hatfield Wood Side, Hertfordshire, on 6 December 1828, leaving a widow and eleven children.
