= Manchester Courier =

British daily newspaper founded in Manchester, England

The Manchester Courier was a daily newspaper founded in Manchester, England, by Thomas Sowler; the first edition was published on 1 January 1825. Alaric Alexander Watts was the paper's first editor, but remained in the position for only a year.

The newspaper circulation area was in Lancashire, Cheshire, Yorkshire, Shropshire, Cumberland, Staffordshire, and North Wales. An advocate of commerce and agriculture and a supporter of the Church of England, the paper's initial agenda was to act as a counterpoint to the reforms being advocated by The Manchester Guardian, and in particular to proposals for the emancipation of Catholics. It provided Hugh Stowell, rector of St Stephen's Church in Salford, with a platform to "wage war" on any group dissenting from the orthodox views of the Anglican Church, such as Catholics and Jews, but also including Unitarians, whom Stowell doubted even had the right to call themselves Christians.

The daily Manchester Evening Mail, established by Thomas Sowler junior in 1874 and closed in 1902, was a companion publication and one of several newspapers which began around that time with the intention of providing a less highbrow alternative to their longer-established stablemates. The introduction of the Mail coincided with the Courier becoming a weekly newspaper.

In 1905, Lord Northcliffe purchased the Manchester Courier and installed James Nicol Dunn as editor "with a big fanfare of trumpets and a large ceremonial lunch". Northcliffe's adventures in northern newspapers was ultimately unsuccessful: Dunn served as editor from 1905 and 1910, and in 1916 the newspaper ceased publication.
