= John Burley Waring =

English architect

John Burley Waring (1823 – 1875) was an English architect.

== Life ==
Waring was born at Lyme Regis, Dorset, on 29 June 1823; he was the son of Henry Waring (1773–1837), a naval captain, and his wife Margaret Franks. He owed his early love for literature to the Penny Magazine.

From 1836, Waring was educated at a branch of University College, London, then existing at Bristol, where he was also taught watercolour-drawing by Samuel Jackson. In 1840 he was apprenticed to Henry E. Kendall, architect, London. In 1842, he became a student in the Royal Academy, and in 1843 was awarded a medal at the Society of Arts for designs in architectural adornments. His health being delicate and his income ample, he spent the winter of 1843–4 in Italy ‘to improve himself in art and to become a painter.’ On returning to England he was a draughtsman successively in the offices of Ambrose Poynter, Laing of Birkenhead, Sir Robert Smirke (1846), and David Alfred Mocatta (1847).

With Thomas R. Macquoid he went to Italy and Spain in 1847 and studied architecture, measuring and drawing the public buildings. The result was a work entitled ‘Architectural Art in Italy and Spain,’ published in 1850. For this the only remuneration received by the authors was a moderate payment for lithographing the sixty fine folio plates. Singly he produced ‘Designs for Civic Architecture,’ formed on a style of his own, possessing merit and a considerable share of beauty. In 1850–1 and 1851–2 he studied in the atelier of Thomas Couture in Paris, and drew assiduously from the life. He afterwards resided at Burgos, and studied the Miraflores monuments. In conjunction with Sir Matthew Digby Wyatt, he in 1854 wrote four architectural guide-books to the courts of the Crystal Palace at Sydenham. While again in Italy in 1855 he made a further series of drawings, which were purchased for the South Kensington Museum, and published in 1858 as ‘The Arts connected with Architecture in Central Italy.’

He was appointed superintendent of the works of ornamental art and sculpture in the Manchester Exhibition in 1857, and edited the ‘Art Treasures of the United Kingdom,’ 1858. In the International Exhibition at Kensington in 1862 he was the superintendent of the architectural gallery and of the classes for furniture, earthenware, and glass, goldsmiths' work and jewellery, and objects used in architecture. In connection with this exhibition he published in three volumes ‘Masterpieces of Industrial Art and Sculpture,’ 1862, consisting of three hundred coloured plates, the description of which in English and French he himself wrote. He was chief commissioner of the exhibition of works of art held at Leeds in 1868. During a succeeding tour in Italy he sent a series of notes to the ‘Architect.’ In February 1871 the American Institute of Architects elected him an honorary member, but he obtained little practice.

At the age of twenty Waring was an enthusiastic admirer of Swedenborg's doctrines; later he somewhat changed his opinions, and in his ‘Record of Thoughts on Religious, Political, Social, and Personal Subjects’ (2 vols. 1873), he advanced an eccentric claim to write under ‘special divine inspiration’ and the power of making prophecies concerning political events.

He died at Hastings on 23 March 1875.

== Works ==
In addition to the works already mentioned he published: 1. ‘Poems. By an Architect,’ 1858. 2. ‘Architectural, Sculptural, and Picturesque Studies in Burgos,’ 1852. 3. ‘Masterpieces of Industrial Art and Sculpture at the International Exhibition,’ 1863. 4. ‘Illustrations of Architecture and Ornament,’ 1865. 5. ‘The Universal Church,’ 1866. 6. ‘Broadcast,’ short essays, 1870. 7. ‘The English Alphabet considered Philosophically,’ 1870. 8. ‘Stone Monuments, Tumuli, and Ornaments of Remote Ages, with Remarks on the Early Architecture of Ireland and Scotland,’ 1870. 9. ‘A Record of my Artistic Life,’ 1873. 10. ‘The State,’ a sequel to ‘The Universal Church,’ 1874. 11. ‘Ceramic Art in Remote Ages, with Essays on the Symbols of the Circle, the Cross and Circle, showing their Relation to the Primitive Forms of Solar and Nature Worship,’ 1874. 12. ‘Thoughts and Notes for 1874 and 1874–5,’ two series, 1874–5. He edited Sir M. D. Wyatt's ‘Observations on Metallic Art,’ 1857, and ‘Art Treasures of the United Kingdom, with Essays,’ 1858.
