= Anti–Corn Law League =

Former political movement in Great Britain

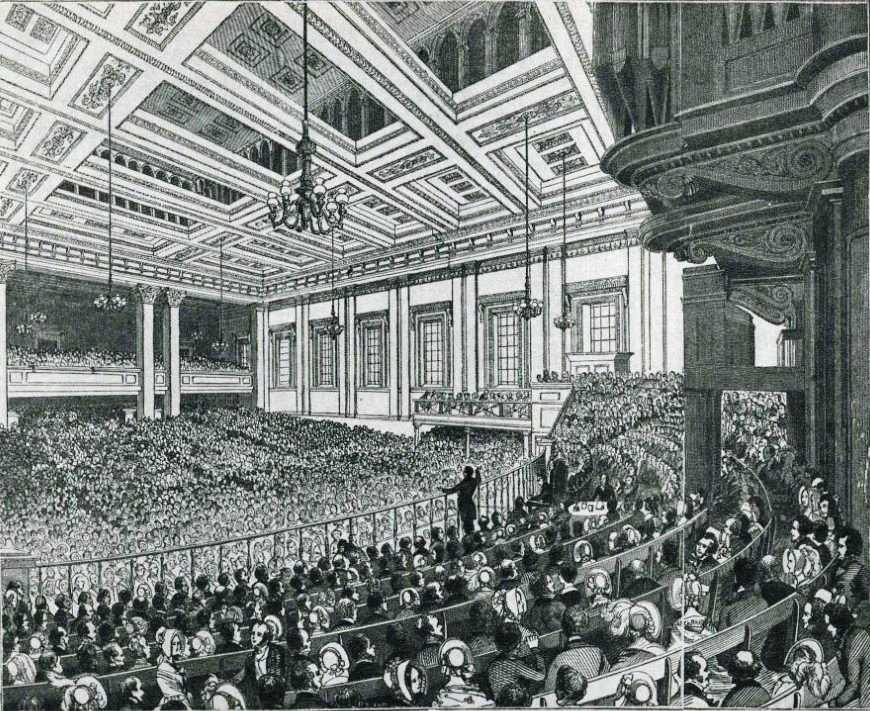
A meeting of the Anti–Corn Law League in Exeter Hall in 1846

The Anti–Corn Law League was a successful political movement in Great Britain aimed at the abolition of the unpopular Corn Laws, which protected national farming interests by levying taxes on imported wheat, thus raising the price of bread at a time when factory-owners were trying to cut wages. The League was a middle-class nationwide organisation that held many well-attended rallies on the premise that a crusade was needed to convince parliament to repeal the corn laws. Its long-term goals included the removal of feudal privileges, which it denounced as impeding progress, lowering economic well-being, and restricting freedom.

The League played little role in the final act in 1846, when Sir Robert Peel led the successful battle for repeal. However, its experience provided a model that was widely adopted in Britain and other democratic nations to demonstrate the organisation of a political pressure group with the popular base.

== Corn Laws ==
The Corn Laws were taxes on imported grain introduced in 1815. The laws indeed did raise food prices and became the focus of opposition from urban groups who had less political power than rural Britain. The corn laws initially prohibited foreign corn completely from being imported at below 80s a quarter, a process replaced by a sliding scale in 1828. Such import duties still made it expensive for anyone to import grain from other countries, even when food supplies were short. The League was responsible for turning public and elite opinion against the laws. It was a large, nationwide middle-class moral crusade with a utopian vision. Its leading advocate Richard Cobden, according to historian Asa Briggs, promised that repeal would settle four great problems simultaneously:

- First, it would guarantee the prosperity of the manufacturer by affording him outlets for his products.
- Second, it would relieve the 'condition of England question' by cheapening the price of food and ensuring more regular employment.
- Third, it would make English agriculture more efficient by stimulating demand for its products in urban and industrial areas.
- Fourth, it would introduce through mutually advantageous international trade a new era of international fellowship and peace. The only barrier to these four beneficent solutions was the ignorant self-interest of the landlords, the 'bread-taxing oligarchy, unprincipled, unfeeling, rapacious and plundering.'

== The League ==
The first Anti–Corn Law Association was set up in London in 1836; but it was not until 1838 that the nationwide League, combining all such local associations, was founded, with Richard Cobden and John Bright among its leaders. Cobden was the chief strategist; Bright was its great orator. A representative activist was Thomas Perronet Thompson, who specialized in the grass-roots mobilisation of opinion through pamphlets, newspaper articles, correspondence, speeches, and endless local planning meetings. The League was based in Manchester and had support from numerous industrialists, especially in the textile industry.

The League borrowed many of the tactics first developed by British abolitionists, while also attempting to replicate its mantle of moral reform. Among these were the use of emotionally charged meetings and closely argued tracts: nine million were distributed by a staff of 800 in 1843 alone. The League also used its financial strength and campaign resources to defeat protectionists at by-elections by enfranchising League supporters through giving them a 40-shilling freehold: the strategy certainly alarmed the Tories. One of the most nationally visible efforts came in the 1843 election in Salisbury. Its candidate was defeated, and it was unable to convince voters regarding free trade. The political parties in the 1830s targeted bigger cities for more support on 'free trade'. However, the League did learn lessons that helped to transform its political tactics. It learned to concentrate on elections where there was a good expectation of victory.

Nevertheless, the League had a restricted capability for contesting electoral seats, and its role in the final act of 1846 was largely that of creating a favourable climate of opinion. 1845 saw Lord John Russell, the Whig leader, declare for complete repeal of the corn duty as the only way to satisfy the League; while the Tory leader, Sir Robert Peel, had also been privately won over by Cobden's reasoning to the league's way of thinking. When the crunch came, Peel put through a (staggered) repeal through Parliament without a general election, to the applause of Cobden and Bright.

The League then prepared to dissolve itself. The Tory victory of 1852 saw preparations to revive the League, however, in order to keep a watching brief on Protectionist forces; and it was only after Disraeli's 1852 budget that Cobden felt able to write to George Wilson: "The Budget has finally closed the controversy with Protection. ... The League may be dissolved when you like". Many of its members thereafter continued their political activism in the Liberal Party, with the goal of establishing a fully free-trade economy.

W.H. Chaloner argues that the repeal in 1846 marked a major turning point, making free trade the national policy into the 20th century, and demonstrating the power of "Manchester-school" industrial interests over protectionist agricultural interests. He says repeal stabilized wheat prices in the 1850s and 1860s; however other technical developments caused the fall of wheat prices from 1870 to 1894.

== Model for other lobbying organisations ==
A child's plate inscribed with the slogan of the Anti-Corn Law League "Our Bread Untaxed, Our Commerce Free", c. 1838–1846. British Museum

The League marked the emergence of the first powerful national lobbying group into politics, one with a centralized office, consistency of purpose, rich funding, very strong local and national organization, and single-minded dedicated leaders. It elected men to Parliament. Many of its procedures were innovative, while others were borrowed from the anti-slavery movement. It became the model for later reform movements.

The model of the League led to the formation of the Lancashire Public School Association to campaign for free, locally financed and controlled secular education in Lancashire. It later became the National Public-School Association. It had little success because national secular education was a divisive issue even among the radical groups. However, it did help convert the Liberal Party from its laissez-faire philosophy to that of a more interventionist character.

Historian A.C. Howe argues:

Although historians remain divided on the impact of the league on Peel's decision to abandon the corn laws it was undoubtedly, in appearance, the most successful of nineteenth-century single-issue pressure groups, in its ability to generate enthusiasm, support, and unparalleled financial backing. Although its potential was not realized, it had shown the capacity for an extra-parliamentary middle-class organization to reshape politics so as to reflect the anti-aristocratic objectives of a determined band of entrepreneurial politicians.

It remained the model for many diverse pressure groups, for example, the United Kingdom Alliance, the National Educational League, the Navy League, the Tenant League in Ireland, and the National Society in Piedmont, as well as those specifically related to free trade, including the Edwardian Tariff Reform League and Free Trade Union, and in the 1950s S.W. Alexander's Anti-Dear Food League. It also inspired imitators in France, Germany, the Low Countries, Spain, and the United States. The league had only temporarily reshaped the landscape of parliamentary politics but it had helped create a vibrant popular attachment to free trade within British political culture that would last well into the twentieth century.

== Critics ==
- Thomas Carlyle declined invitations to lend support for the league, despite his opposition to the Corn Laws. He wrote to Thomas Ballantyne in January 1840: "the abrogation of the Corn-Laws seems to be the cause of the Middle Classes and manufacturing Capitalists still more than it is that of the Lower Classes,—whose wretched social situation, however it might be alleviated for a few years, could in no wise, as I think, be cured thereby, nor even, without other provisoes, be put more decisively on the way towards cure".
- R. S. Surtees satirized the league in his 1845 novel, Hillingdon Hall. His cockney protagonist refers to "the 'umbuggery of its ways...strong symptoms of utilitarian self-interest"; while a roguish actor is shown being couched as a paid lecturer for the League: "you have nothing to do but repeat the same old story over and over again.... Whatever is wrong, lay it to the corn tax. If a man can't pay his Christmas bills, attribute it to the bread tax".

== See also ==
- Manchester Liberalism
- Canada Corn Act
- Meat riots
