= Hugh Stowell =

Church of England clergyman (1799–1865)

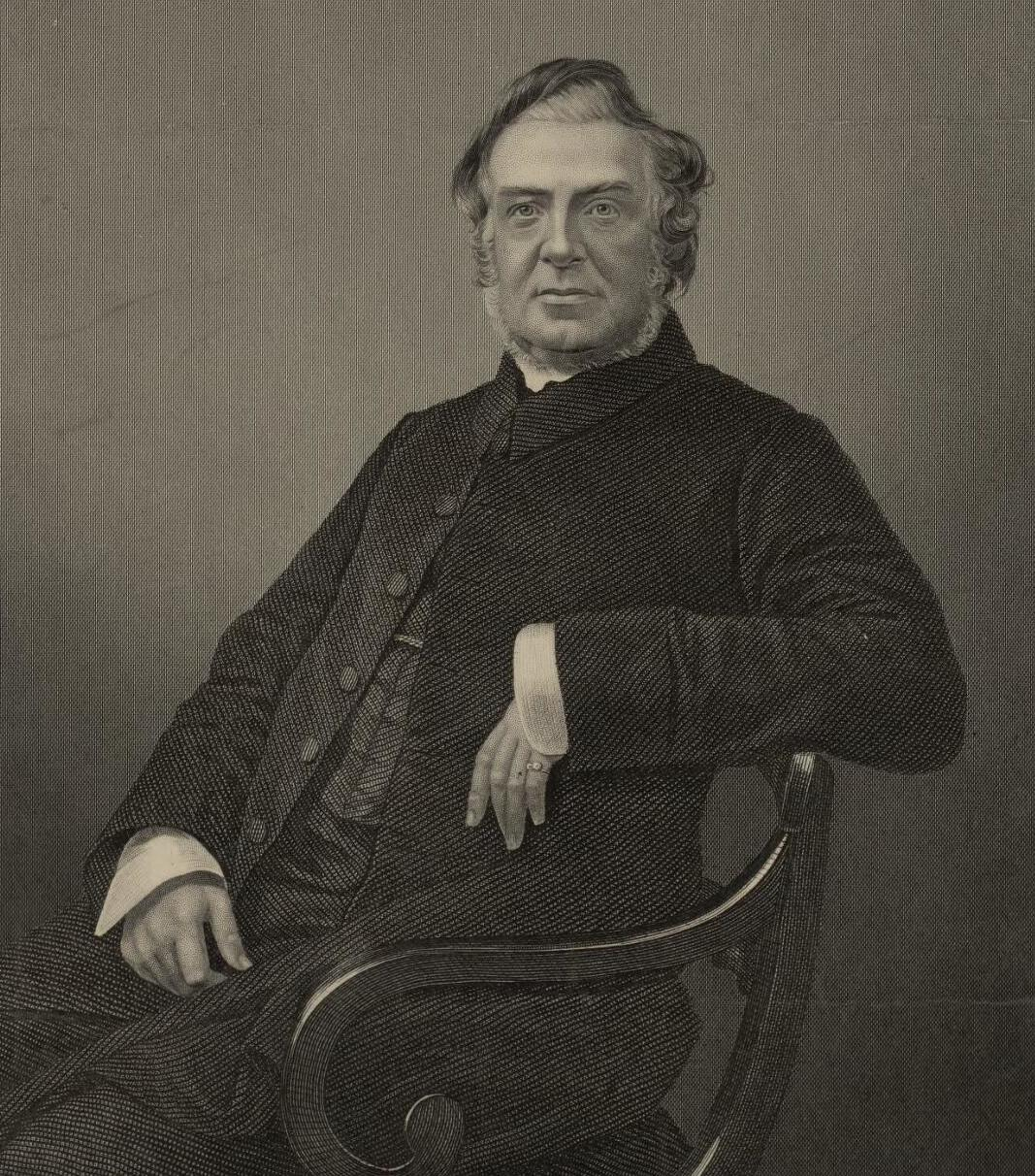
Portrait of Revd. Hugh Stowell

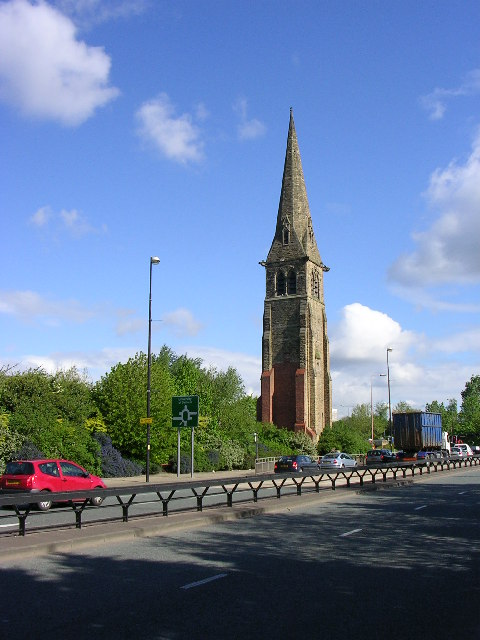
Trafford Road, Salford, with the tower and spire of the former Stowell Memorial Church; the church commemorated the life and work of Canon Hugh Stowell; it was built in 1869 and demolished in 1981

Hugh Stowell (3 December 1799 – 8 October 1865) was a Church of England clergyman with a reputation as a "vigorous and inspiring preacher". He was an implacable opponent of Catholic emancipation whose supporters built Christ Church in Salford, Lancashire, for him, where he remained from its consecration in 1831 until his death.

Stowell gained "national notoriety" as a consequence of the Hearne v Stowell libel case brought against him in 1840 by Daniel Hearne, a Catholic priest. Stowell alleged that Hearne had forced one of his parishioners, John O'Hara, to crawl on his hands and knees through a Manchester street as a penance. O'Hara was known to be insane and was not called as a witness, Stowell's defence claiming that whatever a clergyman said in the performance of his duties was not libellous so long as the clergyman believed it to be true. Stowell was found guilty and ordered to pay damages of 40 shillings, a decision that was reversed on appeal.

== Publications ==
- The Passover: and other sermons preached in Christ Church, Salford
- The Importance of the Protestant Controversy; Or the Church of England and the Church of Rome Contrasted; a Lecture [on Deut. Xxxii. 47], ... Being Introductory to a Course of Sermons “On the Errors of the Church of Rome.”
- The Pleasures of Religion; with Other Poems
- Popery the Great Enemy of England
- Course of Lectures on the Creed of Pope Pius IV. and its Tractarian sympathizers. Lecture on the Romish doctrine of Penance
- The Papacy. A Sermon, Delivered in St. James's Church, Preston ... January 23, 1851
