= Thomas Ballantyne (journalist) =

Scottish journalist

Thomas Ballantyne (1806–1871), was a Scottish journalist.

He was a native of Paisley, where he was born in 1806. Becoming editor of the Bolton Free Press, he at an early period of his life took an active part in advocating social and political reforms. While editor of the Manchester Guardian he became intimately associated with Richard Cobden and John Bright in their agitation against the Corn Laws, and in 1841 he published the Corn Law Repealer's Handbook. Along with Bright he was one of the four original proprietors of the Manchester Examiner, his name appearing as the printer and publisher. After the fusion of the Examiner with the Times, he became editor of the Liverpool Journal, and later of the Mercury. Subsequently he moved to London to edit the Leader, and he was for a time associated with Charles Mackay in the editorial department of the Illustrated London News. He also started the Statesman, which he edited till its close, when he became editor of the Old St. James's Chronicle.

== Bibliography ==
Notwithstanding his journalistic duties, he found time to contribute a number of papers on social and political topics to various reviews and magazines, in addition to which he published:

- Passages selected from the Writings of Thomas Carlyle, with a Biographical Memoir, 1855 and 1870.
- Prophecy for 1855, selected from Carlyle's Latterday Pamphlets, 1855.
- Ideas, Opinions, and Facts, 1865.
- Essays in Mosaic, 1870

Regarding his proficiency in this species of compilation, Carlyle himself testifies as follows: "I have long recognised in Mr. Ballantyne a real talent for excerpting significant passages from books, magazines, newspapers (that contain any such), and for presenting them in lucid arrangement, and in their most interesting and readable form". Ballantyne died at London 30 Aug. 1871.
