= Baden Powell =

Baden-Powell (/ˌbeɪdən ˈpoʊəl/ BAY-dən POH-əl) is a surname. Notable people with the surname include:

== Baden-Powell ==
- Baden Powell I (1767–1841), of Langton and Speldhurst in Kent, wine merchant, High Sheriff of Kent, Master of the Worshipful Company of Mercers
- The Rev. Prof. Baden Powell (mathematician) (1796–1860), mathematician, clergyman and liberal theologian (son of Baden Powell I).

By his first marriage father of:

- Baden Henry Powell (1841–1901), English civil servant.

By his third marriage father of:

- Robert Baden-Powell, 1st Baron Baden-Powell (1857–1941), founder of the Scout Movement.
- Warington Baden-Powell (1847–1921), barrister and first head of the Sea Scouts.
- George Baden-Powell (1847–1898), politician, who also served in the Colonial Service.
- Frank Baden-Powell (1850–1933), barrister and artist.
- Agnes Baden-Powell (1858–1945), noted for her work in establishing the Girl Guides movement.
- Baden Baden-Powell (1860–1937), military aviation pioneer.

- Olave Baden-Powell (1889–1977), daughter-in-law and Robert Baden-Powell's wife, World Chief Guide.
- Arthur Robert Peter Baden-Powell, 2nd Baron Baden-Powell (1913–1962).
- Robert Crause Baden-Powell, 3rd Baron Baden-Powell (1936–2019).
- Michael Baden-Powell, 4th Baron Baden-Powell (1940–2023).
- David Baden-Powell, 5th Baron Baden-Powell (2023–present).
- Baron Baden-Powell, an honorific title given to the head of the family.

== Other people ==
- Baden Powell (guitarist) (1937–2000), Brazilian musician
- Baden Powell (malacologist) (1901–1987), New Zealand malacologist, naturalist and palaeontologist
- Baden Powell (politician) (1900–1955), Australian politician
- Baden Powell (footballer) (1931–2014), English footballer

== See also ==
- Baden-Powell (book), a 1989 biography of Robert Baden-Powell
- Mount Baden-Powell, a peak in the San Gabriel Mountains of California named after Robert Baden-Powell.
- Baden-Powell House, a Scouting hostel and conference centre in South Kensington, London.
- Baden-Powell International House, a hotel and conference centre in Hong Kong.
- Baden (disambiguation)
- Powell (disambiguation)
