= Betty Clay =

British Scouting leader (1917–2004)

The Honourable Betty Clay CBE
- Born: 16 April 1917
- Died: 24 April 2004 (aged 87)
- Other name: Betty St Clair Baden-Powell
- Education: Westonbirt School
- Known for: Guiding and Scouting
- Spouse: Gervas Charles Robert Clay (m. 1936)
- Children: 4
- Parent(s): Robert Baden-Powell, 1st Baron Baden-Powell; Olave Soames
- Family: Baden-Powell

Betty St Clair Clay CBE (née Baden-Powell; 16 April 1917 – 24 April 2004) was the younger daughter of Olave Baden-Powell, the first Chief Guide, and Robert Baden-Powell, 1st Baron Baden-Powell, the founder of Scouting.

== Career ==
Clay enrolled in the Brownies as soon as she was old enough. She was educated at Westonbirt School, Gloucestershire and St James' School in Malvern, Worcestershire. While boarding at St James' School, she joined the school's Girl Guide company.

Clay accompanied her parents on many official tours including some overseas, the first of which was the maiden cruise of the SS Duchess of Richmond round the Mediterranean and down the West Coast of Africa from 26 January to 8 March 1929; she was 11. Other tours were to Switzerland in 1931, and again in 1932 for the opening of "Our Chalet"; to South Africa, and also the first two "Peace Cruises" - on the SS Calgaric in 1933 and on the RMS Adriatic in 1934 - as well as a round-the-world tour which included the first Australian Pan Pacific Scout Jamboree held in Frankston, Australia from 27 December 1934 to 13 January 1935. They also did a tour of Africa in 1935–36, where she met her husband-to-be on the homeward voyage from Cape Town to England.

Upon her marriage on 24 September 1936, Clay moved to Northern Rhodesia, where she became a Cub leader for the pack of which her youngest son was a member, when the previous leader left. She was an active Guider in Northern Rhodesia, eventually becoming Colony Commissioner for Guides. When the Clays returned to England in 1964, Betty continued her involvement. She was President of the South West Region for the Guide Association from 1970 to 1991. In 1978 she was appointed a vice-president of the Guide Association. In 1985 she became a vice-president of the Scout Association.

Clay received from both the Scout and Guide Associations their highest awards for good service: The Silver Wolf from the Scouts in 1984 and a Silver Fish Award from the Guides in 1995. In 1993, she became only the second person ever to be awarded an honorary Gilwell Wood Badge.

== Personal life ==
Clay was the sister of Peter Baden-Powell, 2nd Baron Baden-Powell; the aunt of Robert Baden-Powell, 3rd Baron Baden-Powell, and Michael Baden-Powell, 4th Baron Baden-Powell; the grandmother of murderer, Gerard Baden-Clay; the niece of Agnes Baden-Powell and Baden Baden-Powell; niece and goddaughter of Warington Baden-Powell; and granddaughter of the Rev. Prof. Baden Powell.

In 1936, on board ship returning from Africa, Betty met Gervas Clay (16 April 1907 – 18 April 2009), a District Commissioner in Her Majesty's Colonial Service in Northern Rhodesia (present-day Zambia), who was returning to England on leave; they married on 24 September 1936. Gervas Clay later became Her Majesty's Resident Commissioner of the Barotseland Protectorate, in which capacity, in 1960, he and Betty entertained Queen Elizabeth The Queen Mother. Gervas and Betty Clay had four children. They lived in Northern Rhodesia until they retired to Somerset in 1964.

== Honours ==
She was the holder of the Bronze Wolf from the World Organization of the Scout Movement (WOSM) - their highest award - and a gold Silver Fish in the form of a brooch from the Guide Association.

On 11 February 1997 she was made a Commander of the Most Excellent Order of the British Empire (CBE) by the Queen. She attended many Jamborees, including the 4th World Scout Jamboree and 16th World Scout Jamboree and others between.

She was a member of the Guide Club.

== Death ==
She died, aged 87, on 24 April 2004, in Elliscombe House Nursing Home, where she was recovering following a fall at home. She was cremated in Yeovil Crematorium, and on Wednesday, 5 May 2004, her ashes (and five years later those of her husband Gervas) were buried in the Churchyard of the Parish Church of St John the Baptist, North Cheriton. A memorial service was held at Wells Cathedral, Somerset, on Monday, 12 July 2004 and was well-attended.

== Legacy ==
The Scout Association's Betty Clay Library is located in Gilwell Park.
