= Cicely Hilda Farmer =

New Zealand-born British novelist (1870–1955)

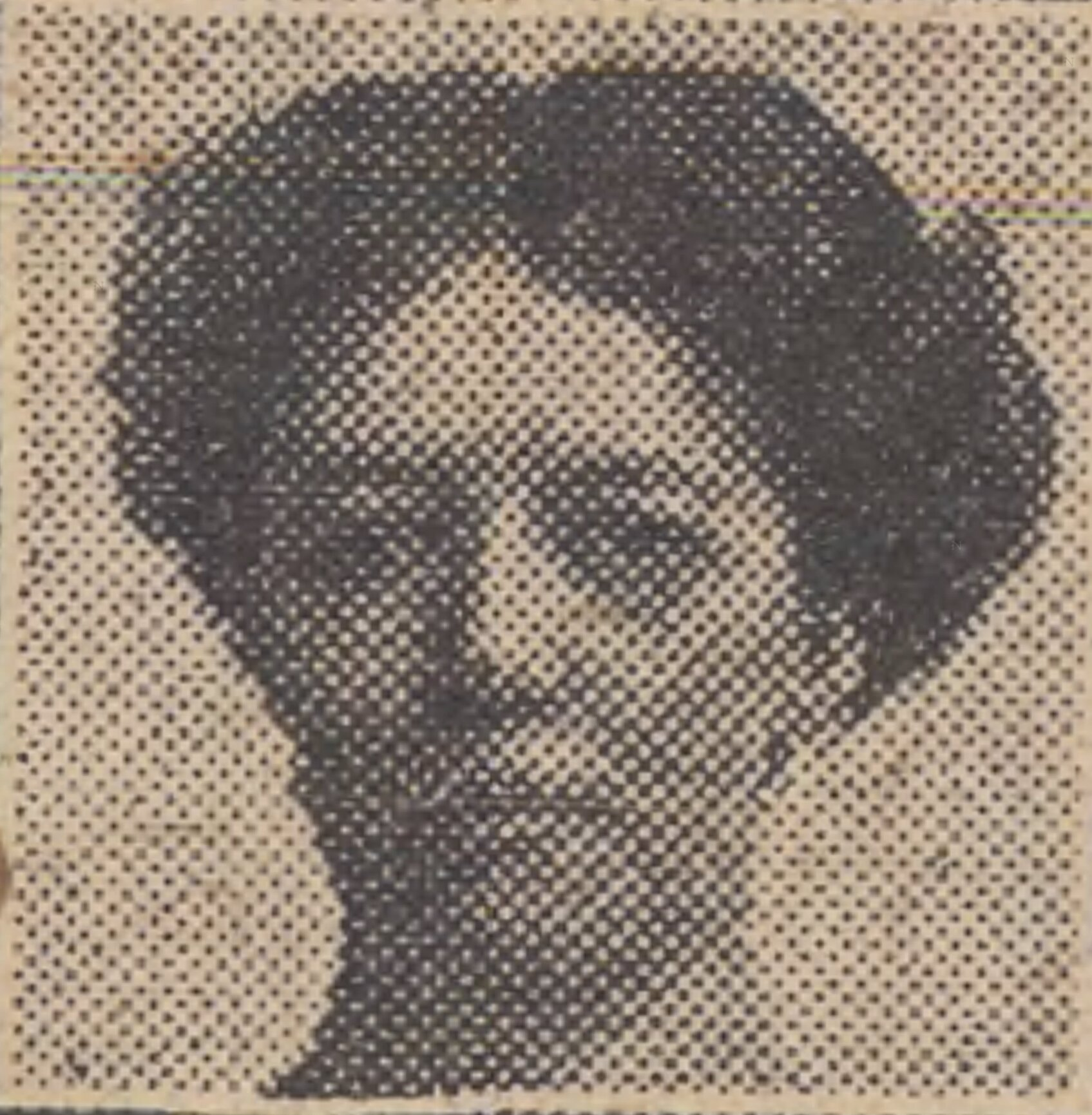
- Farmer in 1913
- Born: 1870; One Tree Hill, Auckland, New Zealand
- Died: 7 May 1955 (aged 84–85); Chelsea, London, England
- Occupation: Novelist
- Spouses: Warington Baden-Powell (m. 1913; died 1921) Montagu Monier-Williams (m. 1927; died 1931)
- Relatives: Baden Powell (father-in-law); Monier Monier-Williams (father-in-law)

Cicely Hilda Farmer (1870 – 7 May 1955) was a New Zealand-born British novelist and travel writer.

She was born in One Tree Hill, Auckland in 1870, the daughter of James and Julie Farmer.

Warington Baden-Powell, founder of the Sea Scouts, came ashore in New Zealand when his father Prof Rev Baden Powell died, and retrained there as a lawyer specialising in maritime law. He met Farmer in Auckland and they became secretly engaged in 1893. Farmer was presented at court in London as a debutant in 1893, and returned to New Zealand, where she spent much of her time until she married in 1913. She and other members of her family, however, regularly visited St Andrews, Fife, where they lived at Brownlees, a nearby farm.

20 years after becoming engaged, she married Warington Baden-Powell at All Saints Church, Knightsbridge (now the Russian Orthodox Cathedral of the Dormition of the Mother of God and All Saints) on 13 September 1913. Her wedding dress of white silk satin, made by Reville and Rossiter of Hanover Square, is in the permanent collection of the V&A in London. Also included are the train, shoes (by C. Moykopf, Burlington Arcade), stocking, gloves and a headdress of white ostrich plumes for when it was worn for a May Court in 1914.

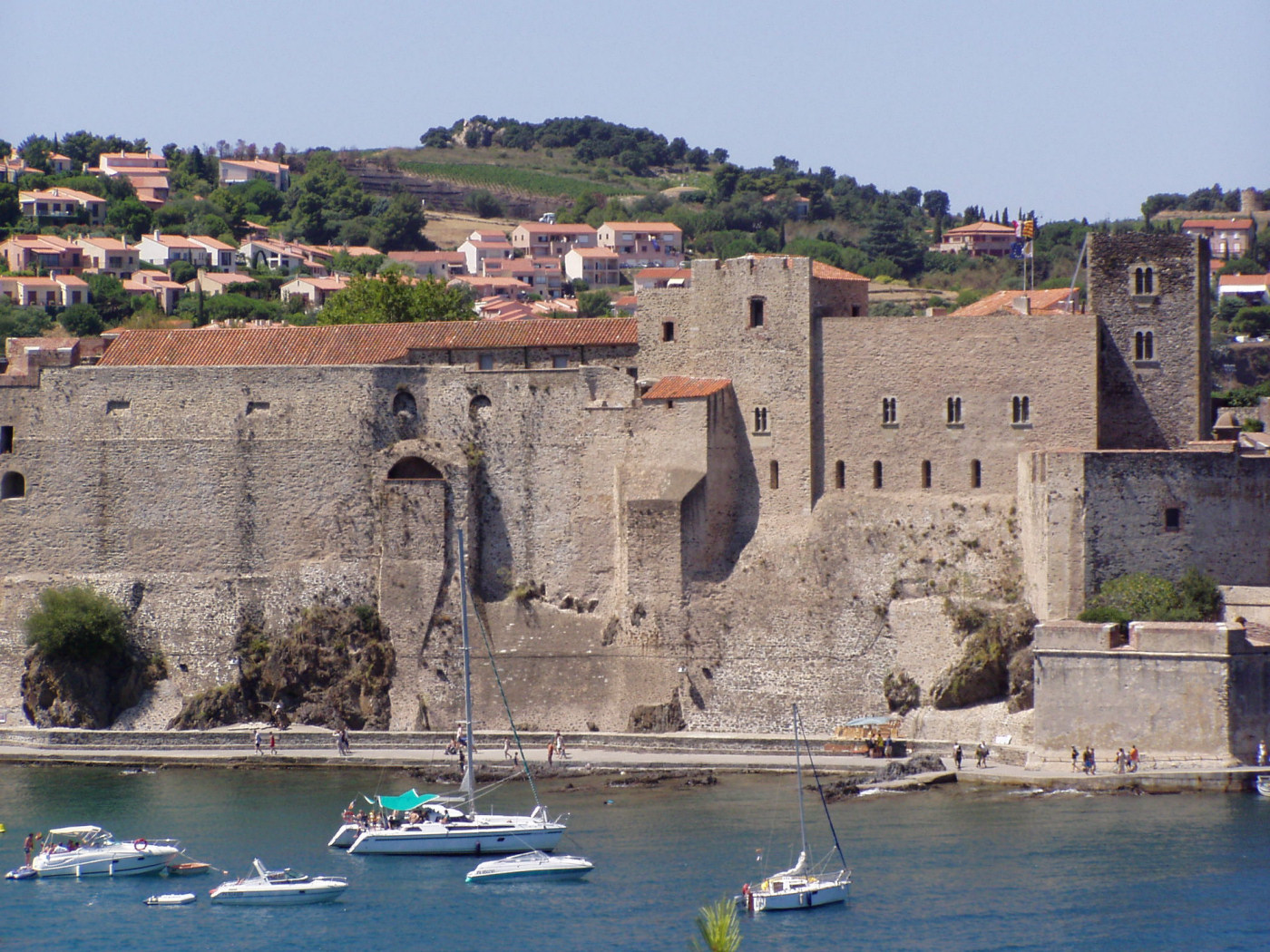
Château Royal de Collioure in 2005, her home from 1927 to 1931 was nearby

Baden-Powell died in 1921. In 1927 she married Montagu Sneade Faithfull Monier-Williams (1860–1931), British surgeon, expert figure skater and writer, a widower with two children, and the son of Monier Monier-Williams. After the wedding they retired to the anchovy fishing village of Collioure near the French Pyrenees and close to the Spanish border, where he was a keen viticulturist. They extensively renovated their house and in the 1930s the locals nicknamed it the ‘Chateau de Collioure’. Today, their former home is now the Collioure Modern Art Museum.

Artemis Weds was reviewed by The New York Times.

In 1939, by deed poll, she renounced the surname Monier-Williams and was henceforth Cicely Hilda Baden-Powell again. At the time, her address was Milden House, Dixwell Road, Folkestone, Kent.

She died in Chelsea, London on 7 May 1955, and was buried in the Farmer family plot at St Andrews Cathedral's Eastern Cemetery, St Andrews, Fife, Scotland, alongside her first husband.

== Publications ==
=== Novels ===
- The Painted Show, 1924
- Waters of Fayle, 1925
- The Bending Sickle, William Morrow, New York, 1931
- Anna, Faber and Faber, London, 1931
- Artemis Weds, William Morrow, New York, 1932, dust jacket by Paul Wenck.

=== Non-fiction ===
- Sunrise Over India, Victor Gollancz, 1914 (reprinted 1934)
- Dragons and a Bell, 1931 (about a trip through China, Malaysia, Burma, and Sri Lanka)
