= Agnes Baden-Powell =

Co-founder of the Girl Guides (1858–1945)

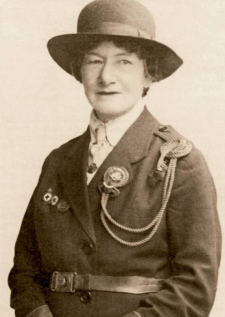
- Agnes Baden-Powell
- Born: Agnes Smyth Powell; 16 December 1858; Paddington, London, England
- Died: 2 June 1945 (aged 86)
- Resting place: Kensal Green Cemetery, London
- Parents: Baden Powell (father); Henrietta Grace Smyth (mother)
- Relatives: William Henry Smyth (maternal grandfather); Eliza Warington (maternal grandmother); Robert Baden-Powell (brother); Warington Baden-Powell (brother); George Baden-Powell (brother); Frank Baden-Powell (brother); Baden Baden-Powell (brother); Baden Henry Powell (half-brother)

Agnes Smyth Baden-Powell (16 December 1858 – 2 June 1945) was most noted for her work in establishing the Girl Guides Association with her brother Robert Baden-Powell and authoring its first handbook, How girls can help to build up the empire, published in 1912.

== Early life ==
Agnes' parents were Henrietta Grace nee Smyth, a gifted musician and artist who was the elder daughter of Admiral William Henry Smyth and his wife Annarella and Reverend Professor Baden Powell, Savilian Professor of Geometry at the University of Oxford from 1827 to 1860, who had been widowed twice previously.. Agnes was the thirteenth of her father's fourteen children and her mother's third daughter, but the elder two had died before Agnes was born. Her brothers were Warington Baden-Powell, George Baden-Powell, Robert Baden-Powell, Frank Baden-Powell, and Baden Baden-Powell.

When Agnes was only two years of age, her father died, leaving his widow with ten children to care for, the youngest only a few months old. To maintain the family connection after his death, Agnes's mother Henrietta added his first name, Baden, to their Powell surname, to be Baden-Powell. The death of Agnes's father left the family under the firm control of her mother, who was determined to instill in her children a desire to succeed.

== As an adult ==
Agnes was an accomplished musician, playing the organ, piano and violin. Her varied interests included natural history and astronomy. She kept bees, birds and butterflies in her home.

In April 1901, Agnes, by then middle-aged, became engaged to Sir William Bisset Berry, the Speaker of the South African parliament, but they did not marry and she remained a spinster for life.

For some years, she was president of the Red Cross's Westminster division. She worked for the League of Mercy and for Queen Mary's Needlework Guild.

With her younger brother, Baden, Agnes made aeronautical balloons, working the silk for the envelope. They made many flights together. Later she helped him with building and flying their own gliders and aeroplanes. Agnes was an honorary companion of the Royal Aeronautical Society from 1938.

== Girl Guides ==
Following the popularity of the Boy Scout Movement, Robert Baden-Powell organised a gathering of Boy Scouts at the Crystal Palace in London in 1909. Amongst the many thousands of Boy Scouts gathered, there were several hundred Girl Scouts present, registered as Scouts, and a small group of Girl Scouts dressed in Scout uniforms, who had arrived late and gate-crashed the event without tickets - but got the publicity.

Popular opinion at the time was against mixed activities for girls and growing pressure persuaded Robert Baden-Powell to set up a separate organisation for girls and, having been turned down by first aid societies, he approached his sister, Agnes, who reluctantly agreed to take on the organising his Girl Guides. Agnes Baden-Powell's character was useful in counteracting negative opinions of the new Girl Guides. A friend wrote of her:

Anyone who had come into touch with her gentle influence, her interest in all womanly arts, and her love of birds, insects, and flowers, would scoff at the idea of her being the president of a sort of Amazon Cadet Corps.

In late 1909, Robert Baden-Powell published "Pamphlet A: Baden-Powell Girl Guides, a Suggestion for Character Training for Girls: Organisation" and "Pamphlet B: Baden-Powell Girl Guides, a Suggestion for Character Training for Girls: Subjects of Training". These raised furious opposition in the Press.

In 1910 the The Girl Guide Association was created, with Agnes as president. By April 1910 there were 6,000 young girls registered as Girl Guides. Agnes wrote the Girl Guides' first handbook, How Girls Can Help to Build Up the Empire, published in 1912. It was partly a reworking of the Scouting for Boys book written by Robert several years earlier but with chapters added by Agnes on a number of subjects. The Girl Guide Association was incorporated in 1915. In early 1916 Agnes's brother, Robert, had his much younger wife, Olave Baden-Powell, appointed as the Girl Guides' Sussex County Commissioner and, in September 1916, the new County Commissioners voted Olave into the new post of Chief Guide, putting her in charge of The Girl Guides Association. Agnes was offered the honorary post of President which she reluctantly accepted. In 1917, Agnes was pressured to resign from the presidency in favour of Princess Mary, who was also a keen supporter of the Girl Guides. Agnes became vice-president, until her death in 1945.

== Death ==
Agnes died on 2 June 1945 in North East Surrey, having outlived all her siblings. She was buried in the family grave in Kensal Green Cemetery in London, though her name is not listed on the monument - she is still (2024) the registered owner of the grave.
