= Three Comrades (novel) =

1936 novel by Erich Maria Remarque

- First US edition, illustrated by Paul Wenck
- Author: Erich Maria Remarque
- Original title: Drei Kameraden
- Translator: A. W. Wheen
- Cover artist: Paul Wenck
- Language: Danish
- Genre: War novel
- Publisher: Little, Brown and Company (US); Hutchinson (UK)
- Publication date: December 1936 (Danish transl.)
- English publication date: 1937

Three Comrades (German: Drei Kameraden) is a 1936 novel by the German author Erich Maria Remarque. It is written in first person by the main character Robert Lohkamp, whose somewhat disillusioned outlook on life is due to his horrifying experiences in the trenches of the First World War's French–German front. He shares these experiences with Otto Köster and Gottfried Lenz, his two comrades with whom he runs an auto-repair shop in what may be late-1920s Hamburg. Remarque wrote the novel in exile and it was first published in the Danish translation; the English translation followed soon, being serialised in Good Housekeeping from January to March 1937, and in the book form later in the year. The first German language edition was published in 1938 by Amsterdam Exilliteratur publisher Querido, but the novel was only published in Germany in 1951.

== Plot ==
Protagonist Robert and "the last of the Romantics" Lenz work at an auto-shop owned by their former squad leader, Köster, alongside a non-veteran assistant named Jupp. The trio's prize possession is "Karl", a run-down van refitted into an unmatched speedster. A man named Binding attempts unsuccessfully to outrace Karl en route to a country pub, where Binding befriends Lenz and Robert falls in love with Binding's companion, Patrice Hollmann.

Robert describes the poverty and political extremism gripping Germany, being close friends with a crowd of prostitutes in his apartment building. He plays piano in the lounge for extra money in between auto-shop orders, which include repairing a Ford for a baker who got his wife killed in a car accident, and attempting to sell a Cadillac to a rich Jew. Robert bonds with Patrice at a bar, where the otherwise sober Patrice discovers a liking for rum and begins to free up from her upper-class background. They begin a relationship, meeting at a beer garden owned by fellow veteran Alfons.

Patrice unexpectedly suffers a near-fatal lung hemorrhage during a summer holiday at the sea. She names a doctor she had been seeing before her relationship with Robert, and Köster drives him over at full speed in Karl. He treats Patrice and allows the couple to return to the city, where they move into Robert's apartment; however, he schedules Patrice to leave for a sanatorium in the Swiss Alps come winter.

Work begins to dry up for the comrades, and they begin a side-business as taxi drivers, but believe they achieve a break after fighting off a rival shop crew for the rights to repair a wrecked limousine. After Patrice leaves for Switzerland, Lenz becomes involved in the city's worsening political situation and is shot by a radical from a rival party. Köster feeds the police incomplete information to ensure he can avenge Lenz himself, though he insists Robert stays out for the sake of his love. Robert, Köster, and the other veterans bury Lenz with full military honours, and the radical is instead killed by Alfons. The shop goes bankrupt after the limousine owner defaults on his repair fee, and an agent auctions off every car except Karl's.

The sanatorium reports that Patrice's health is continuing to deteriorate, and Robert and Köster gather their remaining money to pay for Robert to stay as a visitor. Köster sells Karl after driving Robert over, though they agree Patrice should not learn of either Lenz or Karl. A further diagnosis of Patrice's sickness suggests it was related to adolescent malnutrition during the war, and they resolve to make the most of their time together before Patrice's inevitable death.

== Film, TV, and theatrical adaptations ==
The novel was adapted in America as Three Comrades, a 1938 film starring Franchot Tone, Robert Taylor, Robert Young and Margaret Sullavan.

Flowers from the Victors (1999), directed by Aleksander Surin, was also based on the novel but set in Russia in the 1990s.
