= Baden Baden-Powell =

British military officer and aviation pioneer (1860–1937)

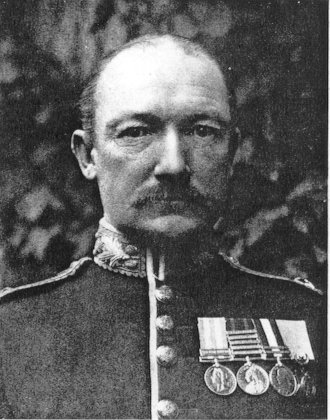
- Born: Baden Fletcher Smyth Baden-Powell; 22 May 1860; Kensington, London, England
- Died: 3 October 1937 (aged 77)
- Father: Rev. Prof. Baden Powell
- Relatives: Warington Baden-Powell (brother); George Baden-Powell (brother); Frank Baden-Powell (brother); Robert Baden-Powell (brother); Agnes Baden-Powell (sister)
- Military career
- Allegiance: United Kingdom
- Service years: 1882–1903
- Rank: Lieutenant-General (British Army)
- Unit: Scots Guards
- Conflicts: Second Boer War; Belmont (23 November 1899); Modder River (28 November 1899); Magersfontein; Siege of Mafeking

Baden Fletcher Smyth Baden-Powell (22 May 1860 – 3 October 1937) was a British military aviation pioneer, and President of the Royal Aeronautical Society from 1900 to 1907.

== Family ==
Baden was the youngest child of the Rev. Prof. Baden Powell, and the youngest brother of Warington Baden-Powell, George Baden-Powell, Frank Baden-Powell, Robert Baden-Powell and Agnes Baden-Powell.

His mother, Henrietta Grace nee Smyth, was a daughter of Admiral William Henry Smyth, and was the third wife of Rev. Prof. Baden Powell (the previous two having died). She was a gifted musician and artist, but when her husband died she was left with eight small children - Baden only three weeks old - and four older step-children, so she had to be "tough". Baden did not marry - his mother was quite brutal in trying to keep her children and herself as a family. Baden was god-father to, among others, his brother's daughter Betty Clay nee Baden-Powell.

== Military ==
Baden-Powell was commissioned a Lieutenant in the Scots Guards on 29 July 1882, and served with the Guards Camel Regiment in the Nile Expedition (1884–85) in Egypt and Sudan. Promotion to Captain followed on 5 February 1896, and to Major on 24 June 1899.

Baden-Powell was one of the first to see the use of aviation in a military context. He was a military aviation pioneer, see below.

Baden-Powell served with the 1st battalion of his regiment in South Africa during the Second Boer War, and was present at the battles of Belmont (23 November 1899), Modder River (28 November 1899), and Magersfontein (11 Dec 1899). He was in the Relief Column that in May 1900 relieved the siege of Mafeking, where his elder brother was in command. A month after the end of the war in late May 1902, Baden-Powell returned to Britain with his regiment in the SS Tagus.

In 1915, aged 55, he was a Censor at Boulogne.

== Aviation and inventions ==
Baden-Powell joined the army at 22; within a year he was lecturing on military uses of lighter-than-air flight. He was one of several notables expressing interest in the Aeronautical Navigation Conference at the 1893 World's Fair. In 1894, Baden-Powell made the first British military balloon flight. Baden-Powell wrote an article including "What will the good citizens of London say when they see a hostile dynamite-carrying aerostat hovering over St. Paul's?" He wrote to Lord Kelvin, who replied that he had "not a molecule of faith" in flight.

Baden-Powell became a Fellow of the Royal Geographical Society (elected in 1891) and a Fellow and, in 1900, President of the Royal Aeronautical Society. He also wrote, "Ballooning as a Sport", published in 1907 by William Blackwood and Sons.

With his sister Agnes, they built and flew in their own hot-air balloons, man-carrying kites, gliders and powered aircraft. He invented a twelve-foot man-carrying kite that he flew at Whitton Park, Hounslow, England, and later a three-kite system that he called the Levitor. He helped Marconi in Newfoundland in his efforts to transmit and receive radio messages across the Atlantic, using Baden-Powell's man-carrying kite to lift the radio aerial.

Baden-Powell also developed a collapsible military bicycle. He obtained one of the first British patents for a television system, "An electrical method of reproducing distant scenes visually", published 19 April 1921 (GB161706). And he contributed to the Encyclopædia Britannica entry on 'kite-flying'.

== Patents ==
- Patent GB-1903-26821
- Patent GB-1906-6443
- Patent GB-1907-9691
- Patent GB-1895-17683 Kites, Filed 23 September 1895
- Patent DE-1896-88995 Kites for lifting loads

== Bibliography ==
Books :-

- 1892: "In savage isles and settled lands. Malaysia, Australasia and Polynesia, 1888-1891", published by R.Bentley and Son, London. Among other incidents, Baden-Powell recounts a visit to Batavia (now Jakarta), where he was a guest at a dinner party hosted by a leading local magnate, Khouw Yauw Kie, Kapitein der Chinezen.
- 1903: War in practice
- 1909: Practical aerodynamics and the theory of the aeroplane. A résumé of the principles evolved by past experiments

Articles :-

- 1883, Military Ballooning
- 1887, How I learnt ballooning - Journal: Temple Bar
- 1894, On the action of a bird's wing - Journal: Aeronautics
- 1895, Air-car or man-lifting kite - Journal: National Review
- 1897, A new engine of war—Captain Baden-Powell's war kite - Journal: Daily Mail
- 1897, Conquest of the air - Journal: United Service Magazine
- 1897, New Suggestions for Aerial Exploration - Journal: Aeronautical Journal
- 1897, Present state of aeronautics - Journal: Aër. Journ.
- 1897, The conquest of the air - Journal: United Service Magazine)
- 1897, New Suggestions for Aerial Exploration
- 1898, Exploration of the Free Air - a discussion between Baden-Powell and Abbott Lawrence Rotch
- 1898, An aluminium balloon - Journal: Aër. Journ.
- 1898, Kites, their theory and practice - Journal: Scient. Amer. Suppl.
- 1898, Balloons for geographical research - Journal: Aër. Journ.
- 1898, Gliding machine (Simple title: Gliding machine, Journal: Aër. Journ.
- 1898, Kites (Simple title: Kites, Journal: Aër. Journ.
- 1898, Kites: Their theory and practice - Journal: Aër. Journ.
- 1898, Die Verwendung von Drachen zum Aufheben von Menschen [The use of kites to pick up people] - Journal: Ill. Aër. Mitt.)
- 1898, Théorie pratique des cerfs-volants - Journal: L'Aéronaute
- 1899, War kites (Simple title: War kites, - Journal: Aër. Journ.
- 1900, The secretary bird and his flight - Journal: Aër. Journ.
- 1902 Recent aeronautical progress and the future of aerial navigation - Journal: Aër. Journ.
- 1902, Recent aeronautical progress, and deductions to be drawn therefrom, regarding the future of aerial navigation - Journal: Report of the Board of Regents of the Smithsonian Institution
- 1902 Smithsonian, Recent aeronautical progress and the future of aerial navigation - Journal: Report of the Board of Regents of the Smithsonian Institution
- 1902, The war balloon in South Africa - Journal: Aër. Journ.
- 1903, Progress with airships - Journal: Report of the Board of Regents of the Smithsonian Institution
- 1903, Recent aeronautical progress, and deductions to be drawn therefrom, regarding the future of aerial navigation - Journal: Scient. Amer. Suppl.
- 1903, The future of aerial navigation - Journal: Aer. World
- 1904, Aeroplane experiments at the Crystal Palace - Journal: Aër. Journ.
- 1904, Experiments with aerial screw propellers - Journal: Aër. Journ.
- 1904, The development of the aëroplane - Journal: Aër. Journ.
- 1905, Aeronautical competitions at the St. Louis Exhibition - Journal: Aër. Journ.)
- 1905, Progress with airships in 1904 - Journal: Knowl. Illus. Scient. News
- 1906, The Gordon-Bennett race. Some technical features of the competing balloons - Journal: Aër. Journ.
- 1907, Aerial navigation - Journal: Journ. Soc. of Arts
- 1907, Ballooning as a sport
- 1907, Practical aerodynamics and the theory of aeroplanes - Journal: Knowl. Illus. Scient. News
- 1907, The exploration of the air (Simple title: The exploration of the air, Journal: Aër. Journ.)
- 1908, A trip with Wilbur Wright - Journal: Aeronautics
- 1908, Experiments with 'Dipping' planes - Journal: Aër. Journ.
- 1908, Friction of the air (Simple title: Friction of the air, Journal: Aeronautics
- 1908, Friction of the air. Skin friction a factor in aerial navigation - Journal: Scient. Amer. Suppl.
- 1908, Problem of aerial navigation; reply to Simon Newcomb - Journal: Living Age
- 1908, The problem of aerial navigation - Journal: Nineteenth Century
- 1909, Aeronautics (Simple title: Aeronautics
- 1909, Experiences with the Wright machine - Journal: Aër. Journ.
- 1909, Flight and the right to fly - Journal: Flight
- 1909, Knowledge and Illustrated Scientific News - Journal: Scientific News

== Scouting ==
Baden-Powell was the first who brought flying-based activities into Scouting in the form of kite and model aeroplane building. He can be considered the founder of Air Scouting even though he thought it was hardly feasible to have special 'Air Scouts'.

Baden-Powell was President and later District Commissioner of a North London District, was District Commissioner of Sevenoaks District, Kent between 1918 and 1935, and was Headquarters Commissioner for Aviation from 1923, until his death in 1937.

Unknown	President of the Aeronautical Society; 1902 - 1909	Succeeded by Edward Purkis Frost
