= Paul Wenck =

American illustrator

Paul Wenck (1892–1964) was a German and American painter, graphic artist and illustrator, particularly of book dust jackets.

Wenck was born in 1892 in Berlin, Germany. In 1941, he was living in New Rochelle, New York.

He is probably best known for his dust jackets designs for the Little, Brown and Company US first editions of the novels of Erich Maria Remarque, including All Quiet on the Western Front, The Road Back and Three Comrades.

He illustrated the dust jackets of Ernst Glaeser's Class of 1902 published in 1929, Cicely Hilda Farmer's Artemis Weds published in 1932, and Alfred Kreymborg's I'm No Hero published in 1933.
