= How Girls Can Help to Build Up the Empire =

Book by Agnes Baden-Powell

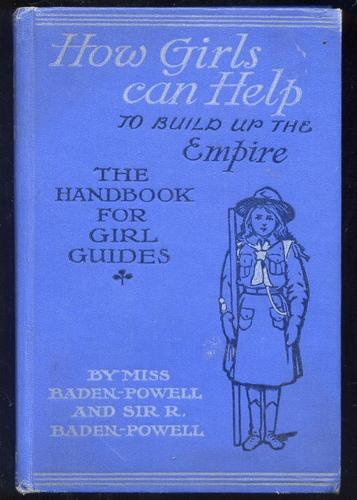
- Author: Agnes Baden-Powell; Robert Baden-Powell
- Publisher: Thomas Nelson and Sons
- Publication date: May 1912

The Handbook for Girl Guides or How Girls Can Help to Build Up the Empire is the full title of the book more commonly known as How Girls Can Help to Build up the Empire (referring to the British Empire). It was the first handbook for Girl Guides. The author was Agnes Baden-Powell in conjunction with her elder brother, then Lieutenant-General Sir Robert Baden-Powell. It was published in May 1912 by Thomas Nelson and Sons. One edition omits the word "up" from the title.

== Publication history ==
The book was a reworking of the famous Scouting for Boys. It was adapted for use by girls, although large sections remained unaltered and it included sections on stalking, tracking, signalling and camping. Several chapters on childcare, nursing and housewifery had been inserted and stories of heroic women and girls were sometimes substituted for the male ones. The book also contained the enrolment ceremony and details of the second- and first-class tests.

This book superseded Pamphlet A: Baden-Powell Girl Guides, a Suggestion for Character Training for Girls and Pamphlet B: Baden-Powell Girl Guides, a Suggestion for Character Training for Girls by the same authors. In turn it was itself replaced by Girl Guiding in 1918. Throughout the early years of Guiding, movements in different countries started publishing their own handbooks as well.

The book has been reprinted several times. In 2006, a facsimile edition of the book was available.
