= Frank Baden-Powell =

English painter

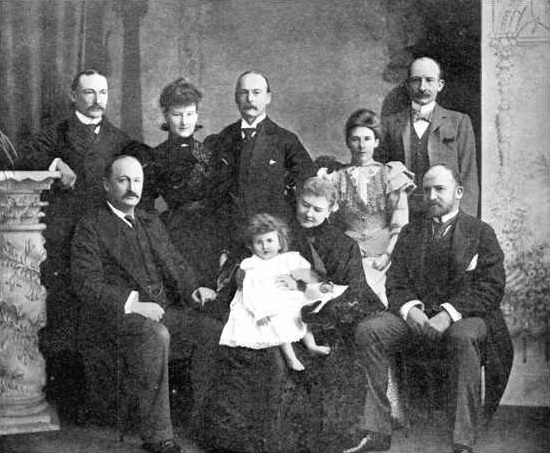
- Baden-Powell, back row, third from left, with his parents, siblings, and nephew
- Born: Francis Smyth Baden-Powell; 19 July 1850
- Died: 1933 (age 83)
- Father: Baden Powell
- Relatives: Warington, George, Robert, Baden, Agnes, Augustus, Baden Henry Powell (siblings); William Henry Smyth (maternal grandfather); Annarella Warington (maternal grandmother)

Lieutenant Francis Smyth Baden-Powell (29 July 1850 – 1933) was a British barrister, military officer and painter.

== Early life and education ==
Frank Baden-Powell was born on 29 July 1850, the third son of the Rev. Professor Baden Powell and his third wife Henrietta Grace Smyth. His maternal grandparents were Annarella Warington and William Henry Smyth. He had six full siblings — Warington, George, Robert, Baden, Agnes, and Augustus — and a half-brother, Baden Henry, from his father's second marriage. His parents, maternal grandparents, and brother Robert were all artistic, though Baden-Powell was the only one to pursue art as a career. After taking Honours at Balliol College, Oxford, Baden-Powell received a called to the Bar from the Inner Temple. He then joined the Army and was attached to the Camel Corps during the Sudan Campaign (1884-1885).

== Career ==
Baden-Powell's art appeared in exhibits around the UK, including the Royal Birmingham Society of Artists, Walker Gallery, Manchester City Art Gallery and Glasgow Institute of Fine Art, as well as The Salon in Paris. He created a commemorative diploma for the Royal Naval Exhibition of 1891 in Chelsea. In 1948, Walker Gallery held An Exhibition of Silhouette Portraits Life-size Heads by Frank Baden-Powell.

Among the art of Baden-Powell's shown at Royal Academy exhibitions, including their Royal Academy catalogue number, are:

- 1880: Bodekessel, Harz (cat. 746), On Guard (cat. 889), Crust of the Earth (cat. 1077)
- 1881: Bodethor, Hartz Mountains (cat. 693), Trafalgar refought (cat. 1412)
- 1884: Regret (sculpture; cat. 1731)
- 1888: Lieut. Baden-Powell and the Camel Corps, etc. (cat. 595)
- 1894: The Wooden Walls of Queen Victoria (892)
- 1896: The Admiral's Daughter outward bound (309), Betula-alba (1223)
- 1902: Nelson's Foudroyant wrecked on the coast of Lancashire (740)

Other artwork includes a pencil and grey wash drawing called Millais at his last Varnishing Day; oil on canvas A Quiet Backwater; Drummer Boys of the Royal Berkshire Regiment, signed and dated "War Fund 1900," watercolour highlighted with white; and the watercolour Circle of CM Powell, Shipping in a Squall, in a gilt frame.

Frank was also a Fellow of the Royal Geographical Society.

== Personal life ==
Baden-Powell married New Zealander Florence (Sidney) Watt on 28 May 1902 at St Paul's Church, Knightsbridge. Their honeymoon was a round-the-world trip. Their son Robert Harold "Bobby" was born on 11 November 1903. The family lived at 33-38 Palace Gate in Kensington between 1904 and 1911. Florence died on 17 October 1914 in London.

Baden-Powell died in Kingston upon Thames, Surrey in 1933 aged 83.
