= Three Comrades (1938 film) =

1938 film by Frank Borzage

- Original film poster
- Directed by: Frank Borzage
- Screenplay by: F. Scott Fitzgerald; Edward E. Paramore Jr.
- Based on: Three Comrades; 1937 novel by Erich Maria Remarque
- Produced by: Joseph L. Mankiewicz
- Starring: Robert Taylor; Margaret Sullavan; Franchot Tone; Robert Young
- Cinematography: Joseph Ruttenberg
- Edited by: Frank Sullivan
- Music by: Franz Waxman
- Production company: Metro-Goldwyn-Mayer
- Distributed by: Loew's Inc.
- Release date: June 2, 1938 (New York City)
- Running time: 100 minutes
- Country: United States
- Language: English
- Budget: $839,000
- Box office: $2,043,000

Three Comrades is a 1938 American drama film directed by Frank Borzage and produced by Joseph L. Mankiewicz for MGM. The screenplay was written by F. Scott Fitzgerald and Edward E. Paramore Jr., adapted from the novel Three Comrades by Erich Maria Remarque. The film stars Robert Taylor, Margaret Sullavan, Franchot Tone and Robert Young. Sullavan was nominated for the Academy Award for Best Actress.

== Plot ==
On the last day of World War I, German fighter pilots Erich Lohkamp, Otto Koster and Gottfried Lenz express fatalistic attitudes about the future. They later open an auto-repair business but are barely able to earn a living.

In the spring of 1920, while driving to a country inn, the friends meet Herr Breuer and Pat Hollmann. Pat is an aristocrat who is now impoverished, while Breuer is an older, wealthy fascist sympathizer. Although Pat is worldly, she is drawn to the innocent Erich, and they later arrange a date.

Pat and Erich begin a relationship. At the opera, they encounter Breuer, who invites them to a fancy nightclub from which Erich departs in embarrassment, ashamed of his social status. Pat convinces him that her feelings for him are stronger than any differences in status, and they realize that they are truly in love.

Gottfried tries to convince Erich to marry Pat, while Otto tries to convince Pat to marry Erich. Pat reveals to Otto that she has been ill with tuberculosis. Otto convinces her that she should still marry Erich. On their honeymoon, Pat collapses on the beach while playing with Erich, who is unaware of her illness. Erich learns of her condition and is warned that she is in grave danger of death. Otto fetches Pat's specialist Dr. Jaffe just in time to save her, but the doctor warns that she must be admitted to a sanitarium by October.

Through the summer, Otto, Erich, Gottfried and Pat are happy together, even though they worry about her health. Gottfried is torn between his devotion to his friends and his belief in the teachings of political pacifist Dr. Becker. On the day that Pat must leave for the sanitarium, a thug kills Gottfried while trying to slay Dr. Becker. Erich and Otto sell their shop and spend the next months searching for the killer. At Christmas, Otto finally finds the murderer, trailing him to a church and killing him in a shootout.

Erich learns that Pat must have an operation to collapse her lung. Her doctor warns her that during her recovery, Pat must remain bedridden and completely still for two weeks or risk death. Although the operation will cost more than 1,000 marks, Erich tells the doctor to proceed while Otto sells his car to pay for it. When Otto visits Pat after the operation, she implores him to stop making sacrifices on her behalf, as her need for future care will be endless and expensive. Otto encourages her to live for Erich. Pat speaks to Erich and expresses her desire to escape to Rio right away with Erich and Otto. Erich beseeches her to focus on her recovery. When alone, Pat walks to the balcony, a simple movement that she knows will cause her death. Erich watches from below as she collapses. He rushes to her side just in time to hear her final words of love.

After Pat's funeral, as they hear fighting between fascists and protesters, Otto and Erich decide to move to South America. As they leave the cemetery, the spirits of Gottfried and Pat are walking beside them.

== Cast ==
- Robert Taylor as Erich Lohkamp
- Margaret Sullavan as Patricia Hollmann
- Franchot Tone as Otto Koster
- Robert Young as Gottfried Lenz
- Guy Kibbee as Alfons
- Lionel Atwill as Breuer
- Henry Hull as Dr. Becker
- Charley Grapewin as Local Doctor
- Monty Woolley as Dr. Jaffe

== Reception ==
In a contemporary review for The New York Times, critic Frank S. Nugent called Three Comrades "a beautiful and memorable film" and wrote: "Faithful to the spirit and, largely, to the letter of the novel, it has been magnificently directed, eloquently written, and admirably played. And in Margaret Sullavan's case, the word 'admirably' is sheer understatement. Hers is a shimmering, almost unendurably lovely performance. ... It is a superlatively fine picture, obviously one of 1938's best ten, and not one to be missed."

According to MGM records, the film earned $1,193,000 in the United States and Canada and $850,000 elsewhere, resulting in a profit of $472,000.

The film was nominated for the American Film Institute's 2002 list AFI's 100 Years...100 Passions.
