= Michael Baden-Powell, 4th Baron Baden-Powell =

Rhodesian-Australian insurance agent (1940–2023)

The Right Honourable The Lord Baden-Powell
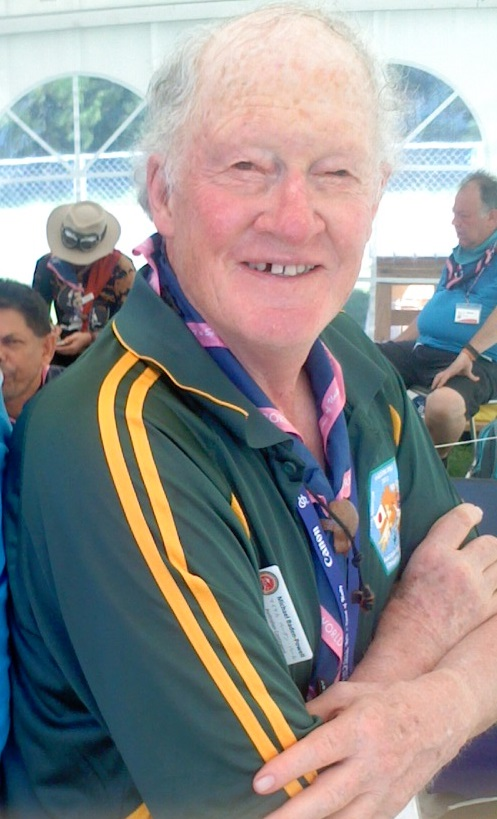
- Baden-Powell in 2015
- Born: David Michael Baden-Powell; 11 December 1940; Sinoia, Southern Rhodesia (now Chinhoyi, Zimbabwe)
- Died: 3 July 2023 (aged 82); Australia
- Occupation: Insurance agent
- Spouse: Joan Phillips Berryman (m. 1966)
- Children: 3, including David
- Father: Peter Baden-Powell, 2nd Baron Baden-Powell

David Michael Baden-Powell, 4th Baron Baden-Powell (11 December 1940 – 3 July 2023) was a British life insurance sales agent and an active supporter of the Scout Movement.

Baden-Powell was the second son of Peter Baden-Powell, 2nd Baron Baden-Powell, and Carine Boardman and inherited the barony following the death of his elder brother Robert in 2019. He was a grandson of Robert Baden-Powell, and Olave Baden-Powell and a great-grandson of the mathematician Baden Powell.

== Early life ==
Michael Baden-Powell was born in Sinoia, Southern Rhodesia (now Zimbabwe), the second son of Peter Baden-Powell, later 2nd Baron Baden-Powell, and Carine Crause-Boardman. After his father inherited the peerage, the family moved from Rhodesia to Britain in 1947. He was educated at Pierrepont School, Frensham, England. He worked for Fairey Aviation as a trainee engineer until April 1964, when he migrated to Australia, where he initially worked as a draftsman and eventually became an AMP insurance sales agent.

== Scouting and freemasonry ==
Baden-Powell had been a Scout Leader in Britain before moving to Australia. He was heavily involved with Scouts Victoria, holding the position of State Commissioner - Special Duties. He had held a wide range of other positions in the organisation, including membership of associated philanthropic bodies such as the World Scout Foundation and Victorian Scout Foundation. He was also a Freemason and past Master of Baden-Powell Lodge No. 488 in Melbourne, Victoria, a Masonic Lodge founded in 1930, the first named after his grandfather, who donated the Volume of Sacred Law in 1931.

== "JamRoll" ==
In 1929, a Rolls-Royce car and an Eccles brand caravan were presented to his grandparents during the 3rd World Scout Jamboree. It was bought from money raised from Scouts world-wide who were invited to give just a penny towards the purchase. At that time, a common treat when out was to buy a small "swiss roll" filled with jam, that cost a penny, and was marketed as "a penny jam roll", so B-P called the car "Jam Roll", a happy coincidence of the penny contributions, the association, and from Jamboree and Rolls-Royce. The car was sold in 1945. With John Ineson, Tony Harvey and Stephen Hilditch, Baden-Powell established a charitable company, B-P Jam Roll Ltd., which obtained a loan and purchased the car; funds were raised to repay the loan. The car and caravan were reunited in 2007, during the 21st World Scout Jamboree after the car and its owner had been found by The Scout Association's archivist, Paul Moynihan, who made a proposal to purchase it.

Baden-Powell was also a member of the Victorian Branch of the National Australia Day Council.

== Personal life and death ==
Baden-Powell married Joan Phillips Berryman, daughter of Horace William Berryman, on 20 August 1966. They had three sons -

- David Baden-Powell, 5th Baron Baden-Powell
- Alex Baden-Powell
- Myles Baden-Powell

Baden-Powell lived in Melbourne, Australia, and died on 3 July 2023, at the age of 82. The title passed to his eldest son, David, who is also a member of Scouts Australia.

== Awards ==
- The Scout Association of Australia's 50-Year Service Award,
- Scouts Australia's Silver Kangaroo Award
- Scout Association of Malaysia's order of the Green Forest
- Scout Association of Japan's Golden Pheasant and Medal of Merit
- Girl Guides Association of Malaysia's Medal of Merit.
- Guides Australia's Thanks Badge, 2007.
- Boy Scouts of America's Daniel Carter Beard Masonic Scouter's Award, 2007.

== Coat-of-Arms ==
Coat of arms of Michael Baden-Powell, 4th Baron Baden-Powell
Adopted 1929 Coronet Coronet of a baron. Crest 1st: a Lion passant Or in the paw a broken Tilting Spear in bend proper pendent therefrom by a Riband Gules an Escutcheon resting on a Wreath Sable charged with a Pheon Or (Powell); 2nd: out of a Crown Vallary Or a Demi Lion rampant Gules on the head a like Crown charged on the shoulders with a Cross Patée Argent and supporting with the paws a Sword Erect proper Pommel and Hilt Gold (Baden). Escutcheon Quarterly: 1 and 4th, Per fess Or and Argent a Lion rampant gules between two Tilting Spears erect proper (Powell); 2nd and 3rd, Argent a Lion rampant proper on the head a Crown Vallary Or between four Crosses Patée Gules and as many Fleur-de-lis Azure alternately (Baden). Supporters Dexter: an Officer of 13th/18th Hussars in full dress his Sword drawn over his shoulder proper; sinister: a Boy Scout holding a Staff also proper. Motto Ar Nyd Yw Pwyll Pyd Yw (Where there is steadiness, there will be a Powell).

Peerage of the United Kingdom
Preceded by Robert Baden-Powell	Baron Baden-Powell; 2019–2023	Succeeded by David Baden-Powell
