= Baden Powell (footballer) =

English footballer

Personal information
- Date of birth: 17 June 1931
- Place of birth: Hebburn, England
- Date of death: January 2014 (aged 82)
- Place of death: Sunderland, England
- Position: Right winger

Youth career
- Newcastle United

Senior career*
Years	Team	Apps	(Gls)
- South Shields
1950–1954	Darlington	9	(0)
1954–1962	South Shields		
1962–1963	Horden Colliery Welfare		
- * Club domestic league appearances and goals

Baden Powell (17 June 1931 – January 2014) was an English footballer who played as a right winger in the Football League for Darlington. He was on the books of Newcastle United, without playing for their league team, and also played for South Shields and Horden Colliery Welfare. He was born in Hebburn in 1931 and died in January 2014 at the age of 82.
