= Baron Baden-Powell =

Barony in the Peerage of the United Kingdom

Barony of Baden-Powell
- Creation date: 1929
- Created by: King George V
- Peerage: Peerage of the United Kingdom
- First holder: Sir Robert Baden-Powell, Bt
- Present holder: David Baden-Powell, 5th Baron Baden-Powell
- Remainder to: Heirs male of the body of the grantee
- Subsidiary titles: Baronet of Bentley

Baron Baden-Powell, of Gilwell in the County of Essex, is a title in the Peerage of the United Kingdom created in 1929 for Lieutenant-General Sir Robert Baden-Powell, 1st Baronet. He had been created baronet, of Bentley, in the Baronetage of the United Kingdom on 4 December 1922.

== Baden-Powell baronets, of Bentley (1922) ==
- Sir Robert Stephenson Smyth Baden-Powell, 1st Baronet (1922–1941) (created Baron Baden-Powell in 1929)

== Barons Baden-Powell (1929) ==
- Robert Stephenson Smyth Baden-Powell, 1st Baron Baden-Powell (1857–1941)
- Arthur Robert Peter Baden-Powell, 2nd Baron Baden-Powell (1913–1962)
- Robert Crause Baden-Powell, 3rd Baron Baden-Powell (1936–2019)
- Michael Baden-Powell, 4th Baron Baden-Powell (1940–2023)

== Arms ==
Coat of arms of Baron Baden-Powell
Adopted 1929 Coronet Coronet of a baron. Crest 1st: a Lion passant Or in the paw a broken Tilting Spear in bend proper pendent therefrom by a Riband Gules an Escutcheon resting on a Wreath Sable charged with a Pheon Or (Powell); 2nd: out of a Crown Vallary Or a Demi Lion rampant Gules on the head a like Crown charged on the shoulders with a Cross Patée Argent and supporting with the paws a Sword Erect proper Pommel and Hilt Gold (Baden). Escutcheon Quarterly: 1st and 4th, Per fess Or and Argent a Lion rampant gules between two Tilting Spears erect proper (Powell); 2nd and 3rd, Argent a Lion rampant proper on the head a Crown Vallary Or between four Crosses Patée Gules and as many Fleur-de-lis Azure alternately (Baden). Supporters Dexter: an Officer of 13th/18th Hussars in full dress his Sword drawn over his shoulder proper; sinister: a Boy Scout holding a Staff also proper. Motto Ar Nyd Yw Pwyll Pyd Yw (Where there is steadiness, there will be a Powell).
