= Peter Baden-Powell, 2nd Baron Baden-Powell =

British Baron (1913–1962)

The Right Honourable The Lord Baden-Powell
- Lord Baden-Powell in 1952
- Born: Arthur Robert Peter Baden-Powell; 30 October 1913; Ewhurst, East Sussex, England
- Died: 9 December 1962 (aged 49); London, England
- Spouse: Carine Crause Boardman (m. 1936)
- Children: Robert Baden-Powell, 3rd Baron Baden-Powell; Michael Baden-Powell, 4th Baron Baden-Powell; Dawn Baden-Powell; Wendy Dorothy Baden-Powell
- Parent(s): Robert Baden-Powell, 1st Baron Baden-Powell; Olave St Clair Soames

Arthur Robert Peter Baden-Powell, 2nd Baron Baden-Powell, FRSA (known as Peter; 30 October 1913 – 9 December 1962) was the son of Lieutenant-General Robert Baden-Powell, 1st Baron Baden-Powell, the founder of Scouting, and Olave St. Clair Soames. He served for two years in the British South Africa Police in Southern Rhodesia and then in the Southern Rhodesian Civil Service until the end of the Second World War, when he returned to Britain to assume his title and became a director of companies, and a Special Constable with the City of London Police.

== Family life and work ==
He was born in England, the son of Lieutenant-General Sir Robert Baden-Powell and Olave St. Clair Soames. He attended Dane Court preparatory school in Pyrford and then followed in his father's footsteps to Charterhouse School, Godalming, Surrey. He entered the Royal Military College, Sandhurst but did not complete the course. He served in the British South Africa Police (BSAP) in Southern Rhodesia from 1934 to 1937. He married Carine Crause Boardman (1913 – 14 May 1993), a nurse from Johannesburg, South Africa, on 3 January 1936. Marriage was forbidden by the BSAP terms of service, so he transferred to the Southern Rhodesia Native Affairs Department in 1937.

They had two sons and two daughters:

- Robert Crause Baden-Powell, 3rd Baron Baden-Powell (1936−2019)
- David Michael Baden-Powell, 4th Baron Baden-Powell (1940−2023)
- Dawn Baden-Powell (born and died 1942 in Southern Rhodesia)
- Wendy Dorothy Baden-Powell (born 16 September 1944), unmarried, living in Melbourne, Australia.

His father died in 1941, so he inherited the peerage, and in 1945 he left the Southern Rhodesia Government and returned to England for eighteen months, and then permanently in 1949. He became a company director and a special constable with the City of London Police, and took his seat in the House of Lords

He died on 9 December 1962, aged 49, in St Thomas' Hospital, London. Already suffering leukaemia, he spent a night in his parents' 1929 caravan in wet and cold conditions at a Gilwell re-union in September 1962 and caught a cold, which subsequently turned to pneumonia, then pleurisy, which led to a fatal heart attack.

== Later career ==
He was named Arthur after his mother's brother, Robert after his father, and Peter after the eponymous character of the play Peter Pan by James Barrie, of whom his father was a fan (likewise, he named his daughter Wendy after another character in the play).

He was:

- 1948 - elected a member of the Mercers' Company.
- a Fellow of the Royal Society of Arts (R.S.A.).
- involved in Scouting.
- Guildmaster of The B–P Guild of Old Scouts, until his death.

In May 1952 he visited Poole, Dorset and opened the new hall of the 1st Hamworthy Scouts' who had been started by some boys from his father's 1907 Brownsea Island experimental camp. He played his father in a pageant on the history of Scouting at the 50th Anniversary World Scout Jamboree at Sutton Coldfield in 1957. He was awarded:

- 1957 - Austrian Scouting's Silbernen Steinbock (am rot-weiß-roten Band)
- 1957 - Scout Association of Japan's Golden Pheasant Award.

== Arms ==
Coat of arms of Peter Baden-Powell, 2nd Baron Baden-Powell
Adopted 1929 Coronet Coronet of a baron. Crest 1st: a Lion passant Or in the paw a broken Tilting Spear in bend proper pendent therefrom by a Riband Gules an Escutcheon resting on a Wreath Sable charged with a Pheon Or (Powell); 2nd: out of a Crown Vallary Or a Demi Lion rampant Gules on the head a like Crown charged on the shoulders with a Cross Patée Argent and supporting with the paws a Sword Erect proper Pommel and Hilt Gold (Baden). Escutcheon Quarterly: 1 and 4th, Per fess Or and Argent a Lion rampant gules between two Tilting Spears erect proper (Powell); 2nd and 3rd, Argent a Lion rampant proper on the head a Crown Vallary Or between four Crosses Patée Gules and as many Fleur-de-lis Azure alternately (Baden). Supporters Dexter: an Officer of 13th/18th Hussars in full dress his Sword drawn over his shoulder proper; sinister: a Boy Scout holding a Staff also proper. Motto Ar Nyd Yw Pwyll Pyd Yw (Where there is steadiness, there will be a Powell).

== Ancestry ==
Ancestors of Peter Baden-Powell, 2nd Baron Baden-Powell

8. Baden Powell
4. Baden Powell
9. Hester Powell
2. Robert Baden-Powell, 1st Baron Baden-Powell
10. William Henry Smyth
5. Henrietta Grace Smyth
11. Eliza Anne "Annarella" Warington
1. Peter Baden-Powell, 2nd Baron Baden-Powell
12. Arthur Soames
6. Harold Soames
13. Anna Amelia Gilstrap
3. Olave Soames
14. George Hill
7. Katharine Mary (Mona) Hill
15. Georgina Marian Wilkins

Peerage of the United Kingdom
Preceded by Robert Stephenson Smyth Baden-Powell	Baron Baden-Powell; 1941–1962	Succeeded by Robert Crause Baden-Powell
