= Robert Baden-Powell, 3rd Baron Baden-Powell =

British Baron and Scouting leader

The Right Honourable The Lord Baden-Powell
- Born: 15 October 1936; Johannesburg, South Africa
- Died: 28 December 2019 (aged 83); Surrey, England, United Kingdom
- Spouse: Patience Hélène Mary Batty (m. 1963; died 2010)
- Father: Peter Baden-Powell, 2nd Baron Baden-Powell

Robert Crause Baden-Powell, 3rd Baron Baden-Powell (15 October 1936 – 28 December 2019) was the elder son of Carine Boardman and Peter Baden-Powell, 2nd Baron Baden-Powell, and a grandson of Robert Baden-Powell, 1st Baron Baden-Powell, and Olave Baden-Powell.

== Family and personal life ==
Baden-Powell was born in Johannesburg, Union of South Africa, the elder son of Peter Baden-Powell, later 2nd Baron Baden-Powell, and Carine Boardman of Johannesburg, and lived in Southern Rhodesia (now Zimbabwe). After his father inherited the peerage, the family moved from Rhodesia to Britain in 1949, when he was 12. He was educated at Bryanston School and played viola in the school orchestra.

On 1 August 1963, he married Patience Hélène Mary Batty (27 October 1936 – 18 December 2010), only daughter of Major Douglas Myers Batty, of Melsetter, Southern Rhodesia and Elsie May Loker. They subsequently realized that they had been at primary school together in Southern Rhodesia.

Baden-Powell enjoyed swimming, fishing, model making, gardening, bee keeping, badminton and music and kept and bred American Quarter Horses. He died, childless, at home in the early hours of Saturday, 28 December 2019, after a long battle with cancer, and his title was inherited by his brother, Michael.

== Career ==
He did National Service in the Royal Navy, became a leading seaman, and during the Suez Crisis, served on HMS Bulwark. He then set up a liquor business in Nottingham called "Whisky a Gogo" and spent time as a motor car salesman, wine merchant and public relations officer with the BBC. From 1964 to 1984, he was a local authority finance broker in the City of London. He held several directorships:

- Founder and chairman, London and Cheshire Insurance Company (1961–1966) (company collapsed 1966)
- Director, City Share Trust (1964–1970)
- Director, Bolton Building Society (1974–1988)
- Managing Director, Fieldguard Limited (family private company) from 1984 until his death.
- Director, London board of the Cheltenham & Gloucester Building Society.
- Director of a number of unit trusts (now part of F&C) and of other companies.

== Scouting & community organisations ==
He participated in Scouting:

- 1946 – became Wolf Cub in Southern Rhodesia
- 1959–1962 – Assistant Scout Leader, 100th Nottingham Group
- 1965–1969 – Group Scout Leader and Venture Scout Leader, 6th Putney Group
- leader – Ripley Venture Scout Unit

The Scout Association positions:

- 1968–1982 – Chief Scout's commissioner
- 1972–1988 – president of West Yorkshire Scout Council
- 1972–1978 – member of the committee of council (now board of trustees)
- 1973–1981 – member of the general purposes sub-committee (1973–1981)
- 1973 – The Scout Association's delegation leader at the World Scout Conference in Nairobi
- The Scout Association's delegation member at two other World Scout Conferences
- 1975 – British contingent leader 14th World Scout Jamboree at Lillehammer, Norway
- 1977, 1981 and 1983 – deputy camp chief at two Canadian Scout Jamborees and 15th World Scout Jamboree in Canada
- 1981–2019 – vice-president (1981–2019)

He received:

- The Scout Association's Silver Acorn and Silver Wolf
- Scouts Canada's Silver Fox, 1983.
- World Organization of the Scout Movement's (Bronze Wolf), 1983

He was:

- President, Surrey Council for Voluntary Youth Services, 2010–2019
- President, Camping and Caravanning Club, 1992–2002 and vice president, 2002–2019
- President, Camping and Caravanning Club, 1991–2002
- Member, various Quarter Horse bodies, 1983–1991 and established Quarter Horse racing in the UK, chairman of Quarter Horse Racing UK (1985–1988), member of the British Quarter Horse Association, 1984–1989, and Chairman in 1990
- Governor, Glenesk School, 1986–2005
- Surrey Rural Housing Committee, 1985–1990
- Chairman, Sheldon Grange Housing Association.
- Ripley, Surrey, Parish Council, 1977–1986
- Liveryman of the Worshipful Company of Mercers, of which his grandfather had been master.

== Wife ==
Upon marriage, his wife became Lady Baden-Powell and served with many charities, including the YWCA, Girls Alone in London, the National Playbus Association, NSPCC, Commonwealth Youth Exchange Council, SPCK, Surrey Council for Voluntary Youth Services, Surrey Antiques Fair, Walton Firs Camp Site, as well as various local and national offices of the Girl Guides, for which she became Commonwealth Chief Commissioner and, latterly, a vice-president. She was a Vice-President of the Scout Association. She also conducted a successful business life and was a director of Imperial Life of Canada, Surrey Radio, and Fieldguard Limited (a family private company). She was appointed a CBE for her services to youth and was a Deputy Lord Lieutenant for Surrey. She died of motor neuron disease in 2010.

== Arms ==
Coat of arms of Robert Baden-Powell, 3rd Baron Baden-Powell
Adopted 1929 Coronet Coronet of a baron. Crest 1st: a Lion passant Or in the paw a broken Tilting Spear in bend proper pendent therefrom by a Riband Gules an Escutcheon resting on a Wreath Sable charged with a Pheon Or (Powell); 2nd: out of a Crown Vallary Or a Demi Lion rampant Gules on the head a like Crown charged on the shoulders with a Cross Patée Argent and supporting with the paws a Sword Erect proper Pommel and Hilt Gold (Baden). Escutcheon Quarterly: 1 and 4th, Per fess Or and Argent a Lion rampant gules between two Tilting Spears erect proper (Powell); 2nd and 3rd, Argent a Lion rampant proper on the head a Crown Vallary Or between four Crosses Patée Gules and as many Fleur-de-lis Azure alternately (Baden). Supporters Dexter: an Officer of 13th/18th Hussars in full dress his Sword drawn over his shoulder proper; sinister: a Boy Scout holding a Staff also proper. Motto Ar Nyd Yw Pwyll Pyd Yw (Where there is steadiness, there will be a Powell).

Peerage of the United Kingdom
Preceded by Peter Baden-Powell	Baron Baden-Powell; 1962–2019	Succeeded by Michael Baden-Powell
