= Baden Henry Powell =

British civil servant in India

- Born: 23 August 1841; Oxford, England
- Died: 2 January 1901 (aged 59); Oxford, England
- Education: St Paul's School, London
- Parent(s): Baden Powell; Charlotte Pope

Baden Henry Powell, latterly (by the 1891 census if not before) known as Baden Henry Baden-Powell, CIE FRSE (23 August 1841 - 2 January 1901), was an English civil servant in Bengal who served as a conservator of forests in Punjab and as a Chief Court Judge. He became an Additional Commissioner at Lahore and was made Companion of the Order of the Indian Empire in 1883. He wrote on a variety of topics including land tenure, forest conservation and law.

== Life ==
Baden Henry Powell was the second child and the eldest son of the Reverend Professor Baden Powell by his second wife, Charlotte Pope, who died on 14 October 1844. His parents were married on 27 September 1837.

Powell was educated at St Paul's School, London from 1856. He joined the Indian Civil Service in 1860. He was appointed Conservator of Forests, for the Punjab after the death of Dr John Lindsay Stewart in 1873.

In 1874, he was elected a Fellow of the Royal Society of Edinburgh. His proposers included William Jameson, Hugh Cleghorn, and John Hutton Balfour.

In 1886 he became the Chief Court Judge for Lahore, serving until 1889. He became the vice-chancellor of the University of the Punjab.

Powell was artistic, like his half-brother, Frank Baden-Powell, and many others in the family. Several watercolours and a collection of drawings, titled An Album of Views of India including Ceylon, the Himalayas, Agra, Benares, Barrackpore, Calcutta and Chandranagore and a number of views of the Middle East with drawings from September 1861 to 26 October 1869, have been sold at auctions.

== Books ==
Powell was a writer upon Indian law and land tenure and his works include:

- Administration of land revenue & tenure in British India
- Hand-book of the economic products of the Punjab, with a combined index and glossary of technical vernacular words ... Prepared under the orders of government. 1868
- Punjab. Forest Department [from old catalog] District and canal arboriculture, 1876-7.
- A Manual of the Land Revenue System and Land Tenures of British India, 1882
- A manual of jurisprudence for forest officers (1882)
- Land-systems of British India; being a manual of the land-tenures and of the systems of land-revenue administration prevalent in the several provinces. Oxford, Clarendon Press, 1892. Volume 1 Volume 2 Volume 3
- Indian village community : examined with reference to the physical, ethnographic, and historical conditions of the provinces ... 1896
- Origin and growth of village communities in India. London, S. Sonnenschein; New York, Scribner, 1899 (first edition).

He was made a Companion of the Order of the Indian Empire (CIE) in 1883, and retired in 1889.

Powell died on 2 January 1901 at age 59; he did not marry, nor have issue. His remains lie in St Sepulchre's Cemetery, Oxford.
