= George Baden-Powell =

British politician and author

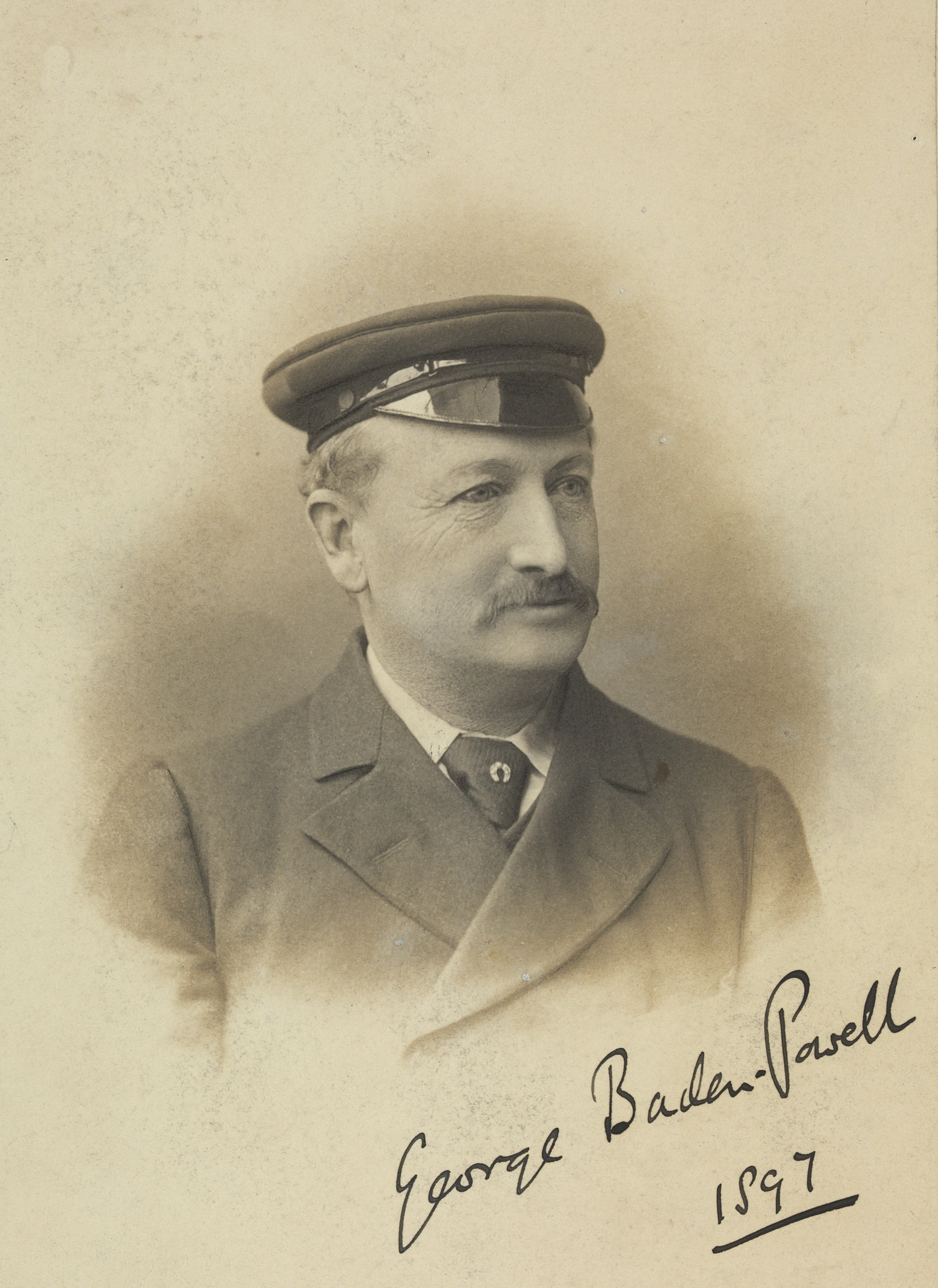
George Baden-Powell

Sir George Smyth Baden-Powell, KCMG (24 December 1847 – 20 November 1898), was a son of the mathematician Baden Powell. He served as a commissioner in Victoria, Australia, the West Indies, Malta and Canada.

== Birth ==
His father was the Reverend Professor Baden Powell, who held the Savilian Chair of Geometry at the University of Oxford from 1827 to 1860.

His mother, Henrietta Grace, was the third wife of Baden Powell (the previous two having died). She was the elder daughter of William Henry Smyth and his wife Annarella.

== Education ==
He was educated at St Paul's School, London, and at Marlborough College. He went on to Balliol College, Oxford in 1871, and the Inner Temple in 1876.

== Career ==
He was appointed a Fellow of the Royal Society (F.R.S.). He was an author on political, financial and colonial topics. He was Conservative MP for Liverpool Kirkdale from 1885 to 1898.

== Honours ==
He was appointed Companion, Order of St. Michael and St. George (C.M.G.) in 1884. He held the office of Member of Parliament (M.P.) (Conservative) for Liverpool, Kirkdale Division between 1885 and 1898. He was appointed Knight Commander, Order of St. Michael and St. George (K.C.M.G.) in 1888.

== Family ==
On 8 April 1893 in Cheltenham George married Frances, daughter of Charles Wilson, of Cheltenham, Gloucestershire. They had a daughter, Maud Kirkdale Baden-Powell (27 July 1895 – 6 Dec 1981), and a son, Donald Ferlys Wilson Baden-Powell (1897–1973). Frances died aged 50 in Cheltenham on 29 Oct 1913.

== Exploration ==
In 1896 he took his yacht Otaria to the island of Novaya Zemlya in the Arctic to observe that year's total solar eclipse. On his return to Vardø, Norway, he met his friend Fritjof Nansen who had just returned from his three-year drift and trek across the Arctic. George, having intended to start a search for Nansen, put his yacht at Nansen's disposal to search for Nansen's ship, the Fram, but they had only reached Hammerfest (300 miles West along the Northern Norwegian coast) when the news reached them that the Fram had also arrived back in Norway.

== Publications ==
- George Baden-Powell (1872), New Homes for the Old Country
- George Baden-Powell (1882), State Aid and State Interference
- George Baden-Powell, ed. (1888), The Truth about Home Rule, W. Blackwood

Parliament of the United Kingdom
New constituency	Member of Parliament for Liverpool Kirkdale; 1885 – 1898	Succeeded by David MacIver
