= Baden Powell (mathematician) =

English mathematician and priest

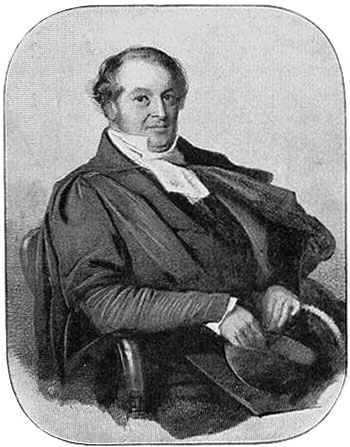
- Born: 22 August 1796; Stamford Hill, Hackney, London, England
- Died: 11 June 1860 (aged 63); Kensington, London, England
- Spouses: Eliza Rivaz; Charlotte Pope; Henrietta Grace Smyth
- Children: Baden; Warington; George; Frank; Robert; Agnes; Baden

Baden Powell, MA FRS FRGS (22 August 1796 – 11 June 1860) was an English mathematician and Church of England priest. He held the Savilian Chair of Geometry at the University of Oxford from 1827 to 1860. Powell was a prominent liberal theologian who put forward advanced ideas about evolution.

== Origins ==
Baden Powell II was born at Stamford Hill, Hackney in London. His father, Baden Powell I (1767–1841), of Langton and Speldhurst in Kent, was a wine merchant, who served as High Sheriff of Kent in 1831, and as Master of the Worshipful Company of Mercers in 1822. The mother of Baden Powell II was Hester Powell (1776–1848), his father's paternal first cousin, a daughter of James Powell (1737–1824) of Clapton, Hackney, Middlesex, Master of the Worshipful Company of Salters in 1818.

The Powell family can be traced back to the early 16th century, where they were yeomen farmers at Mildenhall in Suffolk. Baden Powell's great-grandfather, David Powell (1725–1810) of Homerton, Middlesex, a second son, migrated to the City of London aged 17 in 1712, subsequently going into business as a merchant at Old Broad Street and buying the manor of Wattisfield in Suffolk. In 1740 a branch of the family bought the Whitefriars Glass works.

The name Baden originated in Susanna Baden (1663–1737), the maternal grandmother of David Powell (1725–1810) of Homerton, Middlesex, and one of the ten children of Andrew Baden (1637–1716), a Mercer who served as Mayor of Salisbury in 1682.

== Education ==
Powell was admitted as an undergraduate at Oriel College, Oxford in 1814, and graduated with a first-class honours degree in mathematics in 1817.

== Ordination ==
Powell was ordained as a priest of the Church of England in 1821, having served as curate of Midhurst, Sussex. His first living was as Vicar of Plumstead, Kent, of which the advowson was owned by his family. He immediately began his scientific work there, starting with experiments on radiant heat.

== Marriages and children ==
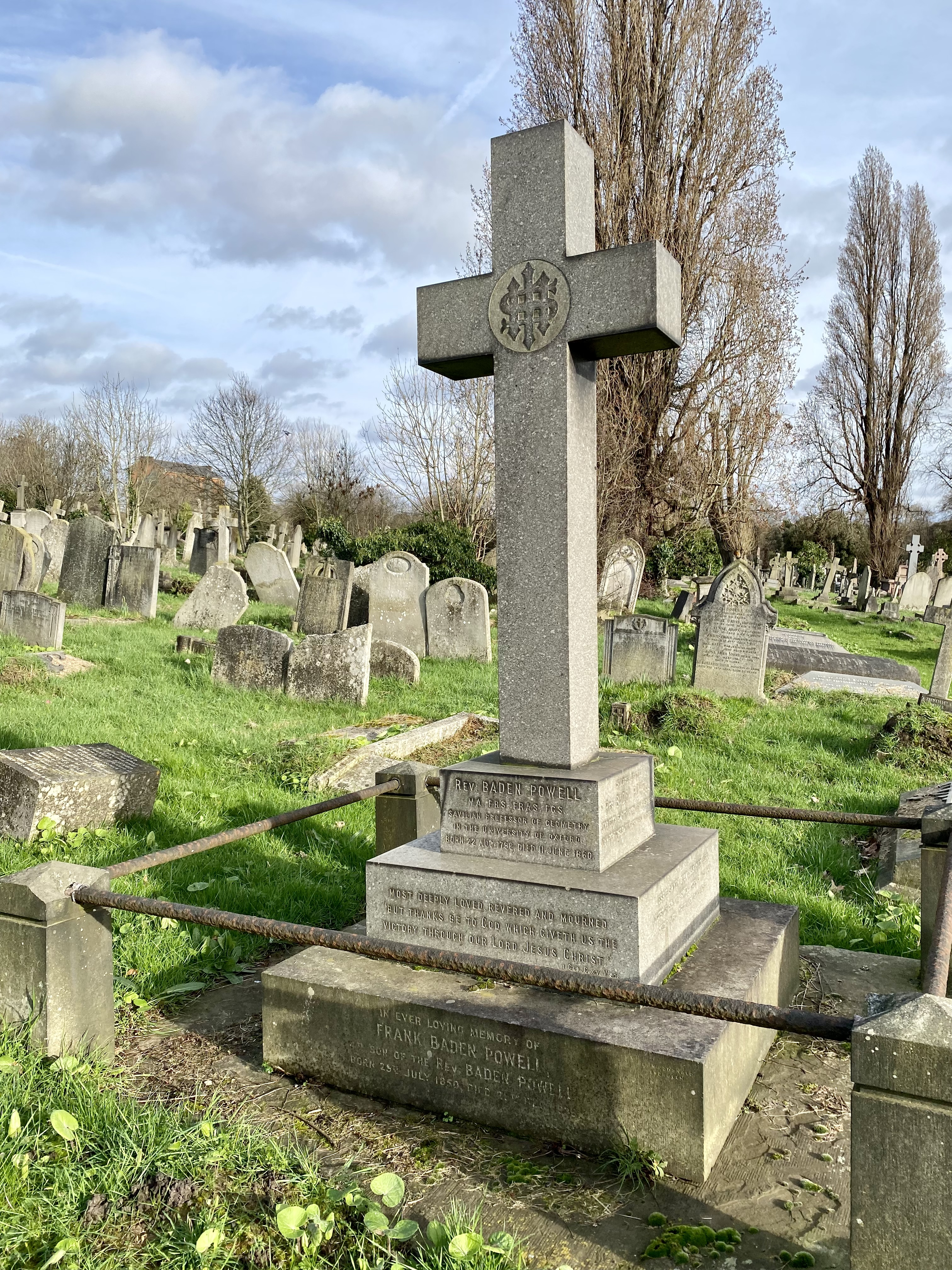
Powell's grave at Kensal Green Cemetery

Powell married three times, and had fourteen children in total. His widow changed the last name of the surviving children of his third marriage to "Baden-Powell".

Powell's first marriage on 21 July 1821 to Eliza Rivaz (died 13 March 1836) was childless.

His second marriage on 27 September 1837 to Charlotte Pope (died 14 October 1844) produced one son and three daughters:

- Charlotte Elizabeth Powell, (14 September 1838–20 October 1917)
- Baden Henry Baden-Powell, FRSE (23 August 1841–2 January 1901)
- Louisa Ann Powell, (18 March 1843–1 August 1896)
- Laetitia Mary Powell, (4 June 1844–2 September 1865)

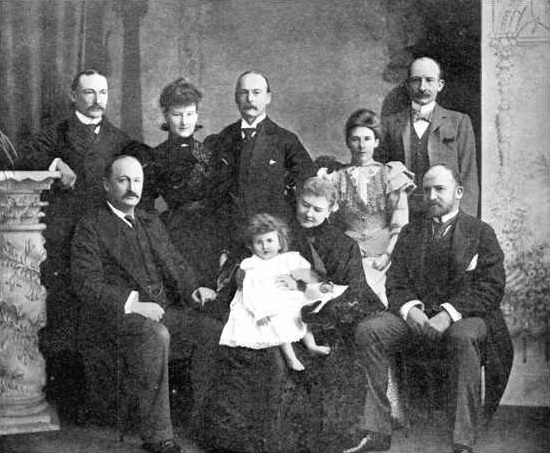
Survivors of Baden Powell's third family: Back row, standing (left to right): Major B. F. S. Baden-Powell; Miss Agnes D. S. Baden-Powell; Mr. Frank Baden-Powell; Colonel R. S. S. Baden-Powell. Front row, seated: Sir George Baden-Powell; Mrs. Henrietta Grace Baden-Powell with one of Powell's grandchildren; and Mr. Warington Baden-Powell

His third marriage on 10 March 1846 (at St Luke's Church, Chelsea) to Henrietta Grace Smyth (3 September 1824–13 October 1914), a daughter of Admiral Smyth, produced seven sons and three daughters:

- Henry Warington Baden-Powell, (3 February 1847–24 April 1921), a naval officer, a fellow of the Royal Geographical Society and a King's Counsel (K.C.)
- Sir George Smyth Baden-Powell, (24 December 1847–20 November 1898), a politician and Conservative MP (1885–1898)
- Augustus Smyth Powell (1849–1863)
- Francis (Frank) Smyth Baden-Powell (29 July 1850– 25 December 1933), an artist who exhibited at the Royal Academy of Arts
- Henrietta Smyth Powell (28 October 1851–9 March 1854)
- John Penrose Smyth Powell (21 December 1852–14 December 1855)
- Jessie Smyth Powell (25 November 1855–24 July 1856)
- Robert Stephenson Smyth Baden-Powell, 1st Baron Baden-Powell, (22 February 1857–8 January 1941), an army officer, writer and a founder of the World Scouting Movement and (with his sister Agnes) founder of the Girl Guides.
- Agnes Smyth Baden-Powell, (16 December 1858–2 June 1945), founder of the Girl Guides.
- Baden Fletcher Smyth Baden-Powell, (22 May 1860–3 October 1937), an army officer, aviator and president of the Royal Aeronautical Society

Shortly after Powell's death in 1860, his wife renamed the remaining children of his third marriage 'Baden-Powell'; the name was eventually legally changed by royal licence on 30 April 1902. Baden Henry Powell is often also referred to as Baden Henry Baden-Powell, and was using this name by the 1891 census.

== Evolution ==
Powell was an outspoken advocate of the constant uniformity of the laws of the material world. His views were liberal, and he was sympathetic to evolutionary theory long before Charles Darwin had revealed his ideas. He argued that science should not be placed next to scripture or the two approaches would conflict, and in his own version of Francis Bacon's dictum, contended that the book of God's works was separate from the book of God's word, claiming that moral and physical phenomena were completely independent.

His faith in the uniformity of nature (except man's mind) was set out in a theological argument; if God is a lawgiver, then a "miracle" would break the lawful edicts that had been issued at Creation. Therefore, a belief in miracles would be entirely atheistic. Powell's most significant works defended, in succession, the uniformitarian geology set out by Charles Lyell and the evolutionary ideas in Vestiges of the Natural History of Creation published anonymously by Robert Chambers which applied uniform laws to the history of life in contrast to more respectable ideas such as catastrophism involving a series of divine creations. "He insisted that no tortured interpretation of Genesis would ever suffice; we had to let go of the Days of Creation and base Christianity on the moral laws of the New Testament."

The boldness of Powell and other theologians in dealing with science led Joseph Dalton Hooker to comment in a letter to Asa Gray dated 29 March 1857: "These parsons are so in the habit of dealing with the abstractions of doctrines as if there was no difficulty about them whatever, so confident, from the practice of having the talk all to themselves for an hour at least every week with no one to gainsay a syllable they utter, be it ever so loose or bad, that they gallop over the course when their field is Botany or Geology as if we were in the pews and they in the pulpit. Witness the self-confident style of Whewell and Baden Powell, Sedgwick and Buckland." William Whewell, Adam Sedgwick and William Buckland opposed evolutionary ideas.

When the idea of natural selection was opened to debate by Charles Darwin and Alfred Russel Wallace in their 1858 papers to the Linnaean Society, both Powell and his brother-in-law William Henry Flower thought that natural selection made creation rational.

The 'Philosophy of Creation' has been treated in a masterly manner by the Rev. Baden Powell, in his 'Essays on the Unity of Worlds,' 1855. Nothing can be more striking than the manner in which he shows that the introduction of new species is "a regular, not a casual phenomenon," or, as Sir John Herschel expresses it, "a natural in contra-distinction to a miraculous process."

== Essays and Reviews ==
He was one of seven liberal theologians who produced a manifesto titled Essays and Reviews around February 1860, which amongst other things joined in the debate over On the Origin of Species. These Anglicans included Oxford professors, country clergymen, the headmaster of Rugby school and a layman. Their declaration that miracles were irrational stirred up unprecedented anger, drawing much of the fire away from Charles Darwin. Essays sold 22,000 copies in two years, more than the Origin sold in twenty years, and sparked five years of increasingly polarised debate with books and pamphlets furiously contesting the issues.

Referring to "Mr Darwin's masterly volume" and restating his argument that belief in miracles is atheistic, Baden Powell wrote that the book "must soon bring about an entire revolution in opinion in favour of the grand principle of the self-evolving powers of nature.":

Just a similar scepticism has been evinced by nearly all the first physiologists of the day, who have joined in rejecting the development theories of Lamarck and the Vestiges; and while they have strenuously maintained successive creations, have denied strenuously maintained successive creations, have denied and denounced the alleged production of organic life by Messrs. Crosse and Weekes, and stoutly maintained the impossibility of spontaneious generation, on the alleged ground of contradiction to experience. Yet it is now acknowledged under the high sanction of the name of Owen (British Association Address 1858), that 'creation' is only another name for our ignorance of the mode of production; and it has been the unanswered and unanswerable argument of another reasoner that new species must have originated either out of their inorganic elements, or out of previously organized forms; either development or spontaneous generation must be true: while a work has now appeared by a naturalist of the most acknowledged authority, Mr. Darwin's masterly volume on The Origin of Species by the law of 'natural selection' – which now substantiates on undeniable grounds the very principle so long denounced by the first naturalist – the origination of new species by natural causes: a work which must soon bring about an entire revolution of opinion in favour of the grand principle of the self-evolving powers of nature.

He would have been on the platform at the British Association for the Advancement of Science 1860 Oxford evolution debate that was a highlight of the reaction to Darwin's theory. Huxley's antagonist Wilberforce was also the foremost critic of Essays and Reviews. Powell died of a heart attack a fortnight before the meeting. He is buried in Kensal Green Cemetery, London.

== Works ==
- 1837: History of Natural Philosophy from the Earliest Periods to the Present Time Published by Longman, Brown, Green, and Longmans
- 1838: The Connexion of Natural and Divine Truth Or the Study of the Inductive Philosophy Considered as Subservient to Theology: Or, The Study of the Inductive Philosophy, Considered as Subservient to Theology, Published by J.W. Parker
- 1841: A General and Elementary View of the Undulatory Theory, as Applied to the Dispersion of Light, and Some Other Subjects: Including the Substance of Several Papers, Printed in the Philosophical Transactions, and Other Journals, Published by J.W. Parker
- 1854: (as editor) Lectures on Polarized Light: Together with a Lecture on the Microscope, Delivered Before the Pharmaceutical Society of Great Britain, and at the Medical School of the London Hospital by Jonathan Pereira, published by Longman, Brown, Green, and Longmans
- 1859: The Order of Nature: Considered in Reference to the Claims of Revelation : a Third Series of Essays, Published by Longman, Brown, Green, Longmans, & Roberts

== Papers to the Royal Society, the Ashmolean Society and others ==
- 1828 "The elements of curves: comprising, I. The geometrical principles of the conic sections; II. An introduction to the algebraic theory of curves; designed for the use of students in the University."
- 1829 "A short treatise on the principles of the differential and integral calculus"
- 1830 "An elementary treatise on the geometry of curves and curved surfaces, investigated by the application of the differential and integral calculus."
- 1832 "The present state and future prospects of mathematical and physical studies in the University of Oxford."
- 1833 "A short elementary treatise on experimental and mathematical optics."
- 1834 "On the achromatism of the eye "
- 1836 "On the theory of ratio and proportion, as treated by EUCLID, including an inquiry into the nature of quantity "
- 1836 "Observations for determining the refractive indices for the standard rays of the solar spectrum in various media "
- 1837 "An historical view of the progress of the physical and mathematical sciences from the earliest ages to the present times "
- 1837 "On the nature and evidence of the primary laws of motion "
- 1838 "Additional observations for determining the refractive indices for definite rays of the solar spectrum in several media "
- 1839 "A second supplement to observations for determining the refractive indices for definite rays of the solar spectrum in several media "
- 1841 "A general and elementary view of the undulatory theory, as applied to the dispersion of light and some other subjects... "
- 1842 "History of natural philosophy, from the earliest periods to the present time "
- 1842 "On the theory of parallel lines "
- 1842 "On necessary and contingent truth, considered in regard to some primary principles of mathematical and mechanical science... "
- 1849 "An essay on the relation of the several parts of a mathematical science to the fundamental idea therein contained... "
- 1850 "On irradiation"
- 1854 "Lectures on polarized light, together with a lecture on the microscope ... " with Jonathan Pereira
- 1855 "Essays on the spirit of the inductive philosophy, the unity of worlds, and the philosophy of creation "
- 1857 "Biographies of distinguished scientific men", by Francois ARAGO; translated (from the French) by William Henry SMYTH, Baden POWELL, and Robert GRANT

=== Books published ===
- 1829: A Short Treatise on the Principles of the Differential and Integral Calculus
- 1837: On the Nature and Evidence of the Primary Laws of Motion
- 1839: Tradition Unveiled: Or, an Exposition of the Pretensions and Tendency of Authoritative Teaching in the Church
- 1841: The Protestant's Warning and Safeguard in the Present Times
- 1841: A General and Elementary View of the Undulatory Theory, As Applied to the Dispersion of Light, and Some Other Subjects, Including the substance of several papers, printed in the Philosophical Transactions, and other journals.
- 1855: The Unity of Worlds and of Nature: Three Essays on the Spirit of Inductive Philosophy; the Plurality of Worlds; and the Philosophy of Creation
- 1856: Christianity without Judaism. Two sermons, London – Longman, Brown, Green Longmans and Roberts via HathiTrust
- 1859: The Order of Nature: Considered in Reference to the Claims of Revelation: A Third Series of Essays

=== Publications ===
==== Theology ====
- 1833 Revelation and Science. 1834 To the Editor of the British Critic.
- 1836 Remarks on Dr. Hampden, &c.
- 1838 Connection of Natural and Divine Truth
- 1839 Tradition Unveiled .... London and America.
- 1840 Supplement to Tradition Unveiled. Ditto ditto.
- 1841 State Education.
- 1841 The Protestant's Warning.
- 1843–4 Three Articles on Anglo-Catholicism in British and Foreign Review, Nos. 31, 32, 33.
- 1845 Kitto's Cyclopaedia of Biblical Literature – Articles, "Creation","Deluge", "Lord's Day", "Sabbath".
- 1845 Life of Blanco White December Westminster Review
- 1845 Tendency of Puseyism June Ditto.
- 1846 Mysticism and Scepticism . . . July Edinburgh Review.
- 1847 Protestant Principles Oxford Protestant Magazine
- 1847 On the Study of Christian Evidences . . Edinburgh Review.
- 1848 Freedom of Opinion Oxford Protestant Magazine
- 1848 Church and State Ditto.
- 1848 Free Enquiry and Liberality. . Kitto's Journal of Sacred Literature. 1848 The Law and the Gospel., ... Ditto.
- 1848 On the Application and Misapplication of Scripture Ditto.
- 1850 The State Church – A Sermon before the university.
- 1855 Unity of Worlds – Two Editions.
- 1856 On the Burnett Prizes, and the Study of Natural Theology – Oxford Essays
- 1857 Christianity without Judaism—2nd Series of Essays – Two Editions.
- 1859 The Order of Nature – 3rd Series of Essays.
- 1860 On the Study of the Evidences of Christianity, in Essays and Reviews

==== Science ====
- 1828 Elements of Curves-and two Supplements
- 1829 Differential Calculus, and application to Curves.
- 1830 On Examination Statutes
- 1832 On Mathematical Studies.
- 1833 Elementary Treatise on Optics.
- 1834 History of Natural Philosophy Cabinet Cyclopaedia.
- 1841 Treatise on the Undulatory Theory applied to Dispersion.
- 1851 Lecture Synopses in four parts – Geometry, Algebra, Conic Sections – Newton.
- 1857 Translation of Arago's Autobiography.
- 1857 Translations of Arago's Lives of Young, Malus, and Fresnel, with Optical Notes.

==== Papers in Philosophical Transactions of the Royal Society ====
- 1825 On Radiant Heat.
- 1826 Second on Radiant Heat.
- 1834 On Repulsion of Heat.
- 1835 On Dispersion of Light.
- 1836 Second on Dispersion of Light.
- 1837 Third and fourth on Dispersion of Light.
- 1840 On the Theory of the Dispersion of Light, &c.
- 1842 On certain cases of Elliptic Polarization.
- 1845 On Metallic Reflexion, &c.
- 1848 On Prismatic Interference 1832 On Radiant Heat.
- 1839 On Refractive Indices.
- 1841 On Radiant Heat – Second Report.

==== Reports to the British Association ====
- 1848–9 On Luminous Meteors (continued to 1869).
- 1882 to 1849 Numerous Papers on Sectional Proceedings.
- 1854 On Radiant Heat—Third Report.

==== In Memoirs of the Royal Astronomical Society ====
- 1845 On a Double Image Micrometer.
- 1847 On Luminous Rings, &c.
- 1849 On Irradiation. (In Royal Astronomical Society's Proceedings.)
- 1847 On the Beads seen in Eclipses.
- 1853 On Foucault's Experiments on Rotation of Earth, &c.
- 1858 On C. Piazzi Smyth's Artificial Horizon.

==== In Ashmolean Society's memoirs ====
- 1832 On the Acromatism of the Eye.
- On Refractive Indices – Three Papers.
- On Ratios and Proportion.
- 1849 On the Laws of Motion.
- On the Theory of Parallels.
- On Necessary and Contingent Truth

==== Royal Institution abstracts of lectures ====
- 1848 On Shooting Stars.
- 1849 On the Nebular Theory.
- 1850 On Optical Phenomena in Astronomy.
- 1851 On Foucault's Pendulum Experiment
- 1852 On Light and Heat.
- 1854 On Rotatory Motion.
- 1858 On Rotatory Motion Applied to Observations at Sea.
- 1822 Translation of Raymond on Barometrical Measurement, with an Appendix .... Annals of Philosophy.
- 1823-5 Various, Papers on Light and Heat. Ditto.
- 1825-6 Two Papers on Heat. Quar. Jour. of Science.
- 1828 Two Papers on Polarization of Heat. Brewster's Philosophical Journal.
- 1830 On Mathematical Studies....London Review.
- 1832-3 Several Papers on Interference of Light, Diffraction, &c – Annals of Philosophy and Phil. Mag.
- 1834 On Radiant Heat Jameson's Phil. Journ.
- 1835–6 On Cauchy's Theory of Dispersion of Light, &c Journal of Science and Phil. Mag.
- Various Papers in Vol. I. of Mag. of Popular Science.
- Many Papers in Journal of Education.
- On the Progress of Optics . . . British Annual.
- On the State of Oxford Ditto.
- The Lives of Black and Lavoisier....Useful Knowledge Gallery of Portraits.
- 1838 On University Reform . .July Monthly Chron.
- 1838-9 Various Papers on Light. Journal of Science.
- 1838-9 Papers on Light .... Philosophical Magazine.
- 1839 Correspondence with Brewster, Athenaeum.
- 1839 On Comte's Philosophie Positive ....Monthly Chronicle.
- 1841 On Light Philosophical Magazine.
- 1841 Papers on Light Journal of Science.
- 1843 Review of Carpenter's Cyclopaedia ....Dublin University Magazine.
- 1843 Sir Isaac Newton and his Contemporaries Edinburgh Review.
- 1843 Review of Rigaud's History of the Principia. Ditto.
- 1846 On Aberration of Light . . .Journal of Science and Philosophical Magazine.
- 1852 On Lord Brougham's Optical Experiments. Journal of Science
- 1854 On Foucault's Gyroscope. . Journal of Science and Philosophical Magazine
- 1856 Life of Young . . . National Review and Philosophical Magazine
- 1856 On Brewster's Life of Newton .... Edinburgh Review.
- 1856 On Fresnel's Formulae for Light – July, August, and October – Journal of Science and Philosophical Magazine.
- 1857 Life and Writings of Arago Ditto.

==== Also ====
- 1834 A Letter to the Editor of The British Critic

== Notable students ==
Lewis Carroll attended the lectures on pure geometry by Baden Powell.

== Collections ==
In 1970, 170 volumes from Powell's library were presented to the Bodleian Libraries by his grandson, D. F. W. Baden Powell.
