= Girl Guides =

Organisations for girls and young women

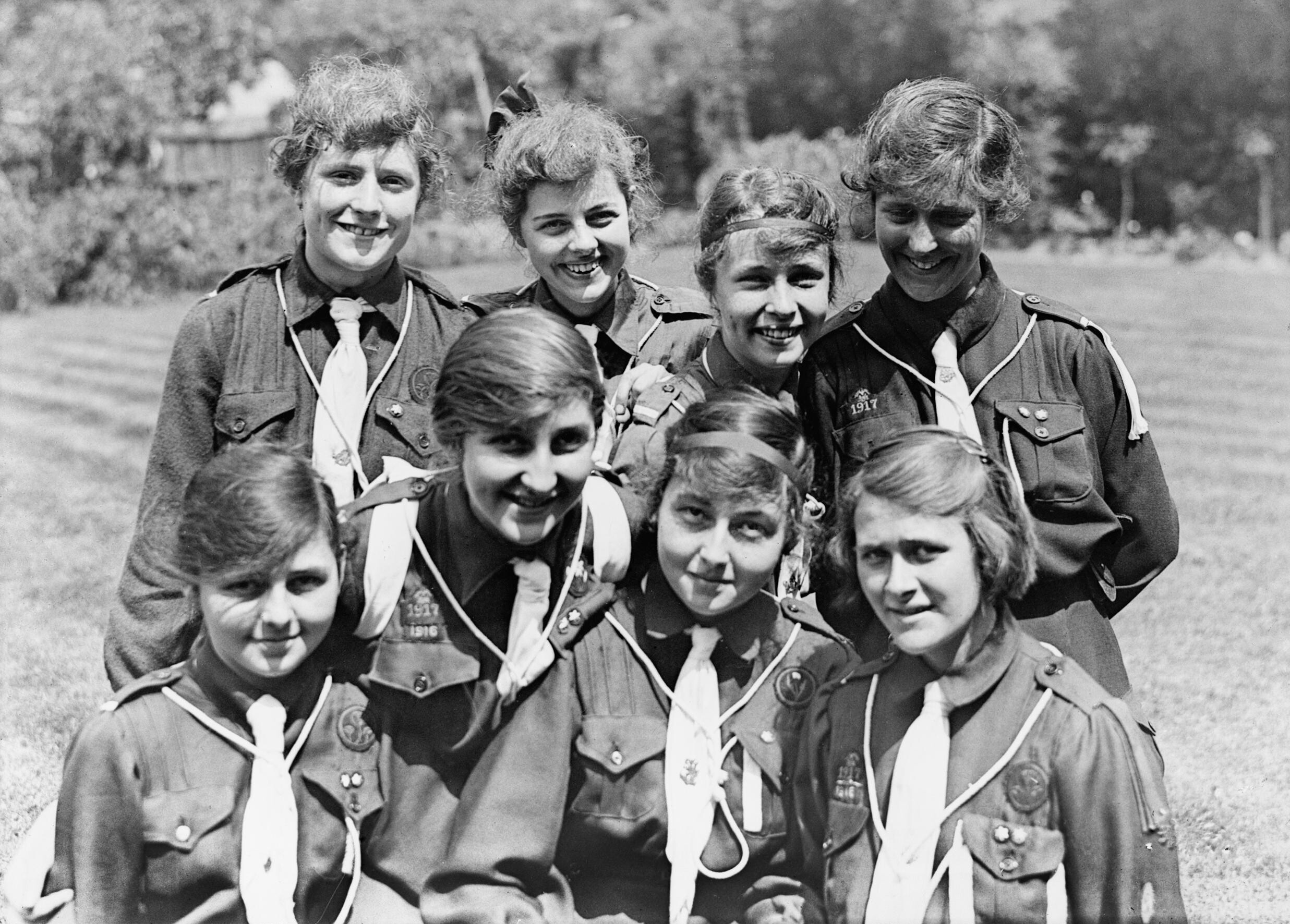
- A Girl Guide Company in the United Kingdom, 1918
- Founded: 1910; 116 years ago
- Founder: Agnes Baden-Powell

Girl Guides are organisations within the Scout Movement, originally and largely still for girls and women only, with distinct names, emblems, programs and other characteristics. The Girl Guides began in 1910 with the formation of The Girl Guides Association in the United Kingdom, following which, Girl Guide organisations were formed in other countries.

== History ==
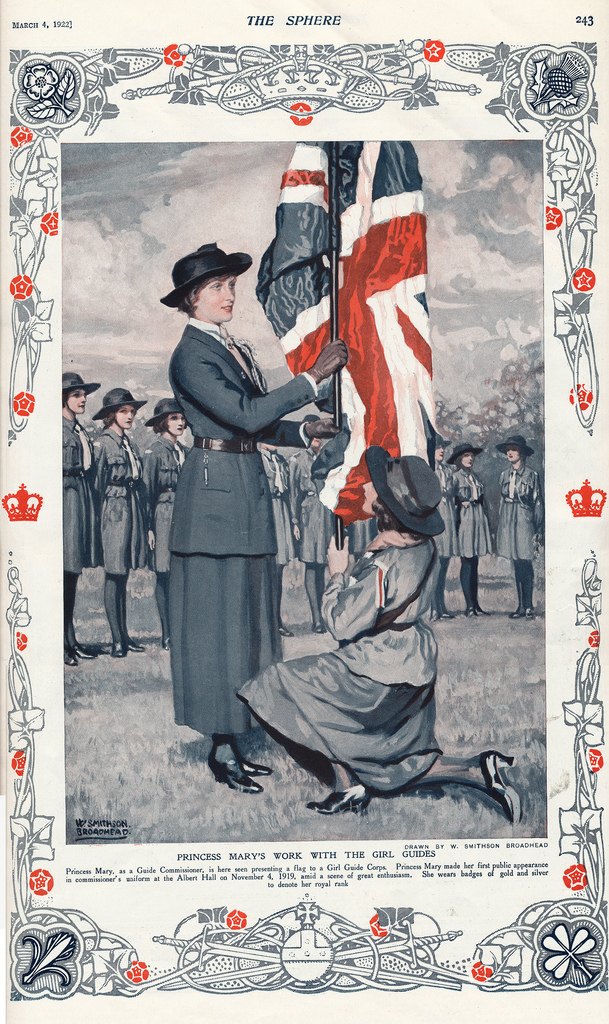
Princess Mary and Girl Guides, 1922

Following the popular spread of the Scout Movement, girls joined with Boy Scouts or formed themselves into patrols of "Girl Scouts". Many Girl Scouts registered with Baden-Powell's Boy Scout headquarters. In 1909, there was a Boy Scout rally at Crystal Palace in London. Among the thousands of Scouts at the rally were several hundred Girl Scouts, including a group of girls from Peckham Rye who did not have tickets to the event and asked to be allowed to join-in.

However, at that time, camping and hiking were not common or widely accepted activities for girls, as indicated from an excerpt from The Boy Scouts Headquarters Gazette of 1909: "If a girl is not allowed to run, or even hurry, to swim, ride a bike, or raise her arms above her head, how can she become a Scout?" Following negative publicity about girls joining-in the Scout Movement in The Spectator magazine, Robert Baden-Powell had his sister, Agnes Baden-Powell, form a separate organisation for girls in 1910, The Girl Guides Association in the United Kingdom. However, some girls and organisations in the United Kingdom and other countries continued as Girl Scouts. Baden-Powell named the Girl Guides after the British Indian Army Corps of Guides. The first Girl Guide company to be registered was 1st Pinkneys Green Guides (Miss Baden-Powell's Own), which still exist in Pinkneys Green, Maidenhead, Berkshire. In 1912, Juliette Gordon Low founded the Girl Guides of America. Similar Girl Guide organisations were formed in other some countries.

Other influential women in the history of the Girl Guides were Olga Drahonowska-Małkowska in Poland and Antoinette Butte in France.

The World Association of Girl Guides and Girl Scouts (WAGGGS) was formed in 1928 and has member organisations in 153 countries.

Some Girl Guide organisations later opened participation to boys and others merged with Boy Scout organisations.

=== Guide International Service ===
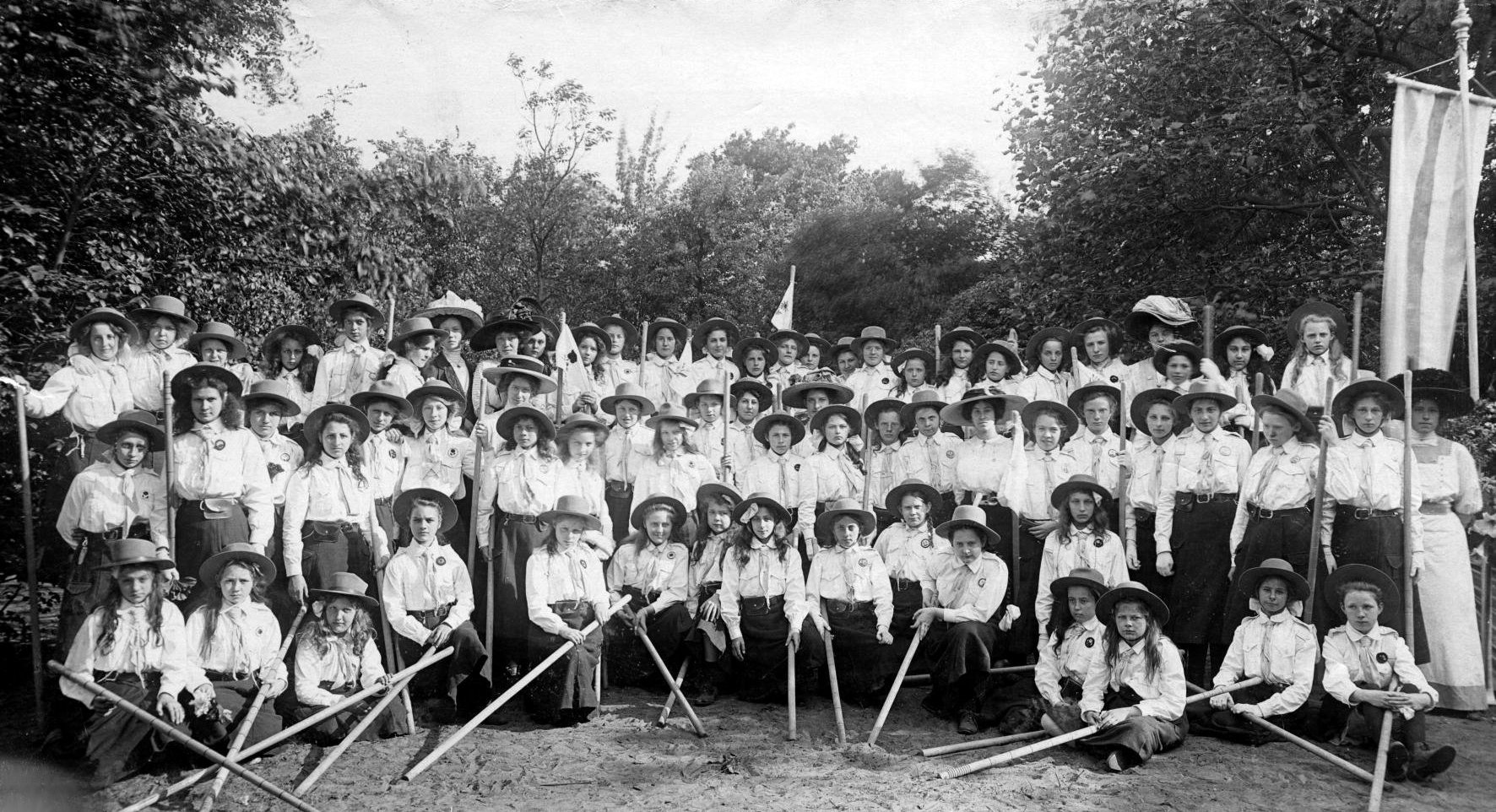
Eerste Nederlandsche Meisjes Gezellen Vereeniging (First Dutch Girls Companions Society), 1911, first Dutch Girl Guides

The Guide International Service (GIS) was established by the Girl Guides Association in the UK in 1942, with the aim of sending teams of adult Guides into Europe after World War II to aid with relief work.

A total of 198 Guiders and 60 Scout leaders from Britain, Australia, Canada, Denmark, Holland, Ireland, Kenya, New Zealand and Russia served in teams. Working with UNRRA and the Council of British Societies for Relief Abroad, the GIS sent a number of teams to various parts of occupied Europe including Greece, the Netherlands and Germany, as well as Malaya. Notably members of team RS/107 were among the first civilians to enter the Bergen-Belsen concentration camp.

Notable volunteers included:

- Frieda Barfus, Guider-in-charge at Our Ark, GIS archivist and member of RS/136 in Germany.
- Stella Cunliffe, first female president of the Royal Statistical Society. Cunliffe was leader of team RS/107 in Bergen-Belsen displaced persons camp.
- Alison Duke, classical scholar, served with RRU7 in Egypt and Greece.
- Elizabeth Hartley, vice-chair of the 20th World Conference, leader of the RS/158 training team.
- Sue Ryder, was initially a member of RS/159b and later one of the final serving solo volunteers.
- Lady Marjorie Stopford, South Hertfordshire Division Commissioner, also served with RRU7 in Egypt and Greece.
- Rosa Ward, was chairman of the Guide International Service committee for its entire duration.

The work of the Guide International Service influenced the World Chief Guide Olave Baden-Powell to return to Britain, having emigrated to Kenya with her late husband prior to the war.

== Single-sex mission ==
There has been much discussion about how similar Girl Guide programs should be to Scout programs. While some Girl Guide organisations have sought to follow similar practices as Scout organisations, most Girl Guide organisations have sought to avoid simply copying or mimicking the activities of Scout organisations and have maintained distinctive programs. In 2012, Julie Bentley, Girlguiding chief executive in the United Kingdom described the Girl Guides as "the ultimate feminist organisation".

Most Girl Guide organisations remained sex-separated to provide a female-centred program, even after most Scout organisations became mixed-sex and some Girl Guide organisations merged with Scout organisations. For example, Girlguiding in the United Kingdom remains limited to girls.

Transgender girls are no longer admitted to units within the UK even though they previously were due to changes to the 2010 Equality Act made in 2025. Transgender women were allowed to become leaders in some countries, including the UK.

== Other key elements ==
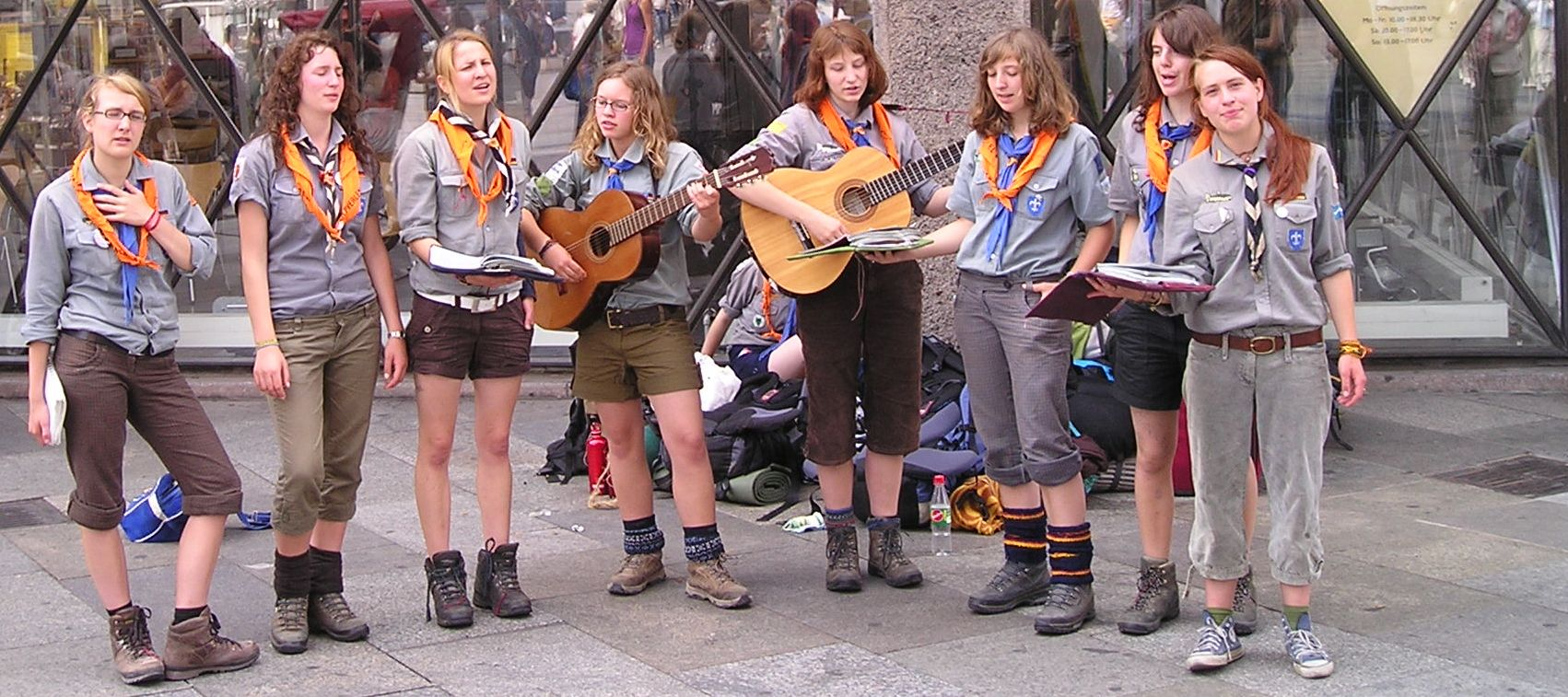
Singing Girl Guides in Germany, 2007

Elements common to all Guide organisations are:

- The Guide Promise – Girls become Guides by making their Promise. Each Girl Guide organisation has its own promise, but historically all have the same three parts: duty to God or to your beliefs, duty to your country, and keeping the Guide Law. Many Girl Guide organisations are moving towards non-religious Promises.
- The Good Turn – Each Guide tries to do a kind thing for someone else, without payment and without being asked, every day.
- The trefoil badge – This can be worn on uniform or ordinary clothes. The three leaves of the trefoil stand for the threefold Promise. The vein in the centre is a compass needle, pointing the way and the two stars stand for the Promise and the Law. The colours stand for the golden sun shining over all the children of the world, from a blue sky. This badge is a guiding symbol that can be recognized all over the world.
- The Guide world flag – This is in the same colours as the trefoil badge and can be carried or flown by any Guide. It is often used as a unit flag. The three yellow blocks represent the threefold Promise and the white corner represents the commitment to peace of all Guides.
- The Guide Sign – The three fingers stand for the three parts of the Promise. The Guide sign is used when making or renewing the Promise and can be used when meeting other Guides. It may also be used when receiving a badge or at the end of meetings.
- The Motto – "Be Prepared" – This means that Guides are ready to cope with anything that might come their way.
- The left handshake – This is the way Girl Guides greet each other. The left hand is used because it is the one nearest the heart, symbolizing friendship. Additionally, warriors held their shield in the left hand, so putting down one's shield to shake with one's left hand means that they are vulnerable, making it a display of both bravery and trust.
- World Thinking Day – On February 22 each year, Guides think of their Guide sisters all around the world. The date was chosen at a World Conference because it was the birthday of both the Founder and the World Chief Guide.
- The World Centres – There are five World Centres in different parts of the world: Our Chalet in Adelboden, Switzerland; Pax Lodge in London, England; Nuestra Cabaña in Cuernavaca, Mexico; Sangam in Pune, India; and Kusafiri which moves around Africa.
- The World Chief Guide – Olave Baden-Powell (1889 - 1977), wife of the founder, Robert Baden-Powell, is the only person to have been World Chief Guide.

Two central themes have been present from the earliest days of the Girl Guides: domestic skills and "a kind of practical feminism which embodies physical fitness, survival skills, camping, citizenship training, and career preparation". These two themes have been emphasized differently at different times and by different Girl Guide organisations, but have remained central to Girl Guides.

=== Uniforms ===
Individual organisation or other emblems may be found on the individual country's Scouting article.

Uniform is a specific characteristic of Girl Guide organisations. Robert Baden-Powell said uniform "hides all differences of social standing in a country and makes for equality; but, more important still, it covers differences of country and race and creed, and makes all feel that they are members with one another of the one great brotherhood".

Baden-Powell's 1909 discussion paper, The Scheme for Girl Guides, proposed the following uniform:

Jersey of company colour. Neckerchief of company colour. Skirt, knickers, stockings, dark blue. Cap – red biretta, or in summer, large straw hat. Haversack, cooking billy, lanyard and knife, walking stick or light staff. Cape, hooked up on the back. Shoulder knot, of the 'Group' colour on the left shoulder. Badges, much the same as the Boy Scouts. Officers wear ordinary country walking-dress, with biretta of dark blue, white shoulder knot, walking stick, and whistle on lanyard.

Guide uniforms vary according to cultures, climates and the activities undertaken. They are often adorned with badges indicating a Guide's achievements and responsibilities. In some places, uniforms are manufactured and distributed by approved companies and the local Guide organisation. In other places, Girl Guides make uniforms themselves.

== See also ==
- 100 Years of Girl Guides
- Rainbow
- Brownies
- Girl Guide and Girl Scout
- Ranger Guide
- List of World Association of Girl Guides and Girl Scouts members
