= List of Desert Island Discs episodes (2011–2020) =

The BBC Radio 4 programme Desert Island Discs invites castaways to choose eight pieces of music, a book (in addition to the Bible – or a religious text appropriate to that person's beliefs – and the Complete Works of Shakespeare) and a luxury item that they would take to an imaginary desert island, where they will be marooned indefinitely.

The rules state that the chosen luxury item must not be anything animate or indeed anything that enables the castaway to escape from the island, for instance a radio set, sailing yacht or aeroplane. The choices of book and luxury can sometimes give insight into the guest's life, and the choices of guests from 2011 to 2020.

Desert Island Discs takes two short breaks, in (the northern) spring and summer. BBC Radio 4 broadcasts new programmes for approximately 42 weeks each year on Sunday mornings, usually with a repeat transmission five days later. On Remembrance Sunday (in November) the programme is not broadcast but that week's programme gets a single airing in the Friday repeat slot.

== 2011 ==
Date	Castaway	Book	Luxury
2 January 2011	Tony Iveson	A volume of W. Somerset Maugham's short stories	Two established vines and a tin bath to make wine
9 January 2011	Gyles Brandreth	The complete plays of Anton Chekhov	Michelangelo's Pietà
16 January 2011	Alex Salmond	The complete works of Robert Burns	A sand wedge and endless golf balls for playing golf
23 January 2011	Betty Driver	Rebecca by Daphne du Maurier	Eau de Soir perfume by Sisley
30 January 2011	Jon Snow	Team of Rivals: The Political Genius of Abraham Lincoln by Doris Kearns Goodwin	A set of watercolours and an endless supply of paper
6 February 2011	Howard Jacobson	Oxford Book of English Verse	A never ending supply of pressed shirts and trousers
13 February 2011	Celia Imrie	Brewer's Dictionary of Phrase and Fable	A cut glass crystal chandelier with candles
20 February 2011	Lawrence Dallaglio	Ripley's World by Andy Ripley	A great big jar of Marmite
27 February 2011	Dame Anne Owers	An anthology of British poetry	A solar powered word processor
3 April 2011	Martin Sheen	The Brothers Karamazov by Fyodor Dostoyevsky	Golf clubs
10 April 2011	Terry Gilliam	Dictionary	A mirror
17 April 2011	Felicity Green	Finishing the Hat by Stephen Sondheim	A bronze sculpture by Giles Penny
24 April 2011	Cath Kidston	The Larousse French/English Dictionary	Hot water bottle
1 May 2011	Professor David Phillips	War and Peace by Leo Tolstoy	Piano with music
8 May 2011	Molly Parkin	The History of the Colony by Sophie Parkin	Her entire outfit including her Andrew Logan brooch
15 May 2011	Kwame Kwei-Armah	The complete works of August Wilson	A basic word processor
22 May 2011	Debbie Harry	War and Peace by Leo Tolstoy	Paints and paper
29 May 2011	Roger Waters	All the Pretty Horses by Cormac McCarthy	Grand piano
5 June 2011	Alfie Boe	A tropical recipe book	His own drum kit
12 June 2011	Andrea Levy	Roget's Thesaurus	Mosquito repellent
19 June 2011	Len Goodman	An anthology of British poetry	Set of golf clubs and balls
26 June 2011	Dame Harriet Walter	The complete works of Isabella Bird	Flute
3 July 2011	Tony Robinson	Middlemarch by George Eliot	Luxury mattress and pillow
10 July 2011	Reverend John Graham	The complete works of Saki	A telescope
17 July 2011	Michael McIntyre	The Complete Prose of Woody Allen	Pen
24 July 2011	Heather Rabbatts	Pride and Prejudice by Jane Austen	A solar powered digital photo album
31 July 2011	Danny Baker	The Most of S J Perelman	His blue suede shoe
18 September 2011	Martin Clunes	Puckoon by Spike Milligan	An electric guitar
25 September 2011	Arthur Edwards	A photographic album with pictures of his family	An inexhaustible supply of tea and a kettle
2 October 2011	Anne Wood	Cotillion by Georgette Heyer	Paper, pen and watercolours to record the plant life on the island
9 October 2011	Vidal Sassoon	The Brothers Karamazov by Fyodor Dostoyevsky	A dozen bottles of Vidal Sassoon hair shampoo
16 October 2011	Michael Johnson	The biggest possible encyclopaedia	McLaren SLR sports car with petrol
23 October 2011	Mark Gatiss	The Complete Sherlock Holmes by Sir Arthur Conan Doyle	A Victorian bath and hot water
30 October 2011	Lord Victor Adebowale	The Complete Works of Wole Soyinka	His saxophone
6 November 2011	Francesca Simon	The Eustace Diamonds by Anthony Trollope	A cappucino maker
18 November 2011	Anna Scher	Poem of the Day	A bespoke statue of Archbishop Desmond Tutu
20 November 2011	Robert Hardy	The Great Warbow by Robert Hardy and Matthew Strickland	Young Girl in Profile, 1495 – De Predis
27 November 2011	Bear Grylls	Robinson Crusoe by Daniel Defoe	A laminated photo of his family
4 December 2011	Sir Martin Sorrell	The Talmud	Cricket bat, ball and stumps
11 December 2011	Eve Pollard	Maritime Intelligence and Publications	Tweezers
18 December 2011	Baron Fellowes of West Stafford	The complete works of Anthony Trollope	Two enormous casks of Château Margaux
30 December 2011	Professor Brian Cox	Classic Electrodynamics by John David Jackson	A coffee machine

== 2012 ==
Date	Castaway	Book	Luxury
1 January 2012	Sir Terry Wogan	War and Peace by Leo Tolstoy	Bottles, pens and paper
8 January 2012	Dame Monica Mason	A special compilation of all of David Attenborough's books	A torch
15 January 2012	Paul Johnson	A big atlas	Watercolour paints and paper
22 January 2012	Vikram Seth	An anthology of poems to include ones by Chinese poet Du Fu	Calligraphy materials
29 January 2012	Sir David Attenborough	Shifts and Expedients of Camp Life by W B Lord	A piano
5 February 2012	Denise Lewis	Oprah: An Autobiography by Oprah Winfrey	Sex and the City DVD boxset
12 February 2012	James Corden	A guide to learning the piano	A piano
19 February 2012	John Prescott	Smile Though Your Heart Is Breaking by Pauline Prescott	A Bontempi keyboard
26 February 2012	Brian Moore	Germinal by Émile Zola	A football
4 March 2012	Patsy Rodenburg	A large anthology of poetry	An endless supply of tea
11 March 2012	Jackie Mason	The Complete Works of Sholem Aleichem	An easy chairman
18 March 2012	Anna Ford	Staying Alive: Real Poems for Unreal Times	Endless supply of leaf tea, teapot, mug and semi-skimmed milk
25 March 2012	Jamie Cullum	On the Road by Jack Kerouac	A huge stack of white paper and pencils
6 May 2012	Tim Minchin	Slaughterhouse-Five by Kurt Vonnegut	Robotic sex doll
13 May 2012	Baroness Hollins	100 Masterpieces of Art	Her clarinet
20 May 2012	Peter Ackroyd	The Imitation of Christ by Thomas à Kempis	Pen and paper
27 May 2012	Denise Robertson	A book on practical survival	An endless supply of pens and paper
3 June 2012	Margaret Rhodes	Reader's Digest – The Most Amazing Gardens in Britain and Ireland	Her favourite blue jersey
10 June 2012	Doreen Lawrence	I Know Why the Caged Bird Sings by Maya Angelou	An artist's workshop
17 June 2012	Ahdaf Soueif	Keepers of the Flame by Ian Hamilton	Paper and coloured pens
24 June 2012	John Bishop	Family photo album	Lifetime's supply of toothbrushes and toothpaste
1 July 2012	Charles Jencks	The Act of Creation by Arthur Koestler	3D printer
8 July 2012	Martina Navratilova	The Fountainhead by Ayn Rand	A pillow her mother made for her
15 July 2012	Simon McBurney	And Our Faces, My Heart, Brief as Photos by John Berger	A pillow with the smell of his family
22 July 2012	Akram Khan	The God of Small Things by Arundhati Roy	A skipping rope
29 July 2012	Mary Berry	RHS A-Z Encyclopaedia of Garden Plants	Cashmere rug
5 August 2012	Baroness Campbell of Surbiton	A very large atlas	A customised wheelchair
12 August 2012	Craig Brown	The 11th edition of the Encyclopædia Britannica	Conjouring set
23 September 2012	Goldie Hawn	The Art of Loving by Erich Fromm	Lip gloss
30 September 2012	Ade Adepitan	Chronicles of the Lensmen by E. E. Smith	Basketball court with hoop and ball
7 October 2012	Celia Birtwell	Tropical Flowering Plants by Kirsten Albrecht Llamas	A luxurious bed
14 October 2012	Noah Stewart	The Joy of Cooking	A spa with whirlpool
21 October 2012	Mona Siddiqui	A top ten short story collection featuring Mansfield, Maugham, Chekhov and Hemingway	Tea, milk and sugar
28 October 2012	Hilary Devey	Never Look Back	An endless supply of Cointreau with ice in a crystal glass
4 November 2012	Tidjane Thiam	The Brothers Karamazov by Fydor Dostoyevsky	Solar-powered ice cream maker
16 November 2012	Blanche Marvin	The Golden Bough by James Frazer	Paper, pens and pencils
18 November 2012	John Lloyd	The Book on the Taboo Against Knowing Who You Are by Alan Watts	A whirligig festooned with flower seeds
25 November 2012	Edmund de Waal	The collected poems of Wallace Stevens	An espresso machine
2 December 2012	Dustin Hoffman	The complete works of Charles Dickens	An endless bar
9 December 2012	Eric Pickles	If This Is a Man by Primo Levi	Kettle, tea service and container of Earl Grey tea
16 December 2012	Sister Wendy Beckett	An enormous book of logical puzzles	Refrigerated tabernacle
23 December 2012	Dawn French	Puckoon by Spike Milligan	Her daughter's teddy bear
30 December 2012	Anya Hindmarch	Grimm's fairy tales	Yellow rotating pencil and a book of unlined paper

== 2013 ==
Date	Castaway	Book	Luxury
6 January 2013	Sir Howard Stringer	The short stories of F. Scott Fitzgerald	An easy chairman
13 January 2013	Martin Carthy	The collected works of Charles Dickens	His guitar
20 January 2013	Beryl Vertue	A book of family photographs	Acoustic guitar and a book of instructions
27 January 2013	Aung San Suu Kyi	Abhidharma	A never-ending supply of different coloured roses
3 February 2013	Sir Terry Leahy	The complete works of Charles Dickens	Tea
10 February 2013	Julie Burchill	This Is Uncool: The 500 Greatest Singles Since Punk and Disco by Garry Mulholland	Alcohol still
17 February 2013	Jonathan Agnew	City of Joy by Dominique Lapierre	Lawnmower with an endless supply of fuel
24 February 2013	Uta Frith	Book of hours from Sir John Soane's museum	Her doll's house
3 March 2013	Rankin	Tuulitastic by Rankin	Pluto and Persephone by Berini
10 March 2013	David Almond	Arabian Nights	Japanese notebooks and pens
17 March 2013	Julie Goodyear	Jonathan Livingston Seagull by Richard Bach	Her mother's bus pass
24 March 2013	Jasvinder Sanghera	I Know Why the Caged Bird Sings by Maya Angelou	Her father's milk churn
31 March 2013	Sir Sydney Kentridge	The Jeeves Omnibus by P G Wodehouse	An endless supply of coffee and a machine to make it with
12 May 2013	Damien Hirst	The Bride Stripped Bare by Her Bachelors Even, Again	A work of art by Roger Hiorns called "Untitled 2009"
19 May 2013	Alice Walker	Human Race Get Off Your Knees: The Lion Sleeps No More by David Icke	Solar powered vitamix
26 May 2013	Deborah Bull	The Encyclopedia of the Human Brain	Will Tuckett's Pleasure's Progress
2 June 2013	Sir Mervyn King	Complete illustrated catalogue of the National Gallery	Telescope
9 June 2013	Conrad Anker	The complete works of Jack London	Rope and rack
16 June 2013	Alexandra Shulman	Penguin Book of Love Poetry by Jon Stallworthy	An endless supply of Miss Dior Eau du Toilette
23 June 2013	Hugh Laurie	An encyclopaedia	A double set of throwing knives
30 June 2013	Steven Pinker	Oxford English Dictionary	Carbon fibre bicycle
7 July 2013	Jane Somerville	The Scarlet Pimpernel by Baroness Emmuska Orczy	Hot bath every day with Rose Geranium bath essence by Floris
14 July 2013	Val McDermid	The Complete Works of Robert Louis Stevenson	Solar-powered laptop used solely for playing games
21 July 2013	Russell Brand	The Bhagavad Gita	Stuffed effigy of Noel Gallagher
28 July 2013	Mary Robinson	The Field Day Anthology of Irish Writing	Solar cooker and fridge
4 August 2013	Eve Stewart	The Complete Works of Charles Dickens	A lifetime supply of self-firing clay
11 August 2013	Daniel Kahneman	Thesaurus	Reclining chair
22 September 2013	Zadie Smith	A la recherché du temps perdu by Marcel Proust	Goggles
29 September 2013	Lee Mack	A Brief History of Time by Stephen Hawking	Coffee machine, coffee, fridge, milk and teaspoon
6 October 2013	Carolyn McCall	Pride and Prejudice by Jane Austen	Solar-powered iPad with all her photos
13 October 2013	Chris Packham	The complete works of F. Scott Fitzgerald	Binoculars
20 October 2013	Jeremy Hutchinson	The complete works of Thomas Hardy	The Tempest by Giorgione
27 October 2013	Professor Tanya Byron	Emma by Jane Austen	A large piano
3 November 2013	Sir Ken Robinson	India's Summer by Therese	A large quad bike with a solar panel
15 November 2013	Alfred Brendel	Aphorisms by Georg Christoph Lichtenberg	Romanesque chapel adjacent to Montmajour Abbey in Provence
17 November 2013	Malorie Blackman	Jane Eyre by Charlotte Brontë	Bicycle
24 November 2013	Ed Miliband MP	The Hitchhiker's Guide to the Galaxy by Douglas Adams	Weekly delivery of a Chicken Tikka takeaway
1 December 2013	Clare Balding	Encyclopedia of nature	Thermos mug with tea, milk and sugar
8 December 2013	Barbara Hulanicki	Roget's Thesaurus	Sketch book
15 December 2013	Gillian Clarke	Anthology of poetry	Brynmawr writing desk
22 December 2013	Miranda Hart	The Complete Works of Margaret Luce	Wimbledon Centre court, racquet, balls and a ball machine
29 December 2013	Ant and Dec	The Collected Works of William Boyd (for Ant) and High Fidelity by Nick Hornby (for Dec)	A blow up chair (for Ant) and tweezers (for Dec)

== 2014 ==
Date	Castaway	Book	Luxury
5 January 2014	Ray Mears	A blank book to record his Desert Island findings	A huge pair of speakers
12 January 2014	Nicola Benedetti	Long Walk to Freedom – her personal copy by Nelson Mandela	Violin in its case with some pieces of sheet music
19 January 2014	Reverend Rose Hudson-Wilkin	The Complete Works of Maya Angelou	Large collection of earrings
26 January 2014	Sir Ben Ainslie	Great Expectations by Charles Dickens	A flight simulator
2 February 2014	Bob Harris	A fictional book about cricket statistics	A greenhouse
9 February 2014	Dame Elish Angiolini	Oxford Anthology of Poetry	A photograph of all the people she loves
16 February 2014	Jayne Torvill and Christopher Dean	Angela's Ashes by Frank McCourt (for Torvill) and Oh, the Places You'll Go by Dr. Theodor Seuss (for Dean)	Jo Malone moisturizer (for Torvill) and endless supply of coffee and digestive biscuits (for Dean)
23 February 2014	Professor Hugh Montgomery	SAS Survival Handbook of Survival by John Wiseman	A spear fishing kit
2 March 2014	Mairi Hedderwick	A book containing all the Ordnance Survey maps of the Highlands and Islands of Scotland	A wonderful bath that comes down from the skies
9 March 2014	Lord Richards of Herstmonceux	The complete works of Patrick O'Brian	Sailcloth
16 March 2014	Murray Walker	How to Survive Anything, Anywhere: A Handbook of Survival Skills for Every Scenario and Environment by Chris McNab	A hammock and pillow
23 March 2014	Dame Claire Bertschinger	A book of monologues	A Swiss Army knife
30 March 2014	Sir Andre Geim	None	Amarone
11 May 2014	Jack Dee	A big comprehensive encyclopedia	Acoustic guitar
18 May 2014	Alison Moyet	His Dark Materials by Philip Pullman	A bath
25 May 2014	René Redzepi	Complete set of Mad magazine	One full day of snow
1 June 2014	Biddy Baxter	The Traveller's Tree by Patrick Leigh Fermor	Toast and dripping
8 June 2014	Tamara Rojo	Love in the Time of Cholera by Gabriel García Márquez	Bed
15 June 2014	Raja Shehadeh	Arabian Nights	A packet of seeds
22 June 2014	Judy Murray	The Da Vinci Code by Dan Brown	Moisturiser cream
29 June 2014	Lily Allen	Auntie Mame by Patrick Dennis	Husband's shirt with daughter's bunny sewn on to it
6 July 2014	Sir Michael Marmot	Oxford English Dictionary (all 13 volumes and supplements)	Viola
13 July 2014	Anne Reid	The Complete Works of George and Ira Gershwin	A piano
20 July 2014	Doug Allan	1 Volume of Encyclopædia Britannica	Guitar
27 July 2014	Dame Wendy Hall	Complete printed out pages of Wikipedia	Spa and favourite spa products
3 August 2014	Guy Garvey	The collected works of J D Salinger	Bushmill Irish whiskey and ice
10 August 2014	Malcolm Gladwell	Selected works of Geoffrey Trease	Golf clubs and balls
21 September 2014	Steve McQueen	The Fire Next Time by James Baldwin	Compass
28 September 2014	Marin Alsop	Collected Works of Carl Jung	Pottery studio
5 October 2014	Sally Wainwright	Female Fortune: Land, Gender and Authority by Jill Liddington	A small art shop full of goodies
12 October 2014	Sir Roy Strong	The Oxford Companion to the Garden by Patrick Taylor	His custom-built tricycle
19 October 2014	Debbie Wiseman	The Penguin of English Verse	Grand piano, music manuscript paper and pencil
26 October 2014	Roger Graef	Lost and Found in Russia by Susan Richards	A piano with six books of Bartok's Mikrokosmos
2 November 2014	Wendy Dagworthy	Raj Quartet by Paul Scott	A case of red lipstick and a fridge to keep it cool
14 November 2014	Captain Eric 'Winkle' Brown	The Moonlandings by Reginald Turnill	His 12 flight log books
16 November 2014	John Agard	The book of hours	A roll up of organic tobacco
23 November 2014	Theresa May MP	Pride and Prejudice by Jane Austen	A lifetime subscription to Vogue
30 November 2014	Damian Lewis	History of the World by J M Roberts	Whittling kit
7 December 2014	Julie Bentley	If Nobody Speaks of Remarkable Things by Jon McGregor	Her photo albums
14 December 2014	Sarah Millican	A survival book	Notebooks and pens
21 December 2014	The Most Reverend Justin Welby	The Decline and Fall of the Roman Empire by Edward Gibbon	The complete series of The West Wing on DVD
28 December 2014	Ray Winstone	The Searchers by Alan Le May	A fishing rod

== 2015 ==
Date	Castaway	Book	Luxury
4 January 2015	Professor Dame Nancy Rothwell	A Teach Yourself Swedish book	Sketchbooks and pencils
11 January 2015	Jo Malone	The Hundred-Foot Journey by Richard C Morais	Chanel lip gloss
18 January 2015	Dame Julia Cleverdon	The Penguin Complete Novels of Nancy Mitford	A 2,000 piece jigsaw of Venice
25 January 2015	Professor Peter Piot	The Complete works of Hugo Claus	An old English rose
1 February 2015	Professor Angie Hobbs	The collected works of W B Yeats	A harp with teach yourself books and plenty of strings
8 February 2015	Dan Pearson	An encyclopedia of the local plants	The contents of his potting shed
15 February 2015	Mark Rylance	The Big Red Book: The Great Masterpiece Celebrating Mystical Love and Friendship by Rumi	A stand up bass
22 February 2015	Jonas Kaufmann	Das Königsprojekt by Carl Amery	A coffee machine
1 March 2015	Julia Samuel	Other Men's Flowers: An Anthology of Poetry edited by A P Wavell	A notebook and a pen her mother gave her
8 March 2015	Bryan Stevenson	The Brothers Karamazov by Fyodor Dostoyevsky	A piano
15 March 2015	Robin Millar	West with the Night by Beryl Markham	The pyramid stage at Glastonbury, complete with the sound system, lights and a guitar
22 March 2015	Pat Albeck	Tess of the d'Urbervilles by Thomas Hardy	A desk with two drawers full of art materials
29 March 2015	Paul Hollywood	First Light by Geoffrey Wellum	Two pillows
10 May 2015	Sir Bradley Wiggins	Slaying the Dragon: How to Turn Your Small Steps to Great Feats by Michael Johnson	Family photo album
17 May 2015	Helen Browning	Long Walk to Freedom by Nelson Mandela	A David Lomax sculpture of Gaia carrying an ostrich egg behind her back
24 May 2015	Jimmy Wales	The Fountainhead by Ayn Rand	A cellar full of Cabernet wine and a glass
31 May 2015	Pamela Rose	Collected Poems of T.S. Eliot	A very comfortable four-poster bed with a mackintosh roof
7 June 2015	Lisa Jardine	The full 12 volumes of P.S Allen's Latin Letters of Erasmus of Rotterdam	Cooking utensils
14 June 2015	Rebecca Adlington	The Famous Five Collection by Enid Blyton	A pillow
21 June 2015	Stephen Fry	Four Quartets by T.S. Eliot	Canvasses, easels, brushes and an instruction manual
28 June 2015	Harry Rabinowitz	The Red and the Black by Stendhal	A pitch pipe
5 July 2015	Freddie Flintoff	To Kill a Mockingbird by Harper Lee	A family photo album
12 July 2015	Imtiaz Dharker	An atlas of the whole world	The Victoria and Albert Museum in London
19 July 2015	Noel Gallagher	On the Road by Jack Kerouac	Guitar and plectrum
26 July 2015	Professor Monica Grady	Ulysses by James Joyce	Flute
2 August 2015	Ruth Rogers	The River Cafe Classic Italian Cookbook by Rose Gray and Ruth Rogers	A bottle of extra virgin olive oil pressed at either Felsina or Fontodi vineyards
9 August 2015	Dr Bill Frankland	The Story of San Michele by Axel Munthe	Binoculars
20 September 2015	Dame Judi Dench	Other Men's Flowers by A P Wavell (audio book read by her daughter Finty Williams)	Cut-outs of all her friends and family
27 September 2015	Laurence Marks and Maurice Gran	The Complete Works of Evelyn Waugh (for Gran) and his own diaries (for Marks)	A really big drum kit (for Gran) and a collection of Château d'Yquem of his choice from 1900 to 2001, a fridge and Sauternes glasses (for Marks)
4 October 2015	Alison Balsom	The Complete Scores of Bach	Trumpet
11 October 2015	Lemn Sissay	The Koran	Pen and paper
18 October 2015	Professor Sue Black	Gray's Anatomy, 36th Edition	A big hat
25 October 2015	Keith Richards	Dr Dogbody's Leg by James Norman Hall	Machete
1 November 2015	Marjorie Wallace	Lives of the Poets: 1,000 Years of English & American Poetry by Louise Untermeyer	Cocktail cabinet
13 November 2015	Lord Indarjit Singh	The Bible	Paper and pens for drawing
15 November 2015	Nicola Sturgeon	The Complete Works of Jane Austen	A coffee machine
22 November 2015	Gurinder Chadha	Heer Ranjha translation by Professor Christopher Shackle	Home movies of her children
29 November 2015	Sandi Toksvig	The Ashley Book of Knots	An endless supply of the Daily Mail
6 December 2015	Atul Gawande	The Death of Ivan Ilyich by Leo Tolstoy	Pen and journal
13 December 2015	Kylie Minogue	The Outdoor Survival Handbook by Ray Mears	Family photo album
20 December 2015	Commander Chris Hadfield	Marks' Standard Handbook for Mechanical Engineers	Acoustic guitar
27 December 2015	Patricia Greene	Equal Rites by Terry Pratchett	A sack of bird food

== 2016 ==
Date	Castaway	Book	Luxury
3 January 2016	Colm Tóibín	The Portrait of a Lady by Henry James	Pen and paper
10 January 2016	Alex Crawford	To Kill a Mockingbird by Harper Lee	Scuba diving equipment
17 January 2016	Sir Anthony Seldon	A Collection of Joanna Seldon's short stories and poetry	A yoga and prayer mat
24 January 2016	Sigrid Rausing	Mansfield Park by Jane Austen	The British Library
31 January 2016	Bill Gates	The Better Angels of Our Nature by Steven Pinker	DVD Collection of Lectures from The Learning Company
7 February 2016	Professor Dame Carol Black	The Assassin's Cloak by Irene and Alan Taylor	Chanel No. 19
14 February 2016	Ben Saunders	The Worst Journey in the World by Apsley Cherry-Garrard	Pen and paper
21 February 2016	Dame Zaha Hadid	Delirious New York by Rem Koolhaas	Family photograph album
28 February 2016	Hugh Bonneville	A Tale of Two Cities by Charles Dickens	Lego with instruction booklets
6 March 2016	Dame Dr Sue Ion	A box set of Wainwright Walks in the Lake District	A guitar and a set of music
13 March 2016	Yinka Shonibare	Gulliver's Travels by Jonathan Swift	Pen and paper
20 March 2016	Gloria Steinem	The Color Purple by Alice Walker	Eye drops
27 March 2016	John Timpson	The Mayor of Casterbridge by Thomas Hardy	Paper and pen
8 May 2016	Tom Hanks	A World Lit Only by Fire by William Manchester	A Hermes 3000 manual typewriter and paper
15 May 2016	Inga Beale	The Last of the Mohicans by James Fenimore Cooper	Daily supply of warm, sweet, milky tea
22 May 2016	Berry Gordy	The Collected Works of Rudyard Kipling	A cellar of his favourite wine
29 May 2016	Professor Louise Richardson	The Collected Poems of Seamus Heaney	A champagne fountain
5 June 2016	David Nott	Kallimni 'Arabi Mazboot by Saimia Louis (a course in spoken Arabic)	Fishing rod
12 June 2016	Warwick Davis	The Guinness Book of Records	Pen and paper
19 June 2016	Barrie Rutter	Selected Poems of Tony Harrison	A pair of swimming flippers
26 June 2016	Sara Khan	The Great Theft: Wrestling Islam from the Extremists by Khaled M. Abou El Fadl	Yorkshire Tea
3 July 2016	Matthew Barzun	From Dawn to Decadence by Jacques Barzun	A kite surfing kit
10 July 2016	Nicole Farhi	À la recherche du temps perdu by Marcel Proust	None
17 July 2016	Levi Roots	Long Walk to Freedom by Nelson Mandela	A guitar
24 July 2016	Professor Dame Ann Dowling	The collected papers of Sir James Lighthill	An artist's studio
31 July 2016	Jilly Cooper	Oxford Dictionary of Quotations	A sack of nuts
7 August 2016	Michael Heath	Diary of a Nobody by George and Weedon Grossmith	Artist's painting set
14 August 2016	Nadiya Hussain	Me Before You by Jojo Moyes	Marmite
25 September 2016	Joyce DiDonato	The Power of One by Bryce Courtenay	Lavender scented oil
2 October 2016	Christiane Amanpour	The Complete Works of Eugene O'Neill	A guitar previously owned by Bruce Springsteen
9 October 2016	Stephen Hough	A bilingual edition of Proust's À la recherche du temps perdu	A panama hat from Optimo in Chicago
16 October 2016	Dr Robert Langer	The Iliad by Homer	A photo album of his family
23 October 2016	Jackie Kay	The Complete Works of Robert Burns	Self-filling hipflask of Islay malt whisky
30 October 2016	Michael Bublé	The Power of Now by Eckhart Tolle	A Rolex watch
6 November 2016	Ali Smith	Metamorphoses by Ovid	Palazzo Schifanoia in Ferrara
18 November 2016	Yotam Ottolenghi	A Suitable Boy by Vikram Seth	A lemon tree
20 November 2016	Nicola Adams	A Short History of Nearly Everything by Bill Bryson	A games console
27 November 2016	Emma Bridgewater	The Complete Works of Patrick O'Brian	Stephanotis bath oil with a bath
4 December 2016	Sir Philip Craven	Guide des vins: Bettane and Desseauve	Test Match Special archive
11 December 2016	Davina McCall	Still Life with Woodpecker by Tom Robbins	A bath
18 December 2016	Bruce Springsteen	Woody Guthrie: A Life by Joe Klein	A guitar
25 December 2016	Gareth Malone	A book to learn French	A piano

== 2017 ==
Date	Castaway	Book	Luxury
1 January 2017	Sir Kenneth Grange	Bauhaus by Hans Wingler	Pen and paper
8 January 2017	Pinky Lilani	The Forty Rules of Love by Elif Şafak	Darjeeling Tea with a teapot and a bone china mug
15 January 2017	Wayne McGregor	Diderot's Encyclopedia	Tatsuo Miyajima’s digital art work, ‘Life’
22 January 2017	Caitlin Moran	The Secret Diary of Adrian Mole, Aged 13¾ by Sue Townsend	A solar-powered laptop, not connected to the Internet
29 January 2017	David Beckham	On Fire by Francis Mallmann	His England caps
5 February 2017	Nigel Owens	The Wind in the Willows by Kenneth Grahame	Welsh tea
12 February 2017	June Brown	The Story of San Michele by Axel Munthe	Tobacco seeds
19 February 2017	Sir Antony Beevor	Fathers and Sons by Ivan Turgenev	A fishing rod and tackle
26 February 2017	Dame Katherine Grainger	Book of quotations	Archive of past Sunday papers
5 March 2017	Jimmy Carr	The Oxford Dictionary of Quotations	A coffee machine
12 March 2017	Marian Keyes	A book of cryptic crosswords	A photograph of her husband
19 March 2017	Amanda Levete	Museum without Walls by André Malraux	Lifetime supply of freshly laundered linen napkins
26 March 2017	Arundhati Roy	Hope Against Hope by Nadezhda Mandelstam	A Ratol Mango Tree
7 May 2017	Ed Sheeran	His Dark Materials by Philip Pullman	A lifetime supply of ketchup
14 May 2017	Liz Lochhead	Lying Under the Apple Tree by Alice Munro	Child's art set with paints, crayons and glitter and glue
21 May 2017	Demis Hassabis	The Lord of the Rings by J.R.R. Tolkien	A solar-powered chess computer
28 May 2017	Elif Shafak	Orlando by Virginia Woolf	A stationery cupboard
4 June 2017	Sonia Friedman	Oxford Book of English Verse	Cello
11 June 2017	Rick Wakeman	Principles of Orchestration by Nikolai Rimsky-Korsakov	Piano
18 June 2017	Jed Mercurio	The Road to Reality by Roger Penrose	A telescope
25 June 2017	Stella McCartney	Japanese Jailbird by Paul McCartney	A charm bracelet
2 July 2017	Professor Carlo Rovelli	The Odyssey by Homer	A telescope
9 July 2017	Sue Perkins	"How to Clone Your Dog"	Her deceased dog's hair
16 July 2017	John McEnroe	One Flew Over the Cuckoo's Nest by Ken Kesey	A vintage Martin acoustic guitar
23 July 2017	Jayne-Anne Gadhia	Les Miserables by Victor Hugo	A sari
30 July 2017	Sheryl Sandberg	A Wrinkle in Time by Madeleine L'Engle	A journal
6 August 2017	Dr Kevin Fong	A star atlas	A pair of binoculars
17 September 2017	Paul Greengrass	100 Years of Crystal Palace FC by Nigel Sands	A guitar and songbooks
24 September 2017	Professor Dame Jane Francis	A big encyclopaedia of plants of the world	Horseradish sauce
1 October 2017	Siddhartha Mukherjee	The Complete Works of George Orwell	A microscope
8 October 2017	Sir James MacMillan	The Selected Poems of Michael Symmons Roberts	His piano
15 October 2017	Jane Gardam	War and Peace by Leo Tolstoy	Paper and pens
22 October 2017	Edna Adan Ismail	Half the Sky by Nicholas Kristof	Vegetable seeds
29 October 2017	Kay Mellor	Jane Eyre by Charlotte Brontë	Coloured pens and paper
5 November 2017	Professor Phil Scraton	The Ragged Trousered Philanthropist by Robert Tressell	A guitar
17 November 2017	Anna Pavord	Dictionary of British And Irish Botanists And Horticulturists by Ray Desmond	Pen and paper
19 November 2017	Micky Flanagan	A dictionary of philosophy	A handheld vacuum cleaner
26 November 2017	Naomi Klein	The Backyard Astronomer's Guide by Terence Dickinson and Alan Dyer	A snorkel and mask
3 December 2017	Tim Martin	A Dance to the Music of Time by Anthony Powell	A surfboard
10 December 2017	Kelsey Grammer	A Passage to India by E.M. Forster	A magnifying glass
17 December 2017	Christine McVie	Henry VIII: King and Court by Alison Weir	Her piano
24 December 2017	Bruno Tonioli	One Hundred Years of Solitude by Gabriel García Márquez	A cellar of champagne

== 2018 ==
Date	Castaway	Book	Luxury
7 January 2018	Charlie Brooker	Galapagos by Kurt Vonnegut	Nintendo Switch games console
14 January 2018	Angela Hartnett	Emma by Jane Austen	Face cream
21 January 2018	Christina Lamb	For Whom the Bell Tolls by Ernest Hemingway	Paper and pencils
28 January 2018	Garry Kasparov	Master and Margarita by Mikhail Bulgakov	A telescope
4 February 2018	Jack Whitehall	The Wimbledon Poisoner by Nigel Williams	A tuxedo
11 February 2018	Chi-chi Nwanoku	Black Shamrocks by Gus Nwanokwu	An orthopaedic pillow
18 February 2018	Christopher Nolan	The Selected Fictions of Jorge Luis Borges	Projector and collection of old films
25 February 2018	Dame Minouche Shafik	A survival guide	Albums of her children
4 March 2018	Matt Smith	Birthday Letters by Ted Hughes	Endless supply of English breakfast tea
11 March 2018	John Gray	The Palm at the End of the Mind by Wallace Stevens	Endless supply of Marmite
18 March 2018	David Byrne	The River of Consciousness by Oliver Sacks	Set of Vietnamese cookery books
25 March 2018	Anne-Marie Duff	The Mill on the Floss by George Eliot	Gorgeous underwear
6 May 2018	Abi Morgan	The Complete Works of Proust	Her children's exercise books from school
13 May 2018	Sir Peter Lampl	The Complete Works of Robert Frost	Two cases of champagne
20 May 2018	Dr Sue Black	An A-Level maths book (and pencil)	Red hair dye
27 May 2018	David Baddiel	Rabbit Angstrom by John Updike	Giant slipper foot massager
3 June 2018	Gillian Reynolds	Hogarth, A Life and a World by Jenny Uglow	Endless supply of blended Scotch
10 June 2018	Professor Carlos Frenk	Collected Fictions by Jorge Luis Borges	A planetarium
17 June 2018	John Motson	The Catcher in the Rye by J. D. Salinger	Running shoes
24 June 2018	Martina Cole	Hatter's Castle by A. J. Cronin	Luxurious underwear
1 July 2018	Guy Singh-Watson	Far From the Madding Crowd by Thomas Hardy	Surfboard
8 July 2018	Philip Treacy	An encyclopedia of shells	A tailor's thimble
15 July 2018	Billie Jean King	Oh, the Places You'll Go! by Dr. Seuss	Scrapbook of photos of her family
22 July 2018	Baroness Newlove	War and Peace by Leo Tolstoy	Lipstick
29 July 2018	Marianne Elliott	Anthology of twentieth and twenty first century poetry written by women	Bath with 3 taps – hot water, cold water and wine
5 August 2018	Pam Ayres	The Oxford Book of Humorous Prose: From William Caxton to P.G. Wodehouse by Frank Muir	A medicine cabinet including mosquito repellent
16 September 2018	Danielle de Niese	The Great Gatsby by F. Scott Fitzgerald	A slide projector with all the photos she's ever taken of her loved ones
23 September 2018	Henry Marsh	Teach yourself Ukrainian book	His garden shed with tools in it
30 September 2018	Tom Daley	Harry Potter and the Philosopher's Stone by J. K. Rowling	An oven
7 October 2018	Thea Musgrave	An Anthology of World Poetry edited by Mark Van Doren	Two packs of playing cards
14 October 2018	Nile Rodgers	Moby-Dick by Herman Melville	His Hitmaker guitar and an amp
21 October 2018	Venki Ramakrishnan	The Feynman Lectures on Physics by Richard Feynman, Matthew Sands and Robert Leighton	His wife's grand piano
28 October 2018	Jacqueline Gold	The Secret by Rhonda Byrne	Her own feather pillow
4 November 2018	Vanley Burke	Encyclopedia of Tropical Plants by Ahmed Fayaz	A Machete and a Crocus bag
16 November 2018	Hella Pick	Scorn by Matthew Parris	Recliner armchair
18 November 2018	Tracey Thorn	War and Peace by Leo Tolstoy	Lipstick
25 November 2018	Kate Atkinson	The Collected Poems and Letters of Emily Dickinson	A 500-year-old, mature oak tree
2 December 2018	Tom Kerridge	White Heat by Marco Pierre White	A shaving kit
9 December 2018	Gary Barlow	Recording the Beatles by Kevin Ryan and Brian Kehew	Piano
16 December 2018	Mariana Mazzucato	Memoirs of Hadrian by Marguerite Yourcenar	One of her mother's handmade quilts
23 December 2018	Alan Carr	Argos catalogue	Foam roller

== 2019 ==
Date	Castaway	Book	Luxury
6 January 2019	Jeremy Deller	An A-Z London Street Atlas	A stretch of road over Hay Bluff between Hay-on-Wye and Abergavenny
13 January 2019	Ruth Jones	Halliwell’s Film Guide	The back catalogue of The Archers
20 January 2019	James Rebanks	The Old Man and the Sea by Ernest Hemingway	Pen and paper
27 January 2019	Wendy Cope	Compleet Molesworth by Geoffrey Willans	Pen and paper
3 February 2019	Bob Mortimer	My Secret History by Paul Theroux	His own pillow
10 February 2019	Cressida Dick	The Complete Works of Thomas Hardy	Endless supply of floral scented soaps
17 February 2019	Ann Cleeves	The Balkan Trilogy by Olivia Manning	Pen and paper
24 February 2019	Margaret MacMillan	À la Recherche du Temps Perdu by Proust	A machine to help her learn to sing
3 March 2019	Trevor Sorbie	All of Jeremy Clarkson’s books	A bottle of wine
10 March 2019	Dame Esther Rantzen	Poem for the Day with a Foreword by Wendy Cope	A bath – sometimes filled with hot water, sometimes cold water and sometimes champagne
17 March 2019	Marlon James	Tom Jones by Henry Fielding	A pressure cooker
24 March 2019	Jacqueline de Rojas	Rebecca by Daphne du Maurier	Saxophone
31 March 2019	Martin Freeman	Animal Farm by George Orwell	Tea-making facilities
12 May 2019	Louis Theroux	Remembrance of Things Past by Marcel Proust	40,000 piece jigsaw puzzle
19 May 2019	Pat McGrath	Andy Warhol: Polaroids by Richard B. Woodward	Makeup
26 May 2019	Derren Brown	The Collected Works of Carl Jung	Leica camera
2 June 2019	Lubaina Himid	Woman on the Edge of Time by Marge Piercy	An endless supply of self-ironing Japanese shirts
9 June 2019	Professor Monica McWilliams	Field Day Anthology of Irish Writing Volumes 4 and 5 (known as the Women’s anthology)	A snorkel
16 June 2019	Nitin Sawhney	The Fabric of Reality by David Deutsch	Desalinating bottle
23 June 2019	Emily Eavis	The Shadow of the Sun by Ryszard Kapuscinski	Carpenter’s tool set (so she can build her own veranda)
30 June 2019	Jared Diamond	The Complete Sherlock Holmes by Arthur Conan Doyle	Six cases of Scharzhofberger Kabinett, a Riesling wine from the Saar Basin
7 July 2019	Sue Biggs	The Book of Joy	A bed
14 July 2019	Marcus Wareing	A Bear Grylls’ Survival Guide	A knife
21 July 2019	John Cooper Clarke	Against Nature by Joris-Karl Huysmans	A boulder of opium twice the size of his head
28 July 2019	Dame Sally Davies	On Food and Cooking: The Science and Lore of the Kitchen by Harold McGee	Bubble bath
4 August 2019	Sir Tim Waterstone	Oxford Book of English Poetry	A photo of his wife
11 August 2019	Jo Fairley	Edible: An Illustrated Guide to the World's Food Plants	Her own pillow
22 September 2019	Thom Yorke	Zen Mind, Beginner's Mind by Shunryu Suzuki	A recording studio
29 September 2019	Sabrina Cohen-Hatton	The Old Man and the Sea by Ernest Hemingway	A photo album
6 October 2019	Lin-Manuel Miranda	Moby-Dick by Herman Melville	Coffee
13 October 2019	Baroness Arminka Helić	A DIY book	A pen and paper
20 October 2019	Dame Glenys Stacey	Oxford Book of English Short Stories	A selection of seeds
27 October 2019	Wendell Pierce	The Omni-americans: Black Experience And American Culture by Albert Murray	A multi-burner barbecue grill
3 November 2019	Russell T. Davies	Asterix and the Roman Agent by René Goscinny with illustrations by Albert Uderzo	A black Ball Pentol pen
15 November 2019	Kimberley Motley	1984 by George Orwell	Business card holder with photo of her children
17 November 2019	Stephen Graham	Jonathan Livingston Seagull by Richard Bach	His own pillow
24 November 2019	Isabella Tree	War and Peace by Leo Tolstoy	Mask, snorkel and a neoprene vest
1 December 2019	Asif Kapadia	The Autobiography of Malcolm X by Malcolm X and Alex Haley	A polaroid camera with unlimited film
8 December 2019	Professor Russell Foster	The collected works of Adrian John Desmond	A mask, snorkel, flippers and underwater camera
15 December 2019	Heidi Thomas	London Labour and the London Poor by Henry Mayhew	A hot water bottle
22 December 2019	Stephen Merchant	Roger's Profanisaurus by Viz and Roger Mellie	A piano

== 2020 ==
Date	Castaway	Book	Luxury
5 January 2020	Rupert Everett	Travels with My Aunt by Graham Greene	Vegetables
12 January 2020	Michael Lewis	A Confederacy of Dunces by John Kennedy Toole	A photo album
19 January 2020	Baroness Sue Campbell	Long Walk to Freedom by Nelson Mandela	A photo album
26 January 2020	Anne Enright	In Search of Lost Time by Marcel Proust	High thread-count cotton sheets
2 February 2020	Sonita Alleyne	Coming Through Slaughter by Michael Ondaatje	A genie in a lamp which would only work within the confines of the island
9 February 2020	Zoe Ball	A dictionary	A potting shed, gardening tools and seeds
16 February 2020	Ian Wright	The Curious Incident of the Dog in the Night-Time by Mark Haddon	A seven iron golf club and golf balls
23 February 2020	Melanie C	Dancing with Demons: The Authorised Biography of Dusty Springfield by Penny Valentine and Vicki Wickham	A Martin acoustic guitar
1 March 2020	Dorothy Byrne	Physics text books	The back catalogue of In Our Time / the voice of Melvyn Bragg
8 March 2020	Chris Riddell	Alice’s Adventures in Wonderland and Alice Through the Looking-Glass by Lewis Carroll, with the Tenniel illustrations	Sketchbooks and pens
15 March 2020	Daniel Radcliffe	The Norton Anthology of Poetry	Pencils and paper
22 March 2020	Dame Helena Morrissey	Much Obliged, Jeeves by P.G. Wodehouse	A grand piano
29 March 2020	Brian Cox	In Search of the Miraculous by P.D. Ouspensky	A sewing kit
10 May 2020	Simon Armitage	The Oxford English Dictionary	A tennis ball
17 May 2020	Sinéad Burke	Your Silence Will Not Protect You by Audre Lorde	A necklace
24 May 2020	Charles Hazlewood	A book of poetry by Ivor Cutler	An espresso machine
31 May 2020	Professor Dame Elizabeth Anionwu	Dreams From My Father by Barack Obama	A trampoline
7 June 2020	Martin Lewis	A Game of Thrones - The complete boxset of all 7 books (A Song of Ice and Fire) by George R.R. Martin	Solar powered electric carving knife
14 June 2020	Joe Wicks	Lord of the Flies by William Golding	An acoustic guitar
21 June 2020	Mark Johnston	The Count of Monte Cristo by Alexandre Dumas	A pair of binoculars
28 June 2020	Helen McCrory	The Complete Works of Spike Milligan	The Victoria and Albert Museum
5 July 2020	Helen Fielding	Pride and Prejudice by Jane Austen	A magical tree
12 July 2020	Jens Stoltenberg	A statistics textbook	A pair of skis
19 July 2020	Annie Nightingale	Catch-22 by Joseph Heller	A saxophone
26 July 2020	Sharon Horgan	The Sun Also Rises by Ernest Hemingway	A solar-powered word processor
2 August 2020	Steve Backshall	One Hundred Years of Solitude by Gabriel García Márquez	A guitar
9 August 2020	Maria Balshaw	Vickery’s Folk Flora: an A-Z of the Folklore and Uses of British and Irish Plants by Roy Vickery	A full set of flower and vegetable seeds
20 September 2020	Bernardine Evaristo	The Norton Anthology of Poetry	A hologram of her husband
27 September 2020	Yusuf Cat Stevens	The Masnavi I Ma'navi of Rumi: Complete by Jalalu-'d-din Muhammad Rumi	Bendicks Bittermints
4 October 2020	Samantha Morton	Light on Yoga: The Bible of Modern Yoga by B. K. S. Iyengar	A photograph of her children
11 October 2020	Baroness Floella Benjamin	Dreams From My Father by Barack Obama	A neck rest
18 October 2020	Professor Averil Mansfield	A book of poetry	A grand piano
25 October 2020	Chris Boardman	Feersum Endjinn by Iain M. Banks	Butter
1 November 2020	Hilary McGrady	A Poem for Every Day of the Year by Allie Asiri	Painting set and easel
13 November 2020	David Mitchell	A book of Chinese characters (Kanji)	A complete archive of Desert Island Discs
15 November 2020	Sir Keir Starmer	A very detailed Atlas	A football
22 November 2020	Arsène Wenger	Around the World in Eighty Days by Jules Verne	A ball
29 November 2020	Helen Oxenbury	The Empire Trilogy by J. G. Farrell	A bed with an unlimited supply of white linen sheets
6 December 2020	Professor Sir Jeremy Farrar	Other Men's Flowers: An Anthology of Poetry by A. P. Wavell	A cricket bowling machine
13 December 2020	Minette Batters	We're Going on a Bear Hunt by Michael Rosen and Helen Oxenbury	A loaf of bread
20 December 2020	Sir Cliff Richard	Wuthering Heights by Emily Brontë	A Gibson acoustic guitar
27 December 2020	Colonel Lucy Giles	A book by Agatha Christie	A jigsaw puzzle

== Notes ==
- Instead of the Bible: The Koran
- No Bible
- Instead of the Bible: The Torah
