= Frieda Barfus =

Australian Girl Guide executive

- Barfus from a 1968 issue of Matilda magazine
- Born: Frieda Victoria Barfus; 1892
- Died: 6 October 1968 (aged 75–76); Melbourne, Australia
- Other names: Yabinga, Barf
- Education: University of Melbourne

Frieda Barfus (1892 - 6 October 1968), also known as Yabinga (Elder Sister), was an Australian Girl Guiding pioneer and executive. She volunteered with the Guide International Service (GIS) in post-war Germany and was Guider-in-charge of The Ark in London in the 1950s.

== Personal life ==
She attended Brighton State School in Victoria, Australia and in 1907 earned a full scholarship for the Stott and Hoare's Business College, graduating in 1909. In 1911 she completed the Junior Public Exams at the University of Melbourne.

In the 1920s she was a teacher at Toorak College, Victoria, where she first heard about the Girl Guide movement. She also taught at Rockhampton Girls Grammar School. She eventually left her teaching career to join the Victoria Guides' headquarters.

In 1942 she joined the administration of the Australian Women's Land Army. After WWII, she was invited by the National Fitness Council to help run holiday camps as Warden-Matron for under privileged children at Point Lonsdale.

She moved to England in 1947 where she joined the Guide International Service (GIS) and was soon posted to Hanover, Germany. She was recalled to England the following year and worked at the GIS headquarters in London. When the GIS office closed in 1962, she returned to Australia.

== Girl Guides ==
Barfus's early Guiding career encompassed the following roles:

- Captain of 1st Toorak College Company, one of Australia's earliest Guide companies in Toorak, Victoria in 1920
- Head of training, Victoria Girl Guides
- Secretary to head of tests and badges, Victoria
- Captain, 1st Melbourne Ranger company
- Camp advisor, Victoria Girl Guides
- Chair, Ranger committee, Victoria
- Assistant State secretary, GGA

In the 1930s, Barfus was a regular contributor to Victoria Girl Guiding's magazine, Matilda and would write regular Guiding columns for The Age, a Melbourne newspaper.

In 1935 she was sponsored by the Western Suburbs Division to travelled to Perth, Western Australia to deliver a series of training sessions and camps. While there she spoke about the Great Depression and its impact on Guiding saying, "[Guiding] has given them something to hang on to – congenial companions and in many cases the work they have learned while guiding has stood them in good stead."

She played a significant role in the development of Victoria Guide House and was awarded the Beaver "for exceptionally good service to the movement" in 1937 for her efforts.

Within the Guiding community Barfus was known as Yabinga which, according to her obituary in The Guider magazine, is Aboriginal for "elder sister". It was chosen for her at a Guide camp in 1927.

=== Guide International Service (GIS) ===
Barfus joined the Guide International Service (GIS) as a volunteer in 1947 after passing "a rigorous test" in Australia. She travelled to Germany, via England, to perform welfare work with 136 Team. She subsequently joined the GIS office in London and made frequent speeches about GIS and its work. As the relief efforts in Germany slowed down, she turned her attention to the GIS "adoption scheme". This scheme took displaced people who could not be relocated overseas because of ill health and put them in touch with "sympathisers" in the UK. Barfus created over 1,000 "adoptions", many of which were still in place at the time of her death. After the GIS disbanded in 1954 Barfus took on the task of "sorting thousands and thousands of papers" deciding which to destroy and which to archive.

=== The Ark and Olave House ===
When Barfus' work with GIS wound down, she was appointed Guider-in-charge at Our Ark, the first GGA world centre in London. She held this position from 1953 to 1959. During this period she oversaw The Ark's move from Palace Street to Earl's Court, where it was renamed Olave House. Once it was up and running, she retired and returned to Australia in 1962 but remained involved with the Guiding movement, as a member of the VGGSC and the Trefoil Guild, where she gave many talks about the GIS.

=== Return to Australia ===
After returning to Australia in 1962, she joined the Victorian Girl Guides State Council. After Barfus died a memorial fund was established by the Australian Girl Guides Association.
