= Berini =

Berini is a surname. Notable people with the surname include:

- Clément Bérini (1930–1996), Franco-Ontarian visual artist
- Maria Elena Berini (born 1944), Italian Catholic nun

The term may also refer to:

- Berini, a village in Sacoșu Turcesc Commune, Timiș County, Romania
