= Scouting and Guiding in Mexico =

Scouting and Guiding movement in Mexico

The Scouting and Guiding movement in Mexico consists of several independent organizations.

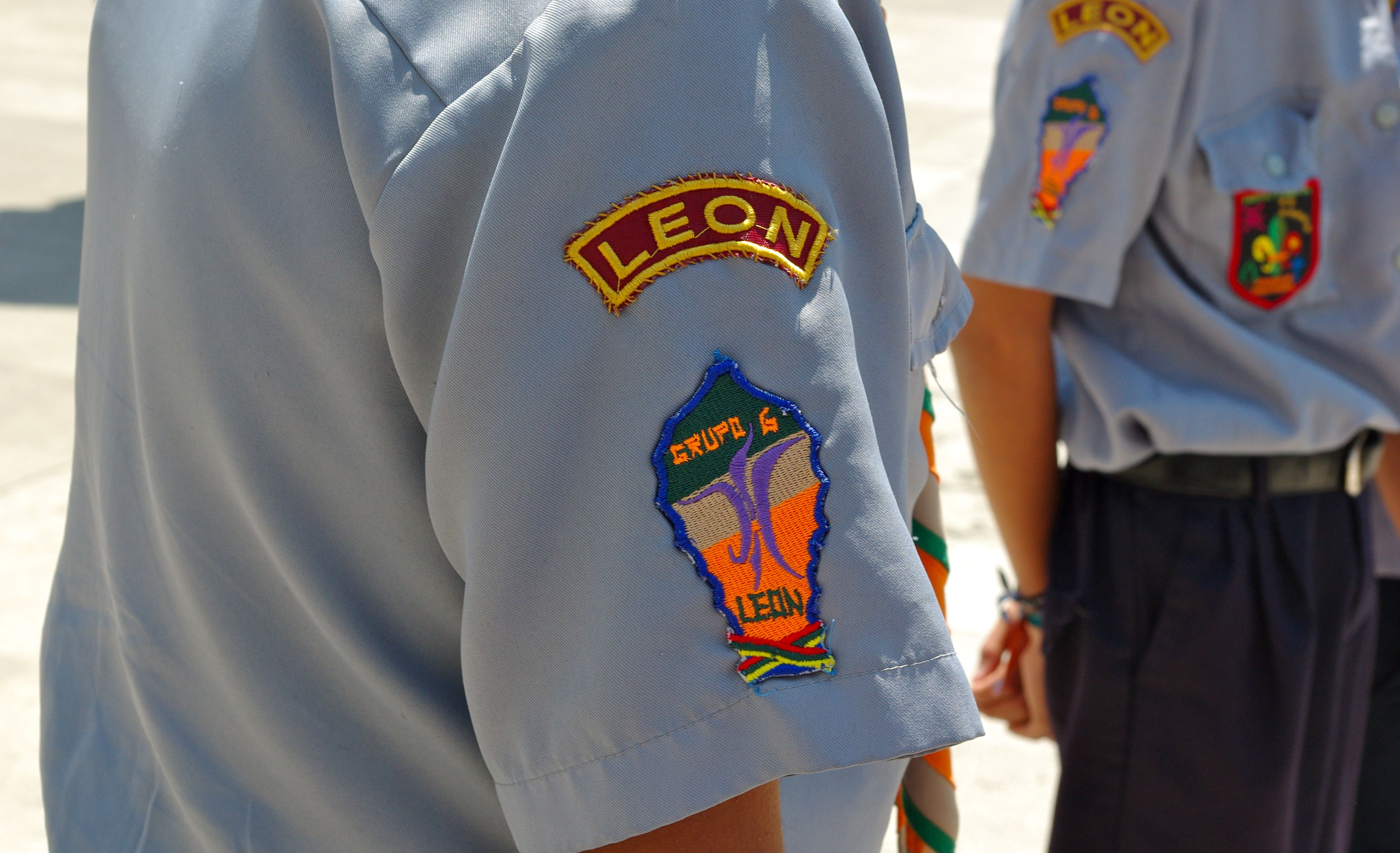
Shoulder patches of adult Scout leaders in Mexico City, March 2010

Asociación de Grupos de Scouts de México

== Organizations ==
- Asociación de Scouts de México, Asociación Civil, member of the World Organization of the Scout Movement
- Guías de México, member of the World Association of Girl Guides and Girl Scouts
- Agrupación Scout Mexicana, A. C., a member of the World Federation of Independent Scouts
- Federación Mexicana de Scouts Independientes, A. C., a member of the World Federation of Independent Scouts
  - Scouts y Guías Baden Powell, A. C.
  - independent local groups
- Scouts Mexicanos, A. C., member of the Order of World Scouts
- Asociación de Grupos de Scouts de México, A.C..

== International Scouting in Mexico ==
- WAGGGS' World Centre Our Cabaña, in Cuernavaca, Mexico, opened in 1957. In addition, there are American Boy Scouts in Mexico City and Chihuahua, linked to the Direct Service branch of the Boy Scouts of America, which supports units around the world.
