= Guías de México =

National Guiding organization of Mexico

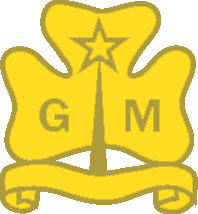
- Guides of Mexico
- Country: Mexico
- Founded: 1930
- Membership: 5,196
- Affiliation: World Association of Girl Guides and Girl Scouts
- Website http://www.guiasdemexico.org.mx/

Brownie	Guide

Guías de México (Guides of Mexico) is the national Guiding organization of Mexico. It serves 5,196 members (as of 2008). Founded in 1930, the girls-only organization became an associate member of the World Association of Girl Guides and Girl Scouts in 1948 and a full member in 1957. WAGGGS' world centre Our Cabaña, in Cuernavaca, Mexico, opened in 1957.

== Program ==
The association is divided in 6 sections according to age:

- Girasoles - ages 4 to 7
- Haditas - ages 7 to 10
- Guías - ages 10 to 13
- Guías intermedias - ages 13 to 16
- Guías mayores - ages 16 to 21
- Cadetes - ages 19+

== Ticalli ==
Ticalli ("Your Home" in Nahuatl language) is a hotel opened to Girl Guides and Girl Scouts from all over the world. Accommodation is in dormitories or double rooms and there are five bathroom units. This allows Guías de México to receive 60 Girl Guides and Girl Scouts at a time. The Guide shop and National Headquarters are also located on the same premises.

== See also ==
- Scouting in Mexico
- Our Cabaña
