= Hettie Smith =

English Girl Guide leader, Music Advisor to the Girl Guides Association (1917–2010)

- Smith from a 1972 Guiding magazine
- Born: Henrietta Grace Smith; 3 September 1916; Kent, England
- Died: 2 July 2010 (aged 93); Bath, Somerset, England
- Education: Saffron Waldon College
- Occupations: Conductor, editor, music advisor to Girl Guides Association

Hettie Smith (3 September 1917 - 2 July 2010) was a choral director for the Girl Guides Association (GGA) and compiler of several songbooks, including Canciones De Nuestra Cabaña (1980). She was music advisor to the GGA from 1967 to 1972.

== Personal life and education ==
Henrietta Grace Smith was born in Kent to Raymond Smith and Henrietta Langley. She was evacuated to Bath during WWI. After the war she grew up in Plumstead, London and attended the John Roan School. She trained as a teacher at the Saffron Waldon College. At the start of WWII she returned to Bath as a music teacher at Royal School, Lansdown. She lived in Bath until the 1980s when she moved to North Wales. In lieu of flowers at her funeral, donations were made to Girlguiding Somerset North and WaterAid.

== Girl Guides ==
While in Bath, Smith was involved in “almost every aspect of Guiding”, including Brownies, Guides and secretarial work. Her roles included:

- 1960s: Somerset County music advisor - HQ singing instructor
- 1961: Standing Camps of Canada (Ontario) - singing instructor
- 1967 - 1972: Headquarters training team - arts and music advisor for England
- 1969: Commonwealth music advisor
- 1972: Training committee, chair, Girl Guide Association music consultant

She was active in the music making at Foxlease Guide centre, Hampshire and on the committee of Friends of Our Cabaña.

=== Recordings ===
Smith was involved in the following BBC albums:

- Sing Along with the Girl Guides (1971) - conductor
- National Guide Festival of Song (1972) - producer
- Get Together: Children’s Songs with a Message (1973) – conductor (with Marion Prior)
- What Can I Do? (1975) - director
- Come On and Sing with the Girl Guides (1975) - sleeve notes

=== Publications ===
- Diamond Jubilee Songbook. London, UK: Girl Guides Association. 1970. Compiler
- Girl Guide Song Book 1 & 2. London, UK: Girl Guides Association. 1974. Editor
- Musical Fun with the Brownie pack. London, UK: Girl Guides Association. 1976. ISBN 0852600739. Illustrated by Jennetta Vise
- Canciones De Nuestra Cabaña (Songs from Our Cabaña). New York, USA: Girl Scouts of the USA. 1980. ISBN 9780884413660. Editor
