= Gray Ladies =

Former American Red Cross volunteers

The Gray Ladies were American Red Cross volunteers who worked in American hospitals, other health care facilities, and private homes, notably during World War I and World War II. They provided friendly, personal, non-medical services to sick, injured or disabled patients.

They wrote letters, read, tutored and shopped for patients, and served as guides to visitors and as hostesses in hospital recreation rooms and at information desks. Gray Ladies also provided hospitality services in Red Cross Blood Centers and joined forces with other Red Cross workers in caring for disaster victims.

== History ==
The Red Cross Hostess and Hospital Service and Recreation Corps, known as "Gray Ladies", started in 1918 at the Walter Reed Army Hospital in Washington, D.C., providing services for war patients. Their name came from their signature uniform of a gray dress and veil. It wasn't until after World War II in 1947 that the program became officially known as the Gray Lady Service.

The Gray Lady Service program was disbanded in the 1960's and absorbed into a more unified volunteer services program within the American Red Cross.

=== Notable Gray Ladies ===
- Selena Sloan Butler, President of the National Congress of Colored Parents and Teachers Association
- Ella Virginia Houck Holloway, President National of the U.S. Daughters of 1812
- Louisa E. Rhine, botanist
- Bernice Stern, politician
- Eleanor Stewart, actress
- Clementine Tangeman, philanthropist
