= Our Chalet =

International Girl Guide/Girl Scout world center in the Bernese Alps of Switzerland

- Owner: WAGGGS
- Location: Adelboden, Bernese Oberland
- Country: Switzerland
- Coordinates: 46°29′15″N 7°34′30″E
- Founded: 31 July 1932
- Founder: Helen Storrow
- Website https://www.wagggs.org/en/our-world/world-centres/our-chalet/

Our Chalet is an international Girl Guide/Girl Scout centre and one of five World Centres of the World Association of Girl Guides and Girl Scouts (WAGGGS). The others are Our Cabaña, Sangam, Kusafiri and Pax Lodge. Our Chalet is just outside Adelboden, in the Bernese Oberland of Switzerland. Located in the Bernese Alps, it is 1,350 metres (4,430 ft) above sea level.

Our Chalet, founded by Helen Storrow, opened in 1932. Our Chalet offers year-round activities, special events, and conferences for Girl Guides, Girl Scouts, and leaders from around the world. In the time since it opened, the centre has been expanded and now includes several buildings. It has only been closed to the public twice, once during World War II when it was used as a military training and refugee centre and another time due to COVID-19.

== History ==
In 1929, WAGGGS met in the Netherlands and decided to build a World Centre for Girl Guides and Girl Scouts worldwide. An American Girl Scout leader, Helen Storrow (1864–1944), agreed to fund the construction and the first four years of operation if it were built in Switzerland. Helped by Swiss Scout Ida Von Herrenschwand (1887–1961), also known as "Falk", Storrow found several possible locations, including Grindelwald, which had unsuitable ground; Kandersteg, which already had the Kandersteg International Scout Centre; and Aeschi. Favoured by Storrow for its beauty, Aeschi was proposed at a conference at Foxlease, UK. It almost passed, but Falk felt it was too low for the sort of adventure that young girls were looking for and Robert Baden-Powell, founder of Scouting, agreed.

After more discussion, the conference agreed upon several important conditions. The site had to be near a main train line, but away from tourists. Hotels in the neighbourhood were also required, yet it could not be a fashionable place. The site had to be high enough for skiing in the winter and climbing in the summer while still suitable for those with heart trouble. It was also agreed that there should be sufficient ground around and pleasant neighbours.

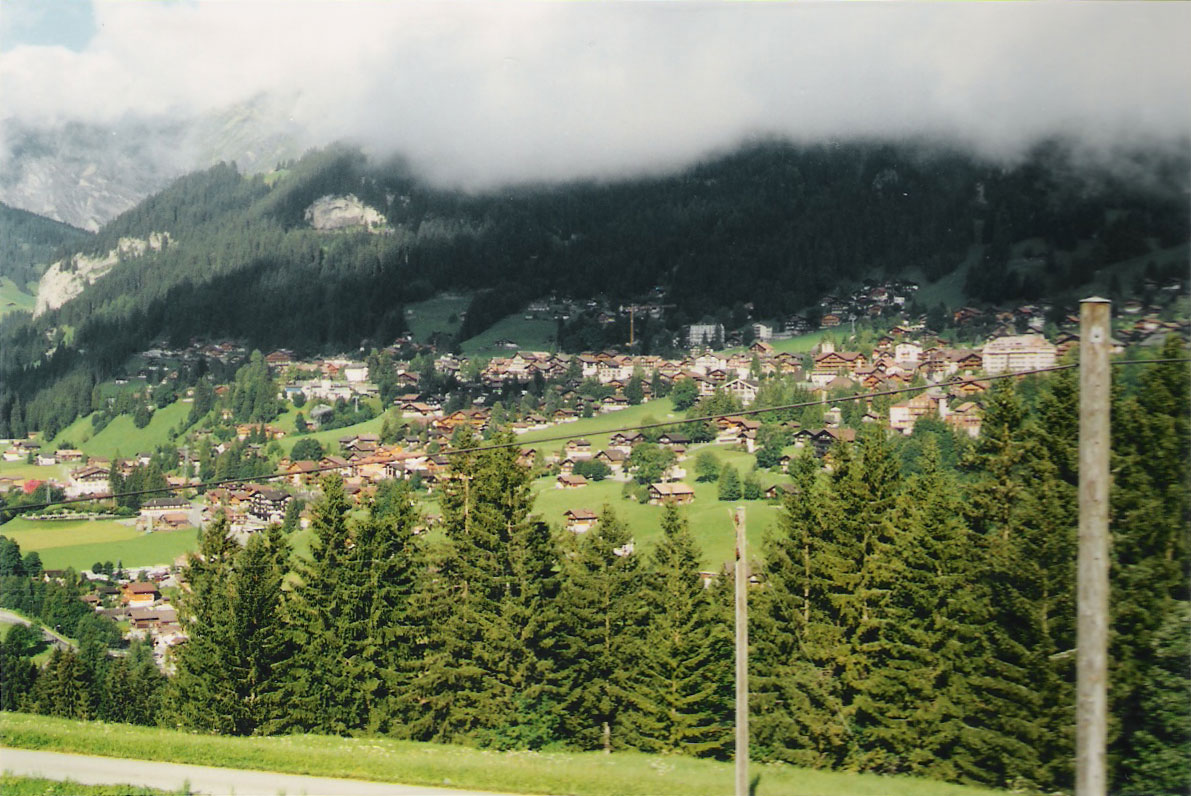
Adelboden as seen from Our Chalet

Falk continued searching and found Adelboden, which she felt would be perfect. The contracts to buy the desired land from three farmers were signed in December 1930. In June 1931, Storrow and the World Committee of WAGGGS came to inspect the site, which they approved. The name Our Chalet was chosen so that every Girl Guide or Scout would feel it was her home.

Construction of Our Chalet began with the basement in September 1931, and the roof was built on 21 December 1931, according to plans by architect M. von Sinner. Storrow returned in May 1932 to see the completed chalet, prompting Falk and others to hold a party at a village inn to celebrate the strong bond that remains to this day between the chalet and villagers. Storrow then decided that she wanted a separate, smaller house of her own where she could stay and receive guests to be ready in time for the official opening of Our Chalet. Named "Baby Chalet", it is still open to guests.

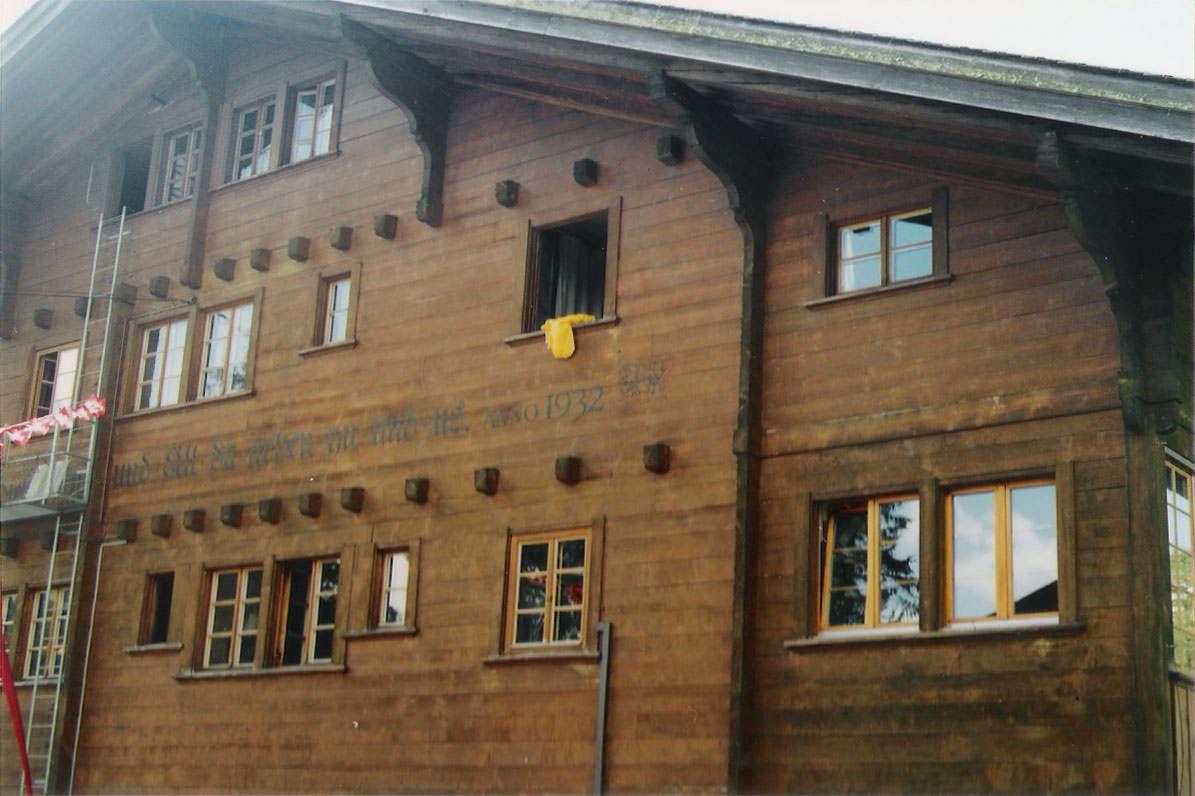
The original Chalet with traditional building dedication

The formal opening for both Chalets was on 31 July 1932 by Storrow and Olave Baden-Powell with many villagers, Girl Guides and Girl Scouts from around the world, and Robert Baden-Powell in attendance. Falk became the World Centre's first "Guider in Charge".

The original plan was for Our Chalet to be open during the summer and for a brief winter holiday, but it was so popular that it soon opened to support the year-round demand.

Our Chalet was used immediately after its formal opening. First there was a meeting of the World Committee, and then sixteen girls from eight countries stayed for a fortnight at the invitation of the Committee of the Juliette Low Memorial Fund, named after Juliette Gordon Low, the founder of the Girl Scouts of the USA. Many of today's traditions are from the first year of operation.

=== World War II ===
On 24 August 1939 Our Chalet was full of Guides from all over Europe. A group of Guides set out for nearby Kandersteg, but the clouds of war compelled Falk to recall them, as she was responsible for their safe return. An all-out effort managed to return the Guides by 4 pm, despite significant protests. Falk's concerns were shown to be well-founded when World War II broke out eight days later. Our Chalet's staff quickly set upon the often difficult task of returning guests/ tourists to their home countries.

During World War II, the centre was closed to regular guests, but the staff became involved in reuniting refugees, many of whom had Guiding and Scouting connections. The centre was also used for training military skiers and interning foreigners. The Swiss Guides were the only Guides who were able to use Our Chalet during the war, except for some French Guiding Commissioners who showed up in 1942. Many refugees came to Switzerland during the war and the staff tried to accommodate them in Our Chalet, but this was not allowed in most cases due to wartime regulations. However, the staff did help them with relief funds from the Guides and Scouts of Switzerland, Great Britain, and the United States. The Our Chalet staff found great joy in helping reunite families who had been divided by war. American Girl Scouts also donated substantial funds to Our Chalet in 1944, through the U.S.A. Friendly Fund, to help with postwar recovery efforts.

Also in 1944, Storrow died, leaving open the position of chairman. It was filled by Anne Hyde Choate, another American and past president of the Girl Scouts of the USA.

=== After the war ===
The leader of all Girl Guides and Girl Scouts, World Chief Guide Olave Baden-Powell, wasted no time helping rebuild Guiding in Europe after the war was over. She was at Our Chalet on VE Day, 7 May 1945, to reopen Our Chalet. Despite hardships obtaining travel visas after the war, Our Chalet was swamped with visit requests.

Conferences began again in 1946, with a Juliette Low conference held in July and an International Conference for Trainers in August. The first Germans, six leaders concerned about the nature of their welcome, arrived in 1948 and were treated like everyone else. The newly created Friends of Our Chalet fund helped with the remaining recovery efforts.

=== After Falk ===
Our Chalet's 20th anniversary was in 1952. A huge birthday celebration was held, resulting in the first financial loss. Falk retired that year, to be replaced by Penelope "Pen" Wood-Hill (later Cullingford), from the United Kingdom. 1952 also saw the visit of the 10,000 guest.

As Our Chalet's popularity grew, so did need for more facilities. In June 1956, a new building, "Stöckli", was opened for staff use. In the Canton of Bern, Stöckli is the name given to the house by the main farmhouse where the older generation of farmers live. Pen and the World Chief Guide were present. Our Chalet also held the first Ranger Adventure Week this month.

The Falk Fund was established in Falk's memory after she died in the autumn of 1961. WAGGGS member associations can apply for a "Falk Holiday" to permit one or more of their members to stay at Our Chalet as a thank you for years of good service, an exceptionally well-done job, or because they were handicapped.

Pen retired 29 June 1968, and was replaced by Inge Lyck, from Denmark. Lyck introduced more challenging outdoor excursions to the programme and re-introduced the concept that each year would have a theme to tie all the activities together. In the autumn of 1968, Olave Baden-Powell made what would be her last visit to Our Chalet.

Our Chalet's 40th anniversary was celebrated on 30 July 1972.

By 1972, over 33,000 people had visited Our Chalet. Many improvements were made to the building and the grounds in the 1970s. Toward the end of the decade, Our Chalet began a fund to join the community sewage, which was eventually used in September and October 1986. During the 1970s, cross country skiing in Adelboden became more popular, and in 1978 the "Chalet Challenge" award (see Activities), which is only available to Our Chalet visitors, was established.

Isabelle Dufour of Switzerland replaced Inge in 1975, and was in turn replaced by Hanna Newport, also of Switzerland, in April 1980 when she returned to nursing. In the spring of 1982, Our Chalet replaced the stone roof with a new insulated one to cut down how much heat escaped and prevent huge icicles from forming. In August 1983, five of the sixteen girls from the 1933 Juliette Low Memorial Fund group returned for their 50th anniversary and placed a plaque on the tree they had planted outside the library window. Newport left early in 1987 and Gwen Smith of the United Kingdom filled in until December 1987, when Maha Salhani of Lebanon took over.

In the late 1980s, many of the walking sessions had to be cancelled due to lack of interest. The staff noticed that whereas in earlier years luggage was hauled by hand-cart, taxis were all that were used by this time. In the summer of 1986, Swiss law changed and banned underground oil tanks, which Our Chalet had. In 1988 Our Chalet had saved the funds to move the tanks to a new cellar under the kitchen porch.

In 1990, the World Conference in Singapore gave permission for Our Chalet to build a new house to provide extra guest accommodation, conference facilities and office space. The new building, "Spycher", was officially opened in September 1999. There was extremely low attendance in 1991 because of low snowfall and the Gulf War. On World Thinking Day in 1998, Our Chalet became the first World Centre to launch its own web site.

Salhani served as Guider-in-Charge until 1992, when she was replaced by Gweneth Smith of the United Kingdom. Smith had been a staff member at Our Chalet since 1973 and worked with four Guiders-in-Charge as a secretary and ski instructor. Katharina Kalscics, of Austria, took over as Guider-in-Charge in 1997 and served until 2000. After Katharina departed, Ellie Duis was Acting Centre Manager, ensuring the smooth running of the centre until the arrival of Peter Neurauter, from the United Kingdom, who served as Guider-in-Charge from the end of 2000 to 2005. He was followed by Lars Bo Petersen from Denmark who served as Guider-in-Charge from 2006. In 2009 the title was changed to World Centre Manager and filled by Sally Thornton of Australia. From 2013 to the current day, this post is filled by Tanya Tulloch of USA.

Yvonne "Cigogne" Cuénod (1900–1993), a Swiss Girl Guide Executive, was involved with Our Chalet for 61 years, from the beginning in 1932 until her death in 1993, and a staff member until 1953. She helped set up the original furnishings, regularly attended meetings, helped with cleaning, organised events, and handled relations with the local community. She was one of the three trainers at the first International Training Course for Guiders in 1932.

=== Present ===
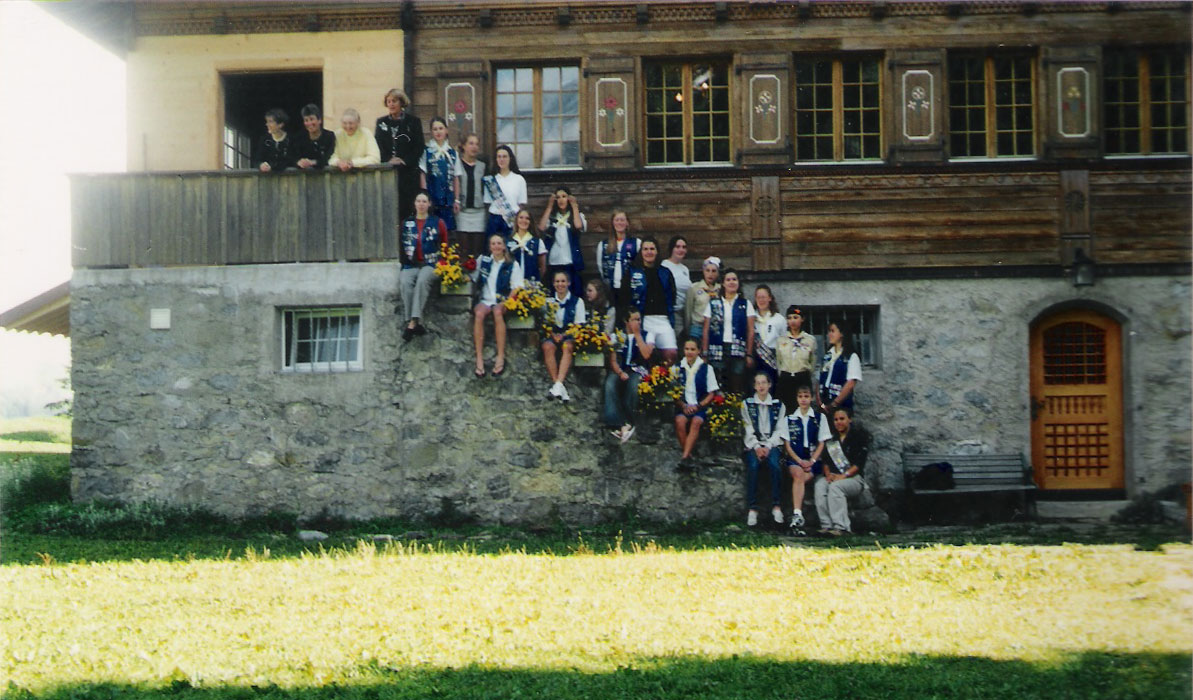
Girl Scouts and Guides visiting Our Chalet during a Wider Opportunity

In recent years, an increasing number of non-Scout guests are taking advantage of Our Chalet, particularly skiers during the winter. These non-Scout guests learn about the international Guiding Movement from the Girl Guide and Girl Scout guests.

In 2007, over 400 guests from around the world visited Our Chalet to celebrate the centre's 75th birthday. Special activities for the big event included tours, interactive displays on the history of Girl Scouts, Girl Guides, and the centre itself, performances by local groups, campfire songs, and a fireworks display.

== Activities ==
Summer activities are available at Our Chalet from June to September. During this time the Swiss Challenge event is offered to young adults who come to experience a week of alpine fun, including town visits, hikes, zip lining, climbing and evening programmes. Summertime activities include walking and hiking, adventure activities such as the Reharti Adventure Park and whitewater rafting, and evening programmes.

Winter activities at Our Chalet run from December through April. These activities include skiing, snowboarding, snowshoeing, snowtubing, cross country skiing, winter walking, ice skating, curling, ice climbing, tobogganing, sit skiing, tailing, sleigh rides, and various night activities, among others. Adelboden is also known for skiing and hosts the International Ski Federation (FIS).

In addition to World Thinking Day and the FIS Alpine Skiing World Cup being special events at Our Chalet and Adelboden, New Year's Eve and Our Chalet's birthday are also major events. The Our Chalet birthday is 31 July and it is celebrated in conjunction with 1 August, which is the day Switzerland became a confederation in 1291.

The "Chalet Challenge" is offered to guests staying at Our Chalet, helping participants gain personal confidence, inner strength and a sense of self-worth. Activities include learning Swiss German, music, learning about WAGGGS, hiking, and adventure.

=== Past events ===
Many major events have occurred at Our Chalet and in Adelboden, such as the Quo Vadis Council of 1933 for national and international Guiding leaders, World Committee conferences, and International Training seminars. In 1934, the first International Brownie Training, for training leaders of young girls, was held at the Chalet and the eighth World Conference, for Guiding leaders, took place at the Hotel Regina in Adelboden. The first Round Table of Trainers, for training people who do training, was held at Our Chalet in 1935. In the late 1930s, an International Ranger Conference—for Guides involved in high adventure programs, a Round Table for Ranger Captains—for Ranger leaders, a Round Table for Brown Owls—for leaders of the young girls' Brownie program, and more Quo Vadis Councils were held. In 1938 the tenth World Conference was held in Adelboden. By the time the second Round Table of Trainers was held in the spring of 1939, people knew it might be the last major international event for a while as the storm clouds of war were gathering. In August 1986, the first Helen Storrow Seminar was held. Each Helen Storrow Seminar focuses on a different theme, such as the rights and responsibilities of women or how women can fight HIV and AIDS.

=== Juliette Low Seminars ===
The Juliette Low Seminars are named in her honour and provide international leadership training to young women from any WAGGGS member organisation. The first one was held on 6 August 1932 at Our Chalet. They were not held during World War II, but began again at Our Chalet in July 1946 and were held there until 1968, when they began rotating around all five world centres. Originally, they were held annually but are now held twice every three years. The seminars are intended to help young women share views and experiences, while preparing for world leadership.

== Accommodations ==
The primary accommodations are the Main Chalet and Spycher Chalet. There are also smaller private chalets and a camp ground that is open from early summer to autumn. There are a variety of sleeping arrangements in the primary chalets. Spycher is wheelchair accessible. There are also many facilities for seminars, training, and conferences. There are single, twin, and shared rooms available. Shared rooms sleep up to seven people. Dormitory rooms are available in the Main Chalet and Spycher Chalet. Squirrel House accommodates two groups, one upstairs of up to ten people and one downstairs of up to six people. Baby Chalet sleeps three people. Camping facilities and Edelweisshütte Camp House are available for camping.
