= Clementine Tangeman =

American philanthropist

- Clementine Tangeman from a 1996 newspaper
- Born: Elizabeth Clementine Miller; 17 February 1905; Columbus, Indiana, USA
- Died: 17 January 1996 (aged 90); Columbus, Indiana, USA
- Other names: Clemmie; Mrs Robert Tangeman
- Education: Emma Willard School, Smith College
- Occupations: Philanthropist, hymnologist
- Spouse: Robert Stone Tangeman (m. 1951)
- Family: J. Irwin Miller (brother)

Clementine Tangeman (17 February 1905 - 17 January 1996) was an American philanthropist, who inherited a fortune from her family's business, the Cummins Engine Company. She was a lifelong member of the Girl Scout movement and became Vice President of the World Association of Girl Guides and Girl Scouts (WAGGGS). She co-edited and published Christian Hymns in 1945, a hymnal still in use today.

== Personal life and education ==
Clementine was born to mother Nettie Irwin Sweeney (1876–1960), a philanthropist and father Hugh Thomas Miller (1867–1947), a college professor, politician and director of the Cummins Engine Company (founded 1919) which made diesel engines, engine components and power systems. She had one brother, J. Irwin Miller. Clementine attended Columbus Public School before moving to Emma Willard School, New York, graduating in 1923. There, she received a prize for the highest score for the General Information Test. She then attended Smith College, graduating in 1927 with a degree in history.

She married Robert Tangeman, a musicologist at Union Theological Seminary, in 1951. In 1966 they had a summer house built near the Muskoka Lakes, Ontario, designed by Harry Weese. The house included an electric ferry, which shuttled visitors to and from the mainland.

In 1989 Tangeman and her brother repurchased over one million Cummins Engine Company shares from Hanson Plc, who were planning a potential takeover of the company.

== World War II ==
At the start of WWII, Clementine volunteered with Bundles for Britain and Bundles for America. When the US entered the war, she worked with the Columbus Red Cross, recruiting members for a chapter of Gray Ladies, volunteers who would provide non-medical care to patients. At a Girl Scout meeting she was challenged by other leaders to serve overseas. She attended training in Washington, D.C. and Camp Patrick Henry before joining the 5th Army's 15th Evacuation Hospital. She served in North Africa, Sicily and Italy, including Anzio beachhead, and in hospitals in Naples, Rome and Florence.

On the subject of volunteering, Tangeman said, "Find a cause that challenges your imagination and kindles your enthusiasm, and then give it your best thought and effort and stick with it."

== Boards of directors ==
Tangeman served on many boards of directors and other governance committees, including:

- Emma Willard School, first female president of the board in 1965
- American Red Cross
- Butler University
- The Christian Foundation – president
- Christian Theology Seminary
- Girl Scouts of the USA
- Irwin-Sweeney-Miller Foundation – chairwoman
- The Rockefeller University Council – member
- Smith College

== Philanthropy ==
In 1971, together with her brother and his wife, she donated US$2,000,000 to the development of the public part of The Commons, a mall in Bartholomew County, Indiana. They initially offered to cover the maintenance costs for two years, but eventually covered the costs for the first thirty years. The donation included a kinetic sculpture by Jean Tinguely.

== Girl Scouts ==
Tangeman joined a Girl Scout troop as a leader in 1936. She would maintain a relationship with the movement for the next sixty years. After returning from Italy in 1945, she joined the International Division of the Girl Scouts' national headquarters in New York. In the early 1950s, she served as chair of the Bartholomew County Girl Scout Association.

=== World Association of Girl Guides and Girl Scouts (WAGGGS) ===
Tangeman was instrumental in raising funds to build Nuestra Cabaña, WAGGGS' third World Centre in Cuernavaca, Mexico. The fundraising effort took ten years, and the centre was completed in 1957.

Tangeman was a member of the WAGGGS World Committee in the late 1950s, subsequently becoming vice president. She founded the World Foundation for Girl Guides and Girl Scouts in 1971 and was a founding member of the Olave Baden-Powell Society in 1984.

In 1995, more than one hundred Girl Scouts and their leaders serenaded Tangeman to mark her 90th birthday.

== Irvin-Sweeney-Miller Foundation ==
Tangeman was president of the Irvin-Sweeney-Miller Foundation where she led activities and awarded grants “in a search for solutions to problems faced by youths and the disadvantaged in Bartholemew County.”

== Institute of Sacred Music, Yale University ==
In 1974 Tangeman, together with her brother and the Irwin-Sweeney-Miller Foundation, helped to establish the Institute of Sacred Music at Yale University with a grant of US$10,000. In a letter accompanying the grant they wrote: "Out of what context does our interest in an Institute of Worship, Music and the Related Arts arise? It rises out of our concern for the needs of the spirit among people living today; out of our own Christian convictions; and out of our belief in the importance of the arts (especially music) as valid and compelling means of transmitting to men and women the essence of the Christian Gospel." Tangeman would visit the institute regularly, flying "into town on the company jet."

== Music ==
Tangeman was an accomplished musician, playing the violin, and hymnologist. Together with E. Wayne Berry and Edwin Reader Erritt, she co-edited the hymnal Christian Hymns in 1945. It remains in use at First Christian Church, Columbus, where for many years she was a Sunday school teacher.

== Clubs and societies ==
Tangeman was a member of the Windermere Golf and Country Club from its inception in 1919. A memorial garden at the first tee honours Tangemen and Jean Stephens, another stalwart of the club.

She was a director for the American Friends of the Aldeburgh Festival.

== Honours and memorials ==
=== Honours ===
- 1995 Yale Medal
- Honorary degrees from William Woods College, Butler University, Bethany College, Christian Theological Seminary
- 1979 Juliette Low Medal
- 1980 Yale School of Music Alumni Award
- 1988 American Guild of Organists President's Award
- 1989 Chamber of Commerce's Community Service Award
- 1991 Council on Foundations Distinguished Grantmaker Award

=== Memorials ===
- The Clementine Miller Tangeman Award established in 1998 is given to "individuals for service to their communities and Emma Willard School".
- The Inn at Irwin Gardens, in Columbus, Indiana, previously owned by Tangeman's grandfather, Joseph Ireland Irwin (1823–1910), includes the Clementine Tangeman Suite.
- The Clementine Tangeman Medal at Smith College
- Tangeman Woods in Bartholemew, Indiana was donated to Sycamore Land Trust by the Irwin-Sweeney-Miller Foundation in 2007 and named in Tangeman's honor.
- "Hail the Day that Sees Him Rise", a hymn set by McNeil Robinson in 1994 to the tune "Llanfair" in celebration of Tangeman's life
