= 100 Years of Girl Guides =

2009 British TV programme

- Genre: Factual
- Directed by: Rosalind Bain
- Narrated by: Dominic West
- Country of origin: United Kingdom
- Original language: English
- No. of seasons: 1
- No. of episodes: 1

Production
- Producer: Neil Cameron
- Running time: 60 minutes

Original release
- Network: BBC Four
- Release: 16 August 2009

100 Years of Girl Guides is a BBC television documentary. It was shown on the digital television station BBC Four on Sunday 16 August 2009 at 21:00. The programme was presented by Dominic West and followed the story of the Girl Guides from its beginnings up to the centenary in September 2009.

The show interviews a number of former Girl Guides from veterans to such household names as Dame Tanni Grey-Thompson, Kelly Holmes, Clare Short, Kate Silverton and Rhona Cameron. It was directed by Rosalind Bain.
