= Selena Sloan Butler =

American activist

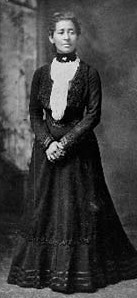
Selena Sloan Butler

Selena Sloan Butler (1872–1964) was the founder and first president of the National Congress of Colored Parents and Teachers Association (NCCPT). President Herbert Hoover appointed her to the White House Conference on Child Health and Protection in 1929. During World War II, she organized the Red Cross' first black women's chapter of "Gray Ladies." When Congress merged the NCCPT with the National PTA in 1970, Butler was posthumously recognized as one of the organization's founders. Today, Butler is considered a co-founder of the National Parent-Teacher Association.

== Early life ==
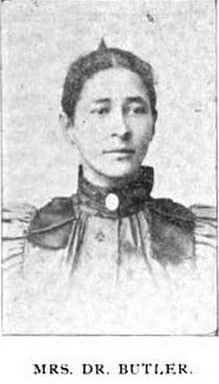
Selena Sloan Butler, from an 1899 publication.

Butler was born in Thomasville, Georgia to William Sloan and Winnie Williams on January 4, around 1872, just seven years after slavery was abolished. Her father was white, and her mother was of mixed descent, half Indian and half African-American. She started life with her mother and sister but without her father's presence, although she did receive his monetary support. She attended a missionary-operated elementary school in Thomas County and studied at Spelman Seminary (later Spelman College). At the age of sixteen Butler graduated from Spelman in 1888 (with a high school diploma) and began her teaching career in Atlanta. She later became a member of the Eta Sigma chapter of Sigma Gamma Rho sorority.

She married Henry Rutherford Butler, a prominent African American doctor in Atlanta who had studied medicine at Harvard University in Cambridge, Massachusetts. The couple had one son, Henry Jr. As their son, Henry, Jr., approached school age, Selena looked for a preschool. Finding none in her neighborhood or in any black neighborhood in the city, she decided to start a kindergarten in her home.

== Career ==
When Henry entered the Yonge Street Elementary School, Selena began seeking ways to help parents get involved in their children's education. Enlisting support from other parents, in 1911, Butler founded the National Congress of Colored Parents and Teachers Association (NCCPT) at Yonge Street Elementary School; the first parent-teacher association for African Americans in the United States. In 1919, she formed a statewide parent-teacher association in Georgia.

What began as a local venture grew into a nationally recognized organization. Butler's dedication to children and families stirred her to reach out to parents on a national level. She wrote several letters encouraging parents and teachers of color to form a union with the primary purpose of uniting home and school into a planned program for child welfare. Her letters stimulated interest in the parent-teacher movement and her own state Georgia became the first to organize. By 1926, Mrs. Butler aroused sufficient interest and issued the first call for a national convention. To this call, four states responded and sent delegates. During that same year, the once statewide parent-teacher association became the National Congress of Colored Parents and Teachers Association.

The NCCPT was modeled closely after its white only counterpart, the National Congress of Parents and Teachers (today, the National Parent-Teacher Association). Butler dedicated her life to forming an organization which would have the same objectives as the National Congress of Parents and Teachers. The NCCPT and the Congress of Mothers worked closely with each other to improve the conditions in schools for all children, regardless of race, as well as for teachers.

== Presidential appointment ==
Her efforts inspired President Herbert Hoover to appoint her to serve on his 1929 White House Conference on Child Health and Protection representing the National Congress of Colored Parents and Teachers and working on the Committee on The Infant and Pre-School Child, whose work contributed to the writing of the Children's Chapter. Between 1929 and 1930, she served on the president's Committee (presently, the White House Conference on Children and Youth) and would go on to lead the NCCPT for more than thirty years.

Butler was active in her community not only as an educator but also as an organizer. She co-founded the Spelman College Alumnae Association, organized the Phyllis Wheatley Branch of the Atlanta YWCA, and was the first president of the Georgia Federation of Colored Women's Club. Burler's entire life was dedicated to service. She was also a delegate to the founding convention of the National Association of Colored Women; a member of the Georgia Commission on Interracial Cooperation; a member of the Chatauqua Circle of Atlanta; a member of Sigma Gamma Rho sorority, Gamma chapter, and the Prince Hall Order of the Eastern Star.

=== Later years ===
Following the death of her husband in 1931, Butler relocated to England where she worked in the Nursery School Association. Thereafter, she returned to the United States to live with her son and his wife in Arizona where she organized the first black women's chapter of the Gray Ladies Corps. At the age of 92, Butler died of congestive heart failure on October 7, 1964, and was buried beside her husband in Oakland Cemetery in Atlanta. A portrait of Butler is displayed in the Georgia State Capitol building.

In 1966, the City of Atlanta dedicated the Selena Sloan Butler Park in her honor. In 1970, Butler was named a founder of the National Parent-Teacher Association. In 1995, Butler was posthumously inducted into the Georgia Women of Achievement Hall of Honorees.
