= Maria Elena Berini =

Roman Catholic missionary

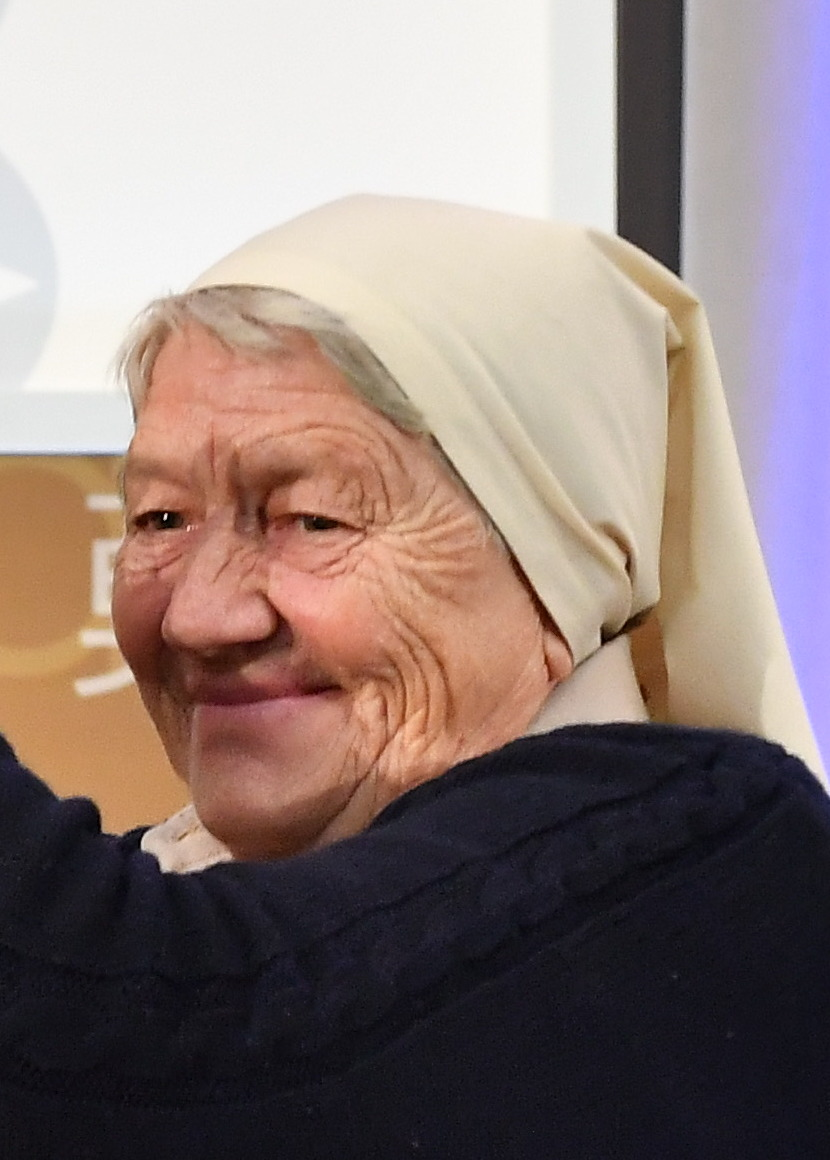
- Born: 9 December 1944 (age 81); Sondrio, Italy
- Occupations: Mission worker, teacher

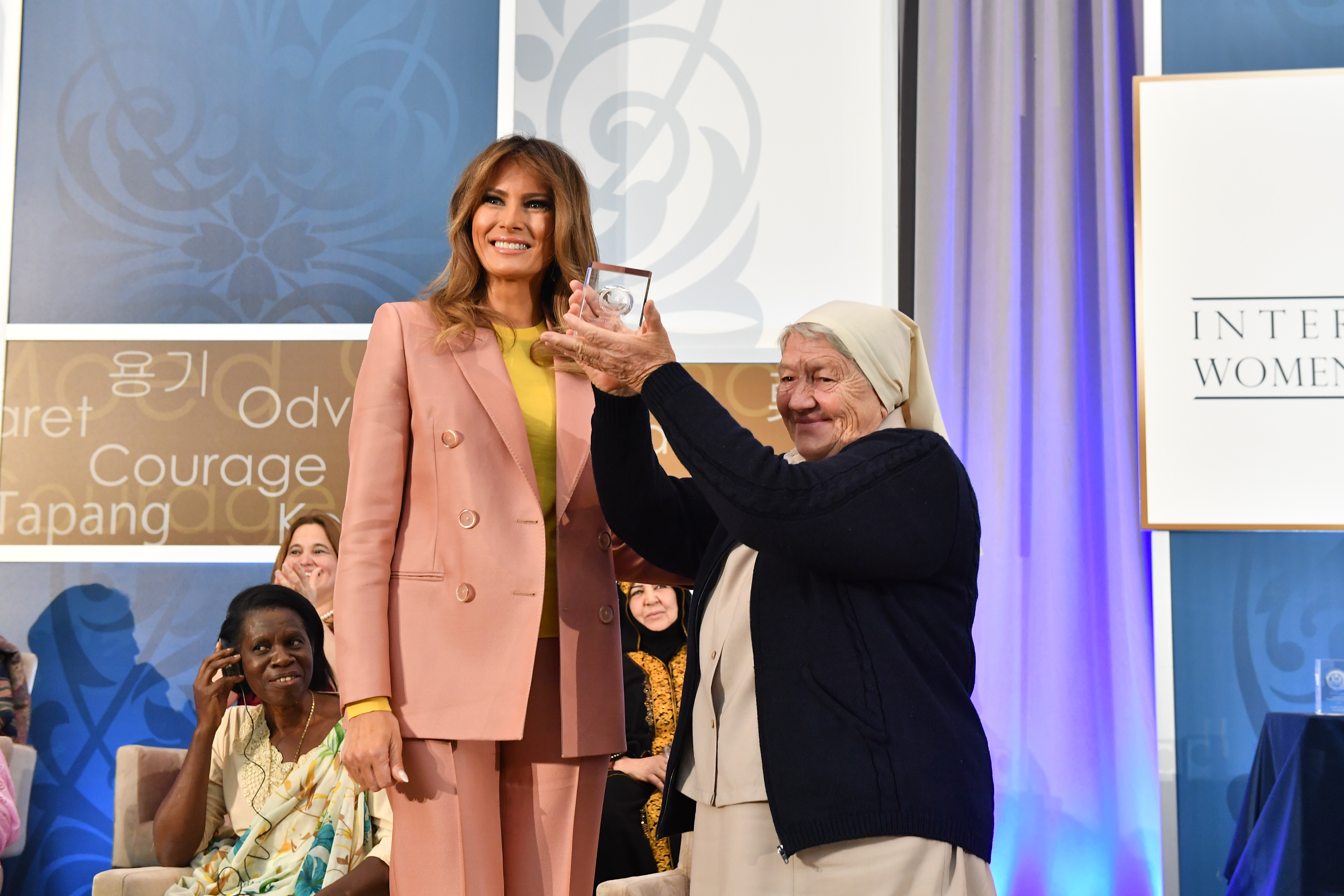
Berini receives International Women of Courage Award in 2018

Sister Maria Elena Berini (born 9 December 1944) is an Italian Catholic nun, and mission worker. She won an International Women of Courage Award in 2018.

== Life ==
She entered the novitiate of the Sisters of Jeanne-Antide Thouret.

From 1963 to 1969, she trained as a teacher. In 1972, she went to Chad, to work in rural schools. In 2007, her congregation sent her to the Central African Republic. In 2017, she provided refuge at her Catholic mission, when rebels attacked Bocaranga.
