= Nuestra Cabaña =

World Scout Centre in Cuernavaca, Mexico

Coordinates: 18°56′02″N 99°12′44″W

Our Cabaña
- Owner: World Association of Girl Guides and Girl Scouts
- Location: Cuernavaca, Morelos
- Country: Mexico
- Founded: July 1957; 69 years ago
- Website https://worldcentres.wagggs.org/nuestra-cabana/

Nuestra Cabaña (sometimes known as Our Cabaña) is an international Girl Guide centre of the World Association of Girl Guides and Girl Scouts (WAGGGS) located in Cuernavaca, Mexico. It opened in July 1957 as a Baden-Powell centennial memorial. The centre can house over 100 guests.

It is one of five World Centres of WAGGGS, the others being Our Chalet in Switzerland, Sangam in India, Pax Lodge in England and Kusafiri in Africa. Each centre is staffed by people from around the world, giving them an international feeling, but each also draws from the local culture. Nuestra Cabaña has been visited by over 70,000 Girl Guides and Girl Scouts from around the world since it opened.

== History ==
The concept of a Western Hemisphere Region world centre began in 1946 at a training session in Havana, Cuba, where participants discussed the idea of having a world centre in the Western Hemisphere as a counterpart to Our Chalet in Switzerland. The idea was later formalized and proposed to WAGGGS. Six years later, in 1952, the World Committee approved the idea of a new world centre in the Western Hemisphere region and a search for a location was conducted. A warm, sunny climate as well as accessibility by land, sea and air were considered a priority and locations such as Panama, Cuba, and Arizona, United States were considered before the current site in Mexico was chosen. WAGGGS formally announced the location in 1954 at a World Conference held in the Netherlands. Five acres of land were purchased for 25,000 dollars with the help of Girl Scouts of the USA through their Juliette Low World Friendship Fund. The remaining funds needed to construct the centre's buildings were raised by Clementine Tangeman, who solicited donations from corporations and benefactors as well as encouraging Girl Guides and Scouts worldwide to collect and donate the remaining money needed.

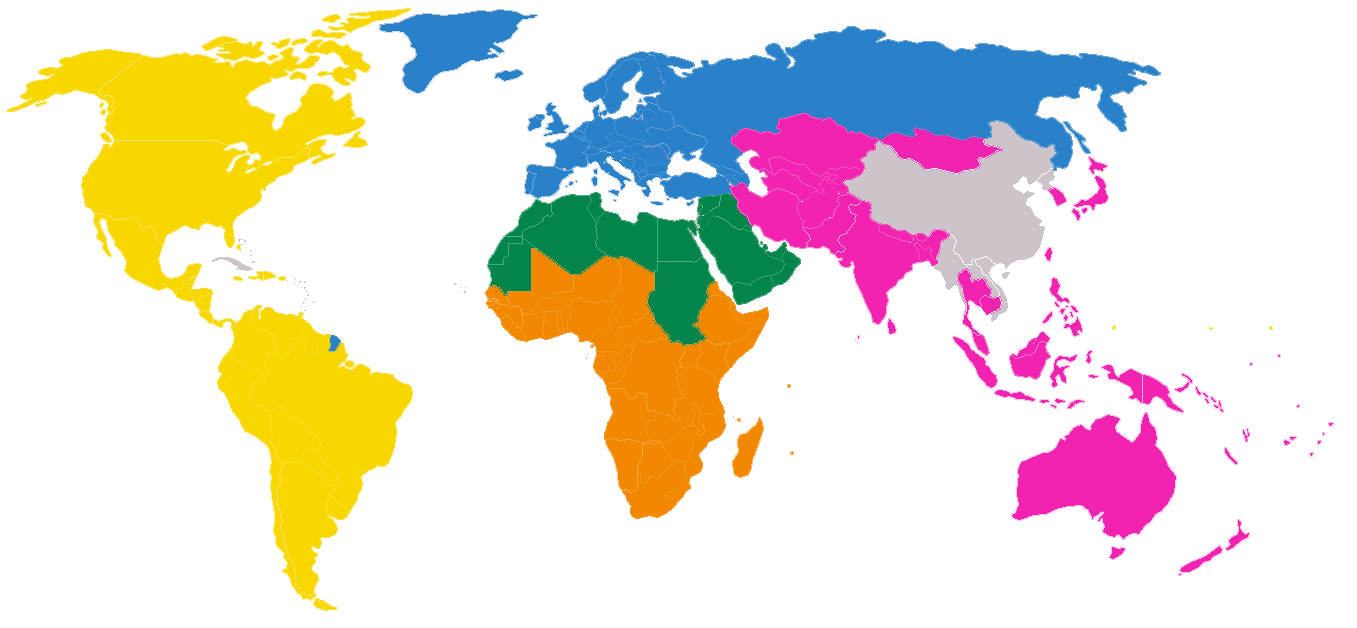
Map showing WAGGGS' five regions. Western Hemisphere is in yellow

Our Cabaña was dedicated on February 22, 1956 by Lady Olave Baden-Powell and officially opened on July 24, 1957. The first event held was a Juliette Low Seminar, at which participants wrote the Our Cabaña song to the tune of the traditional Mexican birthday song Las Mañanitas. The centre published its own songbook, Canciones De Nuestra Cabaña, in 1980, edited by Hettie Smith.

The property was expanded in 1969 to include the Geranios and Colorines dorms and the Mixcoacalli meeting and event space. A swimming pool, campfire circle, camping areas, volleyball and tennis courts and accessibility ramps were added in later.

The future of the centre was in doubt following its closure due to COVID-19. The other World Centres reopened in 2022. In January 2023, WAGGGS decided to take over the management of the centre (from Guias de Mexico) and to reopen later in the year.

== Symbols and mascots ==
Nuestra Cabaña's mascot is a lizard named Iggy. He was born in 2015. Previously, the mascot was a donkey, named Amigo.

The logo resembles that of the city of Cuernavaca, but has been given meaning specific to the Girl Guiding and Scouting movement. The central part of the logo is a three branch tree representing as a whole the worldwide movement of Guiding and Scouting, comprising more than 10 million members in WAGGGS member organizations. Each tree branch represents one part of the original three fold Guide promise. The red roots underneath the tree symbolize the solid foundation and continual life of WAGGGS and its members. The blue drop emerging from the side of the tree possess two meanings, communication between Our Cabaña and the local community and between Girl Guides and Scouts Worldwide as well as being an Aztec symbol of life used to demonstrate that life is flowing in the Girl Guiding and Scouting movement.

== Facilities and accommodations ==
The centre is made up of two main buildings, Xochicalli "House of Flowers" (Dining Hall) and Mixcoacalli "Meeting House" (Great Hall) set amid a 5-acre (20,000 m^{2}) tropical garden. The centre also has a swimming pool, tennis court, fire circle, and a craft house. It has eight large dorm rooms and several double guest rooms. Each dorm room is named after a flower found on the grounds, including Tulipanes (tulips) and Rosas (roses).

Nuestra Cabaña can accommodate over 100 participants, making it the largest of the five world centres.

The centre also organizes trips to elsewhere in Mexico for visiting Mexican Girl Guides.
