= Clément Bérini =

Canadian painter (1930-1996)

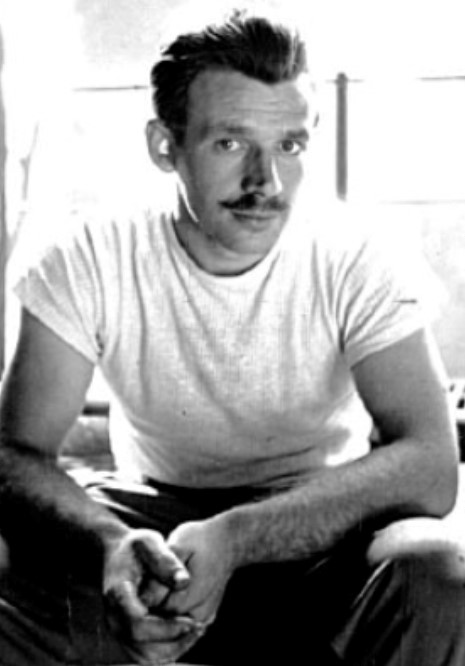
- Clément Bérini in Montréal, c. 1955
- Born: February 21, 1930; Timmins, Canada
- Died: July 21, 1996 (aged 66)
- Known for: Visual arts; painting
- Awards: Prix du Nouvel-Ontario 1986

Clément Joseph Bérini (February 21, 1930 – July 21, 1996), Franco-Ontarian born in Timmins, Canada, was a professional visual artist in Ontario, promoter of Northern Ontario art and Franco-Ontarian culture. He stands out among artists of the North because he was recognized early in his artistic career, when he was training in the classical-academic way of painting, and chose to pursue an artistic career in the North.

== Biography ==
Clément Bérini was born on February 21, 1930, and died July 21, 1996. He grew up in Timmins, a mining town and a centre of French-speaking culture in Northern Ontario. In the historical context of that era, under Regulation 17, French was prohibited in schools following third grade. Bérini had to live far away from home, in Ottawa and Montreal, to find higher education in French. Anita Spadafore, professor of art history, writes that

"Clément Bérini chose to pursue a career as an artist in the North, a region where the resources available to him were limited. With considerable effort, he succeeded in producing a work worthy of critical interest and he became a model for other aspiring artists in the North."

Professor Spadafore adds that Bérini's artistic production took place during a period of cultural and linguistic conflict for Franco-Ontarians. Despite this limitation, Bérini's work has been exhibited in galleries across Ontario, including the nascent circuit of Educational Galleries. His work is present in private collections in Ontario and Québec, and in public places, such as the Regional Hospital in Timmins, or the historical collection of the Ontario Northland Railway in North Bay.

== Career ==
Bérini's work is pictorial and painted in oil, but three-dimensional work is also part of his repertoire, along with religious and public murals, graphic work, and building renovation.

His initial mentor was Alphonse Lespérance, a Montréal painter who specialized in portraiture and still life, trained at the Academy of Fine Arts in Rome. Bérini started his artistic training with the techniques of academic painting, and from the 1960s his career engaged with modern art.

In 1950 Bérini travelled to Montréal to begin a formal apprenticeship with Alphonse Lespérance, a highly trained painter and artisan, who started a church restoration and decoration business. Bérini obtained the diploma of craftsman and worked as a foreman on church and building restorations until the early 1960s, when he established himself back in Northern Ontario. Upon his return he taught art and design privately and for Northern College, and produced art and stage works with the local arts organizations, including the Timmins opera and the theatre company directed by Vita and Cecil Linder. In 1963 Conrad Lavigne hired him as artistic director of CFCL-TV, the first Franco-Ontarian TV channel, launched in Timmins.

Bérini took part in Opération Resources, “a vast animation and training program launched in 1971, which will contribute to the training of a whole generation of professional artists present today in a variety of disciplines”, during a period of raising awareness in French-speaking Ontario. In the 1980s Bérini and other artists became very active in the field of educational galleries, to promote the arts and their acquisition in Francophone schools.

Bérini received the Prix du Nouvel-Ontario in 1986 for the quality and cultural impact of his artistic production, in particular his dedication to the Francophone and Northern artistic communities. In 1991 his activities as an artistic organizer led to the founding of BRAVO, the first support organization for Francophone visual artists in Ontario. The same year, Bérini was a member of the working group for a cultural policy for Francophones in Ontario, and contributed to the resulting ministerial report "RSVP! Keys to the future."

== List of exhibitions ==
=== Individual exhibitions ===
1980	Galerie éducative Thériault	Timmins
1981	Galerie Paquin, Centre culturel de Kapuskasing	Kapuskasing
	Galerie éducative Confédération	Welland
	Galerie éducative La Citadelle	Cornwall
1982	Musée de Timmins : Centre national d'exposition	Timmins
	La Galeruche, Centre culturel La Ronde	Timmins
	Galerie éducative l'Escale	Rockland
	Galerie éducative Algonquin	North Bay
1983	Galerie 815, Centre des Arts de Hearst	Hearst
1984	La Galeruche, Centre culturel La Ronde	Timmins
1987	Collège catholique Samuel-Genest	Ottawa
1989	Musée de Timmins : Centre national d'exposition	Timmins
1992	Galerie Emma Ciotti	Iroquois Falls

=== Group exhibitions ===
1981	Galerie éducative De La Salle	Ottawa
1982	Ontario North Now Exhibit, Ontario Place	Toronto
1983	Galerie Paquin, Centre culturel de Kapuskasing	Kapuskasing
1984	École secondaire Cité des jeunes	Kapuskasing
	Galerie Paquin, Centre culturel de Kapuskasing	Kapuskasing
1985	École secondaire Louis-Riel	Gloucester
