= Julie Bentley =

British activist

- Awards: Third Sector's 'Most Admired CEO' of 2014 Charity Times 'Individual Achievement Award' 2019

Julie Bentley is a British voluntary sector leader and Chief Executive of Samaritans. Julie was Chief Executive of Action for Children from August 2018 to February 2020. She had served in similar roles at Girlguiding, 2012–2018 the Family Planning Association and the Suzy Lamplugh Trust.

In February 2020 Bentley resigned as Chief Executive of Action for Children for personal reasons. She joined Samaritans as the charity's new CEO in November 2020, telling The Guardian newspaper that she sees the charity's mission to listen without judgement as "an extraordinarily powerful thing".

While Chief Executive of Girlguiding she oversaw a complete governance review, developed the organisation's first five year strategy, and changed their Promise so that members commit to ‘develop my beliefs’ rather than ‘love my God’. The organisation also launched a series of badges to support girls in the modern world including one promoting body confidence and another teaching girls about mental wellbeing. The charity also launched the Girls Matter campaign in order to get people in power to listen to girls’ views.

"Everything we do helps make girls and young women more aware, more confident and gives them a voice" she said of the charity, in an interview with the Financial Times.

During her term, the charity has enjoyed a revival with increased public understanding of their work to support girls and young women into adulthood.

== Background ==
Bentley was born and raised in Essex. She attended Maldon county primary, Essex; Plume comprehensive school, Maldon, Essex and subsequently continued her education at Central School of Counselling and Therapy, Hackney where she achieved a Diploma in Counselling and obtained a diploma in management with Goldsmiths, University of London and an Open University MBA.

After leaving school she took a job as a trainee photographic technician for Essex police. During that time she dealt with “horrific” scene-of-crime footage. She left three months and to help with the family finances after her father's sudden death she took a job as a “postman” (as the job was then described). She stayed with the Post Office for five yearsbefore moving on to train as a youth worker, having set her sights on working in the third sector.

She says she only applies for charity jobs where “I genuinely believe in what they do”. Bentley has won a number of awards, including ‘Britain’s most admired charity CEO (2014)’.

Bentley is a former chief executive of the Suzy Lamplugh Trust and the Family Planning Association. She was also Director of Corporate Services for ARP (Alcohol Recovery Project) and Assistant Director of Charterhouse – in Southwark. Her early jobs included being a postwoman and a youth worker in South London.

Julie was previously a Trustee and Vice Chair of the housing and homelessness charity Shelter and was formerly a trustee of young people’s helpline Get Connected (now The Mix). During her tenure at FPA she was part of the government independent advisory groups for teenage pregnancy and sexual health.

In 2009 Julie and her partner cycled from Land's End to John o' Groats to raise funds for the Family Planning Association and Seham Village Appeal a charity Julie is patron of.

In an interview with Empowering Women, Bentley explained, “I have deliberately committed my career to the charity sector as it’s where I believe real change can happen. It’s also a fantastic environment for developing potential.”

In 2014 she was named Third Sector's Most Admired Chief Executive at the Third Sector Awards and was included in the top ten of the Britain's most influential women in the BBC Woman's Hour Power List.

Also in 2014 Julie was a castaway on Desert Island Discs.

in 2019 she was named one of the most influential CEOs in the charity sector and in the same year was awarded 'Outstanding Individual Achievement' by Charity Times
