= Kusafiri =

African World Centre of the WAGGGS

- Owner: World Association of Girl Guides and Girl Scouts
- Location: Africa
- Founded: 29 January 2010
- Website https://www.wagggs.org/en/our-world/world-centres/kusafiri/

Kusafiri is one of the five World Centres of the World Association of Girl Guides and Girl Scouts (WAGGGS). It is based in Africa but has no fixed location, instead it moves around existing locations in different African countries. It has been located in Accra, Ghana since 2023.

In October 2015, the name Kusafiri was given to the fifth world centre. Kusafiri means 'to journey' in Swahili.

== History ==
Kusafiri World Center is the product of years of discussion to bring a World Centre experience to the Africa Region. In 2010, at the Africa Regional Conference, it was unanimously agreed that the Africa Committee would explore opportunities to deliver World Centre experiences in the Region.

In July 2011, during the 34th World Conference in Edinburgh, Scotland, a motion was passed to create an experimental two-year pilot project that could potentially lead to the creation of a 'Fifth' World Centre in the Africa Region.

The project was evaluated, with results and recommendations presented at the 35th World Conference in Hong Kong in 2014. The conference voted unanimously for the following:

The Fifth World Centre Pilot study has demonstrated the value of establishing a presence in Africa to host world centre international experiences in line with WAGGGS Vision 2020.

In July 2011 a pilot project was started to assess creation of a fifth world centre.

== Past Events ==
=== 2012 ===
==== Ghana ====
From 21 to 27 July 2012 an event was held in Ghana focused on Fund Development and Leadership Development. The event was attended by 19 participants from seven African Member Organizations as well as South Sudan, who is currently working towards full membership.

==== South Africa ====
The event in South Africa ran from 7 to 14 October 2012, and focused on Fund Development and Leadership Development. There were 18 participants from African countries as well as 3 more from elsewhere.

=== 2013 ===
==== Rwanda ====
From 6 to 11 May 2013 a 'Stop the Violence campaign' training event took place in Kigali, the capital of Rwanda.

==== Kenya ====
From 21 October to 17 November 2013, 8 participants from Senegal, USA, Kenya, UK, Rwanda, Lebanon and Nigeria participated in the Community Action Experience. This took place in the Shanzu Transitional Centre in Mombasa, Kenya.

=== 2014 ===
==== Nigeria ====
In April 2014 a Women's Leadership Development Program (WLDP) event was attended by girls from various countries in the Africa Region. The event focused on developing entrepreneurial leaders for the Region.

=== 2015 ===
==== South Africa ====
In May 2015, 26 participants from 14 countries took part in ‘Prepared to Learn, Prepared to Lead’ at Khiyalami, the national training centre of Girl Guides South Africa.

==== Benin ====
From 9 to 13 August 2015, 29 participants from 14 French speaking countries came together for another 'Prepared to Learn, Prepared to Lead' event.

=== 2016 ===
==== Ghana ====
From 30 May to 5 June 2016, 65 participant from 55 countries came together in Ghana for the Juliette Low Seminar. The event was themed 'Transforming our World' and focused on transformation of self, community and the World.

=== 2017 ===
==== Madagascar ====
From 11–17 April 2017, Kusafiri World Centre hosted Arts4Change, Kusafiri in Madagascar, in partnership with the Skotisma Zazavavy Malagasy. 69 participants from 13 countries representing 4 WAGGGS Regions participated in the event. The 8 member Planning Team represented 3 WAGGGS Regions from 5 countries

=== 2018 ===
==== Uganda ====
From 5 to 11 December 2018, Kusafiri moved to Uganda to host a new experience; two programmes at the same time. Kusafiri hosted a leadership programme to prepare facilitators for the 2019 Juliette Low Seminar and a cultural programme to explore the heritage and diversity of Uganda. 147 participants attended from 42 countries and for the first time 5 Kusafiri Volunteers were part of delivering this experience.
