= World Board (World Association of Girl Guides and Girl Scouts) =

Established in 1927, the World Board, originally World Committee, is a governing board for the World Association of Girl Guides and Girl Scouts (WAGGGS). Today, it is made up of seventeen active members of WAGGGS, all of whom are elected democratically by all member organizations at the World Conference. Of the seventeen, five are representatives of each of the five regions of WAGGGS - the Arab Region, the Western Hemisphere Region, the European Region, the Africa Region, and the Asia Pacific Region. These regional representatives are elected at the Regional Conferences.

The World Committee of nine was increased to twelve in 1963 and the period of service nine years. World Board members may serve for as many as two three-year terms. There is also a World Board Chairman, who is elected by the World Board members. The chairman is assisted in that capacity by the deputy chairman and WAGGGS's chief executive, all three of whom may sit on any committee of the World Board.

The purpose of the World Board is to oversee the execution of WAGGGS's goals and make sure the organization is fulfilling its mission statement: "To enable girls to girls and young women to develop their fullest potential as responsible citizens of the world." Each member of the World Board sits on a committee (or group). The regular committees include the Chairman's Coordinating Group, the Development of Girl Guides and Girl Scouts (which includes the five regional committees and the World Centers Committee), the Communications and Coordinating Committee, and the Finance and Management Committee.

== Chairman's Coordinating Group ==
This group is typically made up of the chairman, the deputy chairman, the WAGGGS Chief Executive, and representatives from several regions. They monitor the activities of all committees, task forces, and members of the World Board, and give help or report successes as they are needed.

== Development of Girl Guides and Girl Scouts ==
Although there is an overall coordinator for this committee, it is really made up of several smaller subcommittees, each committed to the five regions and the four World Centres. It works with the organizations in each member country to create and offer programs for the Girl Guides and Girl Scouts internationally. They also address the development of organizations, recruitment of girl members and adult volunteers, and retention of all members. Primarily, this committee gathers, uses, and shares information from each of the chairmen of the five regions and the directors of the four World Centres.

== Communications and Coordinating Committee ==
This committee includes a chairman and three to four members. Their responsibilities include coordinating the annual World Conference, following the messages about WAGGGS in marketing and media, directing the re-positioning of the organization, creating the triennial theme (2005-2008 is Adolescent Health), maintaining the relationship created between WAGGGS and the United Nations, and some fund-raising.

== Finance and Business Management ==
A chairman and one or two members oversee all the responsibilities of this committee. Not only do they monitor the finances of the World Association of Girl Guides and Girl Scouts, they also oversee WAGGGS's governance and constitution, as well as all the constitutions of WAGGGS's member organizations. The committee also addresses facilities and operations, risk assessment and management, and human resources.

== List of chairwomen ==
- Mrs Rose Kerr OBE (1928) - UK
- Miss Wyaendts Francken (1929)
- Mrs Helen Storrow (1930) – USA
  - Mrs Choate - for part of the time
- Mrs Helen Storrow (1931–1934) - USA
- Miss Marie Dillner (1935–1936) - Sweden
- Madame Marie Thérèse de Kerraoul (1937–1939) - France
- Emergency Group Functioned (1940–1941) -
- Mrs Gladys Bretherton (interim committee) (1942–1945) - UK
- Mrs Nadine Corbett (1946–1948) - Canada
- Mrs Ethel J Newton (1948–1950) - USA
- Miss Sylvi Visapää (1950–1952) - Finland
- Mrs Helen Means (1952–1957) - USA
- Countess Estelle Romaine Bernadotte (1957–1960) - Sweden, widow of Folke Bernadotte (Count of Wisborg)
- Mrs Dora Lykiardopoulo (1960–1966) - Greece
- Mrs Mary Nesbitt O.C (1966–1969) - Canada
- Mrs Marjorie M. Culmer (1969–1972) - USA
- The Honourable Beryl Cozens-Hardy OBE (1972–1975) - UK
- Lady Joyce Ethyl Price OBE, CMG (1975–1981) - Australia
- Dr. Helen M Laird OBE (1981–1984) - UK
- Miss Doris Stockmann (1984–1987) - Finland
- Mlle Odile Bonte (1987–1990) - France
- Mrs Barbara Hayes O.C. (1990–1993) - Canada
- Mrs Doris Riehm (1993–1996) - USA
- Mrs Heather Brandon (1996–1999) - South Africa
- Ginny Radford (1999–2002) - New Zealand
- Kirsty Gray (2002–2005) - United Kingdom
- Elspeth Henderson (2005–2008) - Ireland
- Margaret Treloar (2008–2011) - Canada
- Nadine El Achy (2011–2014) - Lebanon
- Nicola Grinstead (2014–2017) - UK
- Ana María Mideros (2017–2020) - Peru
- Heidi Jokinen (2020–2023) - Finland
- Candela Gonzalez (2003–2026) - Argentina
- Sarah Govan-Sisk (2026–) - Canada

== See also ==
- World Association of Girl Guides and Girl Scouts
