= Paul Revere Pottery =

American art pottery

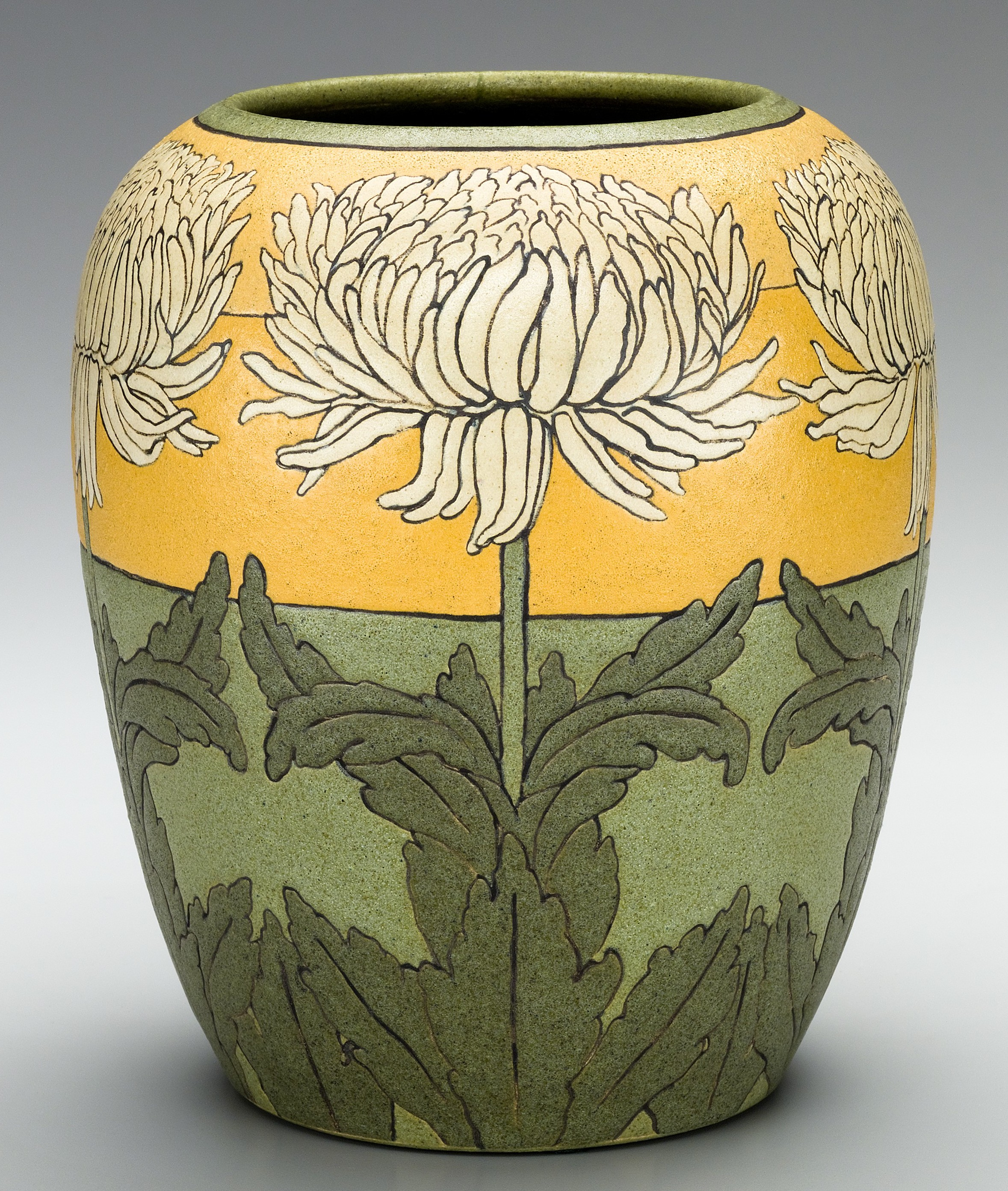
Vase, ca. 1911, Paul Revere Pottery. Metropolitan Museum of Art.

The Paul Revere Pottery was a woman-run American art pottery founded during the Progressive Era in Boston, Massachusetts in the United States. It emerged as a subgroup of the Saturday Evening Girls Club (S.E.G.). The library group was started and guided by Edith Guerrier, a librarian; her partner, Edith Brown, an artist; and Helen Osborne Storrow, the financial patron of the group. The Saturday Evening Girls Club was established in 1899, and located in Boston's North End. The group aimed to serve as an intellectual and social hub for young immigrant girls that otherwise had very few economic, educational, or social opportunities due to cultural differences. Paul Revere Pottery was established in the early twentieth century. The pottery gained national and international recognition.

== The Saturday Evening Girls ==
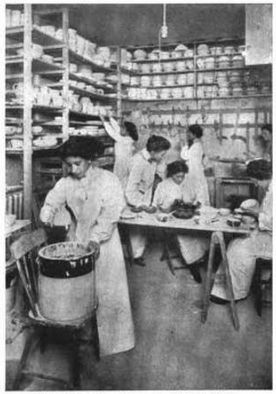
Saturday Evening Girls working in the Paul Revere Pottery, 1912.

Facilitated by Guerrier, the Saturday Evening Girls Club was a Progressive era reading group consisting of young Jewish and Italian working women. The group met at the North Bennet Street Industrial School (NBSIS), a community charity building that provided educational opportunities and training in vocational skills for both boys and girls. Much like other groups and charity organizations of the era, the clubs and facilities at NBSIS aimed to Americanize the young persons, bridging the cultural gap between immigrant families and Protestant American culture. The multiple reading groups that Guerrier led were organized and named after the day of the week the women met; the Saturday Evening Girls consisting mostly of older girls with responsibilities to their families or who additionally held down jobs. The women of S.E.G. had either immigrated themselves or were born to immigrant parents. Through activities and group discussions, the S.E.G. provided social and intellectual stimulation for the young women, exposing them to an array of experience across religious, language, and ethnic divides. Weekly meetings covered subjects ranging from music, literature, economics, job opportunities, and art. Often, prominent members of the Boston community would attend the S.E.G. meetings and give lectures or lead group discussions on a variety of historical and contemporary issues. Involvement in clubs like the S.E.G. provided the space to advance women's education in a manner that worked outside of traditional education methods, exposing the young woman to opportunities for socializing without fear of provocation for being female, for being of a specific religious group, or ethnicity. The women participating in S.E.G. stand out from turn of the century women at large, as S.E.G.’s members pursued higher education at a significantly higher rate than the native-born women surrounding them.

== The Pottery ==
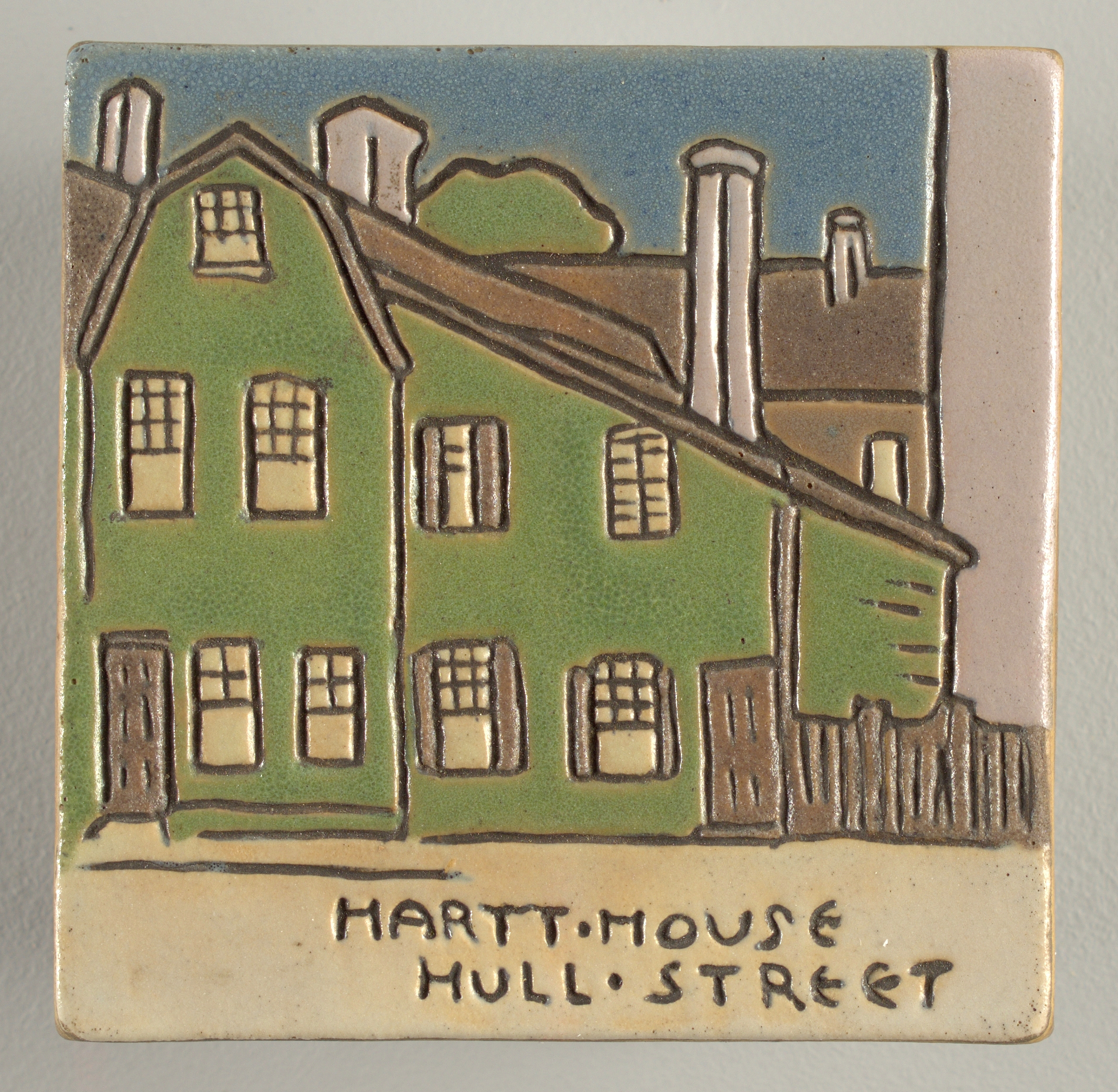
Glazed tile depicting the Edmund Hartt House on Hull Street, Boston, 1913.

While on vacation in Europe in 1906, Guerrier and Brown were inspired by the folk work of peasant artisans. The connection, economically and culturally, between the artisans and the women of S.E.G. seemed strong to Guerrier and Brown:

We spoke of making marmalade, or fruitcake, of hemming napkins and dishtowels, and finally we spoke of pottery, of the charming peasant ware of Italy, of Holland, of Germany, and now of Switzerland. Since our club girls were almost all of peasant stock, why not start an art pottery and produce American peasant ware?

Guerrier and Brown suspected that once trained, the pottery works sold by the S.E.G.s would provide an opportunity to gain additional income for many of the girls whose endeavors for higher education stood in direct contrast to the economic disparity and needs of their families.

Brown's art training contributed to solidifying the dream for a pottery. Starting in 1908, Brown taught pottery classes at NBSIS. Admittance of girls to the pottery classes was not supported by the institution, much to the frustration of Brown and Guerrier. NBSIS did not officially find the pursuit a worthwhile endeavor for young ladies. According to the institution, pottery classes did not increase the young women's potential for success as future mothers and assistants to their families. The commodification of their work turned the work from leisure-activity into a capitalist venture, which the institution deemed an unsuitable pursuit.

Storrow, a philanthropist and friend of Guerrier and Brown, decided to fund the pottery. In 1908, Storrow bought a four-story brick building in the North End, located on Hull Street. The Library Club House, or Hull House as it was often called, was very near to the Old North Church. The iconic church, where Paul Revere had hung his lantern, inspired the pottery's name: Paul Revere Pottery.

The S.E.G. had to seek much of their own funding to support the pottery and maintain themselves through the accomplishments they had cultivated as a group. S.E.G. secured funds through musical performance, reciting dialogues and plays, and poetry readings to wealthy members of the community and at different institutional galas and socials.

The prices of the wares produced by the pottery were only affordable to middle or upper class families; Storrow subsidized the wares. By 1914, Storrow's philanthropy had new aims with different organizations and concerns. She gave the S.E.G.s a year to become self-sustaining, provided them with a new building for their expanding pottery business, and then withdrew her financial support in 1915. Paul Revere Pottery continued to flourish for several decades, garnering national and international recognition through features in magazines, journals, and newsletters. At the height of its popularity in the 1910s, the pottery's wares were sold in most major cities throughout the United States.

18 Hull Street, the original site of the pottery, is a stop on the Boston Women's Heritage Trail.

== Design ==
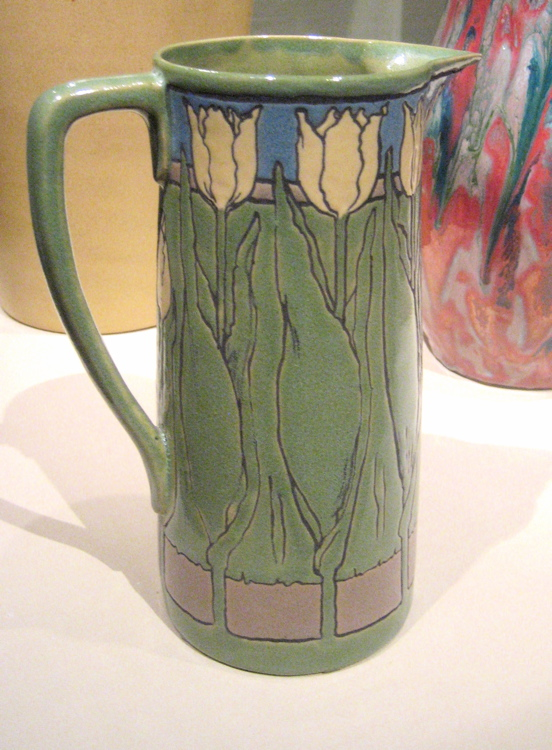
Earthenware pitcher made by Sara Galner, 1914.

The earthenware works came in numerous forms, operated at multiple levels of function and utility, and had complex, decorative glaze surfaces. Guerrier and Brown hired a local potter and pottery chemist who had worked in the Merrimac Pottery of Newburyport, Massachusetts, to help set the pottery in motion. The chemist provided the S.E.G. with a handful of recipes to begin working with. The studio primarily utilized yellow, blue, green, gray, white, and brown glazes at its onset. The range of glaze formulas and colorant usage expanded over time as technical skill was built and funding was more readily established. Soon, the pottery had a rich array of colors on their ware that played off and activated more fully the fanciful design elements.

Brown is credited for the principle designs for the pottery's works. Popular surface treatment of ceramic ware began to permeate the technical process and design. These designs harkened back to folk art while simultaneously expressing influence from Art Nouveau. The motifs ranged from simplified, country landscapes and houses of import to scenes from American history, such as Paul Revere making his famous ride. Floral designs including stylized lotus, tulips, and roses adorned many surfaces in equal measure with barnyard or symbolic wild animals, which pranced alongside winding script or grassy horizon lines. Bowls and plates with phrases or mottos involving allusions to virtues, or pieces bearing individualized names, were the most popular from the pottery, especially within the run of ware that was designed as a children's line.

Many of the forms that came out of the pottery were wheel thrown, but the forms which were more popular and produced in greater abundance were expressed from molds. Every pottery piece is signed with “S.E.G.” on the bottom, signifying the reading group, followed by the initials of the young woman artist who made or finished the form. On occasion, multiple initials were present on the forms.

In addition to making pottery vessels and objects, Paul Revere Pottery also made several ceramic tile friezes, usually depicting people interacting in wholesome environments with idyllic, romantic interactions occurring amongst characters and animals.

== Edith Brown ==
The pottery's artistic director, Edith Brown (September 10, 1872 - August 27, 1932), was born in Nova Scotia. In the early 1890s she moved to Boston, where she taught art classes at the North Bennet Street School. She met Edith Guerrier while taking an evening class at the Museum School (now the School of the Museum of Fine Arts at Tufts). and in 1908 became director of the pottery studio. Brown and Guerrier lived together in an apartment above the pottery in Brighton until Brown's death in 1932. Brown is remembered on the Boston Women's Heritage Trail. In 2014, her work was included with that of Alice Austin, Sara Galner, Edith Guerrier, Ethel Reed, and Mary H. Northend in an exhibit at the Boston University Art Gallery titled Craft & Modernity: Professional Women Artists in Boston (1890-1920).

== Sara Galner ==
One of the pottery's most celebrated artists was Sara Galner (1894–1982), a Jewish Austro-Hungarian immigrant who worked there for over ten years. Galner migrated to the United States with her family in 1901 and grew up on Salem Street in the North End. At the age of 14 she left school to go to work, but continued her education at the Central Evening High School and was active in the Saturday Evening Girls. In 1911 she went to work full-time at the pottery, where her starting salary was $7 a week. She quickly distinguished herself as a decorator with a special talent for floral designs. Galner's own designs are often associated to the Arts and Crafts decorative style. She also worked as a salesperson and eventually became the manager of the pottery's Washington, D.C. store. Galner stayed on at the pottery until 1921, when she married Morris Bloom. Over 130 ceramic works decorated by Galner are included in the permanent collection of the Museum of Fine Arts, Boston.

== Sources ==
- Chalmers, Meg; Young, Judy (2006). "The Saturday Evening Girls (SEG) Club and the Paul Revere Pottery". The Journal of Antiques and Collectibles. Archived from the original on October 16, 2007.
- Gadsden, Nonie (August 8, 2013). "Paul Revere Pottery and the Saturday Evening Girls". InCollect.
- Goldstein, Susan Kleckner (2009). "Reviewed Work: Art and Reform: Sara Galner, the Saturday Evening Girls, and the Paul Revere Pottery by Nonie Gadsden". Winterthur Portfolio. 43 (1). University of Chicago Press: 156–157. doi:10.1086/597344. S2CID 225088269.
- Guerrier, Edith (1992). Matson, Molly (ed.). An independent woman : the autobiography of Edith Guerrier. Amherst, MA: University of Massachusetts Press. ISBN 978-0-87023-756-0. OCLC 23731895.
- History Project (1999). "A tale of two Ediths". Improper Bostonians: Lesbian and Gay History from the Puritans to Playland. Beacon Press. ISBN 9780807079492.
- Larson, Kate Clifford (April 2001). "The Saturday Evening Girls: A Progressive Era Library Club and the Intellectual Life of Working Class and Immigrant Girls in Turn-of-the-Century Boston". The Library Quarterly. 71 (2). Chicago: University of Chicago Press: 195–230. doi:10.1086/603261. JSTOR 4309506. S2CID 141250519.
- Scheuerell, Ella Audrey (March 13, 2018). "A story in clay: Sara Galner and the Saturday Evening Girls". Smithsonian, American History.
- Wright, Livingston (September 1917). "Girls Club Establishes Pottery and Ultimately Makes It a Financial Success". The Art World. 2 (6): 578–579. doi:10.2307/25588119. JSTOR 25588119.
- "North End". Boston Women's Heritage Trail.
- Craft & Modernity: Professional Women Artists in Boston (1890-1920). Boston University Art Gallery. 2014. ISBN 9781881450375.
- "S. E. G. News". Internet Archive. 1952.
