= Saturday Evening Girls =

Reading and social club for immigrant women

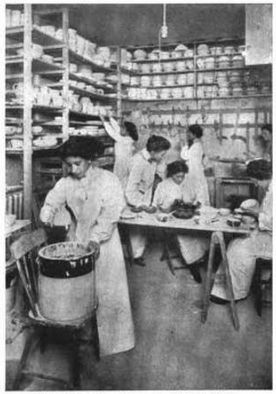
- Saturday Evening Girls working in the Paul Revere Pottery in Boston. House Beautiful, June 1912.
- Formation: 1899; 127 years ago
- Founder: Edith Guerrier
- Founded at: North Bennet Street Industrial School
- Dissolved: 1969; 57 years ago
- Type: Reading group
- Location: Boston
- Region served: North End
- Leader: Edith Guerrier
- Main organ: S. E. G. News

The Saturday Evening Girls club (1899–1969) was a Progressive Era reading group for young immigrant women in Boston's North End. The club hosted educational discussions and lectures as well as social events, published a newspaper called the S. E. G. News, and operated the acclaimed Paul Revere Pottery. Financed by philanthropist Helen Storrow and run by librarian Edith Guerrier and her partner, artist Edith Brown, the club originated at the North Bennet Street Industrial School (NBSIS), a community charity building that provided educational opportunities and vocational training. Meetings were later held at the Library Club House at 18 Hull Street. Storrow also provided a house in Gloucester, Massachusetts, where club members could vacation in the summer.

== Mission ==
The purpose of the club was to provide intellectual and social stimulation for the young working-class women of the North End, most of whom were from Italian Catholic or Eastern European Jewish immigrant families. At the time, the North End was an overcrowded tenement neighborhood with the highest child mortality rate in the city. Like many other clubs and charity organizations of the era, those at NBSIS were designed to Americanize young people by exposing them to middle-class White Anglo-Saxon Protestant culture. Additionally, Guerrier was instructed to "draw these girls in, from the perils of the street"; that is, to keep them away from saloons, dance halls, and other amusements which were seen as unsavory and leading to prostitution. In reality, most Jewish and Italian immigrant girls in those days were closely watched over by their families and forbidden to leave the house at night without a chaperone.

== History ==
=== Founding ===
In 1899, a young art student named Edith Guerrier applied for a position in the day nursery at the North Bennet Street Industrial School. She approached the school's founder, Helen Storrow, with a letter of introduction from her uncle, William Garrison, Jr., who was an old friend of Guerrier's father. Soon afterwards, Guerrier was tasked with maintaining the school's reading room, officially known as "Station W" of the Boston Public Library. Her story-hour quickly gained immense popularity with young women at the school, forming the foundation of what in 1901 became the Saturday Evening Girls' Club (S.E.G.).

=== Activities ===
The multiple reading groups that Guerrier led were organized and named after the day of the week the women met; the Saturday Evening Girls consisted mostly of young women with jobs or family obligations that kept them busy the rest of the week. Through activities and group discussions, the S.E.G. exposed the women to an array of experiences across religious, language, and ethnic divides. Weekly meetings covered subjects such as music, literature, art, economics, and job opportunities. Often, prominent members of the Boston community would attend the S.E.G. meetings and give lectures or lead group discussions on historical or contemporary issues. Speakers included a variety of professionals, academics, religious leaders, activists, artists, and writers. The club also organized parties, plays, folk-dancing recitals, and concerts by local performers. Around 1906, Storrow bought a 14-bedroom house on Wingaersheek Beach in West Gloucester, Massachusetts, as a summer camp for club members. Storrow paid for a director and an assistant, and the members paid most of their own expenses.

In addition to the funding from Helen Storrow, the club depended on volunteer work and donations. To raise funds, club members ran a restaurant and put on plays and other performances. In 1910 they staged a production of The Merchant of Venice at the home of Isabella Stewart Gardner. S. E. G. Club members contributed financially to the clubs for the younger women and girls, as well as mentoring them. Each member was also expected to contribute an hour of service each week to the clubhouse. In 1914, busy with other projects, Storrow withdrew her support for the library clubs, and the Saturday Evening Girls took over the responsibility. The clubs were moved to a space in the new North End branch of the library.

Involvement in the S.E.G. provided the space to advance women's education in a manner that worked outside of traditional education methods, exposing the young women to opportunities for socializing without fear of provocation for being female, or for belonging to a specific religious group or ethnicity. The women participating in S.E.G. stand out from turn-of-the-century women at large, as S.E.G.'s members pursued higher education at a significantly higher rate than the native-born women surrounding them.

=== Notable speakers ===
- Cyrus E. Dallin
- Paul Revere Frothingham
- Edward Everett Hale
- Heloise Hersey
- Charles Eliot Norton
- Vida Dutton Scudder
- James J. Storrow
- Edmund von Mach

=== The S. E. G. News ===
The club published a newspaper, the S. E. G. News, from 1912 to 1917. The editor in chief was Fanny Goldstein (May 15, 1895 – December 26, 1961), a Russian immigrant who had left school to go to work at 13. Goldstein continued her education part-time, taking evening classes at Simmons College (now Simmons University), Boston University, and Harvard University. She went on to head the West End branch of the Boston Public Library, where she worked with noted journalist and librarian George Washington Forbes. Goldstein conceived the idea for Jewish Book Week in Boston in the 1920s; her idea was later adopted by Jewish communities across the country.

The S. E. G. News printed club announcements, editorials (such as "Dire Dress" by Fanny Goldstein), informational articles (such as "Telegraphy as a Vocation for Women" by Sarah Wolk), personal reminiscences (such as "Fifteen Years Later" by Frank Rizzo), poetry by Charlotte Perkins Stetson and Evelyn Underhill, children's plays by Edith Guerrier, book reviews, lists of recommended magazine articles, and advertisements for local businesses such as Hood's Milk. Contemporary issues such as Zionism and preparedness for war were also addressed. Newsletters such as the S. E. G. News made a small but significant contribution to the education of their readers.

=== The Paul Revere Pottery ===
In 1908, Edith Guerrier and Edith Brown, with financial help from Helen Storrow, started a small pottery in the cellar of their home in Chestnut Hill, Massachusetts. Soon afterwards it was moved to the basement of the Library Club House at 18 Hull Street. It was named the Paul Revere Pottery because of its proximity to the Old North Church, where friends of Paul Revere had famously hung two lanterns to signal to him that the British were coming. In 1915 it moved to the Aberdeen section of Boston's Brighton neighborhood. In 1916, it was incorporated as the Paul Revere Pottery Company.

The pottery was more than an arts and crafts project designed to keep young women off the streets; it provided them with decent jobs. Working conditions at the pottery were better than the women could have expected elsewhere: they worked an eight-hour day and received a fair wage, daily hot lunches, and a yearly paid vacation. The pottery flourished for several decades, garnering national and international recognition through features in magazines, journals, and newsletters. It closed its doors in 1942. Paul Revere wares are now valuable collector's items.

=== Disbandment ===
Although the club's membership began to dwindle after World War I, the Saturday Evening Girls continued to meet on an irregular basis until the club was dissolved in 1969.

Papers and photographs pertaining to the club were collected by Barbara Maysles Kramer and are available in the Joseph P. Healey Library, University of Massachusetts Boston. 18 Hull Street, formerly the Library Club House, is a site on the Boston Women's Heritage Trail.

== See also ==
- North Bennet Street School
- History of Italian Americans in Boston
- Settlement movement
- Arts and Crafts movement

== Sources ==
- Bendor, M. (June 1927). "A People's Tribute". Opportunity: A Journal of Negro Life: 184, 186.
- Chalmers, Meg; Young, Judy (2006). "The Saturday Evening Girls (SEG) Club and the Paul Revere Pottery". The Journal of Antiques and Collectibles. Archived from the original on October 16, 2007.
- Guerrier, Edith (2009). Matson, Molly (ed.). An Independent Woman: The Autobiography of Edith Guerrier. University of Massachusetts Press. ISBN 9781558497610.
- Holden, Jessica (February 19, 2015). "Barbara Maysles Kramer: Saturday Evening Girls papers – Now open for research". Open Archive News.
- Klapper, Melissa R. (2007). Jewish Girls Coming of Age in America, 1860-1920. NYU Press. p. 114. ISBN 9780814748084.
- Larson, Kate Clifford (April 2001). "The Saturday Evening Girls: A Progressive Era Library Club and the Intellectual Life of Working Class and Immigrant Girls in Turn-of-the-Century Boston". The Library Quarterly. 71 (2). Chicago: University of Chicago Press: 195–230. doi:10.1086/603261. JSTOR 4309506. S2CID 141250519.
- Marchione, William P., Dr. (n.d.). "Boston's Paul Revere Pottery: An Inspiring Experiment in Social Philanthropy". Brighton Allston Historical Society. Archived from the original on January 1, 2018.
- Norden, Margaret Kanof (September 1962). "Fanny Goldstein (1888-1961)". American Jewish Historical Quarterly. 52 (1): 68–73. JSTOR 23874352.
- Wright, Livingston (September 1917). "Girls Club Establishes Pottery and Ultimately Makes It a Financial Success". The Art World. 2 (6): 578–579. doi:10.2307/25588119. JSTOR 25588119.
- "North End". Boston Women's Heritage Trail.
- "Fanny Goldstein". Jewish Women's Archive.
- "S. E. G. News, 1914-1917". Internet Archive.
- "North End District". The Boston Globe. March 9, 1910 – via Newspapers.com.
