= Helen Storrow =

American philanthropist and Girl Scout leader (1864–1944)

- Born: Helen Osborne; September 22, 1864; Auburn, New York, US
- Died: November 12, 1944 (aged 80); Doctor's Hospital, New York City, New York, US
- Known for: Girl Scouting
- Spouse: James Jackson Storrow (1864–1926)
- Children: James Jackson Storrow Jr. (1892–1977)
- Parent(s): David Munson Osborne (1822–1886) and Eliza Wright (1830–1911)

Helen Osborne Storrow (September 22, 1864 – November 12, 1944) was an American philanthropist, early Girl Scout leader, and chair of the World Committee of the World Association of Girl Guides and Girl Scouts (WAGGGS) for eight years. She founded the First National Girl Scout Leaders' Training in Long Pond, Massachusetts; headed the leaders' training camp at Foxlease, UK; and donated the first of the WAGGGS World centres, Our Chalet.

She was married to James J. Storrow, a banker, who was the second national president of the Boy Scouts of America.

Storrow provided a million dollars toward improvements of the Boston Embankment along the Charles River. The waterfront park was officially renamed the Storrow Memorial Embankment, but continues to be known as the Esplanade.

== Family and progressive roots ==
Born Helen Osborne on September 22, 1864, in Auburn, New York, she was the youngest of David Munson ("Munson") Osborne and Eliza Wright's four children. Her parents were raised in modest circumstances, but by the time of Storrow's birth, Munson Osborne had become one of the most prominent men in Cayuga County. Storrow and her siblings enjoyed a happy and privileged upbringing, attending private schools, traveling through Europe, and spending summers at their home on Owasco Lake at Willow Point, New York. The Osborne mansion at 99 South Street served as a cultural center in Auburn.

Storrow's eldest sister, Emily (1854–1944), married Springfield banker Frederick Harris; her next eldest sister, Florence (1856–1877), was described as a gentle girl, extremely fond of animals, who died of typhoid fever, leaving behind a fiancée, Samuel Bowles; her only brother, Thomas Mott Osborne (1859–1926), inherited his father's business, and became a stalwart advocate of prison reform.

Their father, Munson Osborne, was a farmer's son from Rye, New York. His ancestors were once prosperous landowners, but they became impoverished, having lost their fortune in the aftermath of the American Revolution. Osborne left his father's home at the age of fifteen, accepting work wherever it could be found. After several failed business ventures, Osborne founded D. M. Osborne & Co. in 1856, and made a fortune manufacturing agricultural machinery. Osborne's life revolved around his work. He was an exacting, but fair employer, and years after his death his former employees still spoke of him with admiration. One of Auburn's most respected citizens, Osborne served three terms as mayor (1877–1880); a position later held by both his son and one of his grandsons.

Munson Osborne was described as a loving husband and father, though he had a tendency to behave like a "benevolent autocrat." He respected his wife, and happily entertained her more liberal friends and relations. However, Osborne expected Eliza to conform, for the most part, to the traditional Victorian ideal of wife and mother. This meant virtually abandoning suffrage work after her marriage, and devoting the bulk of her time to domestic affairs.

Having been raised in a family of social reformers, Eliza (Wright) Osborne was stubborn, self-reliant, witty and outspoken, a far less conventional figure than her spouse. She was the eldest child of David and Martha (Coffin) Wright. Both parents were descended from Quakers who traveled to the new world with William Penn. The Wrights were not practicing Quakers, but they still adhered to many tenets of their parents' faith – a belief in simplicity, equality, and individual dignity. They were staunch abolitionists, whose home served as a stop on the Underground Railroad. The Wrights and their daughter, Eliza Osborne, were loyal friends of the Underground Railroad's famed “conductor," Harriet Tubman. They helped Tubman settle in Auburn in 1860, and provided Tubman with odd jobs, enabling her to support her family.

Storrow's maternal grandfather was, like her father, ambivalent at best about the issue of women's suffrage, but that didn't prevent Storrow's grandmother from actively campaigning on behalf of political equality. Martha Wright helped to organize the first suffrage convention at Seneca Falls in 1848, prepared the final draft of Elizabeth Cady Stanton's Declaration of Sentiments, and briefly served as president of the National Woman's Suffrage Association before her death in 1874. Martha's role in the suffrage movement has been largely overshadowed due to the fame of her older sister, the feminist, abolitionist, and Quaker minister, Lucretia (Coffin) Mott.

The Wrights lived at just a walking distance from the Osborne mansion, and played a significant role in the upbringing of the Osborne children, including Storrow. David Wright came to live with the Osbornes a few years after Martha's death, and spent the remainder of his life with Eliza's family, dying at a ripe old age in 1897. Martha Wright's friends and fellow reformers, individuals like Frederick Douglass, Elizabeth Cady Stanton, Susan B. Anthony, and Anna Howard Shaw, were regular guests in the Osborne home.

Storrow's aunt, Ellen (Wright) Garrison, was also involved in the fight for suffrage. She was an active member of the National American Woman Suffrage Association, campaigning with her sister-in-law, Fanny Garrison Villard. Ellen married William Lloyd Garrison Jr., a wool merchant, and the eldest son of "the Great Emancipator", abolitionist William Lloyd Garrison Sr. The younger Garrison was an abolitionist, pacifist, an opponent of Jim Crow laws and the Chinese Exclusion Act, an advocate of women's suffrage, Henry George's single tax, free trade, equality for Freedmen and immigrants, and a founding member of the American Anti-Imperialist League. His younger brother, Francis Jackson Garrison, served as the first president of the Boston chapter of the N.A.A.C.P. Storrow's cousin, Eleanor Garrison, graduated from Smith College, and worked for Carrie Chapman Catt as an organizer at the New York office of the National American Woman Suffrage Association. Continuing the family tradition of social reform, Eleanor later worked for several years as secretary of Armitage House Settlement in New York City.

== Death of Munson Osborne ==
In the mid-1880s, Munson Osborne sued Cyrus McCormick for patent infringement. The case proved to be difficult and protracted, with McCormick ultimately agreeing to settle out of court, paying Osborne $225,000, an enormous sum at the time. However, the stress of the case had a terrible effect on Osborne. On July 6, 1886, Osborne suffered a massive coronary. Storrow and her mother, having witnessed his collapse, tried fruitlessly to revive him, but he died later that evening.

Following her husband's death, Eliza resumed her suffrage work, going on to become vice president of the New York State Woman's Suffrage Association, and first vice president of the Cayuga County Political Equality Club. A tireless worker, at age eighty, Eliza led a delegation of women to Albany where they spoke before the State Legislature, lobbying for suffrage. Eliza was also involved in numerous philanthropic endeavors. In 1882, Eliza helped found the Women's Educational and Industrial Union, an institution that may have inspired Storrow's interest in settlement work. Modeled on an organization of the same name in Boston, the institution provided young working women with classes in practical subjects, such as sewing and cooking, later adding more intellectually gratifying classes in modern languages and literature.

Storrow was sent away to boarding school at the age of eleven. At the time of her father's death, she was spending most of each year at a boarding school in Springfield, Massachusetts run by a Miss Katherine Howard. In youth, her main interest was music, a love she shared with her brother Thomas. After boarding school, she spent time in Germany continuing her musical studies, later going on to graduate from Smith College.

== Marriage to James J. Storrow ==
Helen met her future husband, James Jackson Storrow Sr., in 1882, while touring Europe with her relatives. Though James was just one year behind her brother Thomas at Harvard, the Storrows met not in Massachusetts, but in Switzerland, while attempting to scale the Matterhorn. They were married, after a lengthy engagement, in 1891.

The shy and studious James, was described as "unassuming," but "magnetic", "a born leader and a keen judge of man; unassuming, yet in his quiet way exerting a strong influence over his fellows...a dominating personality." Temperamentally, he was the polar opposite of the out-going, effervescent Storrow. However, behind his stiff mien lay an idealistic nature and a keen sense of humor. Their marriage was described as "a perfect partnership” of equals, and Mr. Storrow's biographer claimed that “no two people ever saw more completely eye-to-eye on all the things that count."

James was descended from a long line of Boston Brahmin families, including the Jacksons, Higginsons, Tracys, and the Cabots who famously "talk only to God." His father, also named James Jackson Storrow, was a prominent attorney, whose clients included Alexander Graham Bell and the government of Venezuela; his mother, Ann Maria Perry, was the grandchild of naval hero Commodore Oliver Hazard Perry, and a distant cousin of President Thomas Jefferson.

James graduated in 1888 from Harvard Law School, and for twelve years was employed as a corporate lawyer. In 1900, he disbanded his law firm and accepted a position at Lee, Higginson & Co., an investment bank. James proved to be an astute businessman, quickly achieving the position of senior partner at Lee, Higginson & Co., and accumulating a vast personal fortune. Though he was employed by one of America's most conservative banks, James remained politically moderate and socially progressive, positions that set him at odds with other members of his social milieu.

The Storrows longed for a large family, but had only one child, James Jackson Storrow Jr., who was born on November 20, 1892, in Boston, Massachusetts.

When the hoped-for larger family did not materialize, they extended the mantles of "Aunt" and "Uncle" to include not only their own nieces and nephews, but also their son's companions and the children of friends. Helen wrote warmly of those precious years and the activities they sponsored for a stream of youthful guests at the country home she and Jim eventually built on a hillside in Lincoln.

From the earliest days of their marriage, the Storrows were interested in the settlement movement and charity work, helping to build playgrounds in poor immigrant neighborhoods, sponsoring night schools, vocational schools, and evening centers. James also took a keen interest in civil service reform, educational reform and legal reform, spearheading an effort to diversify the makeup of the Boston Chamber of Commerce, and helping to establish a juvenile court. In a testament to how highly regarded he was by Bostonians from every social strata, on multiple occasions James was asked to act as a mediator between corporate interests, the city, and labor unions. Elected on the Democratic ticket, James served for several years on the City Council, and during the First World War held the post of New England Fuel Administrator. He was largely responsible for preventing a severe coal shortage, actually using his own credit to ensure vital shipments of coal reached the Northeast, during the winter of 1917–1918.

The Storrows rejected "Nativist" ideology, i.e., the anti-Catholic, anti-Semitic, anti-immigrant stance widely embraced by the American upper classes during the late 19th and early 20th century. While serving on the Boston School Committee, James quickly "gained a reputation" among Irish-Catholics "for absolute fairness in the sensitive matter of hiring and promoting Boston teachers and administrators". He insisted that teachers should be hired and promoted on the basis of "merit regardless of religious background," whereas before, Catholics had been routinely discriminated against. When James ran for re-election to the School Committee in 1905, he received a ringing endorsement from The Pilot, Boston's leading Irish-Catholic newspaper:

Mr. Storrow is a Protestant, but he has a host of friends and admirers among the Catholics, clergy and laity alike, for his philanthropy which knows no test of religion nor of color; for his upright life; for his sincere devotion to the best interests of those citizens who most need the public schools. He will be found where he has been found heretofore, alert for the largest possible moral, material and intellectual benefits for the neediest, rather than seeking to control appointments for personal or political motives...

== Philanthropic endeavors and social reform ==
Storrow was involved in a wide variety of charitable activities during her life ranging from settlement work to land conservation. Storrow's initial focus was on children's charities, beginning with the playground movement. Distressed by the number of children being killed and injured in accidents while playing in the streets, Boston philanthropists began constructing playgrounds. It was also hoped that if the children had a proper place to play, rather than congregating in the streets, they would be less likely to become involved in gang-related criminal activities.

The North End of Boston during the late 19th century was an impoverished, over-crowded, filthy, disease ridden area, reminiscent of the London slums depicted by Dickens. The ward suffered from the highest infant mortality rates, child mortality rates, and homicide rates, in Boston. Many affluent Bostonians blamed conditions in the North End on the residents themselves, immigrants, who were predominantly Jewish and Italian. Massachusetts state legislator Edward C. Chandler voiced the opinion of many in Boston when he stated that "the personal habits of the tenants are largely responsible for such conditions…Undoubtedly many a suitable tenement house is turned into a place of misery by the ignorance and vice of its occupants."

Storrow agreed that further education was necessary, and should be encouraged in immigrant communities, but she rejected the notion that immigrants were inherently inferior, and disliked the condescension shown by many of her peers toward immigrants. She took a genuine interest in the women and children of the North End, joining the North Bennet Street Industrial School's board of managers in 1898, and serving as secretary of the institution. The school was founded in 1885 by Pauline Agassiz Shaw. The daughter of scientist and Harvard professor, Louis Agassiz, Shaw pioneered the kindergarten movement in the United States. The school provided classes in printing, pottery, stone carving, woodwork, woodcarving, woodturning, cement work, sewing and dressmaking; there was also an athletic club, a debating club, a drama club, music lessons, reading rooms, a kindergarten, and a nursery for infants belonging to working mothers.

=== Saturday evening girls ===
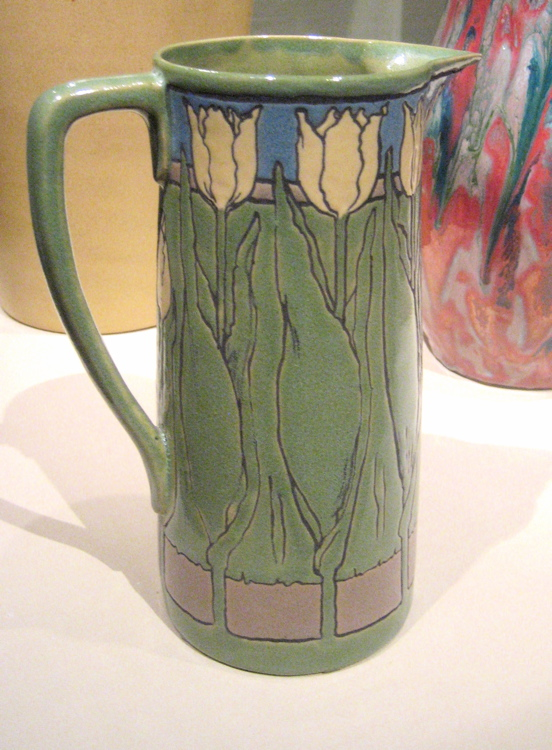
Pitcher made in the Paul Revere Pottery, 1914.

It was at North Bennet Street Industrial School that Storrow met Edith Guerrier. Guerrier, then a young art student, arrived at the school in 1899, looking for a position in the nursery. She approached Storrow with a letter of introduction from her uncle, William Garrison Jr., who was an old friend of Guerrier's father. Not long after coming to the school, Guerrier was tasked with the job of maintaining the school's reading room. Her story-hour quickly gained immense popularity with young women at the school, forming the foundation of what in 1901 became the Saturday Evening Girls' Club (S.E.G.). The club derived its name from the fact that its members were mainly young working-women, and high school students, who could only attend on Saturdays.

The weekly story-hour was soon expanded to include discussions about history, politics, civics, economics, art, literature, and lectures given by well-known figures. Guerrier managed to attract a wide range of individuals to speak before the club:

Edward Everett Hale, Reverend Paul Revere Frothingham, Charles Eliot Norton, activists Paul Davis and Meyer Bloomfield, social reformers Vida Scudder and Robert Woods, and many doctors, lawyers, judges, librarians, artists, rabbis, clergy, performance artists, suffragists, business leaders, and writers spoke to the S.E.G. on a variety of classical and contemporary issues.

Seven additional clubs were eventually formed, each named for the day of the week when members met. There was a club for girls as young as ten, another for working women in their mid-twenties, and clubs for girls every age in between. At a time when many first and second generation immigrants failed to graduate, or even attend high school, clubs like the Saturday Evening Girls played a vital role in educating their members. One young woman, Vanessa Casassa Bruno, described her experience as a member of the Saturday Evening Girls during the 1910s:

The S.E.G. talks that I have attended have helped me a great deal, in that I learned from them what other girls learned in high school, and I was thus given a general idea of the literature at different periods, civic and social problems in different countries, [the] fine arts...Through the club I became connected with the Branch Public Library. During my work there I was able to help children and foreigners to read proper books...to make them better citizens and scholars, as well as increasing my knowledge of books and authors.

Storrow was inspired by Guerrier's desire to impart her knowledge of art and literature to the young women of the North End, taking an avid interest in Guerrier's work, and using her connections to generate funding, and attract speakers to the club. A naturally exuberant, enthusiastic woman, during the club's early years Storrow became a familiar figure, forming lasting friendships with several of the girls, and providing the club with invaluable financial support. The Storrows would later personally finance the college education of several young men and women from the Saturday Girls Club, the North Bennet school, and various settlement houses they patronized. Believing that the young women would benefit from time spent in the countryside, Storrow also provided them with a summer camp at Wingaersheek Beach in West Gloucester, Massachusetts.

During a tour of Europe in 1906, funded by Storrow, Guerrier and her partner, Edith Brown, had an epiphany – they would return to America and develop a pottery. The enterprise would be operated by Brown, Guerrier, and the Saturday Girls, providing the young women with employment and a skill set. Storrow readily agreed to subsidize the venture and the Paul Revere Pottery was born. In 1908, she purchased a large townhouse at 18 Hull Street to serve as the club's new headquarters; the pottery and kiln were erected in the basement. The operation was wholly run by the Saturday Girls. They produced and decorated the pottery, operated the kiln, ran the store in Boston where their wares were sold and, later on, they also conducted pottery classes. Storrow, Guerrier, and Brown, agreed that an aesthetically pleasing atmosphere should surround the girls. Accordingly, their rooms were always filled with "fresh flowers and bright light," and as they worked, the young women were treated to "dramatic readings and soothing music" performed by the children of well-to-do families who patronized the pottery. They produced a wide variety of objects, including pitchers, vases, inkwells, plates, bowls, and even lamps.

The Saturday Girls regularly staged theatricals, operettas, recitals, and folk dancing exhibitions, to raise additional funds for the pottery. Storrow personally instructed the girls in the art of folk dancing. Their performances were attended by leading Boston philanthropists and patrons of the arts, among them Isabella Stewart Gardner. While their productions met with great success, the girls often resented the supercilious attitude of their wealthy benefactors. As previously stated, in the early 20th century many wealthy Americans, including some supporters of the Saturday Girls Club, viewed Italian, Irish and Jewish immigrants as inherently ignorant, either unable or unwilling to comprehend cultural and intellectual subjects, and unlikely to benefit from advanced education.

In order to raise funds and gain publicity, the club staged an annual exhibition, allowing affluent Bostonians to tour the pottery and view their work. The young women were angered by the “expectations of inferiority,” and the belittling remarks made openly by some visitors, who were astonished to discover that "illiterate" and "ignorant" girls could produce such beautiful artwork. The young women rebelled against their condescension:

In an interesting display of oppositional resistance…the girls acted out by feigning ignorance of English and exhibited a general lack of intelligence, all for the visitors' benefit. This performance by the girls, though funny to them, apparently infuriated Storrow...visitors ultimately walked away from their visit to the pottery with the image of the ignorant immigrant...

It was Storrow's fervent wish to dispel stereotypes of immigrants by demonstrating the artistic accomplishments of the women at the Paul Revere Pottery, and the organizations connected to the Saturday Girls Club. However, as one author noted: "For the girls, it [the opinion of the Brahmins] may not have mattered; Storrow's vision and dedication to securing a future for them, perhaps conflicted with their own ideas of identity, self-definition, and respect."

In spite of tensions between the young women and their benefactors, the pottery and clubs continued for several decades with considerable success. Storrow's growing involvement in scouting precluded her from continuing to take a personal interest in the daily operations of the Saturday Girls Club. She announced in 1914 that she would no longer be able to subsidize the pottery, but agreed to fund the operation for an additional year, while they developed a plan to become self-sustaining. In 1915, before withdrawing the bulk of her support, Storrow provided the club with a new building constructed on Nottingham Hill; an "L-shaped, two-story pottery, in the style of an English country house…with warm, well-lighted rooms," and additional space, where Guerrier and Brown made their residence.

=== Scouting ===
Storrow was introduced in 1915 to the founder of scouting in America, Juliette Gordon Low. It may have been this encounter that sparked her interest in the scouting movement. Whatever the reason, not long afterward, Storrow began holding Girl Scout training courses at her summer home in Lincoln, Massachusetts.

In 1917, Storrow founded the Pine Tree Camp, on her property at Long Pond, in Plymouth, which became the First National Girl Scout Leaders' Training School. Decades later, Scouts were still flocking to the camp for training.

In July 1932, Storrow provided the Girl Scouts with a retreat in Switzerland. She purchased a chalet just outside Adelboden, in the Bernese Oberland. Known simply as Our Chalet, the retreat remains in the hands of the Girl Scouts, and hosts "Helen Storrow Seminars", focusing on international education.

Storrow served for many years as First Vice President of Girl Scouts, Inc., the national organization of American Girl Scouts, and as chairman of the executive committee of Massachusetts Girl Scouts, Inc. Serving as Second Vice President of the national organization was none other that Lou Henry Hoover, wife of future president, Herbert Hoover.

After the initial founding of the American Girl Scouts organization, there were numerous squabbles with the older organization of British Girl Guides, including arguments over uniforms, territorial disputes, and an unsuccessful attempt by the Girl Guides to convince the Girl Scouts to change their name; the British organization considered the term "Scout" too masculine for a girls' movement. Storrow responded to the latter argument by suggesting that, instead, the Girl Guides should refer to themselves as Scouts:

Our name, Girl Scouts, is very dear to us, and seems to us the logical name. The terms scout and scouting apply to girls and their activities as appropriately as to boys, and represent the same laws and ideals. The idea that we are trying to make boys out of the girls is soon dissipated when the girls show their increased usefulness at home...

The suggestion to change the name met with the determined opposition from both our girls and their officers, and we shall in all probability remain scouts. I wish most heartily that we might share the same name. Would the Guides consider changing? I wish they would.

In spite of the initial tension between the British and American organizations, the Storrows became close personal friends of Lord Baden-Powell, who founded the Scouting movement, and his wife, Lady Baden-Powell. James Storrow's interest in the Boy Scouts mirrored his wife's interest in the girls' movement; he served as the second national president of the Boy Scouts of America.

In Storrow's honor, the Girl Scouts of Eastern Massachusetts Council presents individuals who have made "outstanding contributions to Girl Scouting" with the Helen Storrow Heritage Award.

Storrow is one of only three American women ever granted the Silver Fish Award by Lady Baden-Powell. It was awarded to her in recognition of her long service and dedication to scouting.

=== Folk dancing ===
Storrow's interest in dance began in the early 20th century, when several middle-aged Boston socialites organized a dance class to "amuse themselves and their friends." Storrow later said:

For several years we considered it only funny that we should be pirouetting and hopping about it in arabesque positions, and were ashamed to try to dance really well; but gradually we lost the feeling of self-consciousness and enjoyed it too much not to try to do our best.

During her travels in Europe, Storrow developed a passion for folk dancing, becoming a staunch devotee of Cecil Sharp, aiding him in his efforts to popularize folk dance in the United States. Storrow devoted increasingly lengthy amounts of time to providing lessons in English folk dance. In 1911, during a benefit for the Playground Association of America, Storrow could be found in the ballroom of the New Willard Hotel in New York City, leading a "practical demonstration" in folk dancing for those in attendance. A year later, she volunteered to instruct the Fathers' and Mothers' Folk Dancing Club at the Women's Educational and Industrial Union in Boston. In 1915, Storrow helped found, and served as director, of the American branch of the English Folk Dance Society, now known as the Country Dance Society, Boston Centre.

She believed that everyone's life, be they young or old, male or female, could be enriched by dance. She wrote:

As a means of exercise for girls and boys, and to break up snobbery and self-consciousness among them, folk dancing has been tried out and found to work wonders...it will do the same for grown-ups; it is doing the same where it is given a trial, but dynamite and a derrick are needed in most families...Our friends allow their daughters to make exhibitions of themselves in a way no North End mother would allow for a moment. At present anything goes. There seems to be total ignorance on the subject of what constitutes good dancing, and yet the principles can be clearly defined as those of any art. It seems to me they can be boiled down to three:

I. There should be pleasure in dancing...

II. Dancing should be for pleasure and not primarily for show. The moment it is self-conscious, there is something wrong. If in fancy dancing a position is taken because it is believed to be graceful, it isn't. There is no meaning in it. There is one thing wrong in ballet dancing; it is all meant to be looked at, and while stunts are humorous, it is better to leave them to acrobats, as they are not beautiful.

III. Dancing must develop the body naturally, strengthening the muscles in natural positions, not distorting them...

If we succeed in transplanting these beautiful old dances of other countries and they take root, they will grown and spread and blossom into other dances, showing the genius of our people, and reflecting our life and times.

Combining her love of dance with her passion for scouting, Storrow arranged for teachers from the Country Dance Society to organize a summer dance camp at Long Pond in 1932. Pinewoods Camp operated independently, alongside the Scouts' Pine Tree Camp. Lily Conant later operated the camp, which was willed to Conant's family after Storrow's death, becoming Pinewood Camp Inc., in 1975.

=== Storrowton Village ===
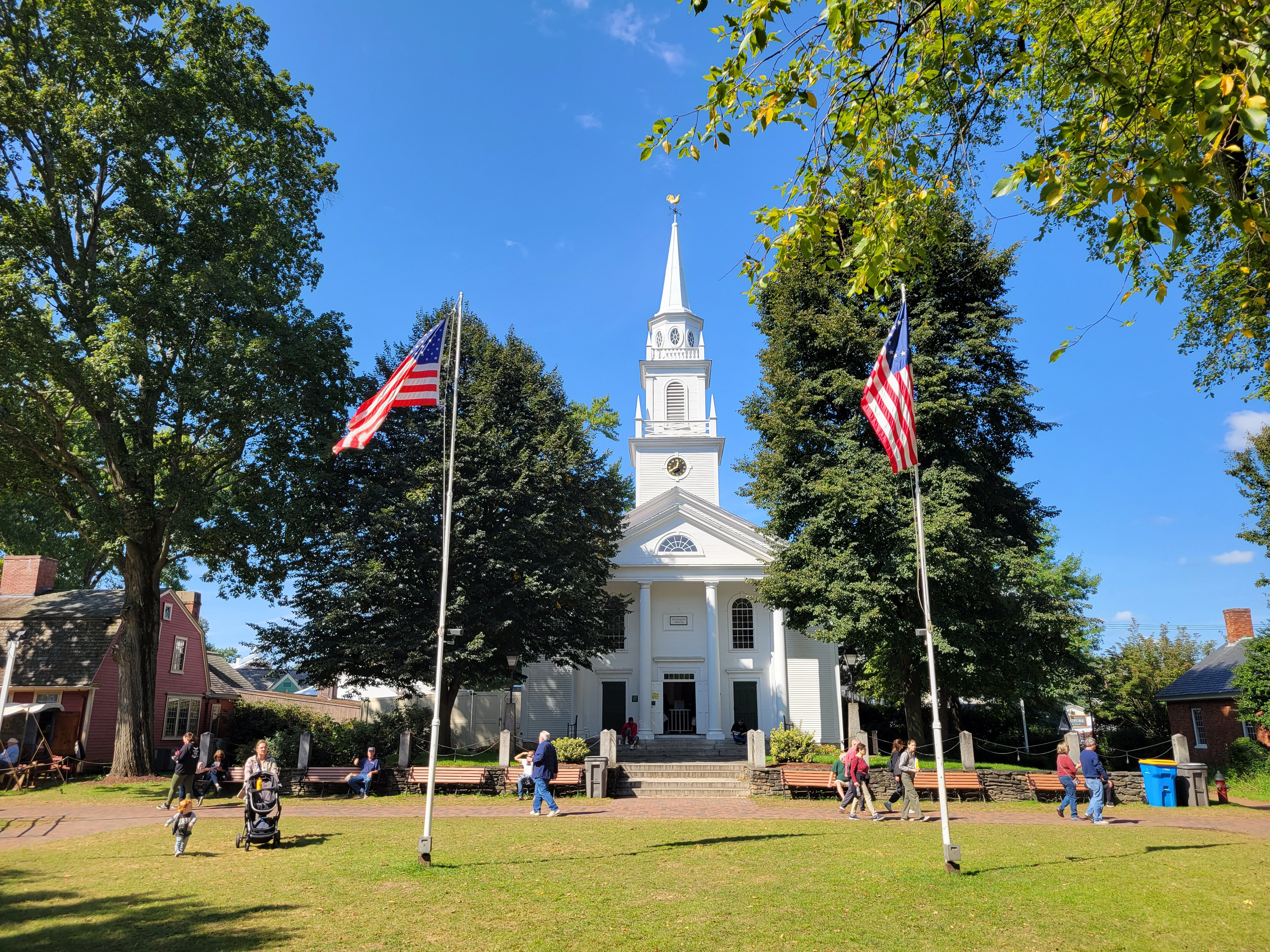
Storrowton Green at the Eastern States Exposition

Storrow oversaw the "home department" of the Eastern States Exposition, an annual fair occurring in New England. In 1927, Storrow purchased Gilbert House, a structure built in the 18th century, transporting the home from West Brookfield, to serve as a permanent headquarters for the department. From 1927 to 1930, Storrow invested nearly half-a-million dollars constructing the village of Storrowton, transporting authentic Revolutionary and pre-Revolutionary buildings and restoring them.

The village quickly became a popular tourist attraction.

Storrowtown, which is to Old Colony what Williamsburg is to the Old Dominion, was visited by more than 250,000 persons from all parts of the country last Summer [1940] and Fall...the buildings include, besides the church, a village hall, a country store, a tavern, a smithy, a lawyer's office and several mansions – all enhanced by the old-fashioned gardens, shrubs and picturesque carriage sheds. Antique furnishings grace the rooms, and rare hand-carved paneling, corner cupboards and hand-hewn beams are distinctive features...

Among the buildings reconstructed at Storrowton were: the Potter House (1776); the Atkinson Store (1799); the legal office of Zachariah Eddy (1810); and the Salisbury church (1834). The church contained one of the oldest hand-crafted pipe organs in existence. As a birthday present for Storrow, in 1935, Girl Scout volunteers planted a large herb garden near the Gilbert House, known as “Aunt Helen's Herb Garden,” filled with herbs commonly used in the Revolutionary period. The village was renamed Storrowton by the Trustees, in her honor, in 1944.

The village is currently run as a living history museum.

=== Further club and settlement work ===
In 1903, they helped found the West End House, a club for boys, mainly immigrants, providing classes and lectures on numerous subjects, including history, literature and physical education. Begun as a settlement house, it now serves as a Boys and Girls Club. In 1908, the Storrows provided the boys at West End House with a summer camp in East Parsonfield, Maine. West End House, like the Saturday Evening Girls Club, aimed to keep youths in poor immigrant neighborhoods off the streets, by providing them with educational and recreational opportunities. Their athletics contests gained both wide popularity and participation:

A central feature of the West End House was the development of a number of athletic teams and contests. West End House teams helped to increase neighborhood solidarity through the development of a string of intracity rivalries...The Thanksgiving day race was a community event in the West End. Huge crowds lined the streets to watch the boys run for neighborhood glory...

Another of her husband's endeavors was the Boston Newsboy's Club, which he played a prominent role in founding, in 1909. The club's stated mission: "To befriend in every possible way the newsboys and other boys of the city of Boston, without distinction as to race, color, or creed." As with the Storrows' other clubs, it provided Newsboys – youths who were then a common sight, selling newspapers on corners throughout the city – with an outlet for education and recreation, helping the boys graduate high school, and in some instances, go on to attend university.

Frustrated by the monotony of the activities sponsored by most women's clubs in Boston, in 1913, Storrow founded the Women's City Club, "to promote a broad acquaintance among women through their common interest in the welfare of the city…" She served as the club's first president. Her goal was to gather members from different socio-economic and cultural backgrounds, allowing for a diversity of views, to discuss relevant political and social issues.

The Storrows supported America's entry into the First World War, and Storrow presided over the War Service Committee organized by the Women's City Club, raising funds for the war effort. At the war's end, the Storrows converted their summer home into a sanatorium for wounded soldiers:

J. J. Storrow has given his country residence, Storrow Farm, Lincoln, with the adjacent buildings and sixteen acres of land, for a Lincoln convalescent hospital for enfeebled and crippled soldiers. The services of several employees, such furniture as can be utilized, care of the grounds, heating, lighting, and the like are included in the gift. A staff of women doctors and nurses have volunteered for service, and a war service committee of the Women's City Club, of which Mrs. Storrow was first president, is aiding to raise fund and equipment.

Towards the end of her life, as the result of her brother's activism, Storrow became interested in the cause of prison reform. To promote this cause, in 1930, she founded and served as president of the Women's Auxiliary of the Tom Brown House.

By the 1920s, the city hall in Auburn, New York, had become extremely dilapidated. Storrow and her sister Emily offered to donate a new city hall to Auburn in their father's memory. They hired prominent Boston architects Coolidge, Shepley, Bulfinch & Abbott; construction began in 1929. The dedication was held on April 5, 1930:

Thousands of people filled the street surrounding the hall. Flags and streamers floated in the breeze. The Star-Spangled Banner opened the event, played by the Boys Band, and America closed it. The program was broadcast on WSYR Syracuse, and amplifiers were placed above city streets. Boy Scouts and Girl Scouts served as escorts to the dignitaries, which included Storrow, Osborne's son and current mayor Charles Devens Osborne, Syracuse Mayor Rolland B. Martin and a number of state politicians.

During her final years, Storrow traveled frequently to Bermuda. As a gesture of her goodwill toward the island, she funded an annual scholarship allowing a student from Bermuda to study at Harvard.

In 1931, Storrow donated one million dollars to the State of Massachusetts to complete the development of the Charles River Basin, in which her husband had been involved prior to his death. It was largely due to the efforts of Helen and James Storrow that the Charles River Basin was landscaped and turned into a recreational area during the 1930s.

America suffered an acute housing shortage in the years following the First World War. In response the Better Homes in America Movement was initiated. It was a nationwide campaign to promote home ownership, beautification, and the modernization of housing. Storrow joined this movement, and detailed efforts to expand the movement to include African American families in an article she authored in 1931 for the Urban League.

One cause Storrow never actively championed was women's suffrage, most likely because her husband was opposed to it.

== Notes and references ==
- "Mrs. Storrow dies; Girl Scout leader". The New York Times. November 12, 1944. p. 50.
- Scouting Round the World, John S. Wilson, first edition, Blandford Press, 1959, p. 86
