= Fanny Goldstein (librarian) =

American librarian, bibliographer and editor

- Born: May 15, 1895; Kamenets-Podolsk, Russian Empire (now Kamianets-Podilskyi, Ukraine)
- Died: December 26, 1961 (aged 66); Boston, Massachusetts, U.S.
- Occupation: Librarian
- Known for: Founding Jewish Book Week

Fanny Goldstein (1895–1961) was an American librarian, bibliographer, and editor who founded Jewish Book Week. As head of the West End branch of the Boston Public Library (BPL), she was the first Jew to direct a public library branch in Massachusetts. During her tenure Goldstein made a point of recognizing the literature of the various ethnic communities of Boston, and curated a unique collection of Judaica. She also published literary articles and bibliographies and gave lectures on Jewish literature. After retiring in 1958 she became the literary editor of the Jewish Advocate.

== Early life and education ==
Goldstein was born on May 15, 1895, (Note: Some sources give her birth year as 1888.) in Kamenets-Podolsk, Russia, to Philip and Bella Spillberg Goldstein. She moved to the United States with her family in 1900, settling in the North End of Boston, where she attended the Hancock Grammar School. As a child she dreamed of becoming a doctor. Her father died when she was 13, however, and Fanny was forced to leave school to help support her mother and four siblings.

Around that time she joined the Saturday Evening Girls club, a reading group for young immigrant women in the North End. From 1912 to 1917 Goldstein served as editor-in-chief of the S. E. G. News, the club's newspaper. Through the club's founder, librarian Edith Guerrier, Goldstein became an assistant at the North End Branch of the BPL in 1913. While working at the library she took several classes at Simmons College, Boston University, and Harvard University.

== Career ==
Goldstein became librarian of the Tyler Street reading room in 1919. The branch served an extremely diverse immigrant population and provided reading material in several languages as well as citizenship coaching and recreational activities.

In 1922 she was appointed head of the West End branch of the BPL, the largest branch in the city. She was the first Jew to direct a branch library in Massachusetts. At the time, the West End was populated by many different immigrant groups as well as African Americans. Goldstein set up book displays and exhibitions relevant to various groups to encourage people to learn about their own and other cultures. In 1925 she started Jewish Book Week; the idea was adopted by Jewish communities across the country and led to the formation of the Jewish Book Council, which named her honorary president for life. As a believer in "the common heritage of man," she organized annual Christmas-Hanukkah parties at which both holidays were celebrated.

Over the years, Goldstein compiled the state's second-largest collection of Judaica (the largest belonging to Harvard University); in 1954 she was named curator of Judaica for the BPL. She published articles in journals such as the Jewish Criterion and lectured widely on Jewish literature, library administration, and inter-ethnic understanding, making a lecture tour of the Midwestern United States in 1936.

Her friends included "judges, priests, ministers, rabbis, Nobel Prize winners, scientists, business and professional leaders." Among the many young people Goldstein helped and encouraged were authors Charles Angoff and Reba Paeff Mirsky. Her correspondents included Mary Antin, Isaac Asimov, Alice Stone Blackwell, Felix Frankfurter, Molly Picon, Ellery Sedgwick, Friderike Zweig, and others. Civil rights activist George W. Forbes was her co-worker at the library in the 1920s.

Goldstein was a member of the American Library Association, the Massachusetts Library Association, the Boston Business and Professional Group, and the Boston Public Library Professional Association. In 1957 she received a citation of honor from the Jewish Book Council. Upon her retirement in 1958 the library trustees awarded her the title of Branch Librarian Emeritus. She later served as literary editor of the Jewish Advocate, an English-language newspaper for Boston's Jewish community.

== Death and legacy ==
After a year-long illness, Goldstein died at the Lemuel Shattuck Hospital in Forest Hills, Boston, on December 26, 1961. The Fanny Goldstein Merit Award of the Association of Jewish Libraries is named for her. She is remembered on the North End Walk of the Boston Women's Heritage Trail.
