= Mary Harrod Northend =

American writer

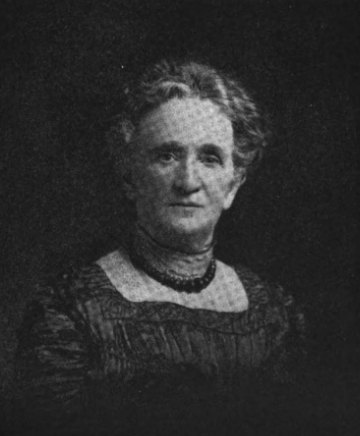
- Mary H. Northend circa 1915
- Born: May 10, 1850; Salem, Massachusetts, U.S.
- Died: December 17, 1926 (aged 76); Salem, Massachusetts, U.S.
- Occupations: Writer, Photographer

Mary Harrod Northend (1850-1926) was an American writer specializing in American colonial architecture and home furnishings. She is best known for the thousands of photographs she either took or commissioned to illustrate her books and articles.

== Early life ==
She was born in Salem, Massachusetts, on May 10, 1850, to William Dummer Northend and Susan Stedman Harrod Northend. Her father, a descendant of colonial governor William Dummer, was a criminal lawyer and a state senator, as well as the author of a history of Massachusetts titled The Bay Colony. Her younger brother was architect William Wheelwright Northend. She suffered from poor health most of her life and missed a great deal of school as a child due to illness. When she took up writing, she was in her fifties.

== Career ==
Northend began publishing "short historical sketches" in newspapers in the early 1900s, taking photographs with her Kodak camera to illustrate them. Dissatisfied with her own photographs, she eventually hired a professional photographer to come along with her on outings. According to the Anaconda Standard she had over 14,000 photographs to her credit by 1910; due to her "extreme nervousness," she could not physically take the pictures herself, but closely supervised their creation. She published countless photographs in books and periodicals under her own name, and ran a successful business selling images to editors, architects, decorators, and historians. By 1915 she had published in 37 periodicals, including the Boston Herald, the Ladies' Home Journal, and The Century Magazine, The Mentor, and published two books. At first she focused on colonial cookery, furniture, and decorating, later branching out into architecture and landscape. She traveled all over New England, writing about homes and gardens and supervising the photography, often spending hours arranging a single room before a photo shoot.

== Death and legacy ==
She died at Salem Hospital on December 17, 1926, from surgery made necessary by an auto accident.

Historic New England has collected over 6,000 glass plate negatives and several thousand prints of Northend's photographs. In 2014, her work was included with that of Alice Austin, Edith Guerrier, Ethel Reed, Sara Galner, and Edith Brown in an exhibit at the Boston University Art Gallery titled Craft & Modernity: Professional Women Artists in Boston (1890-1920).

== Works ==
- Colonial Homes and their Furnishings. Boston: Little, Brown, and Company. 1912.
- American Homes and their Furnishings in Colonial Times. London: T. F. Unwin. 1912.
- Historic Homes of New England. Boston: Little, Brown, and Company. 1914.
- Remodeled Farmhouses. Boston: Little, Brown, and Company. 1915.
- Eberlein, Harold Donaldson (1915). Architecture of Colonial America. Boston: Little, Brown, and Company.
- Garden Ornaments. New York: Duffield & Company. 1916.
- Historic Gardens of New England. New York: Mentor Association. 1916.
- Memories of Old Salem: Drawn from the Letters of a Great-Grandmother. Moffat, Yard and Company. 1917.
- Door Lore. Clinton, Iowa: Curtis Service Bureau. 1920.
- The Art of Home Decoration. New York: Dodd, Mead & Co. 1921.
- The Party Book. Boston: Little, Brown, and Company. 1921.
- The Small House: Its Possibilities. New York: Dodd, Mead & Co. 1923.
- We Visit Old Inns. Boston: Small, Maynard & Co. 1925.
- American Glass. New York: Dodd, Mead & Co. 1926.
- Historic Doorways of Old Salem. Boston: Houghton Mifflin Co. 1926.
