= Heather Brandon =

South African girl guides executive

Chairman Heather Brandon

Chairman of the World Board of the World Association of Girl Guides and Girl Scouts
- In office 1996–1999

Heather Brandon was the chairman of the World Board of the World Association of Girl Guides and Girl Scouts (WAGGGS), from 1996 - 1999. For her work, she received the OB-PS certificate and insignia at the WAGGGS conference in July, 2008. In addition to working as Chief Executive to a number of not for profits, she was also Director of The Global Fund for Children UK Trust, a grant making organisation that helps provide opportunities to vulnerable children. Brandon is a qualified executive coach and training expert in motivational team building and social diversity. She has been influential in youth education, international development and social entrepreneurship.

In 2009, Heather Brandon co-founded UnLtd South Africa with fellow trustee Kathy Watters based on the successful model from UnLtd in the UK to support social entrepreneurs in South Africa.

== Education ==
Brandon graduated from the University of Witwatersrand with a Bachelor of Arts degree and holds a postgraduate diploma in Executive Coaching from the University of Strathclyde.
