= World Association of Girl Guides and Girl Scouts =

International female-oriented youth organization

- Headquarters: World Bureau, Olave Centre, London, United Kingdom
- Country: 153 countries
- Founded: 1928
- Founder: Robert Baden-Powell
- Membership: 10 million
- Chair World Board: Sarah Govan-Sisk
- CEO: Anna Segall
- Website www.wagggs.org

The World Association of Girl Guides and Girl Scouts (WAGGGS /wæɡz/) is a global association that supports female-oriented and female-only Guiding and Scouting organizations in 153 countries. It was established in the year 1928 in Parád, Hungary. The organization now has its headquarters located in London, United Kingdom. It is the counterpart of the World Organization of the Scout Movement (WOSM). WAGGGS is organized into five regions and operates five international Guiding centers. It holds full member status in the European Youth Forum (YFJ), which operates within the Council of Europe and the European Union. With about 100,000 volunteers, WAGGGS serves 10 million Scouts and Guides and aims to help girls and young women become responsible global citizens.

== Mission ==
WAGGGS aims to help girls and young women become responsible global citizens. It provides non-formal education in life skills, leadership, and decision-making through international programs and community activities. Members participate in leadership roles through a democratic structure.

With about 100,000 volunteers, WAGGGS serves 10 million Scouts and Guides in 152 countries. It hosts events at five world centers, focusing on leadership, community service, and outdoor education. WAGGGS also represents its members at international events, including those organized by the UN, where it holds General Consultative Status.

Among its initiatives, WAGGGS partnered with Unilever's Dove Self-Esteem Project in 2013 to promote discussions on self-esteem and body confidence among girls.

== History ==
Girl Guides were formed in 1910 by Robert Baden-Powell with the assistance of his sister Agnes Baden-Powell. After his marriage in 1912, his wife, Olave Baden-Powell, took a leading role in the development of Girl Guiding and Girl Scouting.

As the movement spread, independent national Guiding associations were set up; however, a need for international cooperation was felt. Lady Baden-Powell founded an informal International Council in London in February 1918, which later became the International Conference in 1919. At the fourth World Conference held at Camp Edith Macy in 1926, representatives from several countries suggested the formation of a World Association to take the place of the informal International Council. After the 1926 International Conference, the Baden-Powells were approached about setting up a formal association, and in 1928, the World Association of Girl Guides and Girl Scouts was founded at the 5th International Conference held in Parád, Hungary. That year, the International Conference became the World Conference. Rose Kerr was Vice Chairman, later Commissioner for Tenderfoot Countries. From 1930 to 1939, WAGGGS occupied a room at the headquarters of the British Girl Guide Association, until it moved to 9 Palace Street, next door to Our Ark.

In 1920, two leaders from each known Guide country were invited to the British County Commissioners Conference held at Saint Hugh's College, Oxford. This became known as the First International Conference. The 13th World Conference was held in the same college in 1950. The member organizations continue to meet every three years (initially every two years) at World Conferences.

=== List of chairs of the World Committee / World Board ===
- 1928–1928: Rose Kerr
- 1929–1929: Esther Welmoet Wijnaendts Francken-Dyserinck
- 1930–1934: Helen Storrow
- 1935–1936: Maria Dillner
- 1936–1946: Marie Thérèse de Kerraoul
- 1946–1948: Nadine Corbett
- 1948–1950: Ethel J. Newton
- 1950–1952: Sylvi Visapää
- 1952–1957: Helen Means
- 1957–1960: Estelle Bernadotte
- 1960–1966: Dora Lykiardopoulo
- 1966–1969: Mary Nesbitt
- 1969–1972: Marjorie M. Culmer
- 1972–1975: Beryl Cozens-Hardy
- 1975–1981: Joyce Price
- 1981–1984: Helen M. Laird
- 1984–1987: Doris Stockmann
- 1987–1990: Odile Bonte
- 1990–1993: Barbara Hayes
- 1993–1996: Doris Riehm
- 1996–1999: Heather Brandon
- 1999–2002: Ginny Radford
- 2002–2005: Kirsty Gray
- 2005–2008: Elspeth Henderson
- 2008–2011: Margaret Treloar
- 2011–2014: Nadine El Achy
- 2014–2017: Nicola Grinstead
- 2017–2020: Ana María Mideros
- 2020–2023: Heidi Jokinen
- 2023–2026: Candela Gonzalez
- 2026–present: Sarah Govan-Sisk

=== List of directors / chief executives ===
- Dame Katharine Furse (first director, 1926–1936)
- Arethusa Leigh-White (1937–1946)
- Winnifred Kydd (1947–1948)
- Elizabeth Fry (acting director, 1948–1949)
- M.E. Home (1949–1950)
- Dame Leslie Whateley (1951–1964)
- Lesley Bulman-Lever (1997–2006)
- Mary McPhail (2007–2014)
- Anita Tiessen (2014–2017)
- David Coe (interim director, August 2017 – March 2018)
- Sarah Nancollas (March 2018 – August 2020)
- Anna Segall (September 2020 – current)
- Nadine El Achy (from April 2025)

== World Conference ==
The World Conference is the governing body and meets every three years. If a country has more than one association, the associations form a federation for coordination and world representation.

== Organization ==
WAGGGS consists of national Member Organizations, which are run independently but agree to abide by the WAGGGS constitution. The national Member Organizations are split into five regions. The member organizations, in turn, elect the World Board, originally the World Committee, which governs the World Association of Girl Guides and Girl Scouts. It is made up of 17 active volunteer members from around the world who are democratically elected by all Member Organizations and include the Chairs from each of the five WAGGGS regions. In addition, there is the permanent staff of the World Bureau based in London and headed by the WAGGGS Chief Executive (formerly Director of the World Bureau). Every three years, representatives from the member states meet in a World Conference to discuss and vote on policy. The World Committee changed its name to the World Board in 1996. The job title of the head of staff was changed from Director of the World Bureau to Chief Executive between 1964 and 1997.

Each WAGGGS Member Organization chooses how it believes it can best promote these goals, taking into account its culture and the needs of its young people. Some choose to work with girls alone in a single-sex environment in order to break down stereotypes and to give girls and young women the confidence to take their place in society. Other Member Organizations prefer to work with mixed groups to enable young women and young men to have equal partnerships within their units. Some Organizations choose to mix co-educational and single-sex approaches according to the age and the preferences of the young people.

=== World regions ===
The World Association of Girl Guides and Girl Scouts has offices in five regional divisions: WAGGGS-Europe Region WAGGGS-Arab Region WAGGGS-Africa Region WAGGGS-Asia Pacific Region WAGGGS-Western Hemisphere Region There is no WAGGGS Region corresponding to the World Organization of the Scout Movement Eurasian Region; post-Soviet nations are divided between the WAGGGS-Europe Region and the WAGGGS-Asia Pacific Region grey areas such as North Korea, Laos and Cuba have no Scouting

The World Association of Girl Guides and Girl Scouts has five regions: Europe, Arab, Africa, Asia and the Western Hemisphere.

=== World Centres ===
WAGGGS operates five World Centers that offer training programmes, activities, and lodging for girls and leaders, as well as members of some other groups and independent travelers. Activities focus on international cooperation, skill development, leadership training, and community service. The Friends of the Four World Centers organization supports and promotes the centers.

The five World Centers are:

- Our Chalet, in Adelboden, Switzerland; opened in 1932.
- Pax Lodge, in Hampstead, London, England; current location opened in 1990. It is actually London's third World Centre; the first was Our Ark, which opened in 1937, and renamed Olave House on its 25th anniversary.
- Our Cabaña, in Cuernavaca, Mexico; opened in 1957.
- Sangam, in Pune, Maharashtra, India; opened in 1966.
- Kusafiri, moving between cities, in Africa; opened in 2010.

A new centre, Kusafiri, meaning "to journey" in Swahili, was announced in 2015. Unlike the other centers, it will be a roving centre and exist for a fixed period of time in different places with a particular theme in Africa. While testing the idea, starting in 2012, the country organizations involved include Ghana, South Africa, Rwanda, Kenya, Nigeria, and Benin. Focuses so far have included "Stopping the Violence" training in Rwanda and developing entrepreneurial leaders among others.

== World Trefoil ==
WAGGGS membership badge

Miss Kari Aas designed the World Trefoil emblem that was adopted at the World Conference in 1930, a gold trefoil on a blue background.

The three leaves represent the three duties and the three parts of the promise, the two five-pointed stars stand for the promise and the law, and the vein in the center represents the compass needle showing the right way. The opening in the circle represents the organization being open to everyone. The base of the trefoil stands for the flame of the love of humanity, and the colors blue and gold represent the sun shining over all children in the world.

The World Badge, incorporating the trefoil, was first adopted at the 11th World Conference in Evian, France in 1946.

The World Association Badge, similar in design to the World Badge, was first adopted at the 7th World Conference in Bucze, near Górki Wielkie in Poland, in 1932. It is worn by members of the World Board, its Committees, World Bureau, and World Centre staff.

== See also ==
- List of World Association of Girl Guides and Girl Scouts members
- World Citizenship Award
