= UnLtd South Africa =

UnLtd South Africa - Supporting Social Entrepreneurs
- Founded: 2009
- Registration no.: 095-247-NPO
- Location: Head office; Cape Town, South Africa
- Region served: Western Cape, South Africa
- Method: grants, mentorship, training, networking
- Website: UnLtd South Africa

UnLtd South Africa is a nonprofit organisation that identifies and supports social entrepreneurs in South Africa. The organisation makes awards of financial and non-financial support to social entrepreneurs, appropriate to their stage of development.

== History ==
UnLtd South Africa was founded by Heather Brandon and Kathy Watters based on the successful model of UnLtd in the United Kingdom.
