= John Russell Savige =

Australian Scouting leader (1908–1977)

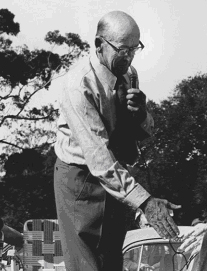
- Born: 25 July 1908; Moe, Victoria, Australia
- Died: 21 November 1977 (aged 69); Moe, Victoria, Australia
- Spouse: Shirley Golder
- Relatives: Lieutenant General Sir Stanley Savige
- Military career
- Allegiance: Australian Imperial Force
- Service years: 1939 – 1945
- Rank: Captain
- Nickname: Russ
- Units: World War II; Battle of Greece
- Awards: Military Cross; Mention in Despatches (2)
- Other work: leading figure, Scouts Australia

John Russell Savige MC, ED (25 July 1908 in Moe, Gippsland, Victoria, Australia – 21 November 1977 in Moe, Victoria) was a leading figure in Scouting in Victoria. From 1939 to 1945 he served in World War II and was taken Prisoner of War in Crete.

== Background ==
Savige's parents were Albert (Bert) Savige and his wife Alice Long. His grandfather John Savige arrived in Australia as a free settler in 1852 from Towcester, Northampton, England. In 1856 at Bendigo he married Emma Russell, a native of Wales. After fossicking for gold for several years, he proceeded to clear, farm and settle areas of Victoria such as Lake Condah in the Western District and Narracan and Moe in Gippsland. Savige was a first cousin of Lieutenant General Sir Stanley Savige.

== World War II ==
Savige enlisted in the 2nd AIF and served as a captain in the 2/7th Battalion in North Africa, where he was awarded the Military Cross at Bardia and was twice mentioned in despatches. From Libya the battalion was ordered to Greece and then to Crete where he was taken prisoner by the Germans.

== After the War ==
After his discharge from the army, Savige had to rebuild the family farm in Moe and became involved in many community organizations including the Anglican Church, Legacy, Rotary, Moe High School Council and the Moe Co-operative Dairying Co. (chairman of the board). From Germany he was nominated and accepted as a member of the Melbourne Cricket Club.

== Scouting ==
Savige joined Scouting in 1924. In 1933 he attended the 4th World Scout Jamboree in Hungary, where he met Lord Baden-Powell. After the war, Savige became assistant district commissioner of the Strzelecki District and later, district commissioner of the McDonald District. In 1972 the chief commissioner awarded him the Silver Acorn for exceptional services to Scouting. The Russ Savige Log Cabin, Camp Caringal, Erica was erected in memory of Savige, the plaque being unveiled by his widow, Shirley, on 22 March 1981.
