= North Bennet Street School =

Private vocational school located in Boston, Massachusetts, United States

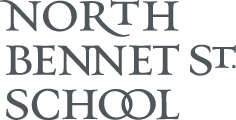
- Former name: North Bennet Street Industrial School
- Motto in English: An Education in Craftsmanship
- Established: 1881
- President: Sarah B. Cunningham
- Provost: Claire Fruitman
- Academic staff: 17 (2019)
- Students: 154 (2019)
- Location: Boston, Massachusetts, United States; 42°21′45″N 71°3′17″W
- Website: www.nbss.edu

North Bennet Street School (NBSS) is a private vocational school in Boston, Massachusetts. NBSS offers nine full-time programs, including bookbinding, cabinet and furniture making, carpentry, jewelry making and repair, locksmithing and security technology, basic piano technology, advanced piano technology, preservation carpentry, and violin making and repair, as well as a range of short courses and continuing education opportunities. Housed for more than 130 years at 39 North Bennet Street, near the Old North Church in Boston's North End, the School completed renovations on the former Police Station One and former City of Boston Printing Plant in September 2013. The subsequent move to the fully renovated 65,000 sq. ft. facility at 150 North Street brought all of their programs under one roof.

Founded in 1879 as the North End Industrial Home by volunteers from the Associated Charities as a settlement house serving the needs of recent immigrants, North Bennet Street Industrial School was officially incorporated in 1885. The vocational and preparatory programs underwent changes throughout the nineteenth and twentieth century and the school assumed its present name and mission in 1981.

== History ==
=== The Immigrant Experience ===
The North End Industrial Home was originally established at 39 North Bennet Street in 1879 by fifty volunteers from an organization known as the Associated Charities as a settlement house serving the needs of recent immigrants in Boston's North End. In the late nineteenth century, the North End was among the most densely populated areas in the United States. The low-rent tenements near the docks had been drawing immigrants for generations. Driven by a philanthropic philosophy of "elevation by contact", the Associated Charities volunteers sought to improve the circumstances of the poor through visitation and by way of example. The volunteers taught sewing and laundry classes to those they called the "worthy poor": widows, single women, and women supporting their husbands. Class participants received instruction and wages for piece work.

Pauline Agassiz Shaw joined the ranks of the volunteers in 1880. She founded a kindergarten and nursery school in the building and donated the money needed to lease the building for five years. The North End Industrial Home grew as a school for children and their mothers, as well as a training ground for prospective teachers. Recreation rooms, a lending library, and social clubs for working adults were also housed in the building.

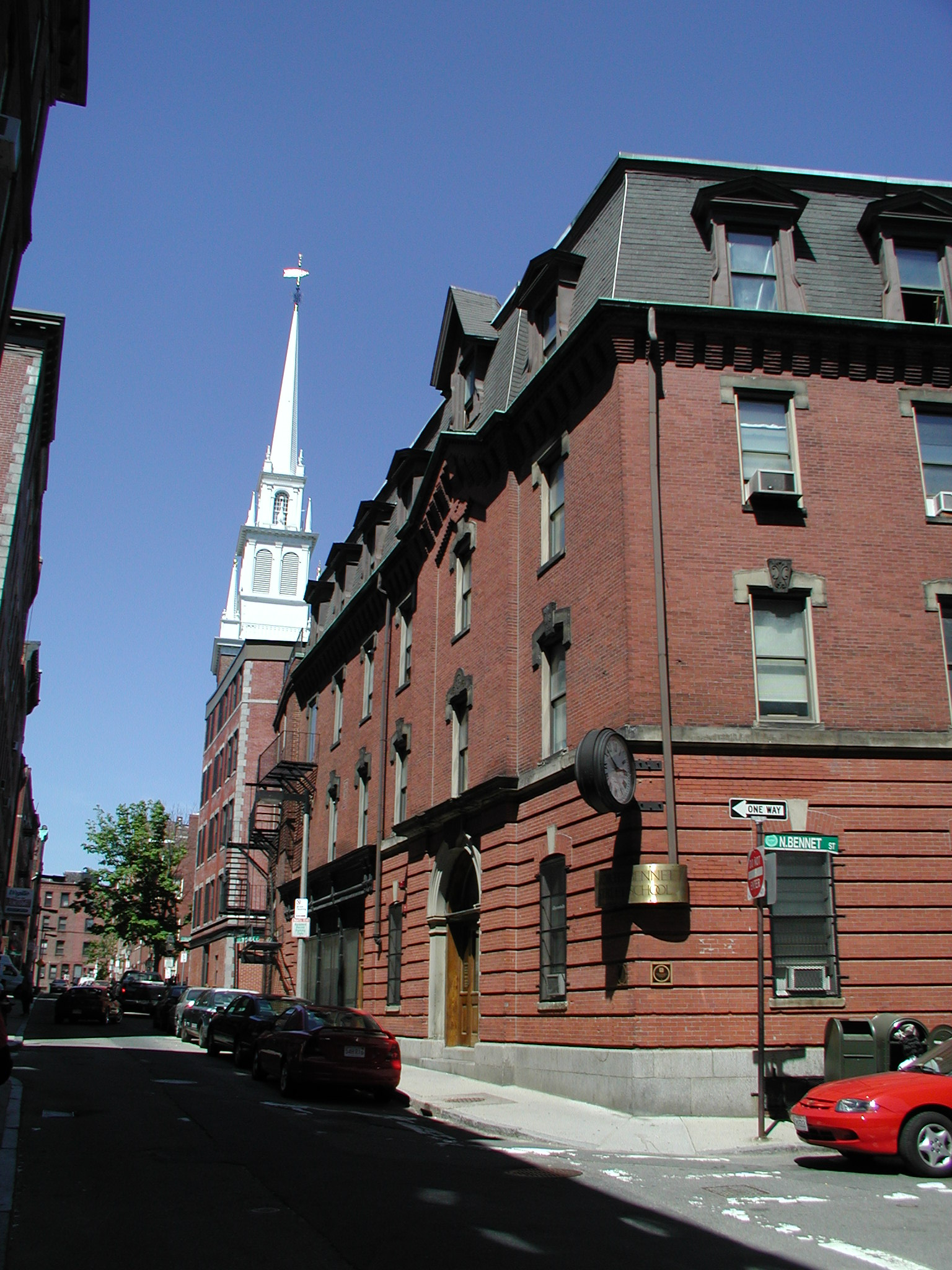
Building at 39 North Bennet Street

North Bennet Street Industrial School (NBSIS) was founded in 1881 and formally incorporated in 1885, following the purchase of the building at 39 North Bennet Street. Founded to help immigrants transition to American life, NBSIS pioneered a holistic approach to community service a century before the term became popular. NBSIS offered job skill training classes to men and unmarried women, mothers were offered courses in home economics, and various social clubs and summer trips to the country were incorporated into the program. The school's 1885 charter defined NBSIS as "an institution for training in industrial occupations persons of all ages, and for other educational and charitable work, and for furnishing opportunities for instruction and amusement to them, including libraries, reading rooms and whatever else may contribute to their physical and moral well being".

By 1891, manual training was a required part of public school education. NBSIS administered woodworking classes for boys and cooking classes for girls until 1913, when the public school system assumed responsibility for pre-vocational training. Public schools continued to rent equipment and space at North Bennet Street until 1937. Printing, taught by Louis Hull, was offered as one of the first courses offered to pre-vocational students.

=== Vocational training ===
In 1889, Mrs. Shaw brought Carl Fullen and Lars Eriksson, along with other sloyd teachers, to NBSIS. Originating in Sweden, the sloyd method of instruction involved using craft projects to facilitate education, aiming to "arouse a desire and pleasure in work; to accustom students to independence; to instill virtues of exactness, order and accuracy: and to train the attention". Students were given progressively more difficult projects that built on each other and they were expected to work on them as independently as possible. Gustaf Larsson became head of the sloyd program in 1891 and published a quarterly periodical on the principles of instruction. The school instituted training for teachers in the sloyd methodology, and Larsson estimated that over three hundred teachers had graduated from the sloyd training class by 1903. The sloyd project-based mode of teaching is still the basis of craft curriculums at North Bennet Street School.

The Boston Public Library established a branch at North Bennet Street Industrial School in 1899, with Edith Guerrier serving as librarian. Guerrier started evening discussion groups that, with the help of Edith Brown, developed into the Saturday Evening Girls Club.

Alvin E. Dodd was hired as the first professional administrator of the school in 1907. Dodd divided the school into several departments: plastic and graphic arts, mechanical arts, household arts, library, gymnasium, clubs, social service house, and buildings and administration. Each department was assigned a head and board members oversaw departments through committees. Certificates were awarded to individuals who completed prevocational and evening classes. A formal partnership developed between the North Bennet Street Industrial School and the Boston Trade School for the education of young women. By 1911, 28 salaried teachers and over fifty volunteers participated in teaching eleven hundred enrolled students.

In 1915, Dodd left the school to join the National Society for the Promotion of Industrial Education as its business manager, leaving George C. Greener, the former ceramics instructor, as the new director of the school. Drawing inspiration from John Ruskin and William Morris, two leaders of the Arts and Crafts Movement, Greener introduced weaving and courses in making light fixtures to the school. Greener provided the school with a new motto: "Hand and mind lead to life". The school's finances were precarious, and the copies of early American lighting fixtures produced by the students were sold to fund school programs. Similarly, the homespun, vegetable-dyed cloth produced by the weaving program was marketed through the Industrial Arts shop on Charles Street at the foot of Beacon Hill to provide income to both students and the school. The homespun cloth department lasted until 1932.

During this time, NBSIS, in cooperation with the City of Boston, developed a power machine operating class that paid wages to girls as they studied, combining academic work in the morning and vocational work in the afternoon. Local businesses, such as Filene's and Jordan Marsh, marketed aprons, curtains, shirts, lingerie and hospital garb produced by students in the program. The course was terminated in the 1950s.

Following World War I, Greener introduced a number of vocational classes for veterans, including watch repair, cabinet making, carpentry, printing, and jewelry engraving. Between 1946 and 1947, Greener introduced the trade courses that continue to be the basis for the school: cabinet and furniture making, jewelry making and engraving, carpentry, and piano tuning. Watch repair was also offered at this time.

Greener retired in 1954 and Ernest Jacoby, a Harvard graduate, was hired as the new director. As the demographics of the North End and the needs of the nation shifted, NBSIS went from training recent immigrants to training returning World War II veterans and disabled students referred by the Massachusetts Rehabilitation Commission. Jacoby retired in 1976 and Thomas B. Williams served as the school's director through the 1980s.

=== Recent history: Evolving mission ===
Building at 150 North Street

With middle-income professionals replacing immigrant populations in the North End, and other publicly funded organizations in place to serve the poor, NBSIS became known primarily as a center for training in fine crafts. In the 1980s, North Bennet Street Industrial School began transferring responsibilities for the operation of social service programs to the North End Union, while continuing administrative and financial support. The board voted to drop "Industrial" from the school's name and rewrote the school's articles of organization so that the objective was to "train adults, who have completed a minimum of secondary level education, in trades that require primarily manual skills and individualized work". The program offerings in carpentry, cabinet and furniture making, locksmithing, jewelry making and repair, and piano technology were expanded in the mid-1980s with courses in bookbinding, violin making, and preservation carpentry. These programs were specifically selected because bench skill programs in these fields were either lacking or underrepresented in the United States. Accreditation from the National Association of Trade and Technical Schools (NATTS) was awarded to the North Bennet Street School in 1982, and the United States Department of Education classified the school as a post-secondary institution.

The School completed renovations on the former Police Station One and former City of Boston Printing Plant in September 2013. The subsequent move to the fully renovated 65,000 sq. ft. facility at 150 North Street brought all of their programs under one roof.

== Notes ==
- Henry, S., & Williams, M. A. (1985). North Bennet Street School: A short history 1885–1985. Boston, MA: North Bennet Street School.
- Larsson, G. (1907). Sloyd for the three upper grades. Boston, MA: G.H. Ellis.
- Lazerson, M. (1971). Origins of the urban school. Boston, MA: Harvard University Press.
- Woods, R. A. (1902). A settlement study. Boston, MA: Houghton Mifflin and Co.
- Woods, R. A. (1923). The neighborhood in nation building. Boston, MA: Houghton Mifflin and Co.
