= Kirsty Gray =

Chairman of the World Board of the World Association of Girl Guides and Girl Scouts
- In office 2003–2005
- Preceded by: Kirsty Gray
- Succeeded by: Elspeth Henderson

Kirsty Gray was the chairman of the World Board of the World Association of Girl Guides and Girl Scouts from 2003 to 2005. Gray is a qualified chartered accountant. In 2005 she became the Head of Monitoring and Investigation for the Office of the Scottish Charity Regulator.

Gray made a special World Board pin which she gave to her successor, Elspeth Henderson, at the 32nd World Conference in Jordan. Henderson, in her turn, passed the pin to her successor at the closing ceremony of the 33rd World Conference.

== See also ==
World Association of Girl Guides and Girl Scouts
Preceded by Kirsty Gray	World Board Chairman; 2003 — 2005	Succeeded by Elspeth Henderson
