= Elspeth Henderson =

World Board Chairman of the World Association of Girl Guides and Girl Scouts
- In office 2005–2008
- Preceded by: Kirsty Gray
- Succeeded by: Margaret Treloar

Elspeth Henderson is former World Board Chairman of the World Association of Girl Guides and Girl Scouts (WAGGGS) and an educational consultant. She is Irish.

== Educational career ==
Henderson is a former vice-principal and principal of Mount Temple Comprehensive School in Dublin. In 2006, she was an educational consultant. She was president of the Wesley College Alumni from 2011-2012.

== Guiding and Scouting ==
Henderson has been involved with Guiding since childhood, as a Guide and a Ranger. As an adult, she has held numerous positions at both national and international levels. Between 1975 and 1989, she served the Irish Girl Guides as National Trainer, Chairman of the National Training Committee, Member of the National Executive Committee and International Commissioner.

== See also ==
- World Scout Committee

World Association of Girl Guides and Girl Scouts
Preceded by	Europe Region Chairman; 1989 — 1999	Succeeded by
Preceded by Kirsty Gray	World Board Chairman; 2005 — 2008	Succeeded by Margaret Treloar
