= Margaret Treloar =

Chair of the World Board of the World Association of Girl Guides and Girl Scouts
- In office 2008–2011
- Preceded by: Elspeth Henderson

Margaret Treloar is a Canadian food scientist and product development expert. She served as Chair of the World Board of the World Association of Girl Guides and Girl Scouts from 2008 to 2011. In 1984 she founded Treloar Product Development International Inc., a consulting firm specializing in improved methods for product development.

== See also ==
- World Scout Committee

World Association of Girl Guides and Girl Scouts
| Preceded by Elspeth Henderson | World Board Chairman; 2008 | Incumbent |
