= Helen M. Laird =

Electron-microscopist (1931–2020)

Helen Laird OBE, DL

President of the World Committee of the World Association of Girl Guides and Girl Scouts
- In office 1981–1984
- Preceded by: Joyce Price
- Succeeded by: Doris Stockmann

Personal details
- Born: 14 April 1931 Glasgow, Scotland
- Died: 18 April 2020 (aged 89)

Helen Mary Laird (14 April 1931 – 18 April 2020) was an electron-microscopist working laterally in the Veterinary Faculty Pathology department at the University of Glasgow.

== Early life and education ==
Laird was a pupil at St Columba's School, Kilmacolm and continued to be involved in the school throughout her life, serving on the board of governors until 1996.

== Career ==
Laird worked as part of a research team studying cancer, and particularly viruses in spontaneous feline leukaemia. She served on various committees of the Royal Microscopical Society.

== Girl Guiding ==
Laird was heavily involved in the Girl Guide movement, holding a number of positions in Scotland, UK and internationally. In 1960 she spent a six-month career break in Ghana training adult leaders on behalf of the World Association of Girl Guides and Girl Scouts (WAGGGS). In 1975 she was elected to the board of WAGGGS and served as chairperson from 1981-84. IN the 1980s she was chair of the Olave House fundraising committee.

In recognition of her contribution to Guiding, she received many national and international Guiding and Scouting awards including the 180th Bronze Wolf, Silver Fish (1980) and Juliette Gordon Low medals. Laird was appointed OBE in 1985 for services to Girl Guiding.

World Association of Girl Guides and Girl Scouts
Preceded by Joyce Price	President, World Committee; 1981–1984	Succeeded by Doris Stockmann

== Other ==
In the 1970s she was chair of the International Committee Youth Exchange. She was a member of Scottish Council For Community Education in 1979. In 1987, she was commissioned as a Deputy Lieutenant of the Lieutenancy of Renfrewshire, becoming one of the very few women so appointed at that time in Scotland. In the 1990s Laird was a member of the Board of World Mission, as part of the Church of Scotland.
