= Western Hemisphere Region (World Association of Girl Guides and Girl Scouts) =

WAGGGS divisional office in the Western Hemisphere

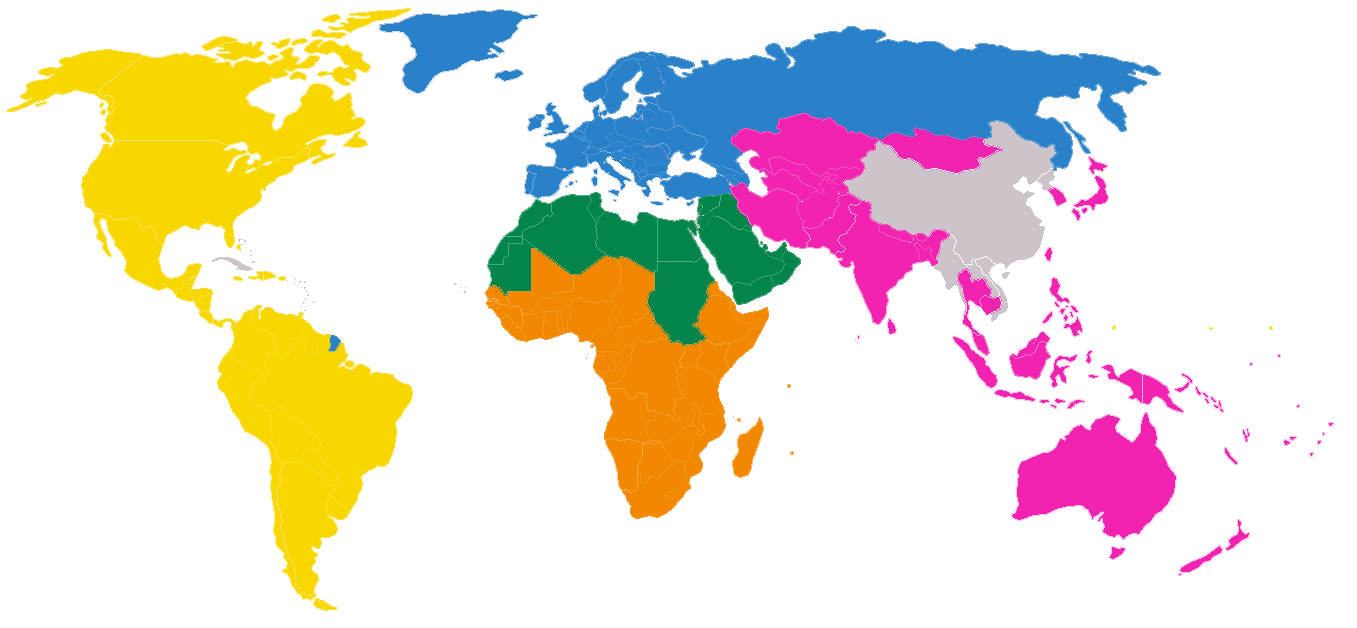
- Western Hemisphere Region shown in yellow
- Owner: World Association of Girl Guides and Girl Scouts
- Headquarters: Ciudad del Saber, Panama
- Website https://www.wagggs.org/en/our-world/western-hemisphere/

The WAGGGS-Western Hemisphere Region is the divisional office of the World Association of Girl Guides and Girl Scouts, which services Guiding and Scouting in North and South America. It was formed in 1940.

This region is the counterpart of the Interamerican Region of the World Organization of the Scout Movement (WOSM).
