= Ginny Radford =

New Zealand Girl Guides leader

Ginny Radford CNZM QSO
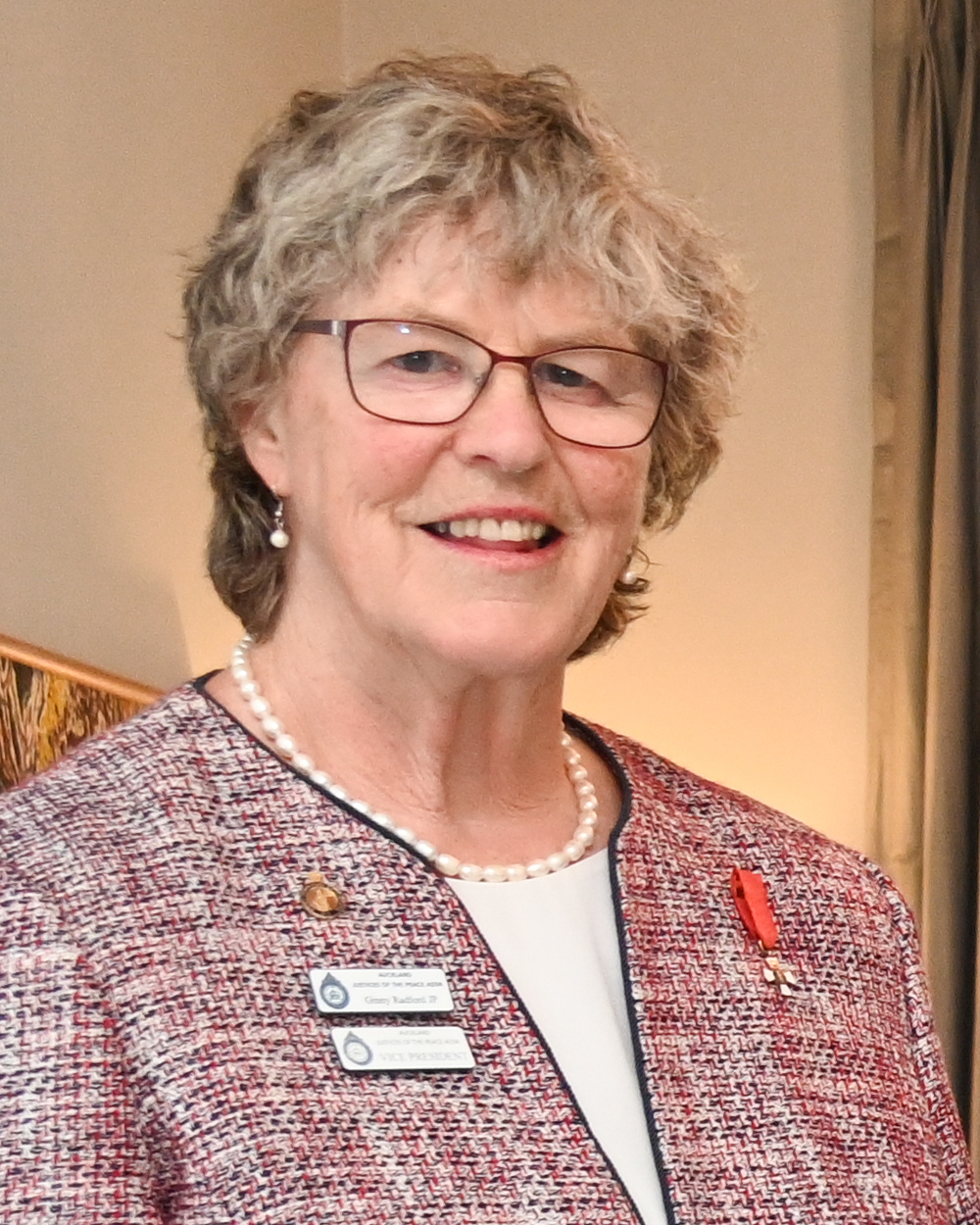
- Awards: Companion of the New Zealand Order of Merit, Companion of the Queen's Service Order

Academic background
- Education: University of Otago, Victoria University of Wellington

Virginia Margaret Radford CNZM QSO is a New Zealand girl guide leader. In 1997 she was appointed a Companion of the Queen's Service Order for community service, and in 2016 she was appointed a Companion of the New Zealand Order of Merit for services to Girl Guides.

== Early life and education ==
Radford joined the Brownies aged around seven. She worked as a teacher, and was the human resources and communications director at Fletcher Forests. She has a Bachelor of Science with Honours from Victoria University of Wellington, in zoology and mathematics, and an MBA from the University of Otago.

== Guiding career ==
In 1999 Radford was elected as chair of the board of the World Association of Girl Guides and Girl Scouts (WAGGGS). She is the only New Zealander to have held this position. She promoted guiding in more than twenty countries, and helped develop the long-term vision for the world association.

In 2012 she was appointed as director of the board of Girl Guides Australia. Radford also served as Vice Chairperson on the International Board of Trustees of the American Field Service (now AFS Intercultural Programs), having been elected to the board in 2008. Radford was a board member and Vice Chairperson of the Olave Baden-Powell Society, elected in 2005. The society is a network of supporters of WAGGGS, fundraising and keeping previous members in touch with guiding.

Radford is also vice president of the Auckland Justices of the Peace Association.

== Honours and awards ==
In the 1997 New Year Honours Radford was appointed a Companion of the Queen's Service Order for community service, and in the 2016 New Year Honours she was appointed a Companion of the New Zealand Order of Merit for services to Girl Guides.
