= Joyce Price =

Australian philanthropist

- Born: 8 August 1915; Nuriootpa, South Australia
- Died: 19 August 2009 (aged 94); Shoreham, Victoria
- Occupation: Philanthropist
- Known for: Leader of the Guide movement in Australia and of the World Association of Girl Guides and Girl Scouts
- Spouse: Sir Robert Price

Lady Joyce Ethyl Price (8 August 1915 – 19 August 2009) was an Australian philanthropist and a noted leader of the Guide movement in Australia and of the World Association of Girl Guides and Girl Scouts (WAGGGS).

== Biography ==
Joyce Price was born in Nuriootpa, South Australia. She married Sir Robert Price, the leading organic chemist. Lady Price died in Shoreham, Victoria at the age of 94.

== Girl Guide movement ==
Lady Price was chairman of the World Association of Girl Guides and Girl Scouts (1975–1981), the only person to serve two terms and the only Australian appointed to that position. As Chairman in 1977, she gave the address at the memorial service in Westminster Abbey for Lady Olave Baden-Powell, the World Chief Guide.

Earlier she was Victorian Commissioner (1963–1968) and Chief Commissioner for Australia (1968–1973). She was vice-president from 1985 to 1994 of the Olave Baden-Powell Society, a financial support organisation for WAGGGS.

== Honours and awards ==
The headquarters of Guides Victoria is named the Joyce Price Centre in her honour. She was awarded the Order of the British Empire (OBE) in 1968 and Companion of the Order of St Michael and St George (CMG) in 1978. She was awarded the Silver Fish in 1967. She was inducted onto the Victorian Honour Roll of Women in 2006.

World Association of Girl Guides and Girl Scouts
Preceded by Beryl Cozens-Hardy	President, World Committee; 1975–1981	Succeeded by Helen M. Laird
