= Kate Larson (historian) =

American historian

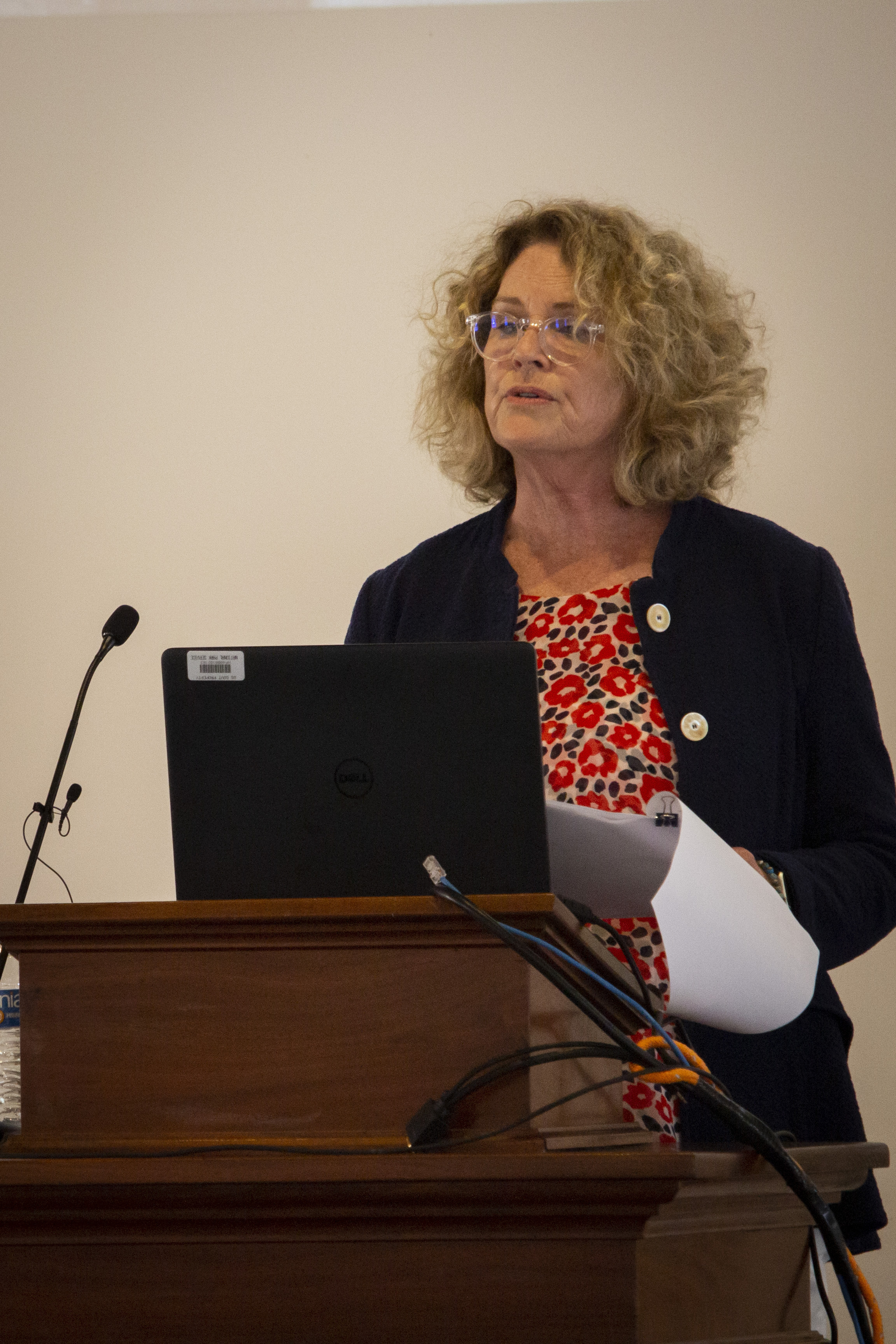
Kate Larson speaking

Kate Clifford Larson is a bestselling author, American historian and Harriet Tubman scholar. Her 2003 biography of Harriet Tubman, Bound for the Promised Land was one of the first non-juvenile Tubman biographies published in six decades. Kate Clifford Larson is the prize winning author of several other critically acclaimed biographies, including: Walk With Me: A Biography of Fannie Lou Hamer (Oxford, 2021) which received a starred *Kirkus review and named one of the Best Biographies of 2021.; Rosemary: The Hidden Kennedy Daughter (Houghton Mifflin Harcourt, 2015), which won the Massachusetts Book Award for Nonfiction in 2016 from Massachusetts Center for the Book, was the featured cover story for People Magazine, September 14, 2015, and named one of People Magazine’s top ten books for 2015; The Assassin’s Accomplice: Mary Surratt and the Plot to Kill Abraham Lincoln (Basic, 2008); and Harriet Tubman: A Reference Guide to Her Life and Works, Rowman & Littlefield, June 2022, which received a Library Journal Starred* Review and named one of the Best Reference Books of 2022. An award-winning historical consultant, she has worked on numerous public history initiatives for local, regional, state, and National Park Service projects. She has appeared on local, national, and international media outlets, mainstream media and cable networks, podcasts, and CBS Sunday Morning. Her next book, Ethel and Bobby: Inside the Marriage That Shaped a Nation is due out from Little, Brown & Company in 2027.

== Early life and education ==
Born and raised in Maine, Larson is graduate of Simmons College (B.A. Economics and History, 1980, M.A. 1995) and Northeastern University (MBA, 1986). After working for a number of years for a small regional investment banking firm in Boston, she earned her Ph.D. in American History (2003) from the University of New Hampshire. In 2016, UNH awarded her an honorary degree (Honor Causa). She is a full time author, historian, and consultant.

== Career ==
As Bound for the Promised Land was published, two other non-juvenile biographies of Tubman were published: Harriet Tubman: The Life and the Life Stories, by Jean M. Humez, and Harriet Tubman: The Road to Freedom by Catherine Clinton. Larson has worked as a consultant for the National Park Service on several Harriet Tubman projects, including a special resource study, historical contexts, interpretation and exhibit planning. She has also worked as an expert consultant for the State of Maryland on several interpretive projects including the Harriet Tubman Underground Railroad State and National Park Visitor Center, the 125-mile Harriet Tubman Underground Railroad Byway and All-American Road, "The Hidden Chesapeake: Through Harriet Tubman’s Eyes" heritage tourism project, and has documented, mapped and interpreted sites related to Underground Railroad activities in multiple counties across the state. Larson worked with the State of Delaware to develop a historic context for the history of slavery and freedom there, as well as assisting in the development of the 90-mile Harriet Tubman Byway through that state from the Maryland border to Pennsylvania. For more than two decades she has consulted with the Harriet Tubman Home in Auburn, NY, and more recently with the Harriet Tubman National Park in that city.

Larson has provided expert services for feature films, including Focus Features' Harriet starring Cynthia Erivo, and Robert Redford's The Conspirator; and numerous documentaries.

In 2001, Larson published an article titled "The Saturday Evening Girls: A Progressive Era Library Club and the Intellectual Life of Working Class and Immigrant Girls in Turn-of-the-Century Boston" in the journal The Library Quarterly. She has also written “Racing for Freedom: Harriet Tubman’s Underground Railroad Network Through New York,” Afro-Americans In New York Life and History, Vol. 36 No. 1, January 2012, and contributed articles and reviews to a variety of other publications. Most recently, she has published “Through Her Eyes: Discover a Hidden Side of the Chesapeake Along the Harriet Tubman Byway,” Chesapeake Bay Magazine, September 8, 2022; “The Sharecropper and The President: Two Leaders at the Crossroads Of Democracy,” Leader to Leader, Spring 2022; “Harriet Tubman: A Life Beyond Myths,” Ms. Magazine, Spring 2022; and, “Writing a Woman’s Trauma: Balancing Fannie Lou Hamer’s silence with newly recovered testimony.” Women’s History Network, Oct. 2021.

== Awards and honors ==
- Team Award, Third Place, 2020 National Association of Interpretation Interpretive Media Award for “Harriet Tubman: Soldier of Freedom,” orientation film for Harriet Tubman Underground Railroad State and National Park;
- First Place, 2018 National Association of Interpretation Digital Media Award for Harriet Tubman Byway website and guide;
- Wilbur H. Siebert Award, National Park Service Network to Freedom Program for outstanding research on Harriet Tubman, her community, and the Underground Railroad. September 2015.Wilbur H. Siebert Award, National Park Service Network to Freedom Program, for outstanding research on Harriet Tubman, her community, and the Underground Railroad. September 2015.
- Commendation, South Carolina House of Representatives Resolution, Bill 4234, for “significant work” on the life of Harriet Tubman. March 2013.
- Education Excellence Award 2007, Maryland Historical Trust. For the Finding a Way to Freedom Harriet Tubman Underground Railroad Tour, Dorchester and Caroline counties, Maryland.
- Legacy Fellowship, American Antiquarian Society, Worcester, Mass.
- Price Research Fellowship, William L. Clements Library, University of Michigan
- Fellowship, John Nicholas Brown Center for the Study of American Civilization, Brown University
- University Dissertation Fellowship, University of New Hampshire
- Margaret Storrs Grierson Scholar-in-Residence Fellowship, Sophia Smith Collection, Smith College, Northampton, Mass.
- Mary Catherine Mooney Fellowship, Boston Athenaeum
- and other fellowship and research enhancement awards from the University of New Hampshire.

== See also ==
- Kate Larson in Harriet Tubman
