= UnLtd =

UK charitable organisation

UnLtd - The Foundation for Social Entrepreneurs
- Founded: 2000
- Registration no.: Charity #1090393; company #4180639
- Location: Head office: London, England
- Region served: United Kingdom
- Method: Cash awards, grants, social investment, leadership development, practical support, networking
- Endowment: £100 million from the Millennium Commission and partnering funders
- Employees: ~60
- Website: www.unltd.org.uk

UnLtd - The Foundation for Social Entrepreneurs is a charitable organisation in the United Kingdom.

The organisation offers cash awards, grants, business support, networking and mentorship opportunities for social entrepreneurs in the UK.

== History ==
UnLtd was formed in 2000 by seven non-profit organisations: Ashoka: Innovators for the Public, Changemakers, Community Action Network (CAN), Comic Relief, The Scarman Trust, SENSCOT, and The School for Social Entrepreneurs (SSE).

The awards are funded by the income generated by a £100 million endowment from the Millennium Commission as a permanent source of grants for individuals throughout the United Kingdom to develop their skills and talents, and to contribute to the community; the income from the endowment is held by the Millennium Awards, of which UnLtd is the sole Trustee. John Rafferty was the first Chief Executive who with Sandra Jetten COO successfully negotiated the grant of £100 million from the Millennium Commission and established the network of UK wide offices and staff. From 2006 to 2015 UnLtd was headed by Cliff Prior, who went on to become Chief Executive at Big Society Capital. Mark Norbury became Chief Executive in May 2016.

== Programs ==
Through its support, UnLtd provides a combination of cash funding, investment, support, networking opportunities and pro bono services to entrepreneurs. The awards range from £2,500 to £20,000. Their social investment fund provides larger scale investment capital to more established social ventures.

UnLtd Research studies the impact of the support UnLtd gives to early start social entrepreneurs, and the impact they have on the worlds in which they live. UnLtd has partnerships with academic institutions UCL, Open University, Middlesex University, University of Birmingham.

UnLtd established an investment team in 2016, investing directly into more established social ventures.

The organisation's funding throughout the UK is divided throughout five regions: London, The South and the East of England, The North of England and the Midlands, Scotland, Northern Ireland and Wales.

== Partnerships ==
UnLtd works with a range of corporates, trusts & foundations, and charities.

== See also ==
- Social entrepreneurship
- Social enterprise
- Social firm
- Social business enterprise
