= Wingaersheek Beach =

Beach in Massachusetts

Coordinates: 42°39′0″N 70°41′3″W

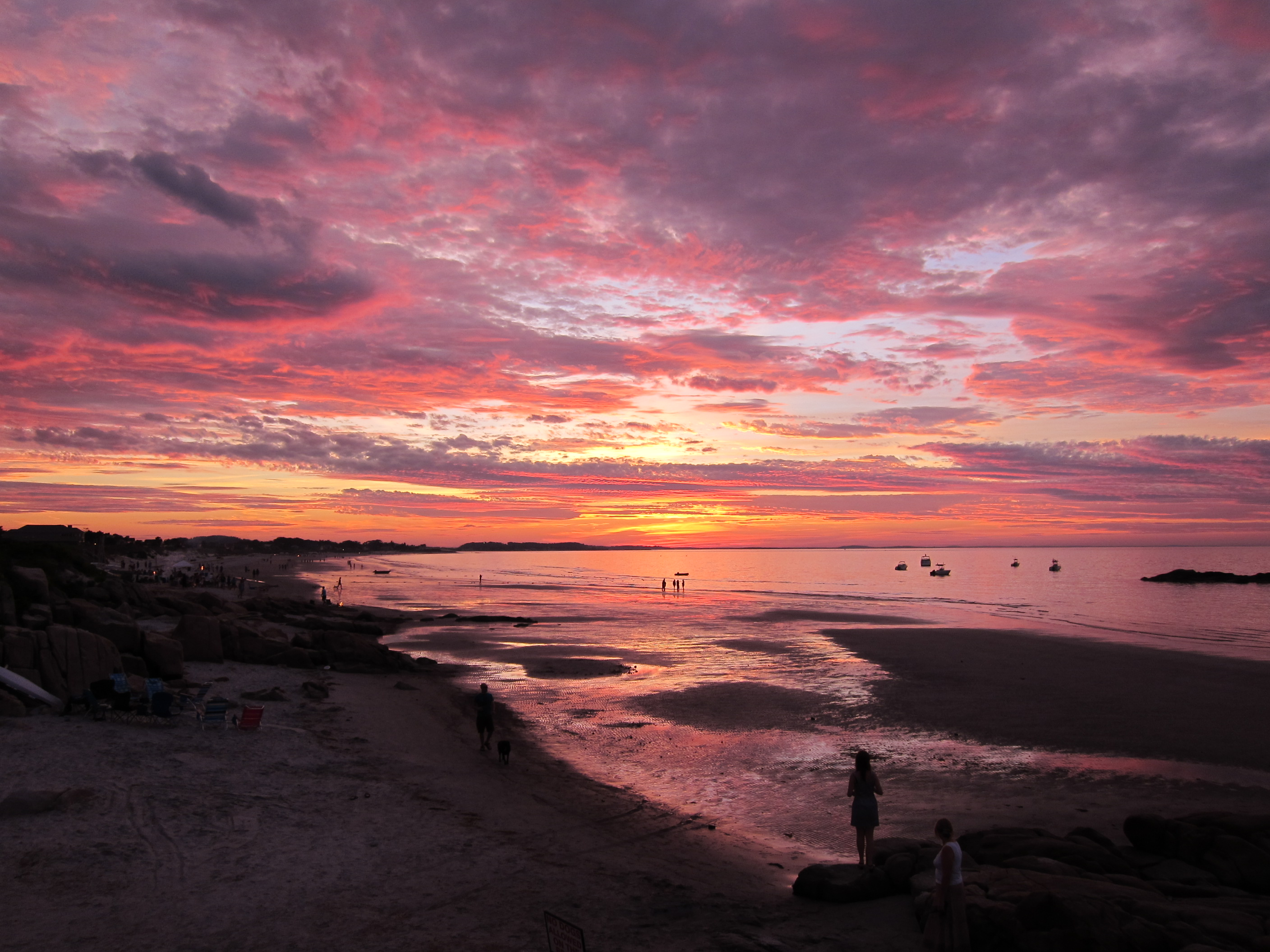
Wingaersheek beach at sunset

Wingaersheek Beach is a 0.6-mile (0.97 km) long beach located on the Annisquam River in West Gloucester, Massachusetts, United States.

According to the USGS the name is a corruption of the earlier Dutch name "Wyngaerts Hoeck", which was derived from "Wyngaerton" (meaning "Vineland"). The name was described by Professor Trumbull as "not Indian" and stated by Professor E. N. Horsford to be "an undoubted corruption of the German (Low Dutch) name, "Wyngaerts Hoeck", which occurs on many maps between 1630 and 1670, especially in Ogilby's "America"." The beach was alternatively called Coffins Beach for Peter Coffin whose farm was located alongside this beach."

The popularity of Wingaersheek Beach, as well as the nearby Good Harbor Beach, has resulted in traffic jams in the area. The town of Gloucester forbids dogs entirely from all Gloucester beaches from May 1 to September 30 (from April 1 to September 30 for Good Harbor Beach). Since January 2015, a local law came into place that allows unleashed dogs on Wingaersheek Beach only on odd numbered days and Good Harbor Beach only on even numbered days.
