= Edith Guerrier =

American librarian

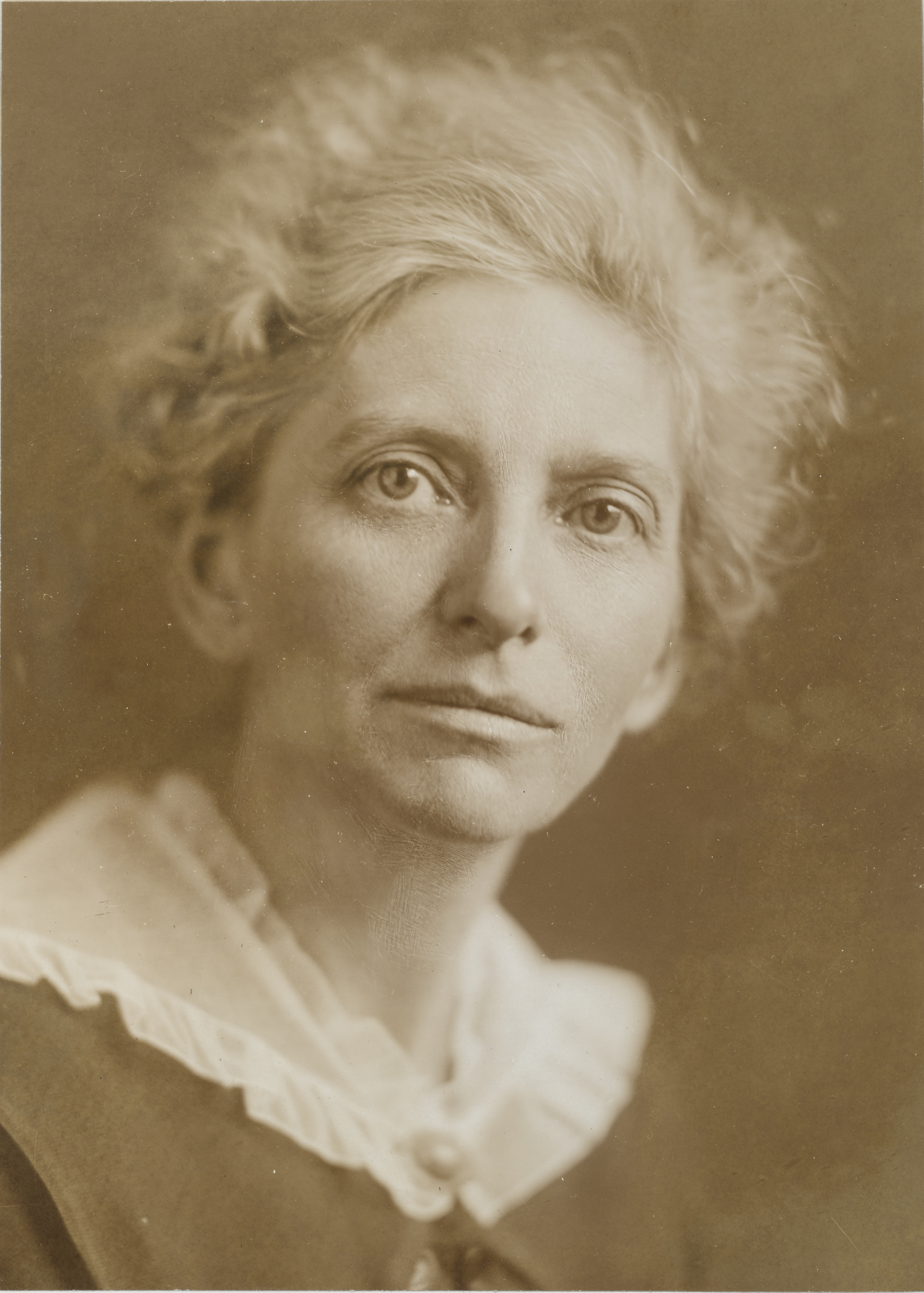
- Born: 1870
- Died: 1958
- Occupation: Librarian

Edith Guerrier (1870–1958) was a pioneer in the field of library science. Guerrier is best known for developing progressive library programs in the 1890s, including a reading program and a pottery studio for girls of Boston's North End, an urban immigrant center during the Progressive Era.

== Biography ==
=== Early life ===
Guerrier was born in 1870 in New Bedford, Massachusetts. Her father, George Guerrier, was an English immigrant who served in the American Civil War as a Second Lieutenant of Colored Infantry. Edith's mother, Emma Guerrier (Ricketson) died when Guerrier was a young child. Guerrier spent a great deal of her childhood separated from her father and his side of the family due to his difficulty finding steady work. She lived at times with her late mother's siblings, Anna and Walton Ricketson and her elderly Uncle Fox on her father's side. Guerrier later said of the Ricketson side of the family, a group of "well-to-do abolitionists, naturalists, and transcendentalists," that it was much like "com[ing] back to my own people." The Ricketsons were friends with individuals such as Henry David Thoreau, Ralph Waldo Emerson, and the family of Amos Broson Alcott, which affected Guerrier's worldview.

=== Move to Boston ===
In 1887, Guerrier's father sent Guerrier to school at the Vermont Methodist Seminary and Female College in Montpelier, Vermont. She graduated on June 25, 1891, after four years. Upon graduation, Guerrier moved to Boston's North End. Guerrier originally moved to Boston hoping to become an artist. With monetary help from her father, she attended classes at Boston's Museum of Fine Arts. She met Edith Brown there, a fellow student, and the two formed a fast friendship. Brown and Guerrier's friendship turned into a lifelong personal and professional partnership.

=== North Bennett Street nursery ===
The funds Guerrier's father provided for her to attend school full-time were not enough, so Guerrier got a job at the nursery of the North Bennett Street Industrial School. The nursery, which catered to the families of lower class immigrants, was run by philanthropist and educator Pauline Agassiz Shaw. At the time, Boston's North End was one of the most densely populated urban and immigrant centers in the United States.

The North Bennett Street services "underwent enormous shifts" similar to other changes seen in social welfare programs during the Progressive Era. It was originally meant to train "widows and the wives of incapacitated husbands" in vocational aspects, but by the 1890s when Guerrier joined the nursery, its programming was evolving to reflect principles of the Settlement House movement. Guerrier became the custodian for the North Bennett Street delivery station of the Boston Public Library and also became the coordinator of its reading room.

== Career ==
The nursery "developed community-based programmes aimed at overcoming social obstacles for the immigrant community" and it helped immigrant families become integrated into the American way of life. While working on these programs, Guerrier found that the children's and youth programs at the North Bennett nursery were mostly targeted to boys. The few programs that targeted girls were "domestically oriented" and were "geared towards the reinforcement of gender-based role expectations." As a result, in 1899, Guerrier decided to create a girls' reading club.

=== Saturday Evening Girls ===
The reading groups Guerrier developed became very popular with girls in the community, especially a group of older girls who called themselves the Saturday Evening Girls. The Saturday Evening Girls were one of the original groups Guerrier worked with. Guerrier had a love for storytelling, plays, and folktales, which the Saturday Evening Girls soon incorporated into their meetings. The girls learned how to produce and put on performances, including operas, folktales, and plays. The Saturday Evening Girls also studied classic and current literature, social philosophy, and political discourse. The club was not just effective in improving literacy, Guerrier also enlisted members of the Boston intellectual elite to speak to the reading group, "bringing the club's constituency into personal contact with prominent theologians, politicians, writers, and social reformers of the time."

The group was made up of "daughters of Jewish, Eastern European, and southern Italian immigrants," which typically did not mix in the community as "invisible boundaries existed" based on language, religion, creed, and nationality. For many of the girls, this was the first time they were spending time with people of a different background.

Guerrier believed the groups should govern themselves. As a result, the Saturday Evening Girls created a newsletter, The SEG News, which ran from 1913 to 1917 and "reported on the activities of the club," news of its membership, reviews of events, informational pieces regarding the community of North End, editorials, and original work.

With the success of the Saturday Evening Girls, Guerrier developed reading clubs for other age groups, from fourth graders to high school-aged girls. Every group met on a different day of the week and time and called themselves after their meeting day and time. By 1915, there were over 250 enrolled in Guerrier's reading clubs. Working with the Saturday Evening Girls led Guerrier to believe that libraries could and should implement services for children into their mission.

=== Paul Revere Pottery ===
During this time period, Edith Brown and Guerrier spent time traveling to Europe. While there, they noticed the local women selling arts and crafts that they had created. After working with the Saturday Evening Girls, they decided that the members could also earn money by selling items they crafted. Soon, The Saturday Evening Club branched out to form another club named the Paul Revere Pottery Club. Edith Brown and Guerrier helped oversee the creation of pottery pieces by the girls. This enabled the immigrant women to become skilled in a certain task, in hopes that they would be able to better provide for their families. Pottery works the students created and sold became an important source of income for the club members.

=== Other work ===
While running these clubs, Guerrier also became a librarian at the North End Branch Library in Boston. In 1917, Guerrier took a six-month paid leave from her position at the library to volunteer her time in Washington D.C. for Herbert Hoover's National Food Administration. While there, she was in charge of collecting, organizing and distributing information to many public libraries throughout the country, and she started the Food Administration Library Information Service. She initiated a bulletin named the Food News Notes for Librarians, which lasted for thirteen issues during 1917. Guerrier believed the library could play a larger role in American society than most thought possible:

"My business of making the library play a vital part in the organization took me to every department head in turn, as it was necessary to point out to these chiefs the services public libraries could offer as advertising agencies and mediums of approach to the American public"

In the fall of 1917, Guerrier took a trip around the country to hand out bulletins for Herbert Hoover's Food Administration. The trip started in D.C. and sent Guerrier to cities such as Columbus, Ohio; Denver, Colorado; Los Angeles, California and Missoula, Montana.

Before she left for Washington D.C. to return to Boston, Guerrier took on yet another challenge. She believed the libraries of the time did a great deal of work that was underappreciated, and she thought they lacked sufficient government funding. She soon began to work on a new set of bulletins, named the National Library Service. Guerrier wanted to send out these bulletins to all of the libraries to which the bulletins for the Food Administration had been sent, which totaled to more than eight thousand libraries.

Over the course of the following year, Guerrier and her fellow librarian professionals spent a great deal of time trying to get a bill passed by Congress. They believed that there should be a national service that kept librarians up to date with all new material published by the government. Together with a helpful Congressman from California, the women drafted a bill. Unfortunately, after a great deal of time and hard work, the bill was not passed.

Over the course of those years, Guerrier spent time compiling a book titled The Federal Executive Departments as Sources of Information for Libraries. This book was a compilation of letters written by Guerrier herself and those of which she co-authored with powerful men of that time. Included are letters from Secretary of War Newton Diehl Baker and Assistant Secretary of the Navy Franklin D. Roosevelt, who then made changes to the letters as they saw fit. The book was prefaced by President Woodrow Wilson. Upon the completion of her book in 1919, Guerrier returned to work at the Boston Public Library as the "Supervisor of Circulation," because her old position had long ago been filled. With time, Guerrier became the supervisor of the branch libraries in Boston.

== Retirement ==
Edith Guerrier and Brown spent the following years living and working in Boston. In 1932, at the age of 60, Edith Guerrier's partner of almost 40 years, Edith Brown died. Eight years later, in 1940, Guerrier was reluctantly forced into retirement. During her retirement, she remained active, volunteering as a librarian of the Massachusetts Committee on Public Safety. Also during this time, she penned another book, titled We Pledged Allegiance, a Librarian's Intimate Story of the United States Food Administration. In 1958, Edith Guerrier died at the age of eighty-eight.
