= Membership levels of the Girl Scouts of the USA =

The Girl Scouts of the USA has six levels: Daisy, Brownie, Junior, Cadette, Senior and Ambassador. Girl Scouts move or "bridge" to the next level, usually at the end of the school year, when they reach the age of advancing. The Ambassador level is the most recent, having been added in 2011. They are considered in the appropriate level based on their grade on October 1, the start of each new Girl Scout year. There are exceptions for "special needs," but Girl Scouts who are "young in grade" have not been specifically considered. Each year of membership in Girl Scouting is represented on the uniform by a small, golden, six-pointed membership star (one per year) with colored background discs which represent a level. Girl Scouts wear uniforms consisting of a white shirt and khaki bottom under the appropriate uniform item for their level: Cookie (siblings of a girl scout before Kindergarten), a blue tunic or vest for Daisies (kindergarten and grade 1), a brown sash or vest for Brownies (grades 2-3), a green vest or sash for Juniors (grades 4-5) and a tan sash or vest for the older girl levels of Cadettes (grades 6-8), Seniors (grades 9-10) and Ambassadors (grades 11-12). All uniform tunics, vests, or sashes must include the American flag patch, council ID patches troop numbers, and a yellow, brown, green, or navy tab with the WAGGGS pin and the membership pin.

== Daisies ==
The modern Girl Scout Daisies tunic badge layout.

Daisy is the initial level of Girl Scouting. Named for Juliette "Daisy" Gordon Low, they are in kindergarten and first grade (around ages 5–7). They meet in minimally groups of five girls with two adult leaders who help the girls plan activities to introduce them to Girl Scouts.

Daisies earn the Promise Center and Petals, which focus on the Girl Scout Law and are placed on the front of the tunic in a daisy design. They also earn Leaves and Journey Leadership Awards. Their uniform consists of a light blue tunic. They may also wear their tunic with a white shirt and khaki bottoms or with an official Girl Scout Daisy uniform. The Girl Scout Membership Star is worn with blue membership disks and they wear the Girl Scout Daisy Membership Pin.

Daisies use the Girl's Guide to Girl Scouting for Daisies and the National Leadership Journeys to work on activities, may camp only with a parent present, and have the option to sell Girl Scout cookies. They may earn the Daisy Safety Award and the Bridge to Brownies Award.

== Brownies ==
Brownies are in second and third grades (around ages 7–9). and earn triangular shaped Brownie Leadership Journey Awards and National Proficiency Badges. Their uniform consists of a brown vest or sash which may be worn with a white shirt and khaki bottoms or with an official Brownie uniform. The Girl Scout Membership Star is worn with green membership disks, and they wear the Brownie Membership Pin.

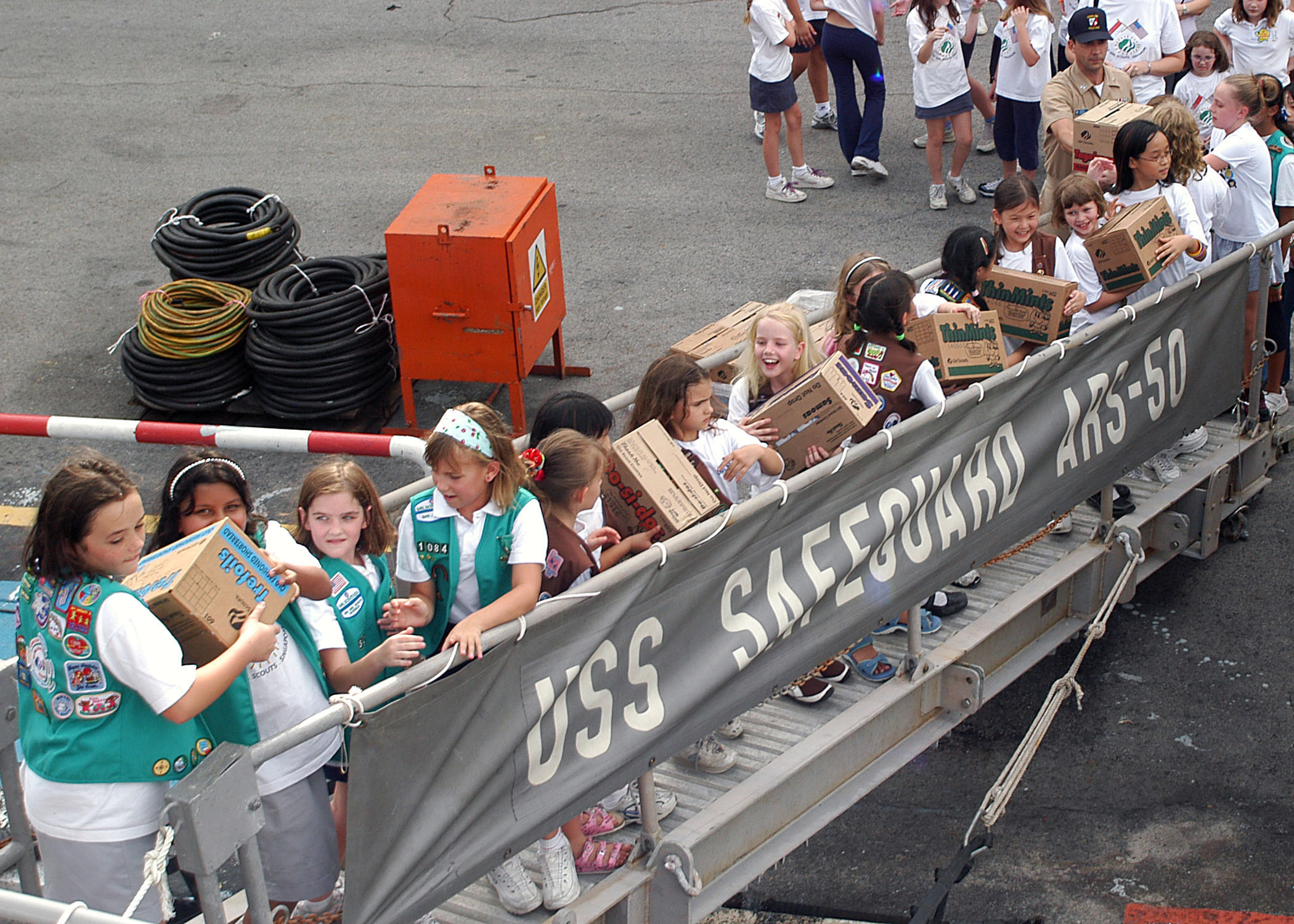
Girl Scout Brownies (right, brown vests) and Juniors (left, teal vests) at a charity event.

Brownies use the Girl's Guide to Girl Scouting for Brownies and the National Leadership Journeys to work on badges and activities. They may earn the Bridge to Juniors Award and the Brownie Safety Award.

Unlike some of the other levels, the name Brownie is commonly used with Girl Scout/Girl Guide organizations around the world and has its origin from Brownies in the British Girl Guides.

== Juniors ==
Juniors are in fourth and fifth grades (around ages 9–11). Their uniform is a green vest or sash which may be worn with a white shirt and khaki bottoms.

Juniors are the first level to wear the official Girl Scout Membership Pin on their uniform. The Girl Scout Membership Star is worn with yellow membership disks. They use the Girl's Guide to Girl Scouting for Juniors and the National Leadership Journeys to work on badges and activities. They earn circle-shaped Junior Leadership Journey Awards and National Proficiency Badges. Badges require more skill at this level as the girls gain proficiency. They may earn the Girl Scout Junior Safety Award, the Junior Aide Award, and the Bridge to Cadettes Award.

Juniors are eligible to earn the Bronze Award, the highest award in Girl Scouting available at this level.

== Cadettes ==
Cadettes are Girl Scouts who are in sixth, seventh, and eighth grades (around ages 11–14). Their uniform is a khaki vest or sash with white shirts and khaki bottoms. They wear the official Girl Scout Membership Pin on their uniform. The Girl Scout Membership Star is worn with white membership disks.

Cadettes use the Girl's Guide to Girl Scouting for Cadettes and the National Leadership Journeys to earn diamond shaped badges. Typically, Girl Scouts at this level are encouraged to assume leadership roles within them, such as assisting in leading and coordinating service unit or association events. They may also earn the Cadette Program Aide award, the Cadette Community Service Bar, the Cadette Service to Girl Scouting Bar, the Cadette Safety Award and the Bridge to Senior Award. They are eligible to earn the Silver Award, which is the highest award available to girls at this level.

== Seniors ==
Seniors are Girl Scouts who are in ninth and tenth grade (around ages 14–16). They wear the same uniform as Cadettes—however, the disks for their membership stars are red and their badges are a rectangular shape.

Seniors use the Girl's Guide to Girl Scouting for Seniors and the National Leadership Journeys to earn badges. They are typically encouraged to create and lead activities for the younger Girl Scouts, and to take a leadership role in organizing and assisting with Council and service unit/association events and activities. They may earn the Counselor-in-Training (CIT), the Volunteer-in-Training (VIT), the Girl Scout Senior Safety Award, the Gold Torch Award, the Senior Community Service Bar, the Senior Service to Girl Scouting Bar and the Bridge to Girl Scout Ambassador award.

Seniors are eligible to earn the Gold Award.

== Ambassadors ==
Ambassadors are Girl Scouts who are in eleventh and twelfth grade (around ages 16-18). They wear the same khaki-colored vest or sash as Cadettes and Seniors. The Girl Scout Membership Star is worn with navy membership disks.

Ambassadors use the Girl's Guide to Girl Scouting for Ambassadors and the National Leadership Journeys to earn badges that are shaped like an octagon. They may earn the Counselor-in-Training (CIT), the Counselor-in-Training (CIT) II, the Volunteer-in-Training (VIT), the Ambassador Community Service Bar, the Ambassador Service to Girl Scouting Bar, the Gold Torch Award, the Ambassador Safety Award, and the Bridge to Adult Award.

Ambassadors are eligible to earn the Gold Award.

== Adults ==
Adults, both men and women, can join Girl Scouts and participate as leaders or in other volunteer roles. They do not need to have a child in the program in order to volunteer with Girl Scouts.

== History ==
Initially the United States Girl Scout program, started in 1912, had one level for girls ages ten through seventeen, but it soon added two more levels. Brownies for younger girls was officially recognized in the mid-1920s though it had existed earlier. At the same time older girls (over eighteen or over sixteen if First Class Scouts) became known as Senior Scouts.

In 1938 age divisions were set as

- Brownies (ages seven through nine)
- Intermediates (ages ten through thirteen)
- Seniors (ages fourteen through seventeen)

In 1963 this was rearranged to

- Brownies (ages seven through nine)
- Juniors (ages nine through eleven)
- Cadettes (ages eleven through fourteen)
- Seniors (ages fourteen through seventeen)

In the 1970s the age divisions were

- Pixies (ages five through six) Pixies was a pilot program, available only in limited areas.
- Brownies (ages seven through nine)
- Juniors (ages nine through eleven)
- Cadettes (ages eleven through fourteen)
- Seniors (ages fourteen through seventeen)

In 1984, the Daisy program for kindergartners (age five) was introduced, and around 2003 the Studio 2B program for girls eleven through seventeen was introduced as a way to give older girls more options in Girl Scouts, although many girls still called themselves Cadettes and Seniors. STUDIO 2B was discontinued as a program option in 2007.

- Daisies (5-6 years old or in kindergarten)
- Brownies (6–8 years old or in grades 1–3)
- Juniors (8–12 years old or in grades 4–6. In some situations, girls age eight and in third grade may be Juniors.)
- Cadettes (12–14 years old or in grades 7–9. In some situations, girls age eleven and in sixth grade may be Cadettes.)
- Seniors (14–17 years old or in grades 9–12)

In 2008 another reorganization took place. All levels were changed to have Girl Scouts at the start of their name, e.g. "Girl Scout Brownies" instead of "Brownie Girl Scouts", and levels were changed to be by grade only instead of by age or grade. Daisies were expanded to first grade, Brownies were moved up to second grade and Ambassadors were added.

- Daisies (grades K–1)
- Brownies (grades 2–3)
- Juniors (grades 4–5)
- Cadettes (grades 6–8)
- Seniors (grades 9–10)
- Ambassadors (grades 11–12)

Outside the age level programs, there have been somewhat separate programs for Mariner Scouts (1934–present) and Wing Scouts (1941–1970s).

In addition, there are Girl Scouts known as Juliettes, who are independent of any troop due to lack of a troop to join or because other commitments do not allow them to actively participate with available troops. In 2001, Stefanie Argus, an eighth-grade student, created Juliettes, an official designation for independent Girl Scouts, as her Silver Award Project. "I wanted to create something to tell other girls who left their troops they belong to the Girl Scouts," Argus said. A Juliette is still placed in her appropriate grade level and works on program as would any other girl her age in a regular troop.
