= Interest Project =

Earned award in the Girl Scouts of the USA

An Interest Project was an earned award for the Cadette and Senior levels of Girl Scouts of the USA. In the Fall of 2011, a new program was introduced and Interest Projects were retired.

A poster of Interest Projects found in many Girl Scout offices.

They were earned through completing skill-building activities and certain requirements. Each Interest Project comes as a patch or badge and each represent an achievement in a different area such as camping or first aid. The badges are sewn onto the bottom left and right sections of the vest and the lower half of the sash uniform parts.

== List of badges ==
'Items marked by * are not pictured'

- A World of Understanding
- All About Birds
- American Patriotism
- Architecture & Environmental Design
- Artistic Crafts
- Backpacking
- Build a Better Future
- B Xtreme! *
- Camping
- Car Sense
- Child Care
- Collecting
- Computers in Everyday Life
- Conflict Resolution
- Cookies & Dough
- Couch Potato *
- Creative Cooking
- Desktop Publishing
- Digging Through The Past
- Do You Get The Message
- Dollars and Sense
- Eco-Action
- Emergency Preparedness
- Exploring the Net
- Family Living
- Fashion Design & Crafting
- Folk Arts
- The Food Connection
- From A to V: Audiovisual Production
- From Fitness to Fashion
- From Shore to Sea
- From Stress to Success
- Games for Life
- Generations Hand in Hand
- Global Girls *
- G.O. Girl! *
- Graphic Communications
- Heritage Hunt
- High Adventure
- Hi-tech Hide & Seek *
- Home Improvement
- Horse Sense
- In the Pink *
- Inventions and Inquiry
- Invitation to the Dance
- It's About Time
- Just Jewelry
- Law and Order
- Leadership
- The Lure of Language
- Math, Maps, and More
- Media Savvy
- Museum Discovery
- On a High Note
- On the Courts
- On the Playing Field
- On Your Own *
- Once Upon a Story
- Orienteering
- Outdoor Survival
- Paddle, Pole, and Roll
- Paper Works
- The Performing Arts
- Pets
- Photography
- Planet Power
- Plant Life
- The Play's the Thing
- Public Relations
- Reading
- Rolling Along
- Sew Glam *
- Smooth Sailing
- Space Exploration
- Sports for Life
- Textile Arts
- Travel
- Uncovering the Evidence *
- Understanding Yourself and Others
- Visual Arts
- Water Sports
- Why in the World?
- Wildlife
- Women through Time
- Women's Health
- Writing for Real
- Your Best Defense
- Your Own Business

== See also ==
- Membership levels of the Girl Scouts of the USA
- Studio 2B
