= Gold Award (Girl Scouts of the USA) =

Highest achievement within the Girl Scouts of the USA

- Owner: Girl Scouts of the USA
- Created: 1980

The Gold Award is the highest achievement within the Girl Scouts of the USA, earned by Senior and Ambassador Girl Scouts. Only 5.4% of eligible Girl Scouts earn the Gold Award.

== History ==
Girl Scout's highest award was created in 1916 and evolved over the years.

=== Golden Eaglet of Merit: 1916 to 1918 ===
This award was a pin of an eagle with its wings spread, on a red, white, and blue ribbon.

=== Golden Eaglet: 1919 to 1938 ===
In 1919 the name of the award was changed to the Golden Eaglet. Requirements for the award ranged through these years from earning 14 out of 17 specific badges, earning the Medal of Merit, earning a different number of badges, and the acceptance of a letter of Commendation instead of the Medal of Merit. The award emblem changed from the spread-winged eagle and ribbon to an eagle with half-furled wings and a "G" and an "S" on either side of its head.

The founder of Girl Scouts, Juliette Gordon Low, wrote in November 1923: “The five requirements for winning the Golden Eaglet are character, health, handicraft, happiness and service, and that others will expect to find in our Golden Eaglet a perfect specimen of girlhood: mentally, morally, and physically.”

=== First Class: 1938 to 1940 ===
In 1938 the Golden Eaglet changed to the First Class Award.

=== Curved Bar: 1940 to 1963 ===
This award was earned by Intermediate Scouts who had already earned the First Class Award and was a bridge to Senior rank. Because of the shortage of metal during WWII, at first the award was a curved embroidered patch worn on the uniform. In 1947, the Curved Bar pin was introduced.

=== First Class: 1963 to 1980 ===
In 1963 the award reverted to being called First Class. Requirements for earning the First Class Award changed over the 17 years it was offered. Beginning in 1963, Cadette Scouts were required to earn four Challenges, plus at least six badges in specific areas:

- Social Dependability
- Emergency Preparedness
- Active Citizenship
- Girl Scout Promise

In 1972, eight new Challenges were offered:

- Arts
- Community Action
- Environment
- International Understanding
- Knowing Myself
- My Heritage
- Out-of-Doors
- Today's World

The Scout was permitted to choose any four of the twelve Challenges.

In addition to the four Challenges, a Scout was required to earn at least one badge in each of six areas:

- Arts
- Home
- Citizenship
- Out-of-Doors
- Health and Safety
- International Understanding

Alternately, from 1972 to 1980, a Scout could earn any seven of the twelve Challenges, with no badge requirements.

=== Gold Award: since 1980 ===
==== 1980 to 2004 ====
In 1980 the Gold Award was introduced. In 1990, National Council Session delegates approved a proposal which would keep the name of the Gold Award in perpetuity.

Until 2004, requirements for earning the award were:

- Earning the Girl Scout Gold Leadership Award, which requires girls to complete minimum of 80 hours of leadership work, as well as earn three Interest Projects and one Focus Book relevant to their project.
- Earning the Girl Scout Gold Career Award, which requires girls to complete 40 hours of career exploration.
- Earning the Girl Scout Gold 4Bs Challenge, which required girls to assess their community and its needs, and develop a vision for change. Up to 15 hours work on the 4Bs challenge could be counted toward the 65 hours for the service project.

==== Since 2004 ====
- Complete two Girl Scout Senior or Ambassador Journeys, or complete one Girl Scout Senior or Ambassador journey and have earned the Silver Award.
- Plan and implement an individual "Take Action" project that reaches beyond the Girl Scout organization and provides a sustainable, lasting benefit to the girl's larger community.

Once these steps have been met, girls use their vision for change for a service project, which requires a minimum of 80 hours of work in planning and actually completing the project. All of these hours must be completed by the Awardee, and though it is encouraged that the girl use troop members and others from the community to help her, their time spent does not count towards her 80-hour requirement. Plans must be developed with the aid of an advisor, then a project proposal must be submitted and approved by the girl's local council before starting the project, and a final report submitted and approved after the project's completion.

== Insignia ==
The Gold Award emblem is presented as a pin resembling an eight-pointed gold star with rays radiating from a central, polished trefoil.

== Benefits ==
Recipients of the Gold Award who enlist in the U.S. Armed Forces may receive advanced rank in recognition of their achievements. Some universities and colleges offer scholarships to Gold Award recipients. Yearly, GSUSA selects ten girls to be National Young Women of Distinction based on their Gold Award projects.

== Notable recipients ==
- Melissa Bachman – is an American hunter, producer, and host of hunting television episodes of the cable television program Winchester Deadly Passion on the Sportsman Channel, Pursuit Channel, and Wild TV.
- Betsy Boze – is an American academic and university administrator. With 25 years administrative experience at public universities, she was the ninth president of The College of The Bahamas. She has served as a professor of marketing, department chair, dean, and the CEO of Kent State University at Stark. She is a senior fellow at the American Association of State Colleges and Universities (AASCU) researching alternative revenue streams for public colleges and universities.
- Tammy Duckworth – is an American politician and retired Army National Guard lieutenant colonel serving as the junior United States senator from Illinois since 2017. Duckworth was the first Thai American woman elected to Congress, the first person born in Thailand elected to Congress, the first woman with a disability elected to Congress, the first female double amputee in the Senate, and the first senator to give birth while in office.
- Jan Hopkins – was the president of the Economic Club of New York from 2008 to 2015. She was the anchor of the daily CNN Financial News show Street Sweep from the New York Stock Exchange. Hopkins runs her own strategic communications and marketing company.
- Kendra Horn – is a former U.S. representative for Oklahoma's 5th congressional district.
- Hosanna Kabakoro – was an editor of Mai Life Style, the South Pacific's first style and fashion magazine. Kabakoro also served on the board of Vision Fiji, and was a spokesperson for the Fiji Water Foundation.
- Cassandra Levesque – is a member of the New Hampshire House of Representatives and activist against child marriage.
- Brianne Nadeau – is a Democratic politician in Washington, D.C., and a member of the Council of the District of Columbia representing Ward 1 since 2015. She defeated long-time incumbent Jim Graham in the Democratic Party primary and won the general election with 75% of the vote in 2014. She is the first woman to represent Ward 1 on the council and the first D.C. Councilmember to give birth while serving in office.
- Nina Vasan – is an American psychiatrist and author of the Amazon best-seller Do Good Well: Your Guide to Leadership, Action and Innovation. She is a resident physician in psychiatry at Stanford Hospital and Clinics and in the MBA program at Stanford Graduate School of Business. She resides in the San Francisco Bay Area and has advised companies and startups including McKinsey & Co and Lyra Health.
- Ginnie Sebastian Storage – is an American clubwoman and administrator who serves as the 47th President General of the Daughters of the American Revolution.

== Highest awards in other programs ==
The Gold Award is often compared to the Eagle Scout in Scouts BSA program of the Boy Scouts of America and General Billy Mitchell Award in Cadet Programs of the Civil Air Patrol.

== See also ==
- Silver Award (Girl Scouts of the USA)
- Bronze Award (Girl Scouts of the USA)
- List of Scouts
- List of awards for volunteerism and community service
