= Destination =

Destination may refer to:

== Music ==
- Destination (group), a disco studio group from New York
- Destination (Eloy album), 1992
- Destination (FictionJunction Yuuka album), 2005
- Destination (Ronan Keating album), 2002
- Destination (EP), by SS501, 2010
- The Destination, an EP by Vonthongchai Intarawat, 2008
- Destination, an album by Akina Nakamori, 2006
- "Destination", a song by The Church from Starfish
- "Destination", a song by Imagine Dragons from ITunes Session

== Other uses ==
- Destination (game), a board game
- Destination (magazine), a monthly lifestyle magazine published in Saudi Arabia
- Destination Films, a division of Sony Pictures
- Tourist destination, a place commercially dedicated to tourism
- Girl Scout Destinations, events for individual Girl Scouts, hosted by Girl Scouts of the USA

== See also ==
- Destiny (disambiguation)
