= Jan Hopkins =

- Employer: []

Jan Hopkins was the President of the Economic Club of New York from 2008–2015. She was the anchor of the daily CNN Financial News show "Street Sweep" from the New York Stock Exchange. Hopkins now runs her own strategic communications and marketing company.

While a member of the Girl Scouts of the USA, she earned the Curved Bar, a Girl Scout Gold Award predecessor. After graduating from Hiram College, Hopkins went to Prague with the American Friends Service Committee. While she was there, Soviet tanks rolled in, ending the "Prague Spring". She pursued a master's degree in American Studies and Communication at Case Western Reserve University. She began her 30-year career in journalism during that time, working as an intern on a late-night interview talk show. As her career in radio and television continued, she managed to complete a one-year fellowship at Columbia Business School and focused on business journalism.

She worked for WKBN, WLWT, CBS, ABC and CNN before joining Citibank as managing director of client communications. Hopkins left Citigroup Private Bank in 2005 to open her own firm, the Jan Hopkins Group, in New York. It is a strategic communications and marketing company specializing in deepening relationships with high-net-worth clients. The company also provides media coaching and video production services.
