= Girl Scout Destinations =

Girl Scout events

This article covers a Girl Scouts event: for vacation destinations see Vacation spot (disambiguation)

Girl Scout Destinations, formerly Wider Opportunities or Wider Ops, are events for individual Girl Scouts (ages 11 – 18) hosted by Girl Scouts of the USA (GSUSA) or individual Girl Scout councils. Most Destinations are held within the United States, though each year there are trips abroad, such as to allow participants to be part of the US delegation to another country's national jamboree, or a World Association of Girl Guides and Girl Scouts (WAGGGS) World Centre. They can range from two days to three weeks long. Most events are geared toward specified grade levels: Girl Scout Cadettes (6th - 8th grade), Girl Scout Seniors (9th and 10th grade), or Girl Scout Ambassadors (11th and 12th grade). Girls must go through an application process and sometimes an interview process before being chosen for a Destination.

Destinations might be outdoor oriented, such as kayaking in Alaska, or career oriented such as learning about working for NASA. They generally fall into one of six categories: international, outdoors, science, people, apprenticeships, or getaways. Getaways do not require a destinations application. These Destinations allow girls to meet other Girl Scouts from around the United States and form lasting friendships.

== Wider Opportunities ==
Wider Opportunities were open to any older girls (Cadettes and Seniors) registered with Girl Scouts of the USA, including those living abroad. In some cases, Scouts and Guides from other countries were also accepted. The focus of each trip varied widely, from general "sampler" trips where larger groups of girls tried an assortment of new activities, to smaller groups oriented on a specific skill. There were also trips to learn about the history of Girl Scouts and participate in country-wide discussions, and to learn various life skills while seeing new sights. Starting in 2000, GSUSA began collaborating with Outward Bound to offer small-group no-experience-required high adventure trips in addition to the trips run by GSUSA and Girl Scout councils across the country and abroad.

The number of participants allowed on a trip varied widely, often as low as 8-10, sometimes over one thousand, depending on the nature and location of the trip. In order to be considered for a trip, girls had to fill out an application, find references, and have an interview. Acceptance was competitive, with even the smallest trips frequently having several hundred applicants.

One item participants were told to bring, frequently, though not exclusively, seen in Scouting, is a SWAP. A SWAP, short for Something With A Pin, is a small object, typically with a pin or loop attached to the back, which displays something about the creator's home. SWAPS can also be defined as Special Whatchamacallits Affectionately Pinned Somewhere. The home address is also written on it, because SWAPs are meant to be traded with others as a way to remember people met while easily passing on contact information. Extra SWAPs can also be left at some locations, such as World Centers, for future travellers to find.
