= Wing Scout =

American aviator

- Owner: Girl Scouts of the USA
- Founded: 1941
- Defunct: 1980s

The Wing Scout Program was a popular older girl Girl Scout program begun in 1941 for girls "interested in flying and wanting to learn enough about aviation to serve their country."

Like the Mariner Scout program, the Wing Scout program began as a Senior Girl Scout Mobilist Project with limited expectations, but by July 1942 twenty-nine troop leaders from fifteen states met in Philadelphia, Pennsylvania, to take Wing Scout leadership training. These leaders returned to their councils and began setting up Wing Scout troops.

Once the United States entered into World War II, the Wing Scout program took on a new importance.

The first formal printed information on the Wing Scout program was a packet described in the publication Senior Girl Scouting in War Time. A 4-page pamphlet was produced in 1944, and a 16-page booklet was issued in 1945. A 20-page Wing Scout Manual was published in 1945. That same year the first of three Piper Cub training planes were presented to Girl Scouts by William T. Piper, President of Piper Aircraft (August 17, 1945).

== Girl Scouts Take Wing ==
Girl Scouting was already offering an Aviation badge in 1916, but it is unknown as to whether any Girl Scouts earned the badge during the time it was offered between 1916 and 1920. It was reintroduced in 1947 for both the Intermediate Girl Scout and Cadette Girl Scout program.

In the beginning, there was no official insignia for Wing Scouts. In 1955 that changed and a Girl Scout could be designated Wing Scout Analyst and earn her silver wings. Chevrons in the form of gold stitching on dark green felt, were earned at each level: Wing Scout Traveler, one chevron; Wing Scout Navigator, two chevron; Wing Scout Technician, three chevrons; and Wing Scout Pilot, a propeller above the chevrons. A Wing Scout Pilot had to earn her pilot's certification and/or serve as an Assistant Leader in a Wing Scout Troop.

== Wing Scouts in California ==
The San Diego Chapter 99s & Wing Scout Troop #489 in 1951 at the Del Mar, CA Airport

In 1959, Girl Scout Council in North San Mateo County was presented with an offer from United Airlines San Francisco Management Club President J. L. Burnside to start an aviation program for Senior Girl Scouts.

At that time, the council had been in search of a program that would challenge the interest of Senior Girl Scouts.

We felt this high caliber type program assistance merited more than our own local girls, so we invited girls from surrounding councils to join us. This afforded us the opportunity of working not only with the Central San Mateo County Council with whom were about to merge; but also San Carlos, Redwood City, San Francisco, and Alameda. ... When girls from Fremont, Livermore, Walnut Creek, Pinole, and Sacramento came – we felt very rewarded; and that our far reaching goals were justified and had been reached. The program received recognition Nationally, in the Leader Magazine. As a result, we received inquiries from many Councils, including one from a Council just outside of Washington D.C., concerning our procedure plans. —

One of the highlights of the Wing Scout program was the courtesy flight provide to Senior Girl Scouts using United Airlines' jets. For many of the girls, this was the first time they had flown in a plane.

The Wing Scout program was not for show, participating girls took it very seriously. As a result of their proficient training and ability, Senior Girl Scouts who had been in the program for three years were given the opportunity to take over the controls during flight in a small aircraft. The program in the Bay Area continued into the 1980s when it was discontinued after United Airlines experienced financial setbacks.

The San Diego area was also home to Wing Scout Troop #489, sponsored by The San Diego Chapter of the Ninety-Nines, Inc, International Organization of Women Pilots. Members of the San Diego 99s mentored the Scouts. A few were also flight instructors who would provide the scouts flight instruction.

== See also ==
- Air Explorers
