= Noorain Khan =

American Scouting executive

Noorain Khan is a nonprofit executive and attorney who currently serves as National President of the Girl Scouts of the USA. She is the first Muslim American to hold this position and has previously held senior roles at the Ford Foundation and the White House National Economic Council. She is also a Rhodes Scholar.

== Early life and education ==
Khan was raised in Grand Rapids, Michigan. She earned a Bachelor of Arts from Rice University. She went on to study Migration Studies at the University of Oxford as a Rhodes Scholar. She received her J.D. from Yale Law School.

== Career ==
After starting her legal career at Wachtell, Lipton, Rosen & Katz, Khan moved into public policy and philanthropy. She served as a senior policy advisor at the White House National Economic Council during the Biden administration. She also served as Director of the Office of the President at Ford Foundation. Khan was elected National President of the Girl Scouts of the USA in 2023, becoming the first Muslim woman to hold the position.

== Awards and recognition ==
- Rhodes Scholar (2006)
- Paul & Daisy Soros Fellowship for New Americans (2006)
- Young Women of Distinction Award, Girl Scouts of the USA (2002)
- 30 Under 30: Law & Policy, Forbes (2014)
- George Parkin Service Award

== Personal life ==
Khan is married to K. Sabeel Rahman.
