= Murray Atkins Walls =

American high school teacher and civil rights activist (1899–1993)

Murray Atkins Walls (1899–1993) was an American high school teacher and civil rights activist from Indianapolis who fought for the integration of Louisville public libraries after being denied access to research for a speaking engagement in Louisville, Kentucky.

== Background ==
Walls was born Murray B. Atkins in Indianapolis, Indiana, on December 22, 1899, to Dr. Calvin R. Atkins and Dora Atkins. She graduated from college in 1920 with a bachelor's degree from Butler University in Indianapolis where she was a member of the Alpha Kappa Alpha sorority. She also received a master's degree from Columbia University. Walls taught as a high school teacher in Indianapolis. She also served the Girl Scouts in Kentuckiana for over 20 years and held positions as camp committee member, council board member, council vice-president, volunteer trainer and integration activist. Later in her life she volunteered with Red Cross and supervised tenant selection for the Louisville Housing Commission.

== Career and activism ==
After completing her education, Walls moved to Louisville in 1935 after marrying a doctor named John H. Walls and began teaching high school. She was denied access to use the nearest library in Louisville to research and prepare for a speaking engagement. She was directed to the colored libraries; the western and eastern branches. After going through this incident, Walls began to campaign for the desegregation of the Louisville Free Public Libraries. She first began her activism for this desegregation in 1941 by participation in a sit-in. Instead of taking on the whole entire library system, Walls had to "fight each one separately". Louisville libraries began to integrate in 1948.

Walls also became a member of the Girl Scouts in 1940 and was monumental in the creation of the first African American Girl Scouts troop. She served on the committee for Negro Scouting and created the first camp for black Girl Scouts in the Beecher Terrace Housing Complex. The creation of this camp allowed for more black girls to attain membership for Girl Scouts. Walls became the first African American member for the Girl Scouts board of directors in 1945 and pioneered for the desegregation for a shared camp session for white and black girls. She was successful in the established for an integrated camp Shantituck, which allowed both white and black girls. In 1962, She received the Girl Scouts highest award and Thanks Badge to honor her for her contributions and activism.

Walls also became one of the first African American Presidents of The Nation Association for the Advancement of Colored People (NAACP) in Louisville.

She was appointed to Louisville mayor Bruce Hoblitzell's Civic-Religious Committee where she fought for desegregation in school and classrooms. During the 1930s she also worked as a federal housing surveyor and became an advocate of public housing for African Americans and was later appointed to the Louisville Human Relation Commission in 1964.

== Personal life and death ==
Walls married Dr. John H. Walls in 1935 and they both lived in Louisville. Walls died on September 16, 1993, in Louisville and was buried in Crown Hill Cemetery in Indianapolis. She was an important civil rights leader in Kentucky who worked for several decades to help integrate Louisville Girl Scouts, public libraries and schools. She was recognized for her activism in the Commonwealth of Kentucky with a historical plaque on the Girl Scouts of Kentuckiana property.
