= Bronze Award (Girl Scouts of the USA) =

Bronze Award

The Bronze Award is the third highest award in Girl Scouts of the USA. It was introduced by GSUSA in 2001, and can only be earned by Girl Scouts at the Junior level.

== Prerequisites ==
Girls must be in 4th or 5th grade (or equivalent), be a registered Girl Scout Junior, and have completed a Junior Journey before they can begin work on a Bronze Award project.

== Bronze Award steps ==
1. Go on a Girl Scout Junior Journey.
2. Build your Girl Scout Junior team.
3. Explore your community.
4. Choose your Girl Scout Bronze Award project.
5. Make a plan.
6. Put your plan in motion.
7. Spread the word.

=== Junior Journey ===
There are currently seven Junior Journey programs to choose from. All badges in the Journey must be earned for the Journey to be complete.

- Agent of Change. It's Your World, Change It! (three badges, sold as a complete set)
  - Power of One Award
  - Power of Team Award
  - Power of Community Award
- Get Moving! It's Your Planet, Love It! (three badges, sold as a complete set)
  - Energize Award
  - Investigate Award
  - Innovate Award
- aMUSE! It's Your Story, Tell It! (three badges, sold as a complete set)
  - Reach Out! Award
  - Speak Out! Award
  - Try Out! Award
- Think Like a Citizen Scientist (two badges, sold separately)
  - Junior Think Like a Citizen Scientist Award
  - Junior Take Action Award
- Think Like a Programmer (two badges, sold separately)
  - Junior Think Like a Programmer Award
  - Junior Take Action Award
- Think Like an Engineer (two badges, sold separately)
  - Junior Think Like an Engineer Award
  - Junior Take Action Award
- Outdoor Journey (four badges, sold separately)
  - Junior Camper
  - Animal Habitats
  - Eco Camper
  - Junior Take Action Award

== Bronze Award Project ==
The Bronze Award Project is a team effort by a group of Juniors, usually from a single troop. The project's objective must be to benefit the local community and/or benefit Girl Scouting as a whole in some way. Each scout is expected to contribute 20 hours to the project. The project is to be girl-led, but, unlike the Silver and Gold Awards, adults may be on-hand to assist and guide.

== Approval ==
The approval process varies by council. Before beginning work on a Take Action Project or a Bronze Project, it is important to check with the local council.

== See also ==
- Girl Scouts of the USA
- Gold Award (Girl Scouts of the USA)
- Silver Award (Girl Scouts of the USA)
