= Silver Award (Girl Scouts of the USA) =

Silver Award

The Silver Award is the second highest award of the Girl Scouts of the USA, and one of the highest awards that a Girl Scout Cadette can earn.

== History ==
The Silver Award was first introduced in 1980 at the National Program Conferences, launching alongside the updated Gold Award. Requirements for the Silver Award, the Gold Award, and the new Cadette and Senior badges were first found in the book "You Make the Difference: Handbook for Cadette and Senior Girl Scouts," published in June 1980.

== Prerequisites ==
A girl must be in 6th, 7th or 8th grade (or equivalent), be a registered Girl Scout Cadette, and have completed a Cadette Journey, a Cadette Leadership Award, or a Bronze Award before she can begin work on a Silver Award project.

=== Cadette Journey ===
There are currently seven Cadette Journey programs to choose from. All badges in the Journey must be earned for the Journey to be complete. Cadette Journeys are to be phased out on October 1, 2026 and will be replaced with new Leadership Awards.

Cadette Journeys
| Name of Journey | Badges | Notes |
|---|---|---|
| Cadette Amaze Journey | Interact; Diplomat; Peacemaker | Badges sold as a set |
| Cadette Breathe Journey | Aware; Alert; Affirm | Badges sold as a set |
| Cadette MEdia Journey | Monitor; Influence; Cultivate | Badges sold as a set |
| Cadette Outdoor Journey | Night Owl; Trailblazing; Primitive Camper; Cadette Take Action | Badges sold separately |
| Cadette Think Like an Engineer Journey | Cadette Think Like an Engineer Journey Award; Cadette Take Action | Badges sold separately |
| Cadette Think Like a Programmer Journey | Cadette Think Like a Programmer Journey Award; Cadette Take Action | Badges sold separately |
| Cadette Think Like a Political Scientist Journey Award | Cadette Think Like a Political Scientist Journey Award; Cadette Take Action | Badges sold separately |

== Silver Award Steps ==
1. Identify an issue you care about.
2. Build your Girl Scout Silver Award team or decide to go solo.
3. Explore your community.
4. Pick your Silver Award project.
5. Develop your project.
6. Make a plan and put it into motion.
7. Reflect, share your story, and celebrate.

== Silver Award Project ==
The Silver Award Project can be done as an individual or as a small group (2-4). Each Girl Scout is expected to contribute 50 hours to the project. The project is to be girl-led, but adults can advise and assist when necessary. Although the general guidelines have been established by GSUSA, it is important to check with the local Council on exact procedure.

== Approval ==
The approval process varies by council. Before beginning work on a Take Action Project or a Silver Project, it is important to check with the local council.

== See also ==
- Gold Award (Girl Scouts of the USA)
- Bronze Award (Girl Scouts of the USA)
- Silver Award Example
