= Studio 2B =

The official Studio 2B logo.

Studio 2B was a level of Girl Scouting in the Girl Scouts of the USA and consisted of girls between the ages of 11 through 17. GSUSA created the program to attract older girls into the scouting program and replace Cadette and Senior Girl Scouting.

== History ==
Studio 2B was created as a response to a lack of interest in Girl Scouting in the United States of America. A study named Ten Emerging Truths: New Directions for Girls 11-17 was conducted by the Girl Scout Research Institute (GSRI) and targeted teenaged girls both in and outside of the GSUSA program, volunteers in the program, and the families of the girls. The study found that girls in the 11 through 17 age group wanted to discuss topics that were of interest to them, chose their own activities to participate in, create and be a part of their own program, and be advised by adults they can relate to. Similar studies by the GSRI concluded that nearly a quarter of the girls surveyed had less than three adults they could go to for help. The Girl Scouts of the USA developed Studio 2B in October 2002 as a solution to the lack of adult mentors for the young women. The Studio 2B system was totally phased out in 2011.

== Organization ==
Studio 2B is the largest structural change to GSUSA since the early 1960s. It is based on a concept called the Four B's standing for Become, Belong, Believe, and Build. Activities are organized using a By Girls, For Girls approach. This encourages girls to take charge of the program of activities and make as many of the decisions and arrangements themselves as possible. In supplementing the book of Interest Project Patches, which are similar to Boy Scout merit badges, Studio 2B has Focus Books full of activities that the girls can choose from to earn a charm for their bracelet, or a small slide for their uniform. Like all other Girl Scouts, Studio 2B Scouts pay membership dues and live by the Girl Scout Law and Promise.

Studio 2B is designed to cater to individual needs and give girls a positive place to express themselves with help from "mentors" or "advisers", who are generally 18 to 29 years of age. Meetings are optional, and girls can scout independently if they do not join a troop.

Studio 2B differs from many other Scouting programs because of the absence of the patrol system of organization. Instead, girls are encouraged to form small temporary groups around a common interest, within their Studio 2B troop.

== Focus Books ==
Focus Books were the Studio 2B equivalent to the Girl Scout Senior and Cadette Interest Project Book. They contained similar activities needed to complete an Interest Project. The Scout could earn a charm for the Studio 2B charm bracelet in lieu of a badge. Girls earned awards by meeting goals tailored to their own interests and abilities.

== Silver Award ==
The Silver Award is the second highest award of the Girl Scouts of the USA. Studio 2B participants between sixth and ninth grades, or aged 11 through 14, could work on the award, but it could only be completed by girls in the seventh through ninth grades, or aged 12 through 14. After earning a series of awards to build her skills, a girl could embark on a project to benefit her community. The prerequisites were changed when the Studio 2B system was phased out in 2011.

== Gold Award ==
The Gold Award is the highest award of the Girl Scouts of the USA. Studio 2B participants could work on the Gold Award once they were 15 years old or joined tenth grade. The prerequisites were changed when the Studio 2B system was phased out in 2011.
