= Girl Scouts of the USA =

Non-profit youth organization for American girls

Girl Scouts of the United States of America
- The current Girl Scouts logo, introduced in 2009. (Note: An earlier version of this logo, designed by Saul Bass, was introduced 31 years prior.)
- Headquarters: New York City, U.S.
- Country: United States
- Coordinates: 40°45′3″N 73°59′0″W
- Founded: March 12, 1912; 114 years ago
- Founder: Juliette Gordon Low
- Membership: 1 million+ girl members (2023) and 750,000 adults (2020)
- CEO: Bonnie Barczykowski
- Affiliation: World Association of Girl Guides and Girl Scouts
- Website girlscouts.org

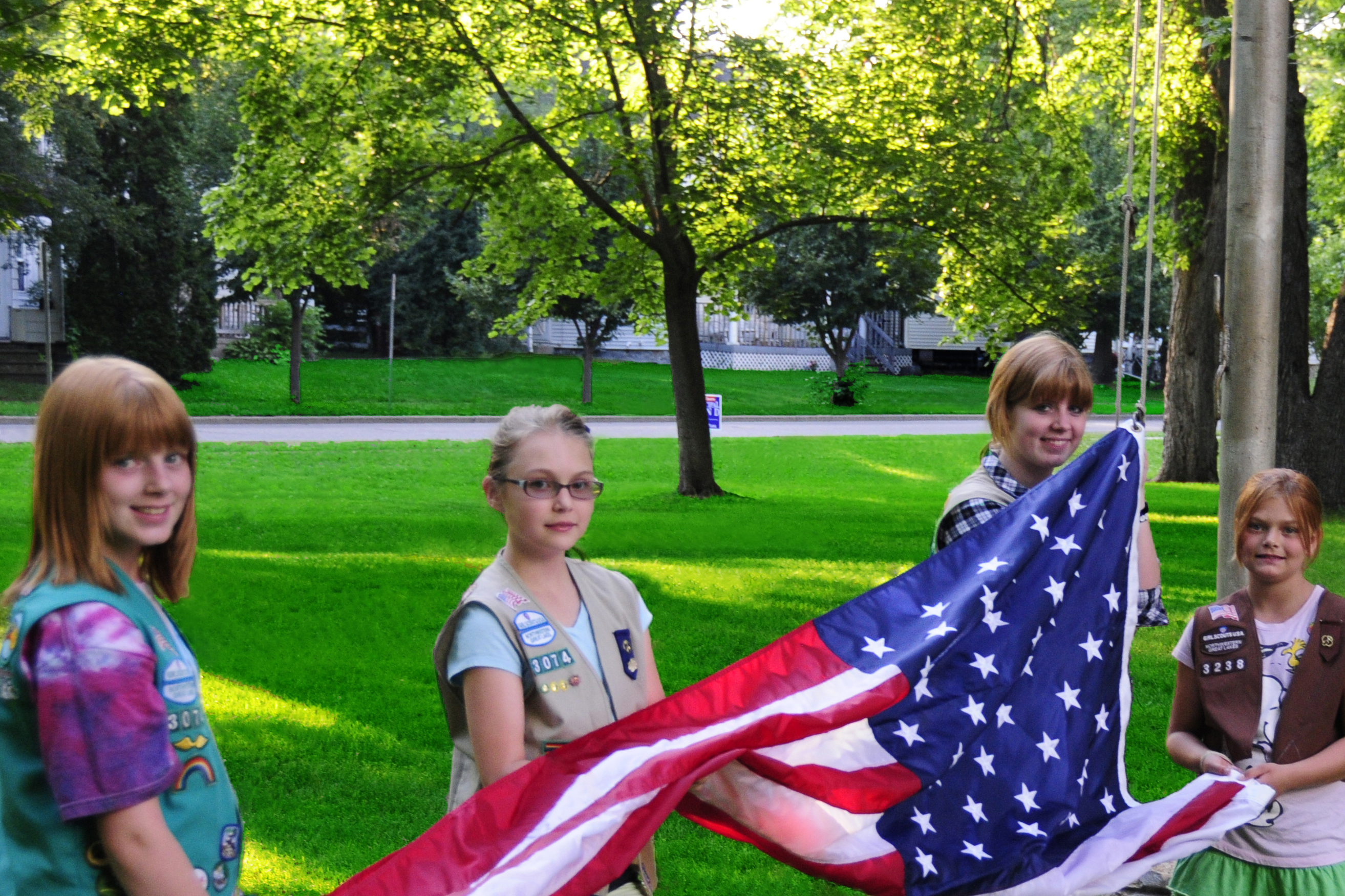
Girl Scouts raising the flag at a Municipal Band concert in Eau Claire, Wisconsin

Girl Scouts of the United States of America (GSUSA), commonly referred to as Girl Scouts, is a youth organization for girls in the United States and American girls living abroad. It was founded by Juliette Gordon Low in 1912, a year after she had met Robert Baden-Powell, the founder of Scouting America (formerly Boy Scouts).

The stated mission of Girl Scouts is to "build girls of courage, confidence, and character, who make the world a better place" through activities involving camping, community service, and practical skills such as first aid. Members can earn badges by completing certain tasks and mastering skills. More senior members may be eligible for awards, such as the Bronze, Silver, and Gold Awards. Membership is organized according to grade level, with activities designed for each level. The organization is a member of the World Association of Girl Guides and Girl Scouts (WAGGGS).

== History ==
=== Girl Guides of America ===
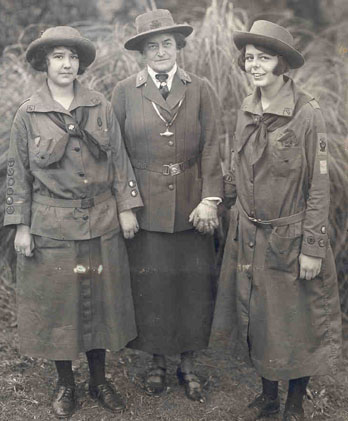
Juliette Gordon Low (center), with two Girl Scouts.

Girl Scouting in the United States began on March 12, 1912, when founder Juliette Gordon Low organized the first Girl Guide troop meeting in Savannah, Georgia. It has since grown to near 3.7 million members. From its inception, Girl Scouts has been an all-girls organization, run by and for girls.

Low was the granddaughter of Juliette Magill Kinzie and John Harris Kinzie, and her maternal grandparents were two of the earliest settlers of Chicago. Juliette Kinzie wrote about her experiences in the Northwest Territory (now the state of Wisconsin) in her book Wau-Bun: The Early Day. Low incorporated some of her grandmother's experiences on the frontier into the traditions of Girl Scouts.

In late 1912, Low sought various mergers with similar organizations, including Camp Fire Girls and the Des Moines-based Girl Scouts of America, but was unsuccessful in any merging.

=== Girl Scouts of the United States ===
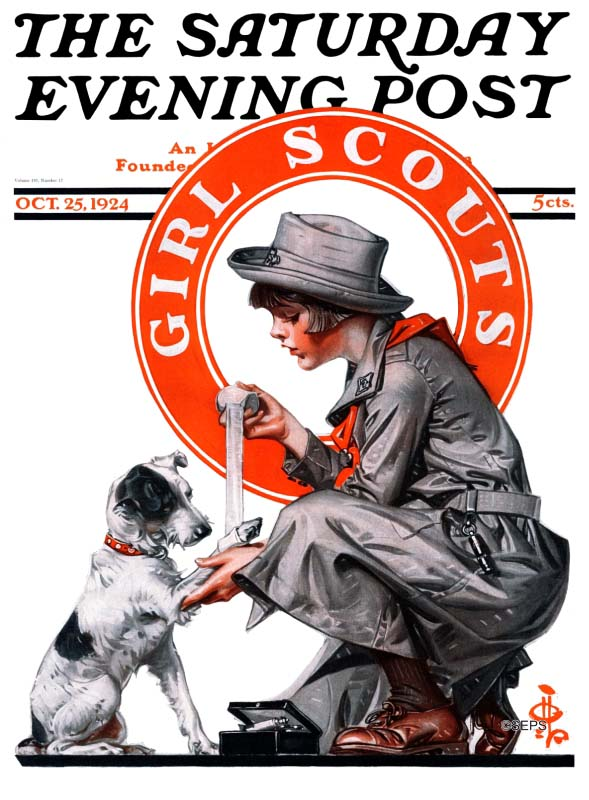
Cover story from The Saturday Evening Post on Girl Scouts (Oct 25, 1924)

In 1913, the organization was renamed to Girl Scouts of the United States. Its headquarters was subsequently moved to Washington, D.C.

In 1915, the organization was incorporated, and its headquarters was moved to New York City. The organization was renamed for the final time to Girl Scouts of the United States of America in 1947. The organization received a congressional charter on March 16, 1950.

By 1920, the organization reached nearly 70,000 members. In 1930, that number had expanded to over 200,000 members. As of 2013, there were over 3.2 million Girl Scouts: 2.3 million youth members and 890,000 adult members. More than 50 million American women have participated in Girl Scouts throughout its history.

In 1923, Girl Scouts were organized into patrols, troops, local councils, and a National Council. Initially, troops had a high degree of independence, but over time, councils were formed between troops. Today there are 111 councils across the United States and Girl Scouts Overseas following a cycle of mergers in 2006.

The Juliette Gordon Low Historic District in Savannah, Georgia, became the national Girl Scout program center in 1956. Upon Low's death in 1927, she willed her carriage house, at 330 Drayton Street, which eventually became The Girl Scout First Headquarters, to the local Savannah Girl Scouts for continued use.

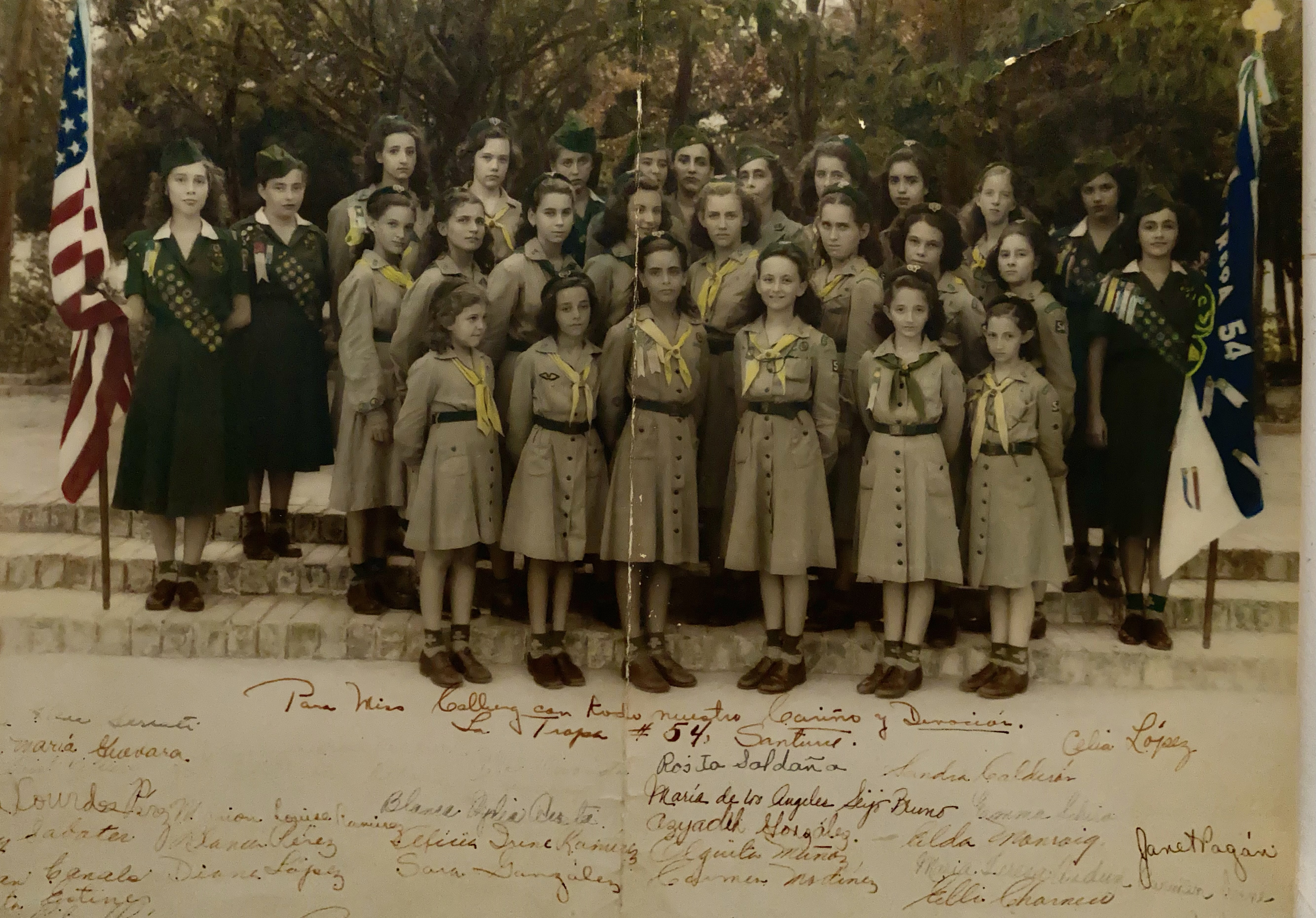
San Juan, Puerto Rico Girl Scouts Troop No. 54, (Year 1945)

=== Desegregation ===
Most Girl Scout units were originally segregated by race according to state and local laws and customs. The first troop for African American girls was founded in 1917; the first American Indian troop was formed in New York State in 1921; and the first troop for Mexican Americans was formed in Houston, Texas, in 1922. In 1933, Josephine Groves Holloway founded unofficial African American troops in Tennessee. She also fully desegregated the Cumberland Valley council in 1962. The first official African American troop in the South was founded in 1932 in Richmond, Virginia. It was created by Maggie Lena Walker and Lena B. Watson, but was led by Lavinia Banks, a teacher from Armstrong High School. It first met in Hartshorn Hall at Virginia Union University.

By the 1950s, GSUSA had begun significant national efforts to desegregate the camps and maintain racial balance. One of the first desegregations, accomplished by Murray Atkins Walls in 1956, was at Camp Shattuck in Kentucky. In 1969, a Girl Scout initiative called Action 70 was created that aimed to eliminate prejudice. Gloria D. Scott, an African American, was elected national president of GSUSA in 1975.

Amy Erdman Farrell, in her 2025 book Intrepid Girls: The Complicated History of the Girl Scouts of the USA, describes the processes by which Girl Scouts maintained and practiced segregation in the first half of the 20th century and into the 1960s. These included the lone troop rule, stating that individual troops could only be initiated by "members of the white race" and the practice of local rule, which meant that even after the lone troop practice was eliminated, local troops and regional councils could allow segregation to continue.

=== Wing Scouts ===
The Wing Scouts was a Senior Girl Scout program for girls interested in aviation. It was started in 1941 and ended in the 1970s. In July 1942, 29 troop leaders from 15 states met in Philadelphia for Wing Scout leadership training. They returned to their councils and began the creation of Wing Scout troops. In 1959, the council in San Mateo County, California was presented with an offer from United Airlines to start an aviation program for Senior Girl Scouts. A highlight of the Wing Scout program was a courtesy flight provided to Senior Girl Scouts using United Airlines aircraft. For many of the girls, the flight was their first time being in an airplane. The program was discontinued after United Airlines experienced financial issues in the 1970s.

== Age levels ==
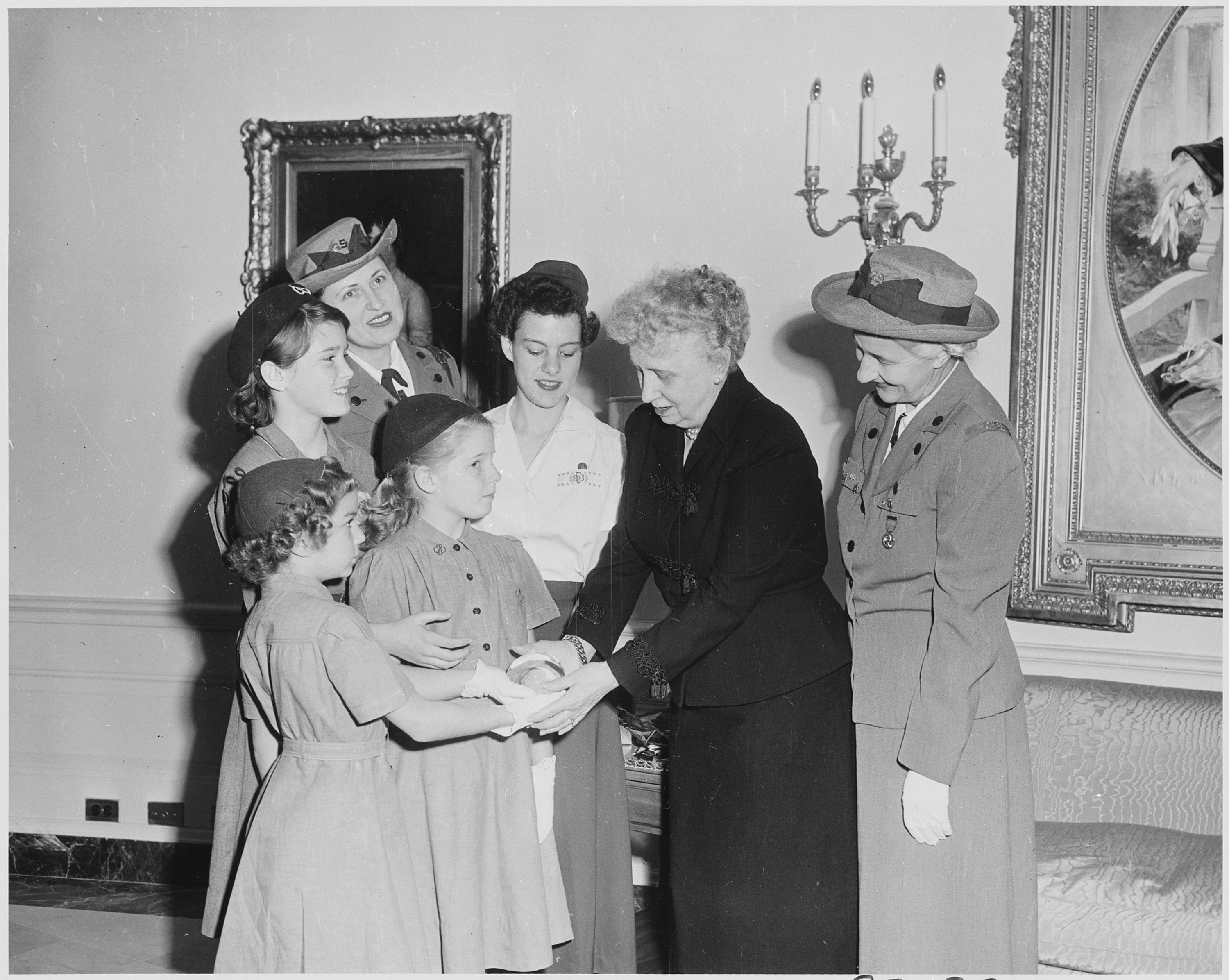
Bess Truman with Girl Scouts and their leaders

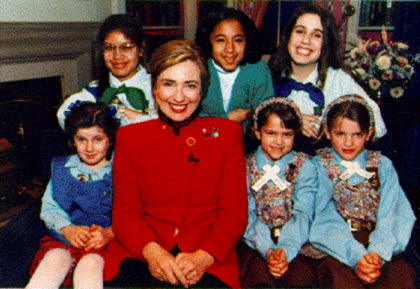
Hillary Clinton posing with Girl Scouts

In 1938, the age divisions consisted of Brownies (ages 7 through 9), Intermediates (ages 10 through 13), and Seniors (ages 14 through 18).

In 1965, the age divisions were changed to include Brownies (ages 7 and 8, or 2nd and 3rd grade), Juniors (ages 9 through 11, or 4th through 6th grade), Cadettes (ages 11 through 14, or 7th through 9th grade), and Seniors (ages 14 through 18, or 10th through 12th grade).

The Daisy program for kindergarten-age girls was started in 1984. The Daisy program succeeded a 1976 pilot program known as Pixies.

In 2003, the Studio 2B program was introduced for Cadettes and Seniors. Under the Studio 2B programs, girls were able to work on traditional badges as well as Studio 2B activities, and the Silver Award and Gold Award requirements were altered to require both. Studio 2B activities differed from badges in that each booklet focused on a topic such as environmentalism or self-confidence rather than being skill-based like a badge.

On October 1, 2008, all levels were renamed to begin with "Girl Scout" (e.g., Girl Scout Brownies instead of Brownie Girl Scouts). Additionally, levels were changed to an exclusively grade-based system, A new level, Girl Scout Ambassadors, was created for girls in grades 11 and 12. Sixth grade girls were reclassified from Junior level to Cadette level in order to conform with the broad reclassification of 6th grade as a middle school grade. The new levels were tested in approximately six councils during the spring of 2008 and were instituted nationally after October 1, 2008.

As of 2024, Girl Scouts can begin in kindergarten and join all the way through 12th grade. The age divisions are Daisies (kindergarten and 1st grade), Brownies (2nd and 3rd grade), Juniors (4th and 5th grade), Cadettes (6th through 8th grade), Seniors (9th and 10th grade), and Ambassadors (11th and 12th grade).

Although troop membership is the most common way to participate in Girl Scouting, girls who do not have a local troop, or those who are unable or unwilling to participate in their local troop, can still sign up as individual Girl Scouts. Individual Girl Scouts were known in the early years of Girl Scouting as Lone Scouts and later as Juliettes; they attend activities independently and work individually on badges and awards. In 2015–2016, the term Juliette was phased out at the national level, in favor of the term Independent Girl Scouts, although some councils still use the term Juliette.

=== Mariner Scouts ===
The 20th National Council of GSUSA launched the Mariner Girl Scout program in October 1934. Similar to the Boy Scouts of America's Sea Scouting, the program was designed for older Girl Scouts interested in outdoor water-based activities. By the end of 1934, 12 Mariner ships were registered and the first two handbooks, launching a Girl Scout Mariner Ship and Charting the Course of a Girl Scout Mariner Ship, were published. The Mariner Girl Scout program remains active but in a smaller form; most girls have instead joined Sea Scouting, which has been coed since 1971.

=== Special programs ===
Programs are available for girls in specific circumstances that may make it difficult for them to participate in standard programs. The Girl Scouts "Beyond Bars program" helps daughters of incarcerated mothers connect with their mothers and helps mothers participate in Girl Scout activities. Another program, Girl Scouting in Detention Centers, allows girls who are themselves in detention centers to participate in Scouting. Other initiatives try to help girls in rural areas or in public housing. There are also programs for American girls living overseas, and girls whose families are experiencing homelessness or are living in temporary housing.

== Organizational structure ==
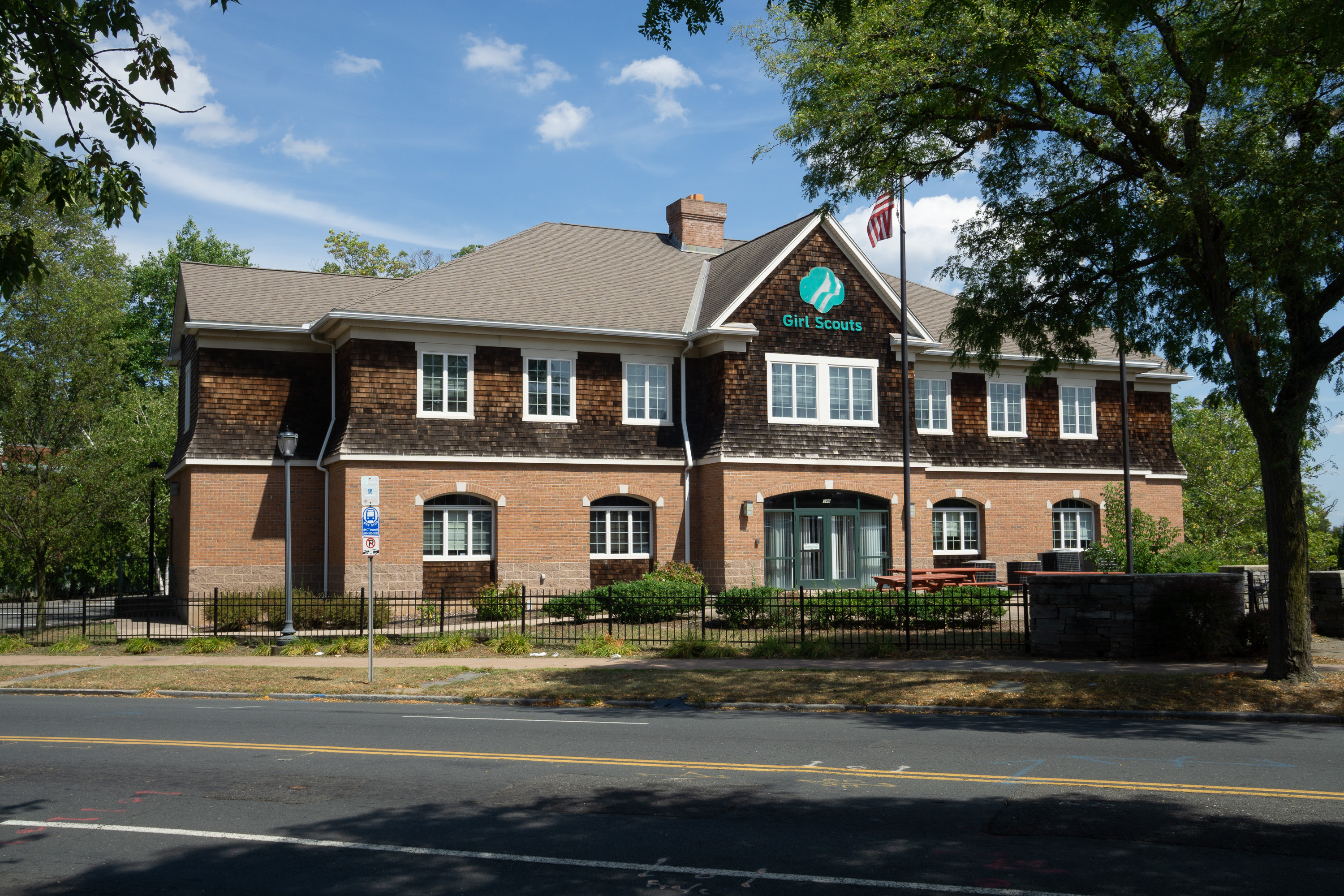
Girl Scouts of Connecticut, in Hartford

The national organization is headquartered in New York City. It is headed by a chief executive officer and a 30-member board of directors. Bonnie Barczykowski currently serves as the chief executive officer and was officially appointed in February 2023. The president of the board of directors is Noorain Khan.

Councils operate below the national leadership; they usually cover a large portion of a state or geographic region. Some councils own and run camps for the troops within their area of responsibility. Councils are usually subdivided into areas, variously known as neighborhoods, service units, or associations. These are program delivery areas that consist of troops at all age levels in a smaller area, such as a town.

The basic unit is the troop which may or may not be sponsored. In contrast to Boy Scout troop-chartered organizations, Girl Scout troop sponsors do not own the troop. Troops range in size from as small as 5 to as large as 30 or more girls and may be divided into several patrols of 8 or fewer girls.

=== Realignment ===
In 2004, Girl Scouts of the USA hired a consultant "to help Girl Scouts develop a strategy to ensure our future success and growth." Six "gap teams" looked at ways Girl Scouts could improve its structure in order to ensure the future growth and success of the organization. This followed declines in both membership and revenue, as well as challenges in subsidizing programs in urban areas. The governance gap team found that consolidation decreased confusion and provided economies of scale and recommended an optimal council size of approximately 10,000 girls. This left 312 regional Girl Scout councils, which administrate 236,000 local troops and other groups. In 2004, the board of directors consolidated the 312 councils into 109 councils.

In response to the consolidation, the Manitou Girl Scout council in Wisconsin sued GSUSA in the district court, alleging a breach of the Girl Scout charter. The suit was summarily dismissed with prejudice. The Seventh U.S. Circuit of Appeals overturned the decision, stating that a Girl Scout council agreement "was no different than a Dunkin' Donuts franchise." The decision of the appeals court maintained the status of the Manitou council. As a result, there are 112 Girl Scout councils in the United States.

== Insignia ==
=== Promise, Law, Motto, and Slogan ===
Promise

The Girl Scout Promise can be communicated in English, Spanish, or in American Sign Language, carrying the same meaning:

On my honor, I will try:
To serve God* and my country,
To help people at all times,
And to live by the Girl Scout Law

* Members may substitute for the word God
in accordance with their own spiritual beliefs.

The Promise is often recited at Girl Scout troop meetings while holding up the three middle fingers of the right hand, forming the Girl Scout sign. Girl Scout policy states that the organization does not endorse or promote any particular philosophy or religious belief. The movement is nonsectarian and secular. In this context, the word "God" may be interpreted by each Girl Scout depending on her individual spiritual beliefs, and Girl Scouts are free to substitute the word consistent with their beliefs, such as "Creator", "my faith", "Allah", etc. Many Girl Scouts use the word "Community" or "Good" as a substitution.

Law

The current version of the Girl Scout Law reads as follows:

I will do my best to be
honest and fair,
friendly and helpful,
considerate and caring,
courageous and strong, and
responsible for what I say and do,
and to
respect myself and others,
respect authority,
use resources wisely,
make the world a better place, and
be a sister to every Girl Scout.

The Girl Scout Law has been changed several times since 1912. The original Girl Scout Law written by Juliette Gordon Low was:

A Girl Scout's honor is to be trusted
A Girl Scout is loyal
A Girl Scout's duty is to be useful and to help others
A Girl Scout is a friend to all, and a sister to every other Girl Scout no matter to what social class she may belong
A Girl Scout is courteous
A Girl Scout keeps herself pure
A Girl Scout is a friend to animals
A Girl Scout obeys orders
A Girl Scout is cheerful
A Girl Scout is thrifty

Motto

Be prepared.

Slogan

Do a good turn daily.

=== Girl Scout uniforms ===
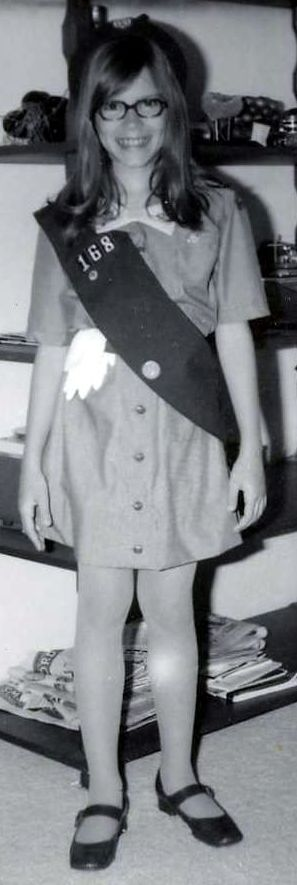
Girl Scout in uniform, 1973

Girl Scout uniforms vary by age cohort – Daisies wear blue, Brownies wear brown, Juniors wear green, and Cadettes, Seniors, and Ambassadors wear tan. Since 2008, Girl Scouts at each level have one required element (tunic, sash or vest) for the display of official pins and awards which will be required when girls participate in ceremonies or officially represent the Girl Scout Movement.

For girls ages 5 to 14, the unifying look includes wearing a choice of a tunic, vest, sash for displaying official pins and awards, combined with their own solid white shirts and khaki pants or skirts. Girl Scouts in high school can also wear a scarf that unites their look with the sisterhood of Girl Scouts around the world. For adult members the unifying look of the uniform is a Girl Scout official scarf or tie for men, worn with the official membership pins, combined with their own navy-blue business attire. Girl Scouts at the Daisy and Brownie levels will continue to have a full uniform ensemble available.

The adult uniform also changed, with registered women and men wearing navy blue business attire, again from their regular wardrobes. Also available for women are official sweaters and an insignia scarf, while men have the option of an official tie.

For all levels, earned awards go on the front of the vest or sash following official placements. Fun patches can be displayed on the back of a vest or sash. Girl Scout Daisies can choose a blue vest or a smock with a full uniform or white shirt and khaki pants and skirt. They have their own Daisy pin and a choice of accessories. Girl Scout Brownies can choose a traditional brown vest or sash to be worn with the historic Brownie pin and other uniform pieces or white shirt and khaki pants or skirts. Girl Scout Juniors wear their official vest or sash to display insignia including awards, coupled with a white shirt and khaki pants or skirt. Girl Scout Cadettes, Seniors, and Ambassadors can choose a khaki sash or vest to go with khaki pants or skirt and a white shirt.

=== Logos ===
Designed by Juliette Gordon Low, the sole emblem of the Girl Scouts of the USA from 1912 until 1978

The emblem designed by Juliette Gordon Low was the only emblem used for Girl Scout pins through 1980. At the 1978 GSUSA National Convention, the use of two logos was voted on, allowing Girl Scouts to pick which they wanted to wear as their Girl Scout pin (for Girl Scout Juniors and up).

The current Girl Scouts of the USA logo is a rejuvenation of the original logo based on Saul Bass' 1978 design, Bass being a graphic designer known for his motion picture title sequences and design of various other well-known logos. In 2010, the hair and facial styles were updated by Jennifer Kinnon and Bobby C. Martin Jr. of The Original Champions of Design.

== Activities and programs ==
One of the original and continuing attractions of Girl Scouts is that girls become proficient campers and participate in many outdoor activities such as canoeing or backpacking with their troops. Troops do service projects such as carrying out flag ceremonies, collecting food for food drives, visiting nursing homes, and Christmas caroling or other community services. Troops may also plan and take extended trips within the United States or even to another country. Troops may organize cultural or learning events such as first-aid training or attending live theater. The Girl Scout activity most familiar to the general public may be the annual sale of Girl Scout Cookies, which started in 1917 as a money-earning opportunity for councils and troops.

=== Girl Scouts and STEM ===
Girl Scouts has incorporated STEM-related programs and badges to encourage more interest in Scouts in STEM fields. From 2005 to 2007, more than 8.6 million STEM-related badges were earned. The first STEM-related Girl Scout badges, though, can be traced back to the 1913 Electrician and Flyer Badges. The first computer-related badges appeared in the 1980s. In 2001, The Girl Scout Research Institute, published a 36-page report about the need for more encouragement to get girls into the field of technology. An even larger push for STEM programs came after a 2012 study by the Girl Scout Research Institute reported that 74% of teenage girls were interested in courses in STEM subjects while only 25% of STEM industry jobs were held by women. Recent endeavors to encourage interest in STEM fields amongst Girl Scouts includes partnerships with companies like NASA, AT&T, and Lockheed Martin. NASA specifically paired Girl Scouts with the SETI Institute to create a 5-year space education program called "Reaching for the Stars: NASA Science for Girl Scouts." The most recent push to help Girl Scouts imagine a future in STEM was the Girl Scout's appearance at the International Consumer Electronics Show in January 2016 to show off Digital Cookie 2.0, a website made in partnership with Dell and Visa, that helps Girl Scouts manage their cookie business online.

There are four Girl Scout FIRST Robotics Competition teams: Space Cookies Team 1868, Lady Cans Team 2881, Gadget Girls Team 4816, and Tin Mints Team 4574. The Space Cookies are based at NASA Ames Research Center and were the first all-girls team to reach the finals at FRC world championships. They are known for their extensive community outreach and work to expand menstrual equity and eliminate period poverty. The Space Cookies helped launch the Girl Scout STEM Pledge, a national initiative to reduce the gender gap in STEM fields by bringing millions of girls into the STEM pipeline.

Girl Scouts currently has 127 badges and journeys under the STEM category. In 2020, Girl Scouts announced the addition of 24 new badges in STEM, entrepreneurship, and leadership.

Age Level	STEM Badges/Awards									
Age Level	Automotive	Coding for Good	Cybersecurity	Mechanical Engineering	Robotics	Space Science	STEM Careers	Journeys		Other STEM related badges
Daisy	Design, Engineering, Manufacturing	Coding Basics, Digital Game Design, App Development	Basics, Safeguards, Investigator	Board Game, Model Car, Roller Coaster	What Robots Do, How Robots Move, Design a Robot	Space Science Explorer	—	Between Earth and Sky	Think Like a Citizen Scientist, Think Like a Programmer, Think Like an Engineer	—
Brownie	Design, Engineering, Manufacturing	Coding Basics, Digital Game Design, App Development	Basics, Safeguards, Investigator	Fling Flyer, Leap Bot, Race Car	Programming Robots, Designing Robots, Showcasing Robots	Space Science Adventurer	Brownie STEM Career Exploration	WOW! Wonders of Water	Think Like a Citizen Scientist, Think Like a Programmer, Think Like an Engineer	Bugs, Home Scientist, Inventor, Making Games
Junior	Design, Engineering, Manufacturing	Coding Basics, Digital Game Design, App Development	Basics, Safeguards, Investigator	Balloon Car, Crane, Paddle Boat	Programming Robots, Designing Robots, Showcasing Robots	Space Science Investigator	Junior STEM Career Exploration	GET MOVING!	Think Like a Citizen Scientist, Think Like a Programmer, Think Like an Engineer	Animal Habitats, Detective, Digital Photographer
Cadette	—	Coding Basics, Digital Game Design, App Development	Basics, Safeguards, Investigator	—	Programming Robots, Designing Robots, Showcasing Robots	Space Science Researcher	Cadette STEM Career Exploration	Breathe	Think Like a Citizen Scientist, Think Like a Programmer, Think Like an Engineer	Digital Movie Maker, Netiquette, Science of Happiness, Special Agent, Woodworker
Senior	—	Coding Basics, Digital Game Design, App Development	Basics, Safeguards, Investigator	—	Programming Robots, Designing Robots, Showcasing Robots	Space Science Expert	—	Sow What?	Think Like a Citizen Scientist, Think Like a Programmer, Think Like an Engineer	Game Visionary, Science of Style, Sky, Social Innovator, Truth Seeker, Website Designer
Ambassador	—	Coding Basics, Digital Game Design, App Development	Basics, Safeguards, Investigator	—	Programming Robots, Designing Robots, Showcasing Robots	Space Science Master	—	Justice	Think Like a Citizen Scientist, Think Like a Programmer, Think Like an Engineer	Photographer, Water

The Automotive, Coding for Good, Cybersecurity, Mechanical Engineering, and Robotics badges are all series of three awards that cover different areas in their respective topics. These badges can be earned separately but are all related by the topic that they cover. Additionally, these badges mostly have the same name across levels, but have unique requirements for each level that get more complex and in-depth through the different age levels.

In June 2017, Girl Scouts announced a partnership with Palo Alto Networks to create 18 cybersecurity badges by September 2018.

== National convention ==
Every three years Girl Scouts holds an international convention, featuring voting on policies and procedures, as well as guest speakers and activities and events for upwards of 10,000 girls and Girl Scout alums. The 2020 convention was conducted virtually due to concerns about COVID-19, and the latest convention was held in 2023 at Walt Disney World in Florida.

=== Destinations ===
Once known as "Wider Opportunities" or "Wider Ops", Destinations are travel opportunities for individual older Girl Scouts. Destinations are held within the United States and in other countries. Destinations are primarily international, outdoor, science, people, or apprenticeship oriented, such as kayaking in Alaska, or career oriented such as learning about working for NASA.

A "Destination" may be a trip to one of the WAGGGS World Centers:

- Our Cabaña in Cuernavaca, Mexico
- Our Chalet in Adelboden, Switzerland
- Pax Lodge in London, England
- Sangam World Centre in Pune, India
- Kusafiri in Africa

== Traditions ==
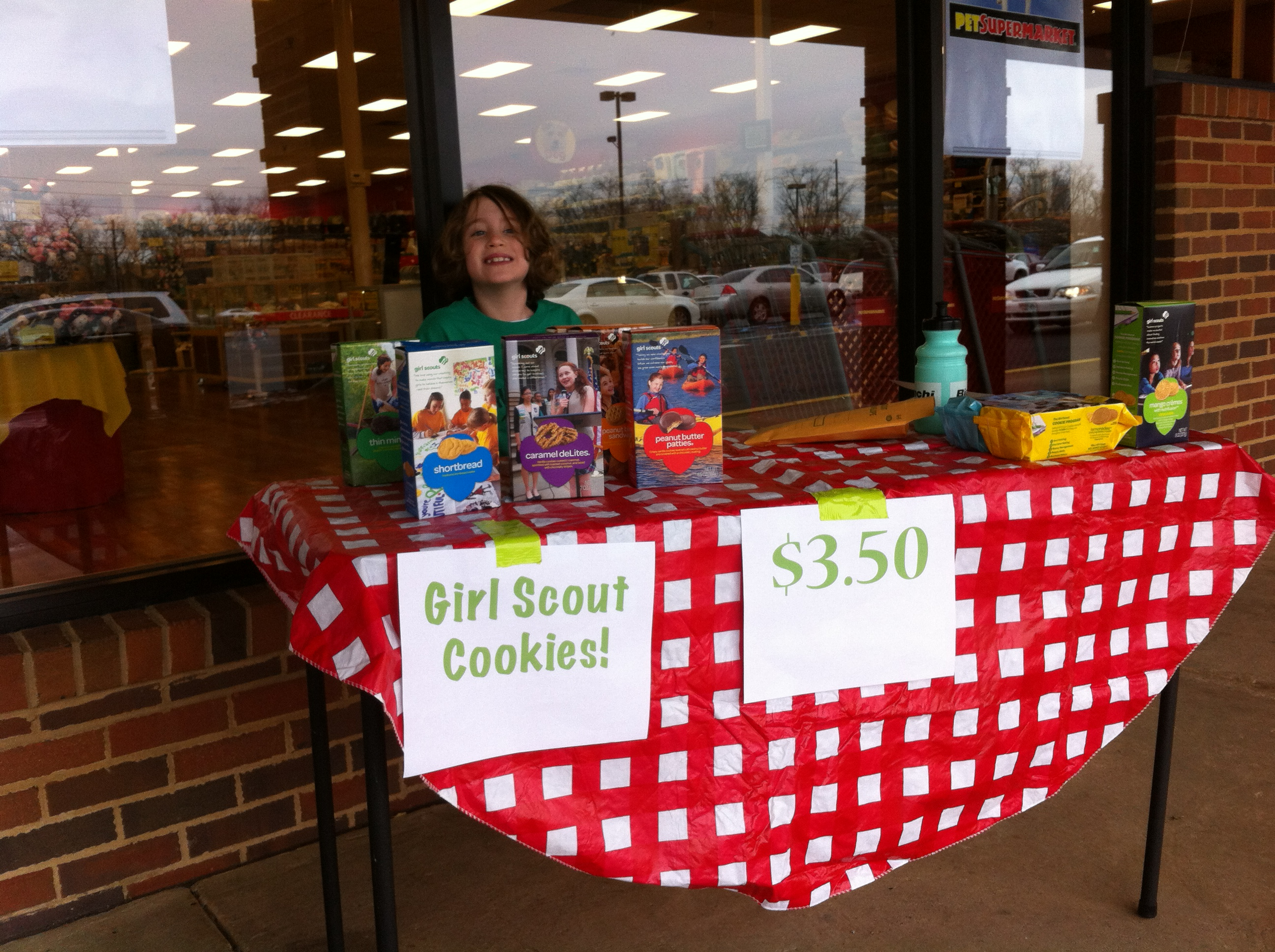
A girl selling Girl Scout Cookies

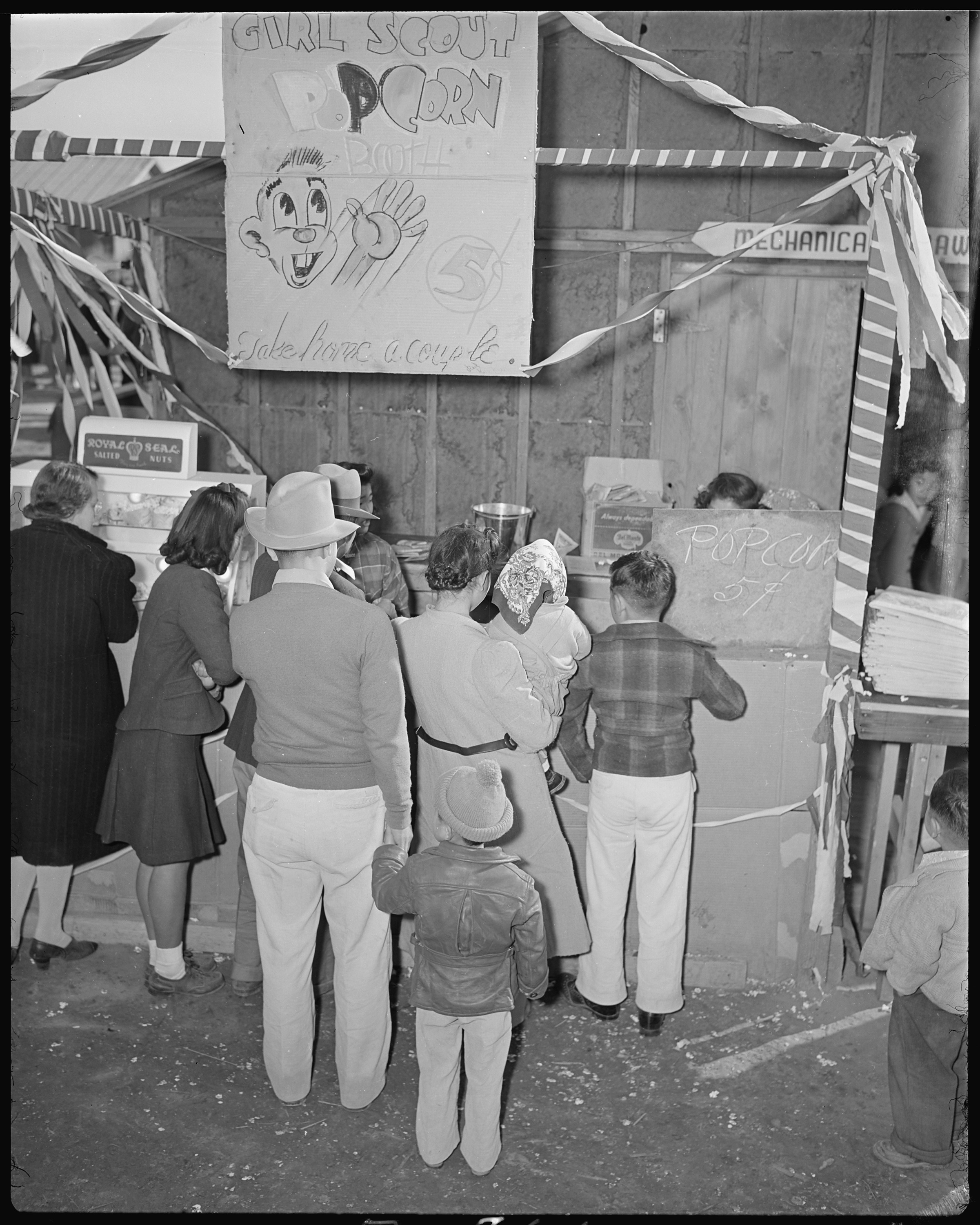
Poston AZ Scouts 1955

The Girl Scouts of the USA have many customs and traditions: camping, community service, singing, and money earning to support their activities. The Girl Scout Handshake and the Girl Scout signal for silence are two shared by WAGGGS member organizations. Other traditions include the Friendship Circle with "the squeeze," taking bandanas and homemade sit-upons on camping trips, and the buddy system.

"Bridging" is the process of going from one level to another. Bridging is usually done at the troop level, although area bridgings are often held. The girls that are bridging walk across a bridge to their new level and are greeted with the Girl Scout Handshake. A bridging ceremony takes place in San Francisco, where Girl Scout Juniors transition to Cadettes by crossing the Golden Gate Bridge.

World Thinking Day and "Girl Scouts' Own" are traditions throughout the world of Girl Scouting. World Thinking Day has occurred annually since 1926 on February 22, the birthday of both Robert Baden-Powell and Olave Baden-Powell. On World Thinking Day, Girl Scouts and Guides around the world think about their sisters in other lands; Councils or local service units (associations) hold a celebration on or near this day, in which each participating troop gives a presentation of the culture and customs of a country selected by the troop. Many Girl Scouts in America celebrate Juliette Gordon Low's birthday on October 31, Founder's Day. The parties often include the girls dressing up in Halloween costumes and serving birthday cake.

A "Girl Scouts' Own" is a special ceremony that expresses the spirit of Girl Scouting when the girls reflect upon their feelings about Girl Scouting and the world around them. A "Girl Scouts' Own" can have any theme, or none at all. It is a solemn time given for Girl Scouts to create a moment of their very own. It can be held at any time and include the girls' troop or be held at any inter-troop gathering.

== Badges and other awards ==
All levels of Girl Scouts can earn badges. Each level has specific badges that can be earned. Daisies earn badges shaped like flowers. Brownies earn badges shaped like triangles. Juniors earn badges shaped like circles. Cadettes earn badges shaped like diamonds. Seniors earn badges shaped like rectangles. Ambassadors earn badges shaped like squares.

Earned Badges and Awards are worn on the front of a Girl Scout's vest (or sash). Fun Patches are worn on the back of the vest. Daisies wear blue vests. Brownies wear brown vests. Juniors wear green vests. Cadettes, Seniors, and Ambassadors wear khaki vests. For Cadettes, Seniors, and Ambassadors, a Girl Scout may choose to wear the same khaki vest for all three levels. Active Girl Scouts, who earn a lot of badges, may opt to get a new khaki vest when they change levels, so they have more room to display their awards.

=== Skill building badges ===
Skill building badges
Badge group	Daisy	Brownie	Junior	Cadette	Senior	Ambassador
Promise & Law	Daisy Center & Petals	Brownie Girl Scout Way	Junior Girl Scout Way	Cadette Girl Scout Way	Senior Girl Scout Way	Ambassador Girl Scout Way
Cookie Business	Count It Up	Meet My Customers	Cookie CEO	Business Plan	My Portfolio	Research & Development
Cookie Business	Talk It Up	Give Back	Customer Insights	Marketing	Customer Loyalty	P&L
Cookie Business				Think Big		
Financial Literacy	Money Counts	Money Manager	Business Owner	Budgeting	Financing My Future	On My Own
Financial Literacy	Making Choices	Philanthropist	Savvy Shopper	Comparison Shopping	Buying Power	Good Credit
Financial Literacy				Financing My Dreams		
Troop Camping	Buddy Camper	Cabin Camper	Eco Camper	Primitive Camper	Adventure Camper	Survival Camper
Citizenship	Good Neighbor	Celebrating Community	Inside Government	Finding Common Ground	Behind the Ballot	Public Policy
Mechanical Engineering	Model Car Design Challenge	Race Car Design Challenge	Balloon Car Design Challenge			
Mechanical Engineering	Roller Coaster Design Challenge	Fling Flyer Design Challenge	Crane Design Challenge			
Mechanical Engineering	Board Game Design Challenge	Leap Bot Design Challenge	Paddle Boat Design Challenge			
Outdoors	Outdoor Art Maker	Outdoor Art Creator	Outdoor Art Explorer	Outdoor Art Apprentice	Outdoor Art Expert	Outdoor Art Master
Outdoors		Outdoor Adventurer	Horseback Riding	Archery	Paddling	Ultimate Recreation Challenge
Outdoors	Buddy Camper	Hiker	Camper	Trailblazing	Adventurer	
Outdoors	Snow or Climbing	Snow or Climbing	Snow or Climbing	Snow or Climbing	Snow or Climbing	Snow or Climbing
Outdoors	Trail Adventure	Trail Adventure	Trail Adventure	Trail Adventure	Trail Adventure	Trail Adventure
Robotics	What Robots Do	Programming Robots	Programming Robots	Programming Robots	Programming Robots	Programming Robots
Robotics	How Robots Move	Designing Robots	Designing Robots	Designing Robots	Designing Robots	Designing Robots
Robotics	Design a Robot	Showcasing Robots	Showcasing Robots	Showcasing Robots	Showcasing Robots	Showcasing Robots
Space Science	Space Science Explorer	Space Science Adventurer	Space Science Investigator	Space Science Researcher	Space Science Expert	Space Science Master
Cyber Security	Cyber Security Basics	Cyber Security Basics	Cyber Security Basics	Cyber Security Basics	Cyber Security Basics	Cyber Security Basics
Cyber Security	Cyber Security Safeguards	Cyber Security Safeguards	Cyber Security Safeguards	Cyber Security Safeguards	Cyber Security Safeguards	Cyber Security Safeguards
Cyber Security	Cyber Security Investigator	Cyber Security Investigator	Cyber Security Investigator	Cyber Security Investigator	Cyber Security Investigator	Cyber Security Investigator
Coding	Coding Basics	Coding Basics	Coding Basics	Coding Basics	Coding Basics	Coding Basics
Coding	Digital Game Design	Digital Game Design	Digital Game Design	Digital Game Design	Digital Game Design	Digital Game Design
Coding	App Development	App Development	App Development	App Development	App Development	App Development
Environmental Stewardship	Eco Learner	Eco Friend	Eco Camper	Eco Trekker	Eco Explorer	Eco Advocate
Adventure		Letterboxer	Geocacher	Night Owl	Traveler	
Animals		Pets	Animal Habits	Animal Helpers	Voice for Animals	
Artist		Painting	Drawing	Comic Artist	Collage	Photographer
Athlete		Fair Play	Practice with Purpose	Good Sportsmanship	Cross-Training	Coaching
College Preparation						College Knowledge
Craft		Potter	Jeweler	Book Artist	Textile Artist	
Creative Play		Making Games	Playing the Past	Field Day	Game Visionary	
Digital Arts		Computer Expert	Digital Photographer	Digital Movie Maker	Website Designer	
Do It Yourself		Household Elf	Gardener	Woodworker	Room Makeover	
First Aid		Brownie First Aid	Junior First Aid	Cadette First Aid	Senior First Aid	Ambassador First Aid
Cook		Snacks	Simple Meals	New Cuisines	Locavore	Dinner Party
Healthy Living		My Best Self	Staying Fit	Eating for You	Women's Health	
Innovation		Inventor	Product Designer	Entrepreneur	Social Innovator	
Investigation		Senses	Detective	Special Agent	Truth Seeker	
Manners		Making Friends	Social Butterfly	Netiquette	Business Etiquette	
Naturalist		Bugs	Flowers	Trees	Sky	Water
Performance		Dancer	Musician	Public Speaker	Troupe Performer	
Practical Life Skills		My Great Day	Independence	Babysitter	Car Care	
Science and Technology		Home Scientist	Entertainment Technology	Science of Happiness	Science of Style	
Storytelling		My Family Story	Scribe	Screenwriter	Novelist	
Leadership				Leader in action (WOW)		
Leadership				Leader in Action (Quest)		
Leadership				Leader in Action (World)		
Leadership				Leader in Action (any)		

=== Journey awards ===
Each level of Girl Scouting has multiple Journey programs. A Journey is a series of lessons on a particular topic. The Journeys are made up of multiple parts and all parts of the Journey must be earned for it to be complete. A Girl Scout who completes three Journeys at one level earns a Summit Pin. Before beginning work on a Bronze, Silver, or Gold Award project, a Girl Scout must complete one Journey at her level. A Girl Scout who did not earn her Silver Award must complete two Journeys at her current level, instead of one, to work on her Gold Award.

Daisy	Brownie	Juniors	Cadettes	Seniors	Ambassadors
Welcome to the Daisy Flower Garden	Brownie Quest	Agent of Change	aMAZE!	GIRLtopia	Your Voice, Your World
Between Earth and Sky	WOW! Wonders of Water	Get Moving!	Breathe	Sow What?	Justice
5 Flowers, 4 Stories, 3 Cheers for Animals	A World of Girls	aMUSE	MEdia	Mission: Sisterhood!	BLISS: Live It! Give It!
Think Like an Engineer	Think Like an Engineer	Think Like an Engineer	Think Like an Engineer	Think Like an Engineer	Think Like an Engineer
Think Like a Programmer	Think Like a Programmer	Think Like a Programmer	Think Like a Programmer	Think Like a Programmer	Think Like a Programmer
Think Like a Citizen Scientist	Think Like a Citizen Scientist	Think Like a Citizen Scientist	Think Like a Citizen Scientist	Think Like a Citizen Scientist	Think Like a Citizen Scientist
Outdoor Journey	Outdoor Journey	Outdoor Journey	Outdoor Journey	Outdoor Journey	Outdoor Journey

Girl Scouts has announced that Journeys will be retired on October 1, 2026. They will be replaced with updated leadership awards for Juniors through Ambassadors.

=== Additional awards ===
Girl Scouts can earn other awards, usually represented by pins. Some of these awards are: Leadership Torch, Community Service Bar, Service to Girl Scouting Bar, Bronze Cross, Medal of Honor, Cookie Activity Pin, Safety Pin, My Promise My Faith Pin, Counselor in Training I & II, Volunteer in Training, World Thinking Day Award, and Global Action Award.

Girl Scouts can also earn and display on their uniform awards from outside organizations, such as the religious emblems from religious organizations, or the President's Volunteer Service Award.

=== Highest awards ===
The highest achievement in Girl Scouting is the Girl Scout Gold Award, which can only be earned by Girl Scout Seniors and Ambassadors. The highest award for Girl Scout Cadettes is the Silver Award, and Bronze Award is the highest award for Girl Scout Juniors. These awards require large-scale service projects showing leadership along with service hours.

The Gold Award is the highest honor a Girl Scout can earn. This award can be earned by Girl Scout Seniors and Girl Scout Ambassadors. This prestigious award represents a Girl Scout's dedication and commitment to Girl Scouting and to her community. Earning the Girl Scout Gold Award requires hard work and a willingness to take on significant responsibility. For many, the leadership and organizational skills and sense of community and commitment that come from earning the Gold Award set the foundation for a lifetime of active citizenship. The Gold Award project takes a minimum of 80 hours to complete.

The Silver Award, the highest honor a Girl Scout Cadette can earn, gives girls the chance to do big things and make their community better in the process. The Silver Award takes the participants through a seven-step process: identify an issue, build a Girl Scout Silver Award team, explore the community needs, choose a project, develop the project, make a plan, and put it into motion. The Silver Award project takes a minimum of 50 hours to complete.

The Bronze Award, the highest honor a Girl Scout Junior can earn, requires girls to learn the leadership and planning skills necessary to follow through on a project that makes a positive impact on her community. Working toward this award demonstrates a Girl Scout's commitment to helping others, improving her community and the world, and becoming the best she can be. The Bronze Award project takes a minimum of 20 hours to complete.

=== Adult recognition ===
There are also GS awards for adults including: Outstanding Volunteer, Outstanding Leader, Appreciation Pin, Honor Pin, Thanks Badge, and Thanks Badge II. Outstanding Volunteer is awarded for Outstanding service as Girl Scout volunteer (other than a leader). Outstanding Leader is awarded for Outstanding service as Girl Scout leader. Appreciation Pin is awarded for exceptional performance beyond expectations for the position. The Honor Pin recognizes an adult member who has delivered exceptional service beyond expectations to two or more geographic areas, service units or program delivery audiences in a way that furthers the council's goals. Thanks Badge recognizes outstanding service for a Council as a whole or the Girl Scout Movement as a whole. Different GS councils use different terminology for regions within their council. Thanks Badge II is awarded where the recipient has received the Thanks Badge and the recipient's service continues to merit further recognition. At least one nomination, two endorsements, and a review of the forms is required for each of these awards.

== Effect on American life ==
Among the many famous American Girl Scouts are Taylor Swift, Sonia Sotomayor, Dakota Fanning, Lucille Ball, Katie Couric, Elizabeth Dole, Ann Landers, and Nancy Reagan. Many Girl Scouts have become successful leaders in numerous professional fields such as law, medicine, politics, journalism, and science. Beginning with Lou Henry Hoover, the incumbent First Lady has served as the honorary president of GSUSA. Lou Henry Hoover was also the actual president of the Girl Scouts from 1922 to 1925 and Chairman of the National board of directors from 1925 to 1928. A 1994 Chronicle of Philanthropy poll showed Girl Scouts ranked by the public as the eighth "most popular charity/non-profit in America" among more than 100 charities.

During World War I and World War II, girls involved in Scouts helped the Allied forces by selling defense bonds, growing victory gardens, and collecting waste fat and scrap iron. Girl Scouts also spread their values into their communities through community service projects such as soup kitchens and food drives.

Over twenty of NASA's female career astronauts were former Girl Scouts. The first American woman to spacewalk was a former Girl Scout, Dr. Kathryn Sullivan.

=== The American Girl ===
Girl Scouts published its own magazine from 1917 to 1979. The name changed from The Rally (October 1917–May 1920) to The American Girl (eventually dropping "The"). Circulation exceeded 200,000 in the 1940s, and reached as high as 510,000 per month by 1949. It can be confused with American Girl magazine, 1992–2019.

=== Girl Scout Senior Roundups ===
International Girl Scout gatherings named Senior Roundups were held every three years from 1956 until 1965:

- Milford, Michigan (1956) attended by 5,000 girls
- Colorado Springs, Colorado, from July 3, 1959, to July 12, 1959, with 10,000 girls
- Button Bay, Vermont from July 18, 1962, to July 31, 1962, with 9,000 girls
- Farragut, Idaho, from July 17, 1965, to July 26, 1965, with 12,000 girls

== Issues ==
=== Religion ===
==== Non-sectarian founding ====
When Girl Scouts was first organized, the organization claimed to be "non-sectarian in practice as well as theory". By the early 1920s, Catholic Girl Scout units had been founded in New York, Philadelphia, Washington and other cities. In the 1920s, about 2,000 Girl Scouts were Catholic. During this time, the organization upheld standards which were consistent with the beliefs of the Catholic religion. From its founding in 1912, it had Jewish leaders and scouts.

==== "To serve God" in the Promise ====
Since 1993, Girl Scouts have been able to substitute something appropriate to their own beliefs for the phrase "To serve God" in the Girl Scout Promise. This option appears in the guidelines distributed to adult volunteers but not in the actual girls' books. Official volunteer documentation contains this note:

Girl Scouts of the USA makes no attempt to define or interpret the word "God" in the Girl Scout Promise. It looks to individual members to establish for themselves the nature of their spiritual beliefs. When making the Girl Scout Promise, individuals may substitute wording appropriate to their own spiritual beliefs for the word "God."

This note or a shorter variant also frequently appears on local council web pages.

Volunteers are reminded "to be sensitive to the spiritual beliefs of the girls in your group and to make sure that everyone in the group feels comfortable and included in Girl Scouting" and to feel free to share the policy with the girls' families.

The policy change was prompted by lawsuits and attempts to be more inclusive. Atheist parents sued the Boy Scouts of America in 1991 for denying membership in the Cub Scouts to their sons. Considering this news, the Totem Girl Scout Council of Seattle attempted to change the Girl Scout Promise to make mention of "God" optional, which would be more inclusive of local non-theist Native American and Southeast Asian girls. After the national organization asserted this could not be changed locally, the Seattle council advocated that the change be adopted nation-wide. In November 1992, the parents of Nitzia Cuevas-Macias sued for their daughter to be permitted to participate in Girl Scouts even though she refused to promise to serve God.

On October 23, 1993, at the Girl Scouts of the USA annual national convention, delegates voted 1,560 "yes" against 375 "no" to permit individuals to substitute another word or phrase for "God" in their promise. The convention gave this explanation:

For some individuals, the word "God", no matter how broadly interpreted, does not appropriately reflect their spiritual beliefs. Since the belief in a spiritual principle is fundamental to Girl Scouting, not the word used to define that belief, it is important that individuals have the opportunity to express that belief in wording meaningful to them. It is essential to maintain the spiritual foundation of Girl Scouting, yet be inclusive of the full range of spiritual beliefs. This [policy change] does not take the word "God" out of the Girl Scout Promise. It gives those individuals who wish to do so the option to state their commitment to the spiritual concepts fundamental to the Movement with a word or words more appropriate to their own beliefs. For instance, an individual may say "my faith" or "Allah" or "the Creator".

This policy change settled the Cuevas-Macias lawsuit.

Some consider that the Girl Scouts of the USA have not gone far enough in making Scouting open to non-theists; others that they have gone too far in removing God or that they are violating the constitution of the WAGGGS. In 2017, some parents still find the perceived religious aspects of the Girl Scouts enough of a reason not to sign up their daughters to participate. The WAGGGS constitution requires member societies to maintain membership standards to include a promise similar to the one established by Baden-Powell, which includes the concept of duty to God. The GSUSA policy adopted in 1993 led to the 1995 formation of an alternative organization, the American Heritage Girls that accepts only leaders and chartering organizations that agree with a specific Christian statement of faith. The organization had a little over 5,000 members in 2006. According to the organization, membership as of 2017 is over 43,000.

==== Prayer at meetings ====
The official Girl Scout policy does not ban or require prayer.

The Girl Scout organization does not endorse or promote any particular philosophy or religious belief. Our movement is secular and is founded on American democratic principles, one of which is freedom of religion. Although Girl Scouts has policies supporting religious diversity, there is no policy by Girl Scouts of the USA that prohibits or requires the saying or singing of a grace, blessing, or invocation before meals by Girl Scout members in a troop/group setting, in a resident or day camp, or at meetings, conferences, and other large events. The decision to say a grace, blessing, or invocation is made locally at the troop or group level, and should be sensitive to the spiritual beliefs of all participants.

==== Religious pin ====
Girl Scouts of the USA has an optional "My Promise, My Faith" pin which girls in all grades may earn. Girls may also do religious recognition programs and wear the resulting emblem on their uniform; however, these are created and administered by the religious organizations and not by Girl Scouts directly.

=== Sexuality and gender issues ===
Girl Scouts of the USA stated in an October 1991 letter:

As a private organization, Girl Scouts of the U.S.A. respects the values and beliefs of each of its members and does not intrude into personal matters. Therefore, there are no membership policies on sexual preference. However, Girl Scouts of the U.S.A. has firm standards relating to the appropriate conduct of adult volunteers and staff. The Girl Scout organization does not condone or permit sexual displays of any sort by its members during Girl Scout activities, nor does it permit the advocacy or promotion of a personal lifestyle or sexual preference. These are private matters for girls and their families to address.

GSUSA upholds a "don't ask, don't evangelize" policy on sexuality. The debate over this issue is split between those who feel that the policy should avoid and prevent discrimination on the grounds of sexual orientation, and those who question the inclusion of lesbians.

In October 2011, the Girl Scouts of Colorado council publicly stated, "If a child identifies as a girl and the child's family presents her as a girl, Girl Scouts of Colorado welcomes her as a Girl Scout", when overturning a local troop's rejection of a seven-year-old transgender girl. In July 2015, the Girl Scouts of Western Washington returned a $100,000 donation after the donor stipulated that the money could not be used to support services for transgender Scouts. The group then set up an online fundraising campaign to recoup the lost funds, ultimately raising $250,000.

In January 2012, a teen in California created a video calling for the boycott of Girl Scout Cookies in response to Girl Scouts' policy of inclusion for transgender girls. The viral video became a rallying cry for both supporters and opponents of the group's stance on transgender members. In February 2016, Robert James Carlson, the Roman Catholic archbishop of St. Louis, urged parishioners to cut ties with the Girl Scouts over the group's embrace of LGBT rights.

Girl Scouts themselves defended their actions against this. "For 100 years, Girl Scouts has prided itself on being an inclusive organization serving girls from all walks of life. We handle cases involving transgender children on a case-by-case basis, with a focus on ensuring the welfare and best interests of the child in question and the other girls in the troop as our highest priority."

=== Local objections to sex education sponsored by Planned Parenthood in Waco, Texas ===
GSUSA is not aligned with and does not endorse, at the national level, the reproductive health organization Planned Parenthood; Girl Scout councils may choose to have or not have connections with Planned Parenthood. In 2003, in Waco, Texas, the local Bluebonnet Council was listed as a co-sponsor, with the Girl Scouts logo printed on the promotional flyer, of the Planned Parenthood of Central Texas event titled "Nobody's Fool '03: Dating, Love, Sex & HIV." In 2004, the same Council promoted a Planned Parenthood education event without providing money nor sending Girl Scouts to it. This was criticized by some anti-abortion movement supporters and social conservatives, resulting in a local attempt to boycott Girl Scout cookies sold by the Bluebonnet Council. Waco residents responded to the announced boycott by purchasing a record number of cookies, and the Bluebonnet Council dropped promotion of the event. A month later, GSUSA CEO Kathy Cloninger went on NBC's Today show, defending the Bluebonnet Council's decision to sever ties with Planned Parenthood.

=== The Radical Brownies ===
In 2014, Marilyn Hollinquest and Ana Yvette Martinez, both women of color, founded the Radical Brownies, a community group for girls of color in Oakland, California. Similar to the GSUSA, but created specifically for girls of color, the Radical Brownies endeavors to "empower and encourage" girls of color and cultivate sisterhood and community bonds between them.

According to the Radical Brownies' mission statement at the time of its founding, its aim was to empower young girls of color to "step into their collective power" and to make the world a more "radical" place. The Radical Brownies wear brown berets and vests in homage to the Brown Berets and Black Panther movements. The group's members, ages 8–12 years old, can earn badges in "radical beauty," "food justice," and "radical self-love."

==== Name controversy ====
In February 2015, despite Radical Brownies co-founder Hollinquest clarifying that the group claimed no affiliation with the GSUSA, the GSUSA contacted the Radical Brownies organization and informed them that their troop's name and uniforms caused "some confusion" among GSUSA membership. According to GSUSA Chief Communications Officer Kelly Parisi, once the founders of the Radical Brownies were notified of the misunderstanding, they offered to change the group's name.

In May that same year, the Radical Brownies renamed themselves the Radical Monarchs.

== Presidents ==
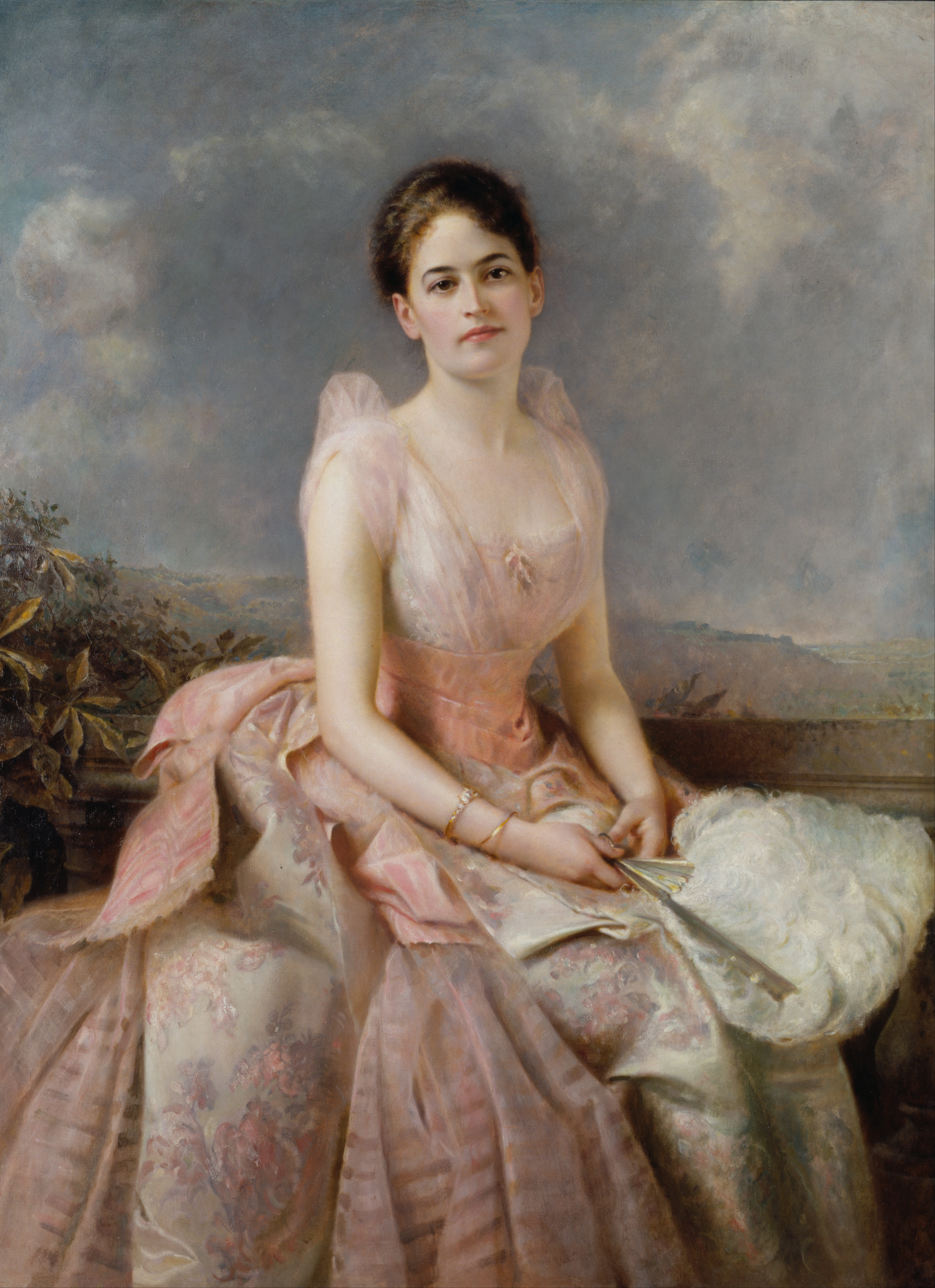
Portrait of Juliette Gordon Low (1887)

- Juliette Gordon Low (1915–1920)
- Anne Hyde Choate (1920–1922)
- Lou Henry Hoover (1922–1925) (1935–1937)
- Sarah Louise Arnold (1925–1943) (first Dean of Simmons College, 1902–1921)
- Mira Hoffman (1926–1930) (Mrs. William H. Hoffman)
- Birdsall Otis Edey (1930–1935) (Mrs. Frederick Edey) (after ceasing to be president she became National Commissioner for Girl Scouts until her death in 1940)
- Henrietta Bates Brooke (1937–1939) (Mrs. Frederick H. Brooke) (died 1967, her husband was the architect Frederick H. Brooke who designed the District of Columbia War Memorial)
- Mildred Mudd (1939–1941) (she later supported the founding of Harvey Mudd College named after her husband, Harvey Seeley Mudd)
- Helen Means (1941–1945) (Mrs. Alan H. Means) Later chairwoman of the World Board (WAGGGS) (1952–1957)
- Harriet Rankin Ferguson (1946–1951) (Mrs. Vaughan C. Ferguson)
- Olivia Cameron Higgins Layton (1951–1957) (Mrs. Roy F. Layton) (died 1975)
- Marjorie Mehne Culmer (1958–1963) (Mrs. Charles U. Culmer) (later chair of WAGGGS, died in 1994)
- Margaret W. Price (1963–1969) (Mrs. Holton R. Price Jr.) (died in 1973)
- Grace M. S. McKittrick MacNeil (1969–1972) (Mrs. Douglas H. MacNeil) (died in 2000)
- Marjorie Motch (1972–1975)
- Gloria Randle Scott (1975–1978)
- Jane C. Shields Freeman (1978–1984) (her husband is Orville Freeman)
- Betty Fuller Pilsbury (1984–1990), she received the Silver Buffalo Award in 1986.
- B. LaRae Orullian (1990–1996)
- Elinor Johnstone Ferdon (1996–1999)
- Connie L. Matsui (1999–2002)
- Cynthia B. Thompson (2002–2005)
- Patricia Diaz Dennis (2005–2008)
- Connie L. Lindsey (2008–2013)
- Kathy Hopinkah Hannan (2014–2020)
- Karen P. Layng (2020–2023)
- Noorain Khan (2023–present)

=== Chief executive officers ===
The title has changed over the years.

National Secretaries:

- Edith D. Johnston (June 1913 – June 1914)
- Cora Neal (June 1914 – June 1916)
- Montague Gammon (June 1916 – August 1917)

National Directors:

- Abby Porter Leland (August 1917 – February 1919)
- Jane Deeter Rippin (February 1919 – November 1930)
- Josephine Schain (November 1930 – September 1935)
- Constance Rittenhouse (September 1935 – December 1950)

National Executive Directors:

- Dorothy C. Stratton (December 1950 – July 1960)
- Sally Stickney Cortner (July 1960 – May 1961; interim)
- Louise A. Wood (May 1961 – April 1972)
- Dr. Cecily Cannan Selby (April 1972 – September 1975)
- Frank H. Kanis (September 1975 – July 1976; interim)
- Frances Hesselbein (July 1976 – February 1990); was awarded the Presidential Medal of Freedom in 1998 in part for her work in Girl Scouts.
- Mary Rose Main (February 1990 – October 1997)
- Joel E. Becker (October 1997 – January 1998; interim)
- Marsha Johnson Evans (January 1998 – July 2002); retired rear admiral, left Girl Scouts to become president of the American Red Cross

Chief executive officers:

- Jackie Barnes (July 2002 – October 2003; interim)
- Kathy Cloninger (October 2003 – November 2011)
- Anna Maria Chávez (November 2011 – June 2016)
- Sylvia Acevedo (July 2016 – August 2020; served in interim capacity from July 2016 to May 2017)
- Judith Batty (August 16, 2020 – January 27, 2022; interim)
- Sofia Chang (January 27, 2022 – February 2023)
- Bonnie Barczykowski (February 2023 – present)

== 100th anniversary ==
GSUSA celebrated the 100th anniversary of its founding by Juliette Gordon Low with a "Bridge to the Second Century" event on November 13, 2011, at the GS National Convention in Houston and other sites around the country. The Anniversary was also celebrated by participation in the world-famous Pasadena, California Tournament of Roses Parade of 2012, featuring the Girl Scouts 100th Anniversary float, which was designed and decorated by Girl Scouts.

US president Barack Obama signed the "Girl Scouts of the USA Commemorative Coin Act" for the 100th Anniversary celebration. The act authorized the minting of 350,000 silver dollar coins in honor of Girl Scouts and the achievements of the 50 million women influenced by Girl Scouting during the last 100 years.

Colorado staged a vigorous campaign to create a special license plate to honor the Girl Scout Centennial. The Girl Scouts of Minnesota and Wisconsin River Valleys hosted "The Great Girl Gathering", a Centennial Celebration on March 10 and 11, 2012 for 140,000 girls at the Mall of America in Bloomington, Minnesota.

Build-A-Bear Workshop had a limited-edition Girl Scout bear and outfits for the 100th anniversary.

The Girl Scout Council of the Nation's Capital in Washington, DC hosted a 100th Anniversary Sing-Along on the National Mall, on June 9, 2012, called Girl Scouts Rock the Mall: 100th Anniversary Sing-Along. The Rock the Mall event drew more than 200,000 people to the national mall to celebrate Girl Scouting and cost $2 million.

Girl life-sized Scouts of Citrus, in partnership with Walt Disney World, held a special 100th anniversary bridging event on May 25–28, 2012. The Bridging into the Next Century event provides Girl Scouts from all over the country an opportunity to celebrate the spirit of Girl Scouting at Epcot.

Cincinnati Museum Center held a daytime and overnight event to celebrate in partnership with the Girl Scouts of Western Ohio, who Ohio designed an exhibit, which was on display for free until May 13, 2012. The exhibit displays old uniforms, literature and discussed the role of Girl Scouts for the last 100 years.

GSUSA made a new cookie called Savannah Smiles to commemorate the anniversary.

The Girl Scouts of Northeast Texas hosted the Girl Scouts national exhibition at the 2012 State Fair of Texas in the historic Hall of State. At the State Fair of Texas, visitors were able to indulge in a Fried Samoa, be part of a virtual campfire, walk through a life-sized cookie box and see a replica of Juliette Gordon Low's house.

In Savannah, Georgia, where Girl Scouting was founded, they hosted a "Party in the Park" in Forsyth Park where there was a Centennial Honor Guard consisting of girls wearing vintage uniforms from the Girl Scout First Headquarters. The uniforms represented various eras: 1912 (replica), 1914, 1928, the 1940s, 1960s, 1970s, 1980s, and the present.

The city of Savannah closed part of the Talmadge Bridge so girls could walk the bridge and "Bridge to the next century". Savannah also had a "Sunrise Service" with the CEO, Anna Maria Chavez. The Honor guard from the park carried the Eternal Flame.

The city of Savannah dedicated their annual "Georgia Day" to Juliette.

== Similar organizations ==
Camp Fire Girls was founded in 1910, two years prior to Girl Scouts, by some of the creators of the Boy Scouts of America. In 1975, the group became co-educational and soon afterwards changed its name to "Camp Fire Boys and Girls". The name was changed to Camp Fire USA in 2001 and to Camp Fire in 2012. As of 2009, the group has a membership of about 750,000.

Various religious groups have established their own youth clubs such as Missionettes (now Mpact Girls) for the Assemblies of God. Little Flowers Girls' Club is a Catholic-focused girls club. GEMS Girls' Clubs is a non-denominational group with a Calvinist/Reformed background. Pioneer Girls started as a Methodist group but is non-denominational. The Masonic Lodge which requires belief in a Supreme Being has their own set of service organizations targeted at young and teenage girls, The International Order of the Rainbow for Girls and Job's Daughters International.

One youth group explicitly set up as a Christian alternative to Girl Scouts is the American Heritage Girls (AHG), started in 1995 in West Chester, Ohio, by a group of parents upset with available female Scouting organizations. AHG is a Christian organization that states that it is "a nonprofit organization dedicated to the mission of building women of integrity through service to God, family, community and country." As of 2020, it claims a membership (adult and youth) of over 50,000.

== See also ==
- Girl Scout Museum and Archives
