= Evelyn Norah Shullai =

Evelyn Norah "Rani" Shullai is an educationalist and a pioneer of Girl Guiding in India. She has received numerous awards including the Silver Star from the Indian government and the Silver Elephant from the Bharat Scouts and Guides. Shullai is the second Padma Shri recipient in Meghalaya, given in 1977.

== Family life ==
Shullai married a fellow teacher, H. Pariat, from the Jowai Government School in the Jaintia Hills. He died before the birth of their child, Judith. She remarried. She has several grandchildren. Her hobbies include winemaking and cooking, and formerly gardening and knitting.

== Girl Guiding ==
Shullai was involved in Girl Guiding in her time at Welsh Mission Girls’ High School (now called Presbyterian Secondary School) in Shillong, and continued while she studied at Scottish Church College in Calcutta. Here she was a Ranger and was involved for six years with a village near Serampore, teaching hygiene and enabling villagers to construct wells. In 1980, she led the Indian contingent to the international camp in Sydney. In 1984, she represented India at WAGGGS' World conference in New York City. Shullai has been awarded the Silver Elephant.

== Educational career ==
Shullai taught at the Jowai Government School and the American Ludlow Jute Mill School, the latter twenty-eight miles from Calcutta. She became headmistress of the Assamese M.E. School and opened a Montessori school on campus.

Shullai was appointed the first assistant Inspector of Schools for hill areas of composite Assam and later as Inspector of Schools in Shillong for a decade. In between, the Assam government sent her to the Central Institute in Delhi to study for a M Ed. After her retirement, a school was opened in Shillong in her name - the Shullai Progressive School. Shullai teaches in the school.

== See also ==
- Sangam World Girl Guide/Girl Scout Center
