= M. S. Rajan =

Indian academic (1920–2010)

Prof. M. S. Rajan
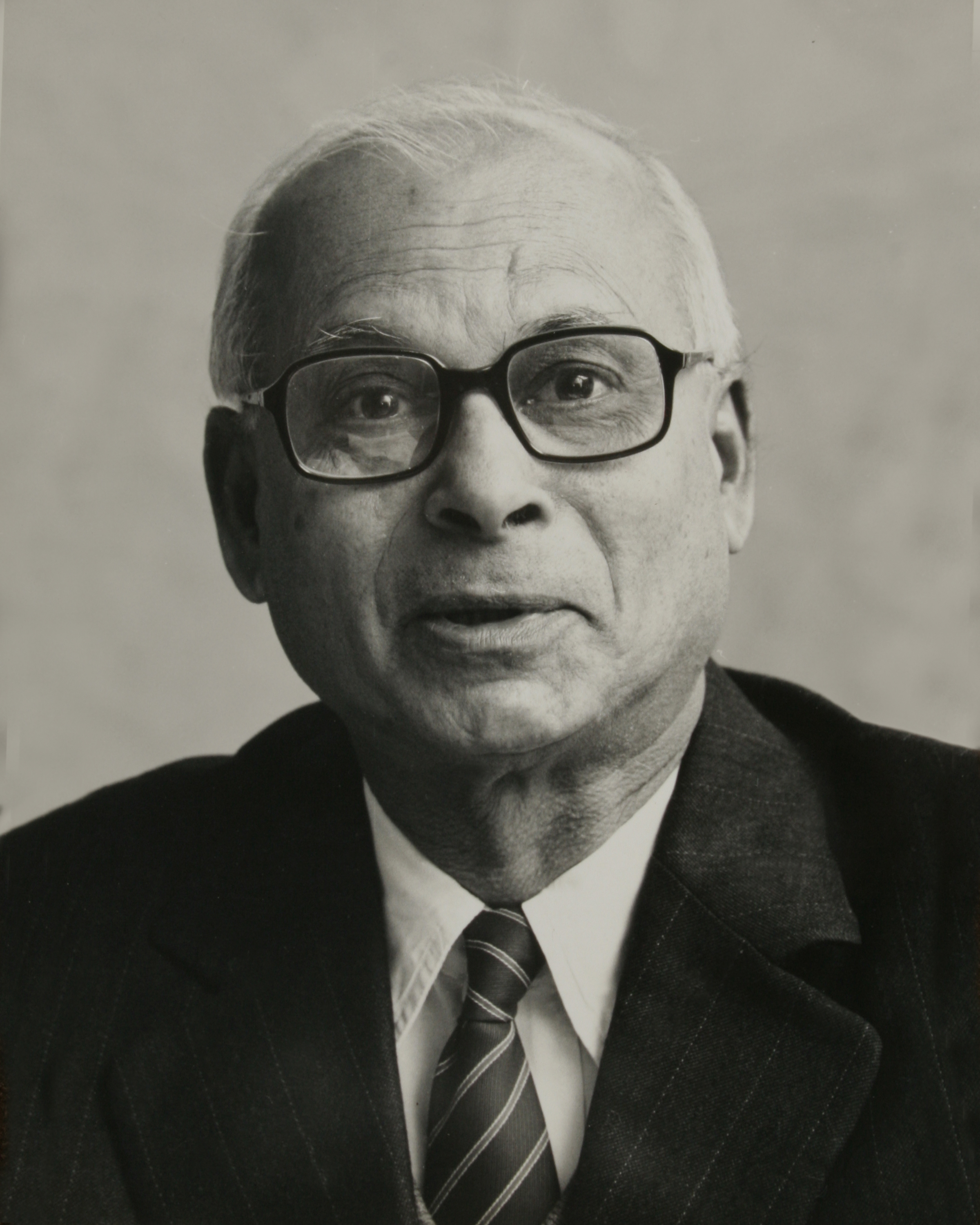
- Prof. M. S. Rajan (circa 1990)

Indian School of International Studies, Director
- In office 1965–1971

Professor of International Organisation, JNU
- In office 1971 – 1984

Personal details
- Born: 1920 Madanapalle, Madras Presidency, British India (present day Annamayya, Andhra Pradesh, India)
- Died: 17 February 2010 (aged 89–90) New Delhi, India
- Education: University of Mysore
- Occupation: Academician

Mannaraswamighala Sreeranga Rajan (1920 – 17 February 2010) was an Indian academic who is widely acknowledged as the doyen of International Relations and Area Studies in India. Professor Rajan set up the Indian School of International Studies along with Pandit Hriday Nath Kunzru and Professor A. Appadorai in 1955.

== Early life and education ==
Born near Madanapalle on the Andhra-Karnataka border in 1920, his early schooling was in Karnataka and he went on to complete his post-graduation from the University of Mysore in 1943. He received a Fulbright Scholarship in 1956 and enrolled at Columbia University, New York. Even though he enrolled for a PhD under the guidance of Leland M. Goodrich, he could not complete it since he was called back to India to oversee the construction of Sapru House, the headquarters of the Indian Council of World Affairs, in 1952. He was subsequently awarded a D.Litt. by the University of Mysore in 1963 for his book, United Nations and Domestic Jurisdiction.

== Personal life ==
Rajan was married to Padma for more than 50 years. He is survived by three children, Pushpa Rangan, Vani Subramaniam and Kanna Rajan.

== Career ==
=== Indian Council of World Affairs ===
Rajan came to Delhi in July 1947 when he was 27 years old, and joined the Asian Relations Organisation as Assistant Secretary. He played a key role in organising the Asian Relations Conference in 1947. He joined the Indian Council of World Affairs in 1949 as its Administrative Secretary. He was entrusted with the responsibility of overseeing the construction of its iconic office, Sapru House, on Barakhamba Road, which was completed in 1955.

=== Indian School of International Studies ===
Shortly after the ISIS was set up under the auspices of the ICWA in 1955, he took up position in 1959, first as Special Fellow, and subsequently as Professor of Commonwealth Studies. He became the second Director of the ISIS after Professor Appadorai demitted the office in 1965 and served for six years. He continued the rigorous standards set by Prof. Appadorai with the intention of making it one of the leading institutes of learning in the field of International Relations and Area Studies. Students were selected following an all-India exam and interview process, and had to exhibit an aptitude for research. Among Professor Rajan's initiatives was the establishment of State Government scholarships for PhD students.

=== School of International Studies, JNU ===
Prof. Rajan oversaw the merger of the ISIS with the Jawaharlal Nehru University after the latter was established in 1969. The JNU Vice-Chancellor G Parthasarathi acceded to his insistence that the faculty should be appointed on tenure rather than through contract. However, he was unable to prevent the bifurcation of the Sapru House Library based on ownership of books, journals and documents. Rajan was the very first professor on the rolls of JNU as also the first to be made Professor Emeritus. He remained Director of the School until 1971 and continued as Professor of International Organisation until 1984.

== Academic accomplishments ==
Prof. Rajan was prolific in his academic pursuits, with over 25 authored/edited books and over 110 articles in reputed journals. He was, at various times, the editor of International Studies, India Quarterly and a journal that he brought out in the 1980s, The Non-Aligned World. His focus areas were India's foreign policy, non-alignment and the role of international organisations, particularly the United Nations. In addition, he initiated the process that ensures every Indian Foreign Service officer passes through a rigorous course at JNU to broaden their perspective in foreign affairs.

=== Books ===
- Rajan, Mannaraswamighala Sreeranga (1958). United Nations and domestic jurisdiction. Orient Longmans. p. 679.
- Rajan, M.S., ed. (1977). India's foreign relations during the Nehru era : some studies. Bombay: Asia Pub. House. ISBN 9780210222898.
- Rajan, M.S. (1978). Japan's postwar peace settlements. Atlantic Highlands, N.J.: Humanities. Pr. ISBN 9780391008694.
- Ganguly, Shivaji (1981). Rajan, M.S. (ed.). Great power relations, world order, and the Third World. New Delhi: Vikas. ISBN 9780706910735.
- Appadorai, A.; Rajan, M.S. (1985). India's foreign policy and relations. New Delhi: South Asian Publishers. ISBN 9788170030546.
- Mani, V.S.; Murthy, C.S.R. (1987). Rajan, M.S. (ed.). The Nonaligned and the United Nations. Dobbs Ferry, N.Y.: Oceana Publications. ISBN 9780379207880.
- Rajan, M.S. (1993). Studies on India's foreign policy. New Delhi: ABC Pub. House. ISBN 9788171230556.
- Rajan, M.S. (1994). Nonalignment and the nonaligned movement in the present world order. Delhi: Konark Publishers. ISBN 9788122003543.
- Rajan, M.S. (1995). World order and the United Nations : essays from a nonaligned perspective. New Delhi: Har-Anand Publications. ISBN 9788124103265.
- Rajan, M.S., ed. (1996). United Nations at fifty and beyond. New Delhi: Lancers Books. ISBN 9788170950585.
- Rajan, M.S. (1997). Recent essays on India's foreign policy. Delhi: Kalinga Publications. ISBN 9788185163819.
- Rajan, M.S. (1997). International and area studies in India. New Delhi: Lancers Books. ISBN 9788170950660.
- Rajan, M. S. (1999). India and international affairs : a collection of essays. New Delhi: Lancers Books. ISBN 9788170950714.
