= Anil Jain (Uttar Pradesh politician) =

Indian surgeon and politician

Dr. Anil Jain
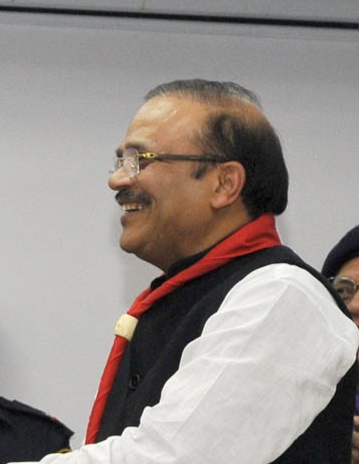

Member of Parliament, Rajya Sabha
- Incumbent
- Assumed office 3 April 2018
- Preceded by: Alok Tiwari
- Constituency: Uttar Pradesh

President, The Bharat Scouts and Guides
- Incumbent
- Assumed office November 2016
- Preceded by: Ashok Gehlot

President of All India Tennis Association
- Incumbent
- Assumed office 2020
- Preceded by: Praveen Mahajan

Personal details
- Born: Firozabad (Uttar Pradesh)
- Party: Bharatiya Janata Party
- Education: MBBS
- Alma mater: King George Medical University, Lucknow
- Profession: Laparoscopic Surgeon
- Website: http://draniljain.co.in

Anil Jain is an Indian surgeon and politician. He was the National General Secretary of BJP and also in charge of BJP's Haryana and Chhattisgarh units. He was elected to Rajya Sabha, the upper house of the Indian Parliament, from Uttar Pradesh on 23 March 2018. He was elected as the President of the All India Tennis Association (AITA) for the tenure 2020 - 2024.

== Political career ==
Jain joined politics as an active member of Bhartiya Janata Party in 2001. His political career till date is as follows:
2001-2002: All India Joint Convener, Doctor Cell, BJP 2002-2007: All India Convener, Doctor Cell, BJP
2007-2013: Member, National Executive, BJP
Co-Incharge:
2007-2010 – Uttarakhand
2011-2013 – Jammu & Kashmir
2013–present: National Secretary, BJP
Co-inchrge : Haryana
