= Bharat Scouts and Guides =

National scouting and guiding association of India

- Headquarters: New Delhi
- Country: India
- Founded: 7 November 1950; 76 years ago
- Awarded for: Peace Messenger Award; Indira Gandhi Award for National Integration
- Membership: 6,251,269 Scout Wing 3,835,094 Guide Wing 2,416,175
- Chief National Commissioner: K. K. Khandelwal
- President: Anil Jain
- Affiliation: World Association of Girl Guides and Girl Scouts; World Organization of the Scout Movement
- Website bsgindia.org

Guide	Scout	rover

The Bharat Scouts and Guides (BSG) is the national Scouting and Guiding association of India. The national headquarters of BSG is recognised by the Government of India.

Scouting was founded in India in 1909 as an overseas branch of the Scout Association and became a member of the World Organization of the Scout Movement in 1938. Guiding in India started in 1911 and was amongst the founder members of the World Association of Girl Guides and Girl Scouts in 1928, also covering present-day Bangladesh and Pakistan at that time. The BSG serves 3,835,094 Scouts (as of 2021) and 1,286,161 Guides (as of 2005).

== History ==
=== Boy Scouts ===
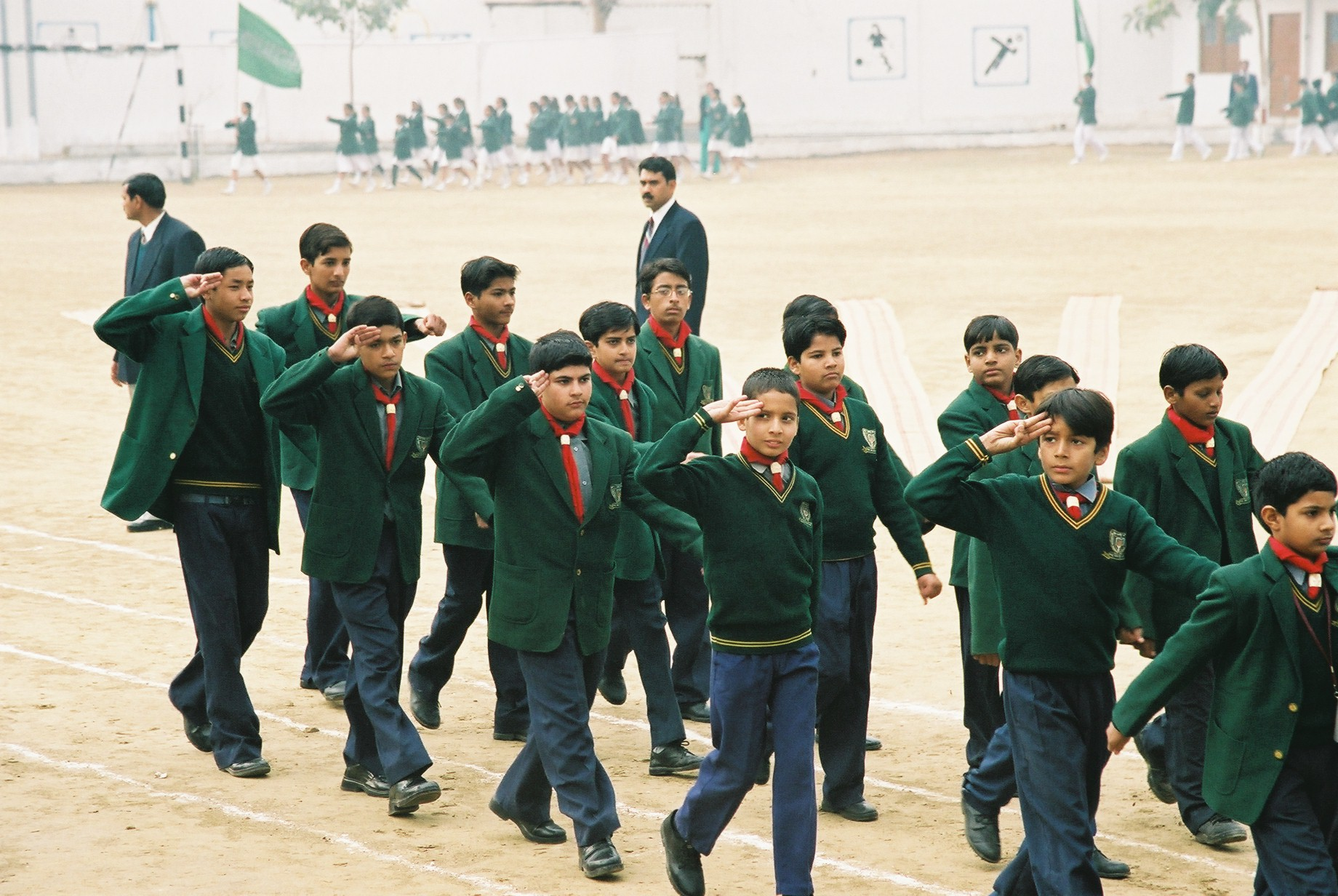
Boy Scouts in Delhi

Scouting was officially founded in British India in 1909, first started at the Bishop Cotton Boys School in Bangalore. Scouting for native Indians was started by Justice Vivian Bose, Madan Mohan Malaviya, Hridayanath Kunzru, Girija Shankar Bajpai, Annie Besant and George Arundale, in 1913. Prior to this date, Scouting was open only for British and foreign Scouts. In 1916, a Cub section was started, followed by the Rover section in 1918.

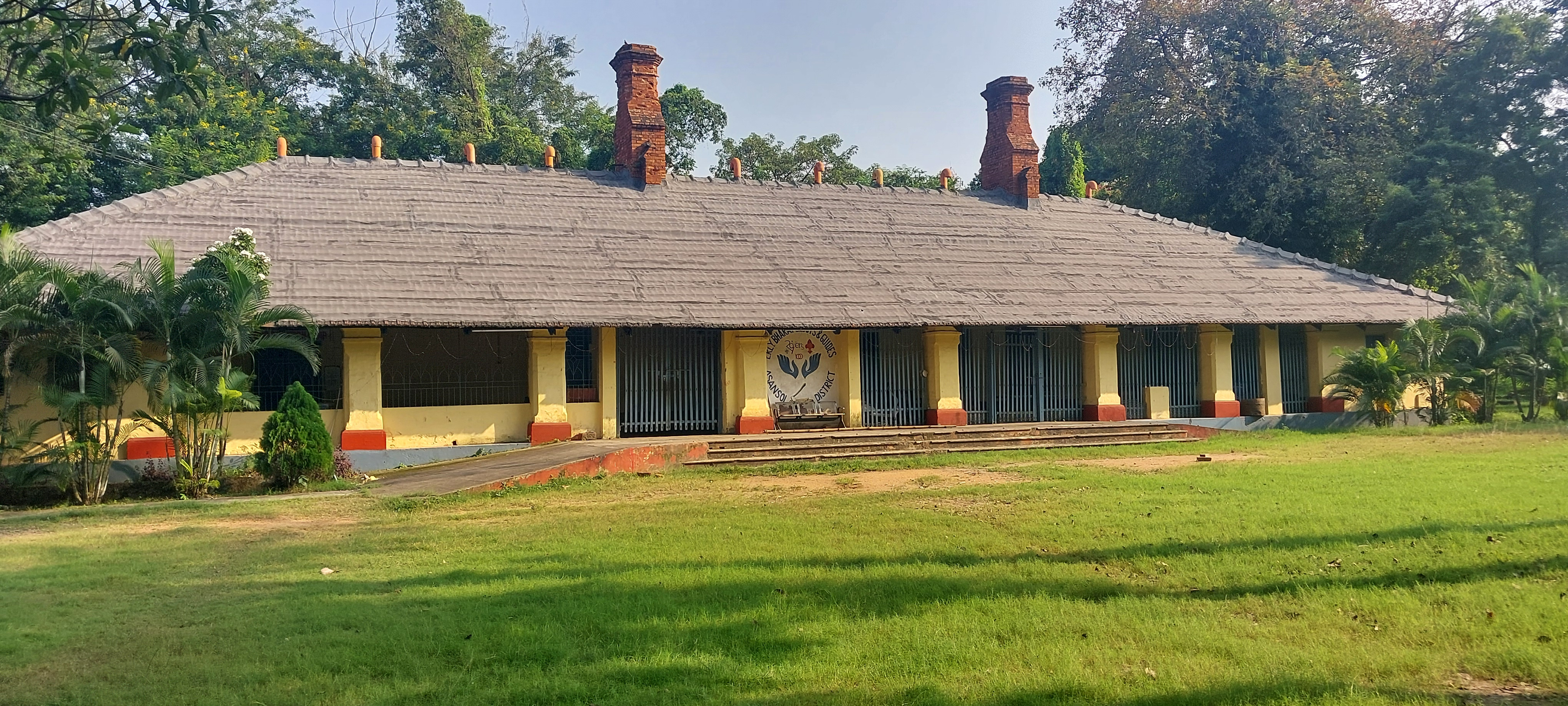
Eastern Railway Bharat Scouts camp in Asansol

In 1916, Calcutta's Senior Deputy Commissioner of Police J. S. Wilson introduced Scouting for Boys as a textbook in the Calcutta Police Training School. Colonel Wilson volunteered his services to the District Scout Commissioner, Alfred Pickford, and in 1917 became Assistant Scoutmaster of the Old Mission Church Troop. Together the two struggled for the admission of Indian boys into the Boy Scouts Association, which had not been admitted due to a Government of India order against it because "Scouting might train them to become revolutionaries". Shortly Wilson was acting as Cubmaster and Scoutmaster, and succeeded Pickford as District Commissioner in May 1919 when Pickford was promoted to Chief Scout Commissioner for India.

As a way of getting around the Government Order, the Boy Scouts of Bengal was founded, with identical aims and methods. Many separate Scout organizations began to spring up, the Indian Boy Scouts Association, founded in 1916, based in Madras and headed by Annie Besant and George Arundale; Boy Scouts of Mysore; Boy Scouts of Baroda; Nizam's Scouts in Hyderabad; Seva Samiti Scout Association (Humanity Uplift Service Society), founded in 1917 by Madan Mohan Malaviya and Hridayanath Kunzru and based in Allahabad; the aforementioned Boy Scouts of Bengal and likely others. A conference was held in Calcutta in August 1920 in which Wilson staged a Scout Rally, and as a result the Viceroy of India sent an invitation to Lord Baden-Powell, by then Chief Scout of the World, to visit India. Lord and Lady Baden-Powell arrived in Bombay in late January 1921 for a short tour of the subcontinent before leaving Calcutta for Rangoon. Alfred Pickford accompanied them and became one of their closest friends.

The emblem of the Boy Scouts Association in India–note modern Burma, Pakistan and Bangladesh are included in the map

The result of this visit was a union of all of the Scout organizations except the Seva Samiti Scout Association into The Boy Scouts Association in India. In 1922 Pickford returned to England and was appointed Overseas Commissioner of The Boy Scouts Association at their headquarters in London, but his aim of adding Indian boys into the program had been fulfilled.

In 1938, a number of members left the Boy Scouts Association in India after a wave of nationalism. They formed – together with the Seva Samiti Scout Association and the newly founded India National Scout Association – the Hindustan Scout Association, the first coeducational Scouting and Guiding organisation in India. In the same year, the Boy Scouts Association in India became a member of the World Organization of the Scout Movement.

=== Girl Guides ===
The first Girl Guides company was founded in Jabalpur in 1911 at Christ Church School. The movement immediately grew: In 1915, more than fifty companies existed with a membership of over 1,200, all of them directly registered with the Girl Guide Association and all restricted to girls of European descent. These companies formed the All India Girl Guides Association in 1916. In the same year the organisation opened for Indian girls.

J. S. Wilson provided transportation for Girl Guide rallies.

The girls themselves were never quite sure whether they preferred to ride in police vans or in the riot truck. The former concealed them from public view, but were very hot; the latter, being cages of expanded metal, were cooler, but reminiscent of the Calcutta Zoo!

In 1928, the All India Girl Guides Association joined the World Association of Girl Guides and Girl Scouts as one of its founder members. This membership was renewed in 1948 after the independence of India and its partition.

=== Bharat Scouts and Guides ===
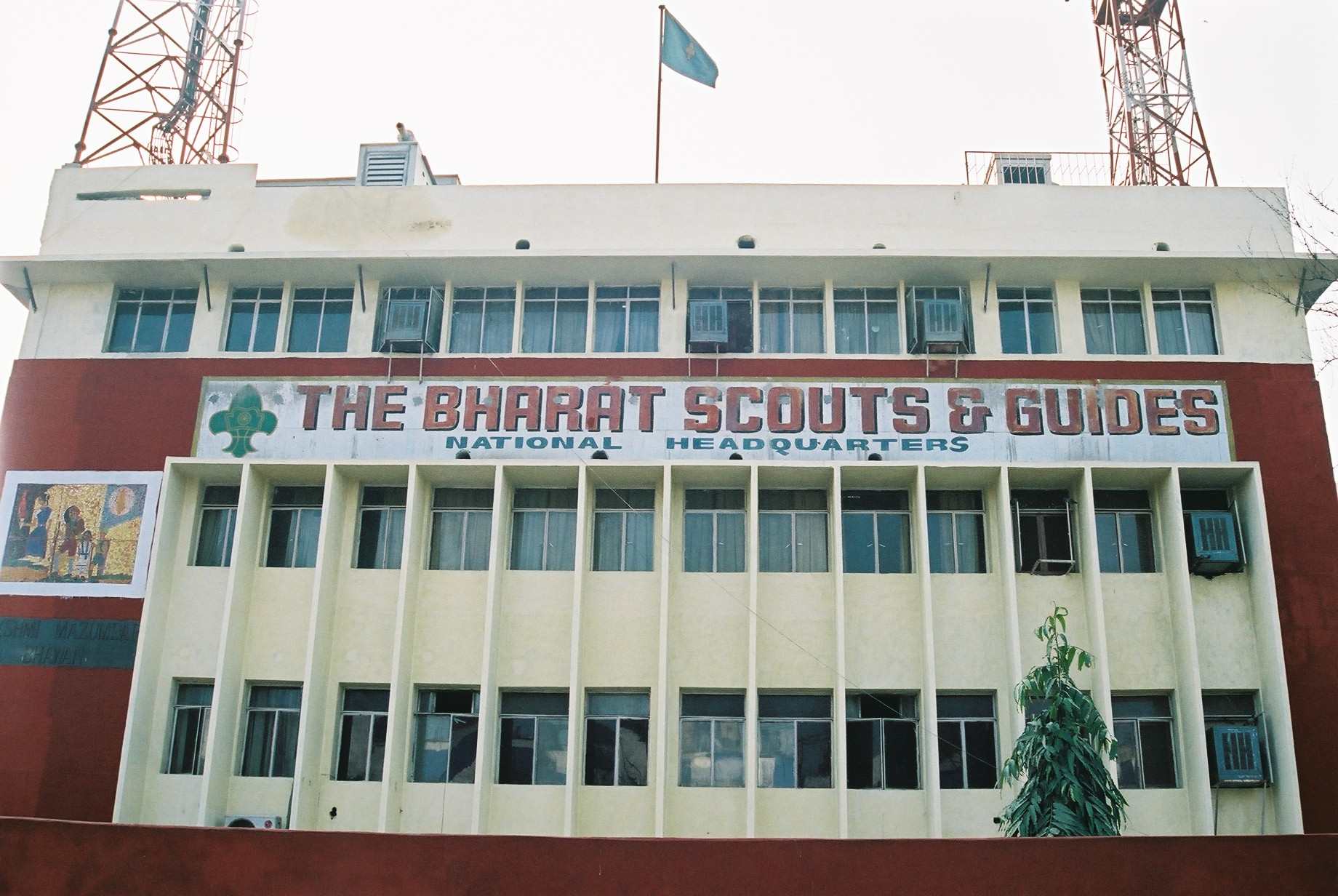
The Bharat Scouts and Guides National Headquarters, Delhi

In the first years after India's independence leading politicians, including Jawaharlal Nehru, Maulana Abul Kalam Azad and Mangal Das Pakvasa, as well as Scout leaders tried to unify India's Scouts and Guides. A first success was the merger of the Boy Scouts Association in India and the Hindustan Scout Association forming the Bharat Scouts and Guides on 7 November 1950. About a year later, on 15 August 1951, the All India Girl Guides Association joined this new organisation.

In 1959, the 17th World Scout Conference in New Delhi was hosted by the BSG. The Sangam World Girl Guide/Girl Scout Center in Pune, Maharashtra, India, opened in 1966. The idea for this fourth World Centre dates back to 1956 when it was developed during a WAGGGS International commissioners' meeting in New Delhi.

The United Nations selected the Bharat Scouts and Guides as honorary "Peace Messengers" for their significant and concrete contributions to the International Year of Peace in 1986.

=== Sethna's 18th West Bombay Scout Group ===
Sethna's 18th West Bombay Scout Group is the oldest continuously running Scout Group in India. It was established in 1914, when Rustomji Edulji Sethna (1898–1954) came across the book Scouting for Boys, written by Robert Baden-Powell, the founder of the Scout movement. He was enamoured by the book and formed one of India's first Scout groups for native boys. Prior to that, there existed some Scout groups, but they were primarily for the British expatriates in India.

Sethna resisted joining one of the competing Scout associations and registering his troop until Scouting became open for all irrespective of color, caste, or creed. He wrote to Baden-Powell about this discrepancy. In 1921 the regulations were changed and all were allowed to become part of the Scout movement in India. The 18th West has been continuously running since the day it started. None of the World Wars or the Partition of India stopped the group from functioning.

=== Notable members ===
Vivian Bose was a member of the World Scout Committee of the World Organization of the Scout Movement from 1947 until 1949.

In 1969, Mrs. Lakshmi Mazumdar was awarded the Bronze Wolf, the only distinction of the World Organization of the Scout Movement, awarded by the World Scout Committee for exceptional services to world Scouting.

== Program ==
The association describes its aims in its mission:

The mission of Scouting is to contribute to the education of young people, through a value system based on the Scout Promise and Law to help build a better world where people are self-fulfilled as individuals and play a constructive role in society.

Scout and Guide units are separate although they have some coeducational activities such as Jamborees, rallies, and conferences. Disabled boys and girls also participate in the Scouting program.

The Scout emblem incorporates a wheel with twenty-four spokes, known as the Ashoka Chakra, taken from the Ashoka pillar at Sarnath, in the green-and-saffron colors of the flag of India.

=== Sections and branches ===
The association is divided in four (respective three) sections according to age:

Bunnies (Both Boys and Girls) - ages 3 to 5

Bharat Scouts

- Cubs - boys, ages 5 to 10
- Scouts - boys, ages 10 to 17
- Rovers - boys, ages 17 to 25

Bharat Guides

- Bulbuls - girls, ages 5 to 10
- Guides - girls, ages 10 to 17
- Rangers - girls, ages 17 to 25

Additionally, there are four special branches:

- Extension Scouting
- Sea Scouting
- Air Scouting
- Venture Club Scheme

=== Awards ===
The highest awards are

- for the Cubs/Bulbuls section the "Golden Arrow Award"
- for the Scout/Guide section the Rashtrapati Scout/Guide Award
- for the Rover/Ranger section the Rashtrapati Rover/Ranger Award

=== Scout/Guide Motto ===
- Bunnies - Keep smiling
- Cubs/Bulbuls - Do your best
- Scouts/Guides - Be Prepared!
- Rovers/Rangers - Service

=== Scout/Guide Promise ===
"On my honor I promise that I will do my best
To do my duty to God (Note: The word "Dharma" may be substituted for the word "God" if so desired.) and my country
To help other people and
To obey the Scout/Guide law."

=== Scout and Guide Law ===
1. A Scout/Guide is trustworthy
2. A Scout/Guide is loyal
3. A Scout/Guide is a friend to all and a brother/sister to every other Scout/Guide.
4. A Scout/Guide is courteous
5. A Scout/Guide is a friend to animals and loves nature.
6. A Scout/Guide is disciplined and helps to protect public property.
7. A Scout/Guide is courageous.
8. A Scout/Guide is thrifty.
9. A Scout/Guide is pure in thought, word and deed.

== Membership ==
Sl. No.	State	Scout Wing	Guide Wing	Total
1	Andaman and Nicobar Islands	4,807	4,791	9,598
2	Andhra Pradesh	18,510	15,150	33,660
3	Arunachal Pradesh	6,583	6,706	13,289
4	Assam	5,755	3,922	9,677
5	Bihar	36,892	2,828	39,720
6	Central Railway	2,265	1,480	3,745
7	Chandigarh	7,200	6,106	13,306
8	Chhattisgarh	48,408	36,373	84,781
9	Dadra Nagar Haveli	658	392	1050
10	Daman and Diu			
11	Delhi	13,922	17,080	31,002
12	Eastern Railway	6,470	4,222	10,692
13	East Coast Railway	919	748	1,667
14	East Central Railway	2,533	1,572	4,105
15	Goa	24,639	25,315	49,956
16	Gujarat	38,115	26,872	64,987
17	Haryana	531,701	284,764	816,465
18	Himachal Pradesh	33,106	27,124	60,230
19	Jammu and Kashmir	4,605	3,999	8,604
20	Jharkhand	3,874	3,179	7,053
21	Karnataka	234,846	161,612	396,458
22	Kendriya Vidyalaya Sangathan	129,140	92,457	221,597
23	Kerala	63,160	74,918	138,078
24	Lakshadweep			
25	Madhya Pradesh	300,862	46,926	347,788
26	Maharashtra	800,666	647,207	1,447,873
27	Manipur	2,720	1,457	4,177
28	Meghalaya	7,969	9,806	17,775
29	Mizoram	1,948	2,425	4,373
30	Nagaland	2,041	1,864	3,905
31	Navodaya Vidyalaya Samiti	18,732	18,451	37,183
32	North Eastern Railway	7,776	5,294	13,070
33	Northeast Frontier Railway	5,679	3,245	8,924
34	Northern Railway	14,352	5,284	19,636
35	North Central Railway	2,629	1,165	3,794
36	North Western Railway	2,930	1,460	4,390
37	Odisha	47,974	19,552	67,526
38	Puducherry	1,728	819	2,547
39	Punjab	74,203	17,222	91,425
40	Rajasthan	845,594	219,176	1,064,770
41	Sikkim	1,869	1,734	3,603
42	South Central Railway	3,931	3,354	7,285
43	South Eastern Railway	1,863	1,245	3,108
44	South East Central Railway	3,975	3,405	7,380
45	South Western Railway	1,049	572	1,621
46	Southern Railway	3,020	1,836	4,856
47	Tamil Nadu	178,321	98,021	276,342
48	Telangana	9,145	6,489	15,634
49	Tripura	1,525	1,138	2,663
50	Uttar Pradesh	76,944	48,174	125,118
51	Uttarakhand	29,894	15,397	45,291
52	West Bengal	10,051	10,061	20,112
53	Western Railway	2,942	1,125	4,067
54	West Central Railway	1,946	1,305	3,251
55	Central Tibetan School			
56	Dubai			
57	Doha			
58	Saudi Arabia			
59	Muscat	4,733	4,730	9,463

== Leadership ==
Presidents

#	Name	Portrait	Took office	Left office
1	Mangal Das Pakvasa		1953	November 1960
2	Ammu Swaminathan		November 1960	March 1965
3	Bhuvaneshwar Prasad Sinha		April 1965	February 1967
4	Chandulal M. Trivedi		February 1967	October 1973
5	Dharma Vira		November 1973	September 1976
6	Jagjivan Ram		September 1976	April 1983
7	Shankarrao Chavan		April 1983	November 1998
8	Rameshwar Thakur		November 1998	November 2001
8	Rameshwar Thakur		November 2004	November 2013
9	Sharad Pawar		November 2001	November 2004
10	Ashok Gehlot		November 2013	November 2016
11	Anil Jain		November 2016	present

=== Chief National Commissioners ===
1. Dr. Hridya Nath Kunzru 1952 to November 1957
2. Justice Vivian Bose November 1957 to November 1959
3. Professor Madan Mohan November 1959 to November 1960
4. Dr. Hridya Nath Kunzru November 1960 to November 1964
5. Mrs. Lakhshmi Mazumdar November 1964 to April 1983
6. Lakshman Singh April 1983 to November 1992
7. V.P. Deenadayalu Naidu November 1992 to November 1995
8. Lalit Mohan Jain November 1995 to November 2013
9. Bhaidas I. Nagarale November 2013 to 25 May 2017
10. Dr. Krishana Kumar Khandelwal 9 July 2017 to present
- Title of National Commissioner changed to Chief National Commissioner on 30 November 2014

== Overseas units ==
The BSG maintains units for Indian citizens in Saudi Arabia, Qatar, Oman, United Arab Emirates, and Yemen.

== See also ==
- Lakshmi Mazumdar
- Evelyn Norah Shullai
- Satish Ranjan Das
- Sangam World Girl Guide/Girl Scout Center

== Literature ==
- Scouting 'Round the World, John S. Wilson, first edition, Blandford Press 1959 page 203.
