= Lakshman Singh (Scouting) =

Indian scouting leader

National Commissioner
- In office April 1983 - November 1992
- Preceded by: Lakhshmi Mazumdar
- Succeeded by: V.P. Deenadayalu Naidu
- Constituency: Bharat Scouts and Guides

Personal details
- Born: 26 August 1910 Babak, Punjab Province, British India
- Died: 4 February 1996 (aged 85) Turlock, California
- Spouse: Charan Kaur
- Children: 1 son Jasbir Nanar

Lakshman Singh (26 August 1910 – 4 February 1996) served as the National Commissioner of the Bharat Scouts and Guides from April 1983 to November 1992. He was a recipient of the Padma Bhushan, an Indian civilian honour.

In 1988, he was recognised as the 194th Bronze Wolf by the World Organization of the Scout Movement for exceptional services to world Scouting.

Preceded by Mrs. Lakhshmi Mazumdar	National Commissioners of the Bharat Scouts and Guides; 1983–1992	Succeeded by V.P. Deenadayalu Naidu
