= Lalit Mohan Jain =

Indian scouting leader

- ललित मोहन जैन

National Commissioner of the Bharat Scouts and Guides
- Incumbent
- Assumed office November 1995
- Preceded by: V.P. Deenadayalu Naidu

Lalit Mohan Jain ललित मोहन जैन, of the Indian Administrative Service, served as the National Commissioner of the Bharat Scouts and Guides from November 1995.

Jain served as the first Director of the National Informatics Centre from 1983 to 1984.

Jain (then International Scout Commissioner) took initiative to create the National Youth Complex at Gadpuri, which met with success on February 23, 1989 when a plot of 8.70 sq. acres was procured. The Lalit Mohan Jain Cub and Bulbul Park at the National Training Centre at Pachmarhi is named after him.

In 2008, he was awarded the 317th Bronze Wolf, an award of the World Organization of the Scout Movement, for exceptional services to world Scouting.

Preceded by V.P. Deenadayalu Naidu	National Commissioners of the Bharat Scouts and Guides; 1995–	Succeeded by
