= V. P. Deenadayalu Naidu =

Indian politician

V.P. Deenadayalu Naidu (16 August 1917 – 8 January 1998) was an Indian politician. He was elected mayor of Bangalore in 1955, served as the National Commissioner of the Bharat Scouts and Guides from November 1992 to November 1995. He also served as the Charter President of the Rotary Club of Bangalore East in 1971.

== Biography ==
Naidu was born in Bangalore to parents V.Papiah Naidu and Mrs. Alamelamma. He was an alumnus of St. Joseph's Boys' High School, Bangalore and St.Joseph's College, Bangalore. He completed a law degree at Pune and was a practising advocate. He was a member of the Bar, a Rotarian and a Scout. Naidu received the highest honour for a Scout - the Silver Elephant of the Bharat Scouts and Guides.

As a student of St.Joseph's College, Bengaluru, he was a student Leader leading the Freedom Movement and was imprisoned on three occasions along with other national leaders. He was a member of the All India Congress Committee and nominated member of the Mysore Legislative Council in 1948. He was conferred the Rajyotsava Award in 1993-94 by the Government of Karnataka for his outstanding services to the Freedom Movement and to Scouting and Social Services of Karnataka. He was posthumously conferred the Chairman's Award at the 19th Asia Pacific Regional Scout Conference, Hong Kong in July 1998.

He inherited part of his father's property, with a condition, that he can not sell them, only his children can, after his death . He was an advocate, and well versed with the law, yet he along with his son Venketesh, sold his Eagle Street property to Mr Krishna Reddy, who sold it further . Then he made his daughters to file a case and demand two thirds of the property .The courts agreed, that the first sale was bad in law, and the builder lost his money.

Preceded by Lakshman Singh	National Commissioners of the Bharat Scouts and Guides; 1992–1995	Succeeded by Lalit Mohan Jain
