= Lakshmi Mazumdar =

Indian scouting commissioner

National Commissioners of the Bharat Scouts and Guides
- In office 1964–1983
- Preceded by: Dr. Hridyanath Kunzru
- Succeeded by: Lakshman Singh

Lakshmi Mazumdar of Delhi was the National Commissioner of the Indian Scouting organization Bharat Scouts and Guides from November 1964 to April 1983, and supervised the construction of the Sangam World Girl Guide/Girl Scout Centre, which was inaugurated on 16 October 1966 by the World Chief Guide, Lady Olave Baden-Powell.

Mazumdar joined Guiding at a very young age in 1922. After India's independence, she held increasingly high responsibilities. In 1969 Mazumdar was awarded the Bronze Wolf, the only distinction of the World Organization of the Scout Movement, awarded by the World Scout Committee for exceptional services to world Scouting.

She received the Padma Shri in 1965.

Preceded by Dr. Hridyanath Kunzru	National Commissioners of the Bharat Scouts and Guides; 1964–1983	Succeeded by Lakshman Singh
