= Poornima Arvind Pakvasa =

Indian independence activist and social worker

- Born: October 5, 1913; Ranpur, Gujarat, India
- Died: 25 April 2016 (aged 102); Surat, Gujarat, India
- Occupation: Social worker

Poornima Arvind Pakvasa (5 October 1913 – 25 April 2016), known as the Didi of Dangs, was an Indian independence activist and social worker from Gujarat.

== Early life ==
Pakvasa was born in Ranpur near Limbdi State, Saurashtra (now in Gujarat). She was also a Manipuri dancer and classical vocal singer.

== Political and social activism ==
Pakvasa first met Mahatma Gandhi at Ranpur when she was eight. She participated in the independence movement in Limbdi. At the age of 18, she participated in the Dandi March during which she was arrested. Her inmate in jail was Kasturba Gandhi. Pakvasa taught her how to read and write English. Mahatma Gandhi was appreciative of this act and gave her his blessings to continue on the path of education.

She participated in the 51st session of the Indian National Congress at Haripura in 1938.

In 1954, she started Shaktidal, an institution for the cultural, physical and spiritual education of women in Bombay (now Mumbai). She headed the Bhosla Military School, Nashik for 25 years. Later in 1974, she established Ritambhara Vishwa Vidyapeeth and extended its activities to become a residential school and college at Saputara. The school chiefly served tribal girls of Dang. She turned 100 in October 2013 and died on 25 April 2016 at the age of 102 in Surat. Her last rites were performed in Saputara by her children.

== Awards ==
In 2004 she was awarded the Padma Bhushan award for her services to society. She was awarded Santokbaa Award in 2013.

== Personal life ==
She married Arvind Pakvasa and was a daughter-in-law of Mangaldas Pakvasa. She had two daughters - Aarti and Sonal Mansingh - and a son Anuj. Sonal Mansingh is an Indian classical dancer.
