= Irene Mott Bose =

American social worker in India

- Born: Irene Mott; 18 September 1899; Wooster, Ohio
- Died: 22 December 1974 (aged 75); Nagpur, India
- Spouse: Vivian Bose
- Parent: John Mott

Irene Mott Bose (18 September 1899 – 22 December 1974), known socially as Mrs. Vivian Bose, was an American-born social worker and writer based in India, and the wife of Indian Supreme Court justice Vivian Bose.

== Early life and education ==
Irene Mott was born in Wooster, Ohio, the daughter of John R. Mott and Leila Ada White Mott. Her father, a Christian pastor and writer, won a Nobel Peace Prize in 1946; her mother was a teacher. Her older brother, John Livingstone Mott, received the Kaisar-i‐Hind silver medal in 1931, for his work with the YMCA in India. Her younger brother, Frederick Dodge Mott, worked in healthcare planning in Canada, and was Canada's representative to the World Health Organization.

Irene Mott graduated from Vassar College in 1922, with further studies in public health and health education at Harvard University and Columbia University.

== Career ==
Soon after graduating from college, Mott went to India to work with her brother, who was a missionary among cotton mill workers. She helped establish a school and a small hospital, and set up a training program for social workers in Nagpur. She and her husband made an anthropological study of a nomadic group, the Rabari people of Kutch, from 1969 to 1973.

Bose wrote two children's books about India, The Monkey Tree (1956) and Totaram: The Story of a Village Boy in India Today (1933). An excerpt of Totaram was included in an American school reader, Roads to Everywhere (1961), as "When Totaram Washed the Elephant." She donated some of her father's papers to the Centre of South Asian Studies at Cambridge, where her papers were also, eventually, archived.

== Personal life ==
Mott married judge Vivian Bose in 1930. They had a son, Christopher, and a daughter, Leila. When Christopher was a toddler, the Boses traveled as a family by car, with her sister and his sister, from India to Albania. She died in 1974, aged 75 years. In 2006, a collection of her letters and diaries was published as An American Memsahib in India: The Letters and Diaries of Irene Mott Bose 1920-1951. There are 13 folders of photographs and other materials related to Irene and Vivian Bose's studies of the Rabari people in the Walter Fairservis Papers at Penn Libraries.
