= Sonal Mansingh =

Indian classical dancer and politician

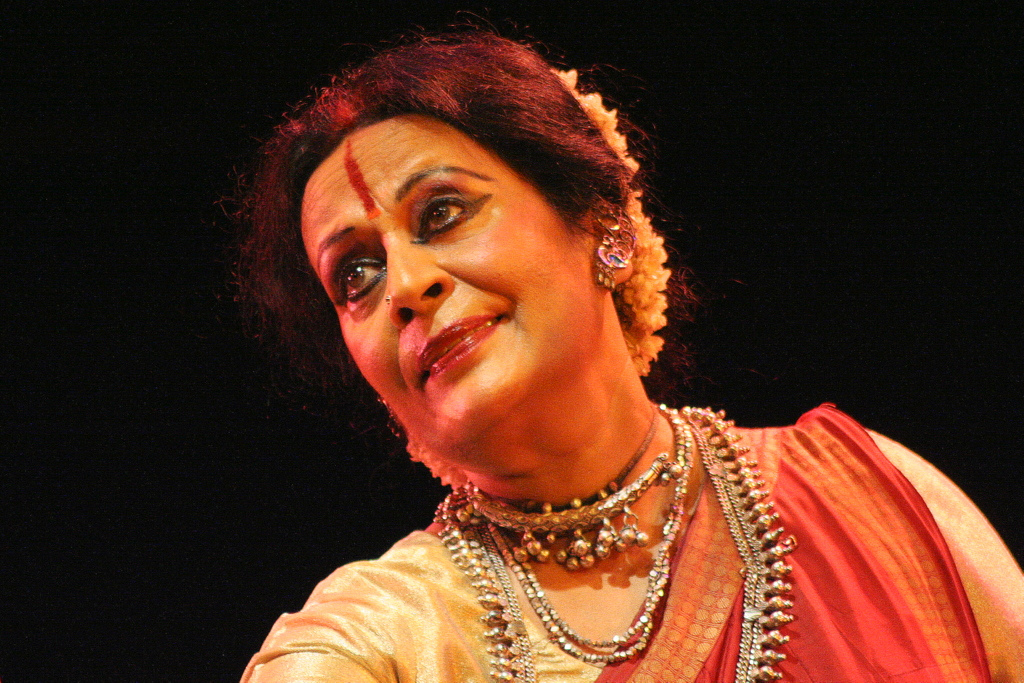
- Sonal Mansingh performing in New Delhi.

Member of Parliament, Rajya Sabha
- In office 14 July 2018 – 23 July 2024
- Preceded by: K. Parasaran
- Succeeded by: Harsh Vardhan Shringla
- Constituency: Nominated (Arts)

Personal details
- Party: Bharatiya Janata Party
- Parents: Arvind Pakvasa (father); Poornima Pakvasa (mother)
- Musical career
- Born: Sonal Pakvasa; 30 April 1944 (age 82); Bombay, Bombay Presidency, British India
- Origin: India
- Genres: Odissi, Bharatanatyam
- Occupations: Indian Classical Dancer; Guru; Motivational Speaker; Politician
- Years active: 1961–present
- Website: www.sonalmansingh.in

Sonal Mansingh (born 30 April 1944) is an Indian classical dancer, Bharatanatyam and Odissi dance guru and politician. She was nominated by the President of India to become a Member of Parliament, Rajya Sabha. She was a recipient of the Padma Bhushan in 1992 and the Padma Vibhushan in 2003.

== Early life and background ==
Sonal Mansingh was born in Mumbai, the second of three children of Arvind and Poornima Pakvasa, a noted social worker from Gujarat and Padma Bhushan winner in 2004. Her grandfather was Mangal Das Pakvasa, a freedom fighter, and one of the first five Governors of India.

She started learning Manipuri dance at age four, along with her elder sister, from a teacher in Nagpur. At age seven, she started learning Bharatnatyam from various gurus belonging to the Pandanallur school, including Kumar Jayakar in Bombay

She has "Praveen" and "Kovid" degrees in Sanskrit from Bharatiya Vidya Bhavan and B.A. (Hons) degree in German Literature from Elphinstone College, Bombay.

However, her formal training in dance started when at age 18, despite her family's opposition, she went to Bangalore, to learn Bharatanatyam from Prof. U. S. Krishna Rao and Chandrabhaga Devi at age 18, abhinaya from Mylapore Gowri Ammal, and later started learning Odissi from Guru Kelucharan Mohapatra in 1965.

Mansingh was married to former Indian diplomat Lalit Mansingh. The couple decided to divorce later. Her father-in-law Mayadhar Mansingh introduced her to Kelucharan Mohapatra where she had her training in Odissi.

== Career ==
Sonal Mansingh dancing career began in 1962, after her arangetram in Mumbai, and in 1977, she founded, Centre for Indian Classical Dances (CICD) in New Delhi.

Over the years, dance has taken her all over the world and brought her many awards, including the Padma Bhushan (1992), the Sangeet Natak Akademi Award in 1987, and the Padma Vibhushan, India's the second highest civilian award, in 2003; making her the second woman dancer in India to receive such an honour after Balasaraswati. This was followed by Kalidas Samman of Madhya Pradesh government, in 2006 and on 21 April 2007, she was conferred with Doctor of Science (Honoris Causa) by G.B. Pant University, Uttarakhand at Pantnagar and Doctor of Literature (Honoris Causa) by Sambalpur University.

To mark the completion of her 40 years in dancing in 2002, noted Hindi film director, Prakash Jha made a documentary film on her, title Sonal, which also won the National Film Award for Best Non-Feature Film for the year.

In 2018, she was honoured with Sangeet Natak Akademi Fellowship also known as Akademi Ratna, for her contribution in the field of performing arts.

== Political career ==
Mansingh was nominated to the Rajya Sabha in 2018, and served as the Member of Parliament until 2024. She has campaigned on behalf of BJP in various cultural functions.

== Choreographies ==
- Indradhanush
- Manavatta
- Mera Bharat
- Draupadi
- Gita Govinda
- Sabras
- Chaturang
- Panchkanya
- Devi Durga
- Aatmayan
- Samanavaya

== Awards ==
- Youngest recipient of Padma Bhushan in 1992 .
- Youngest recipient of Padma Vibhushan in 2003.
- In November 2019, Sonal Mansingh felicitated with Lifetime Achievement Award.

== Quotes ==
- "A dancer is not just a dancer. He/She is part of this environment. He/She does not exist in a vacuum. Society and its happenings have an impact on all individuals, especially artists. If an art form does not reflect the existing milieu, it stagnates."
- "Radha is a grand image too but she's a personification of love without which there is no creation. In our male-dominated HISTORY the image of Krishna at the feet of Radha, begging for her love, is most unusual. Gita Govind invokes deep spiritual thoughts, packaged in beautifully written verses".

== Bibliography ==
- The Penguin Book of Indian Dance by Sonal Mansingh, Penguin Books Australia. ISBN 0-14-013921-4.
- Classical Dances by Sonal Mansingh, Avinash Pasricha, Varsha Das. 2007, Wisdom Publications. ISBN 81-8328-067-6.
- Draupadi, by Sonal Mansingh; Museum Society of Bombay, 1994.
- Devpriya conversation with Sonal Mansingh by Yatindra Mishra; Vaani publication.

== See also ==
- Indian women in dance
