= School of International Studies (Jawaharlal Nehru University) =

Academic institution in India

School of International Studies, JNU
- Former name: Indian School of International Studies
- Established: 1955; 71 years ago
- Affiliations: Jawaharlal Nehru University
- Location: Delhi, India
- Website: www.jnu.ac.in/sis

The School of International Studies (SIS) (Hindi: स्कूल ऑफ इंटरनेशनल स्टडीज) (formerly Indian School of International Studies) is an academic institution created in 1955 which merged with the Jawaharlal Nehru University in 1970. It was founded by Pandit Hriday Nath Kunzru, Prof. A. Appadorai and Professor M.S. Rajan, under the auspices of the Indian Council of World Affairs. In the 15 years of its existence, it came to be noted as the leading institute of research in the area of International Relations and Area Studies in India. Many of its former faculty and students went on to occupy academic positions in other universities and research institutes across the country.

== History and structure ==
The School was created on the suggestion of the then Prime Minister and Foreign Minister, Jawaharlal Nehru, that there was the need for an institution to help build a pool of academic experts on international affairs and area studies who could give an informed second opinion on India's relations with the world. The school was inaugurated on 1 October 1955 in the presence of Prime Minister Jawaharlal Nehru and Vice President Sarvepalli Radhakrishnan. Though initially affiliated to the University of Delhi, it was granted deemed university status in 1961, and could independently grant degrees.

=== Centres ===
The School had eleven departments of study.

- International Politics and Organisation (including European studies)
- International law
- International economics
- South East Asian studies
- West Asian studies
- American studies
- African studies
- Commonwealth studies
- Russian studies

=== Directors of the school ===
The school's first director was Professor A. Appadorai, who served from 1955 to 1964. Several steps were taken by him to nurture this first effort of its kind. All students had to compulsorily attend a one-year pre-Ph.D course since they did not have a background in International relations. The School's second Director was Prof. M.S. Rajan and he served until the School was merged with the JNU in 1970. The School building at 35, Feroze Shah Road was constructed during his tenure and inaugurated in 1968. Prof. Rajan also solicited fellowships from the governments of the various Indian states for financially disadvantaged students from those states, a practice that continues to this day.

=== Merger with Jawaharlal Nehru University ===
The merger with JNU was opposed by the staff and scholars of the School since it was seen to imposed on the school by the government. However, there was nothing much that could be done since the government held the financial purse strings and began to squeeze the school financially to persuade it to fall in line. Even prior to this action, the School had been in the middle of a controversy in Parliament with a parliamentary committee set up to look into various allegations, in response to an intensive campaign run by various vested interests.

A controversy that followed the merger was the decision to bifurcate the library of the ISIS on the basis of ownership of books, documents and journals. The bifurcation was done in a bureaucratic style without regard to the wholeness of collections built up over a period of time, leading the last Director of the ISIS, Prof. M.S. Rajan to describe it as "one of the tragedies that struck ICWA as well as ISIS".

== Accomplishments over 15 years ==
- Sixty six researchers were awarded Ph.D degrees over a period of 15 years.
- More than sixty books were published by members of staff as well as students.
- The school journal International Studies began publication in 1959.
- 31 seminars were held all over India.
- The School Library, whose collections were held jointly with the Indian Council of World Affairs grew to become one of the biggest libraries in India on international and area studies
- The School trained officers of the Indian Foreign Service as well as diplomats from other countries especially from Bhutan and Nepal.
- The School had a program of visiting scholars and faculty and many well-known academics joined the School for short periods of time under this program, including Sardar K.M. Panikkar and Professors Tarachand, Nicholas Mansergh, Quincy Wright, and W.H. Morris-Jones.
- The School also started an annual series of extension lectures on major developments in international affairs in the mid 1960s, named after its late President, Pandit Hriday Nath Kunzru.

=== Notable Staff ===
- G. P. Deshpande, dean and academic
- Dr P.S. Rao, Indian International Lawyer (Pedra Branca dispute)

=== Notable alumni ===
- Nirmala Sitharaman, Indian Finance Minister
- S. Jaishankar, Indian External Affairs Minister (EAM) and former Foreign Secretary
- J.N. Dixit, former Indian Foreign Secretary
- Santishree D. Pandit, 13th Vice Chancellor of Jawaharlal Nehru University, New Delhi

== See also ==
- List of institutions of higher education in Delhi
- International Relation Studies
