= John Mott =

American ecumenical Christian awarded Nobel Peace Prize (1865–1955)

John Raleigh Mott
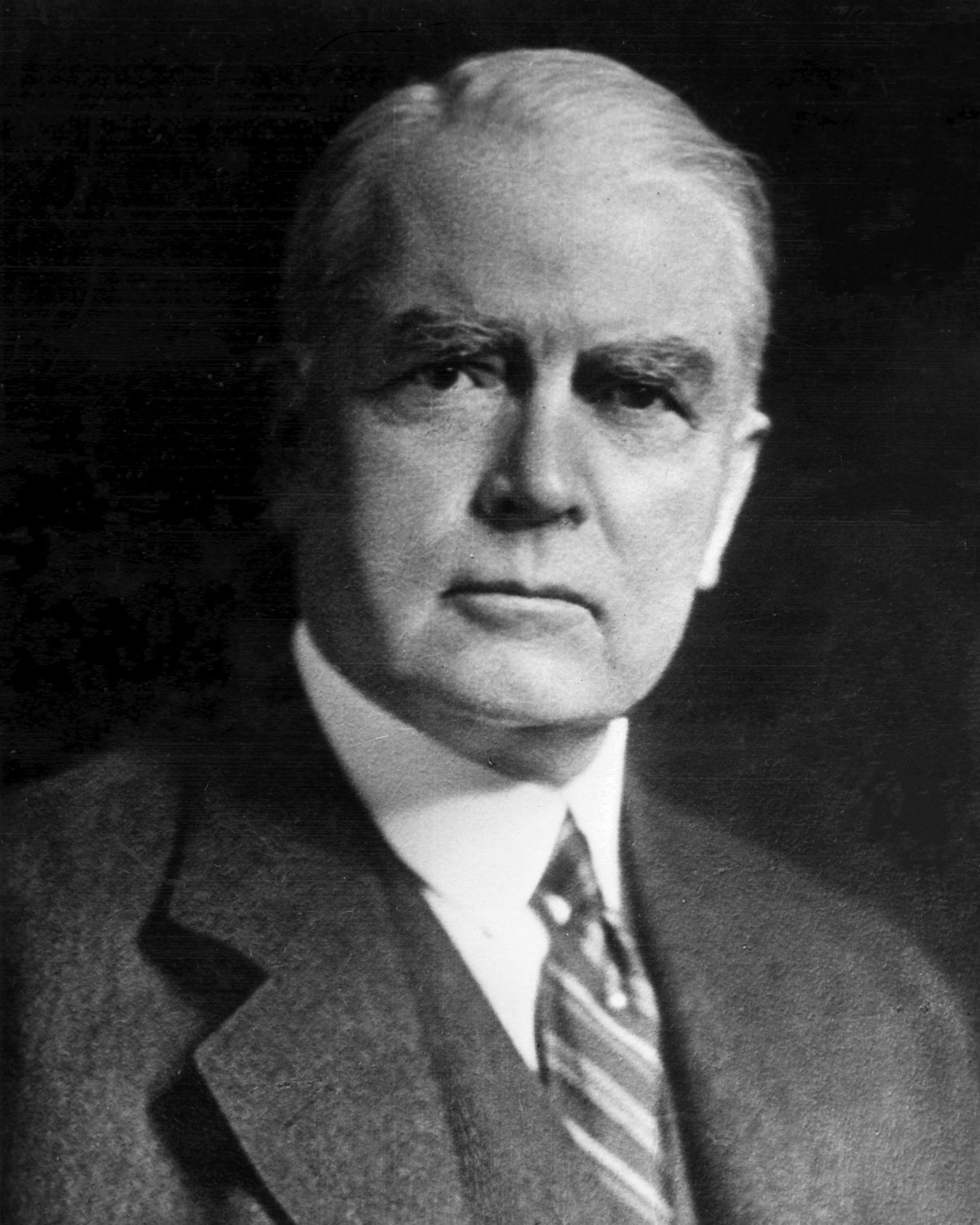
- Mott circa 1946
- Born: May 25, 1865; Livingston Manor, Sullivan County, New York, U.S.
- Died: January 31, 1955 (aged 89); Orlando, Florida, U.S.
- Burial place: Washington National Cathedral; 38°55′50″N 77°4′15″W
- Education: Upper Iowa University; Cornell University (B.A.)
- Occupation: Activist
- Organization(s): YMCA, World Student Christian Federation
- Spouse: Leila Ada White (m. 1891; died 1952)
- Parent(s): John Mott Sr. Elmira (Dodge) Mott
- Awards: Nobel Peace Prize (1946)

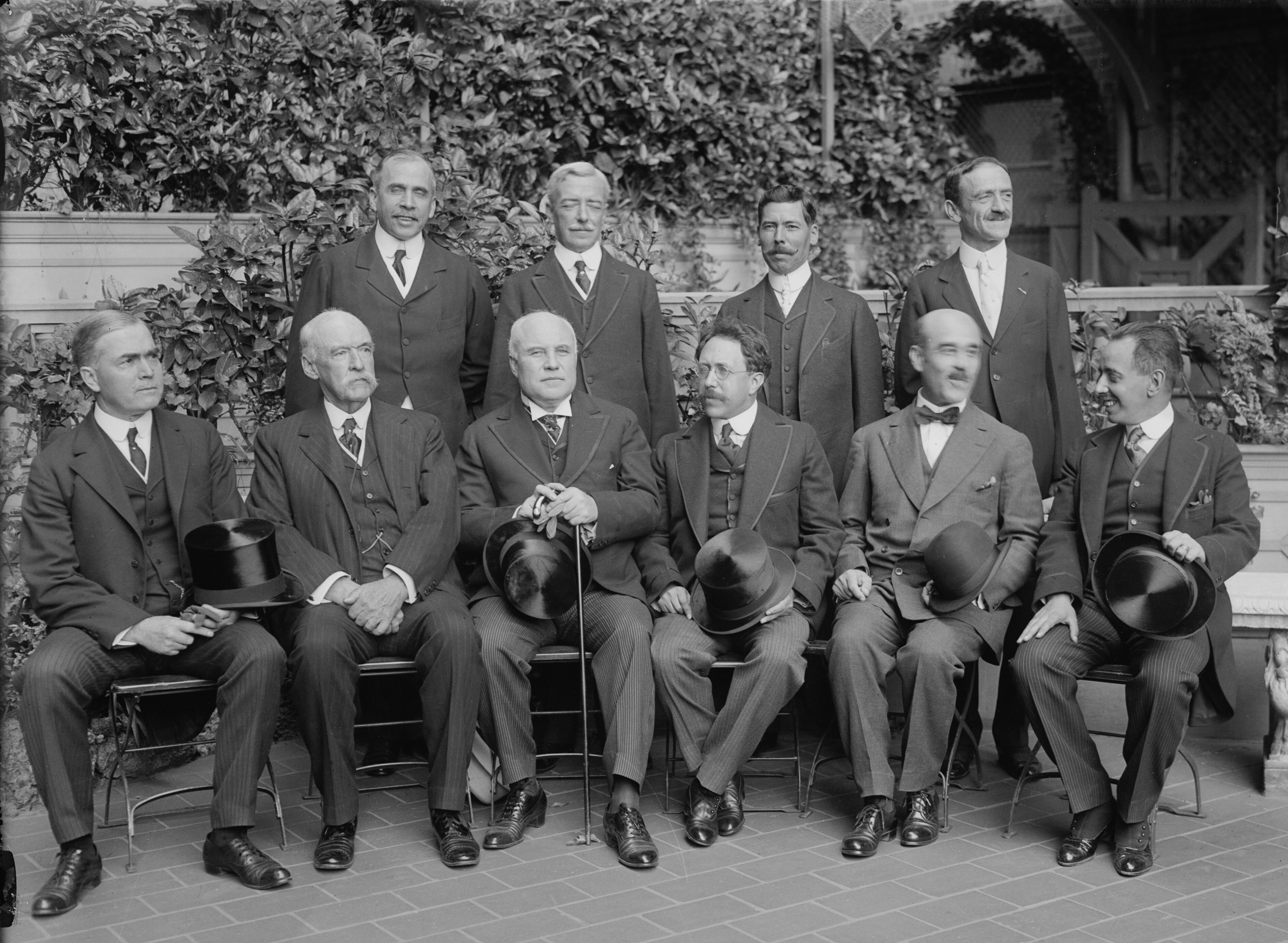
The United States - Mexico Commission. Standing from left to right are: Stephen Bonsal, Attache of the State Department and Advisor to the American Commission; American Secretary of State Robert Lansing; Eliseo Arredondo, the Mexican ambassador designate, and Leo Stanton Rowe, the Secretary to the American Commission. Sitting from left to right are John Mott of New York City; Judge George Gray of Wilmington, Delaware; Secretary of the Interior Franklin Knight Lane; Luis Cabrera Lobato, chairman of the Mexican delegation and Secretary of the Treasury of Mexico, Alberto J. Pani, President of the National Railways of Mexico; and Ignacio Bonillas, Minister of Communications and Public Works... The image was taken at the Biltmore Hotel in New York City on September 9, 1916.

John Raleigh Mott (May 25, 1865 – January 31, 1955) was an American evangelist and long-serving leader of the Young Men's Christian Association (YMCA) and the World Student Christian Federation (WSCF). He received the Nobel Peace Prize in 1946 for his work in establishing and strengthening international Protestant Christian student organizations that worked to promote peace. He shared the prize with Emily Greene Balch. From 1895 until 1920 Mott was the General Secretary of the WSCF. Intimately involved in the formation of the World Council of Churches in 1948, that body elected him as a lifelong honorary President. He helped found the World Student Christian Federation in 1895, the 1910 World Missionary Conference and the World Council of Churches in 1948. His best-known book, The Evangelization of the World in this Generation, became a missionary slogan in the early 20th century.

== Biography ==
Mott was born in Livingston Manor, Sullivan County, New York, on May 25, 1865, and his family moved to Postville, Iowa, in September of the same year. He attended Upper Iowa University, where he studied history and was an award-winning student debater. He transferred to Cornell University, where he received his bachelor's degree in 1888. He was influenced by Arthur Tappan Pierson one of the forces behind the Student Volunteer Movement for Foreign Missions, which was founded in 1886.

In 1910, Mott, an American Methodist layperson, presided at the 1910 World Missionary Conference, which was an important milestone in the modern Protestant missions movement and some say the modern ecumenical movement.

Mott and a colleague were offered free passage on the Titanic in 1912 by a White Star Line official who was interested in their work, but they declined and took the more humble liner the SS Lapland. According to a biography by C. Howard Hopkins, in New York City the two men heard what happened to the Titanic, looked at each other and remarked that, "The Good Lord must have more work for us to do."

After touring Europe and promoting ecumenism, Mott traveled to Asia where, from October 1912 to May 1913, he held a series of 18 regional and national conferences, including in Ceylon, India, Burma, Malaya, China, Korea and Japan.

He also worked with Robert Hallowell Gardiner III to maintain relations with the Russian Orthodox Church and Archbishop Tikhon after the Russian Revolution.

From 1920 until 1928, Mott served as the WSCF Chairperson. For his labors in both missions and ecumenism, as well as for peace, some historians consider him to be "the most widely traveled and universally trusted Christian leader of his time".

== Personal life and legacy ==
Mott married twice. His first wife was a teacher, Leila Ada White. They married in 1891 and had two sons and two daughters, Irene Mott Bose, a social worker in India, and wife of Indian Supreme Court justice Vivian Bose; Eleanor Mott Ross of Poughkeepsie, New York; John Livingstone Mott, who received the Kaisar-i‐Hind silver medal in 1931, for his work with the YMCA in India; Frederick Dodge Mott, who worked in healthcare planning in Canada, and was Canada's representative to the World Health Organization.

After Leila Mott died in 1952, Mott remarried in 1953, to Agnes Peter (1880-1957), a descendant of Martha Custis Washington. He died in 1955, in Orlando, Florida, aged 89 years and was buried in Washington National Cathedral. His papers are held at the Yale Divinity School Library.

== Veneration ==
In 2022, John Raleigh Mott was officially added to the Episcopal Church liturgical calendar with a feast day on October 3.

The high school of the Postville Community School District in Postville, Iowa, is named after him.

== Writings ==
- The Evangelization of the World in This Generation (1900)
- The Decisive Hour of Christian Missions (1910)
- World Student Christian Federation (1920)
- Cooperation and the World Mission (1935)
- Methodists United for Action (1939)
- The Larger Evangelism (1945)

== See also ==
- 1910 World Missionary Conference
- Christian ecumenism
- History of religion in the United States
- International student ministry
- List of peace activists
