= Vivian Bose =

Indian Supreme Court jurist

Acting Judge of Supreme Court of India
- In office 9 September 1957 – 30 September 1958
- Nominated by: S. R. Das
- Appointed by: Rajendra Prasad

Judge of Supreme Court of India
- In office 5 March 1951 – 8 June 1956
- Nominated by: H. J. Kania
- Appointed by: Rajendra Prasad

3rd Chief Justice of Nagpur High Court
- In office 20 February 1949 – 23 February 1951
- Appointed by: C. Rajagopalachari
- Preceded by: Frederick Louis Grille
- Succeeded by: B. P. Sinha

Judge of Nagpur High Court
- In office 9 January 1936 – 19 February 1949
- Appointed by: George V

Personal details
- Born: 9 June 1891 Ahmedabad
- Died: 29 November 1983 (aged 92)
- Spouse: Irene Mott Bose
- Parent: Mohun Bose (father) Bipin Krishna Bose (grandfather)
- Relatives: John Mott (father-in-law)

Justice Vivian Bose (also rendered V. V. N. Bose) (9 June 1891 – 29 November 1983) was a judge of the Supreme Court of India, who later (November 1957–November 1959) served as the national commissioner of the Bharat Scouts and Guides.

Scouting for Indian Boys was started by Justice Bose, Madan Mohan Malaviya, Hridayanath Kunzru, Annie Besant and George Arundale, in 1913.

== Career ==
He became Judge of Nagpur High Court on 9 January 1936 and later became its chief justice on 20 February 1949. He was elevated to Supreme Court of India on 5 March 1951.

Justice Bose was a member of the World Scout Committee of the World Organization of the Scout Movement from 1947 until 1949.

He was also the President of the International Commission of Jurists. Justice Bose is known for breaking new ground in law, the significance of which came to be realized in later years.

Lawyers occupy a specially privileged position in society and that thrusts great responsibilities on us (lawyers); at the same time it gives us immense opportunities to mold the life and thought of the Nation, not so much by talk though we can also be great talkers, beaten only by another class politicians and ministers, but by our life and example, by what we do in the courts of course, but also in spheres outside the range of bread and butter life.

The landmark judgement by Vivian Bose J in Virsa Singh v State of Punjab [1958 AIR 465] has set an important judicial precedent regarding the applicability of section 300 Thirdly of The Indian Penal Code of 1860.

After initially retiring in June 1956, he rejoined the Court under Article 128 of the Constitution. Over the course of his tenure on the Supreme Court, Bose authored 124 judgments and sat on 364 benches. He retired for a second time in September 1958.

He was married to Canadian Irene Mott, the author of The Monkey Tree on 18 December 1930. His father-in-law was John Mott, a Nobel Prize laureate.

Preceded by Dr. Hridyanath Kunzru	National Commissioners of the Bharat Scouts and Guides; 1957–1959	Succeeded by Professor Madan Mohan
