= Mangal Das Pakvasa =

- મંગળદાસ પક્વાસ
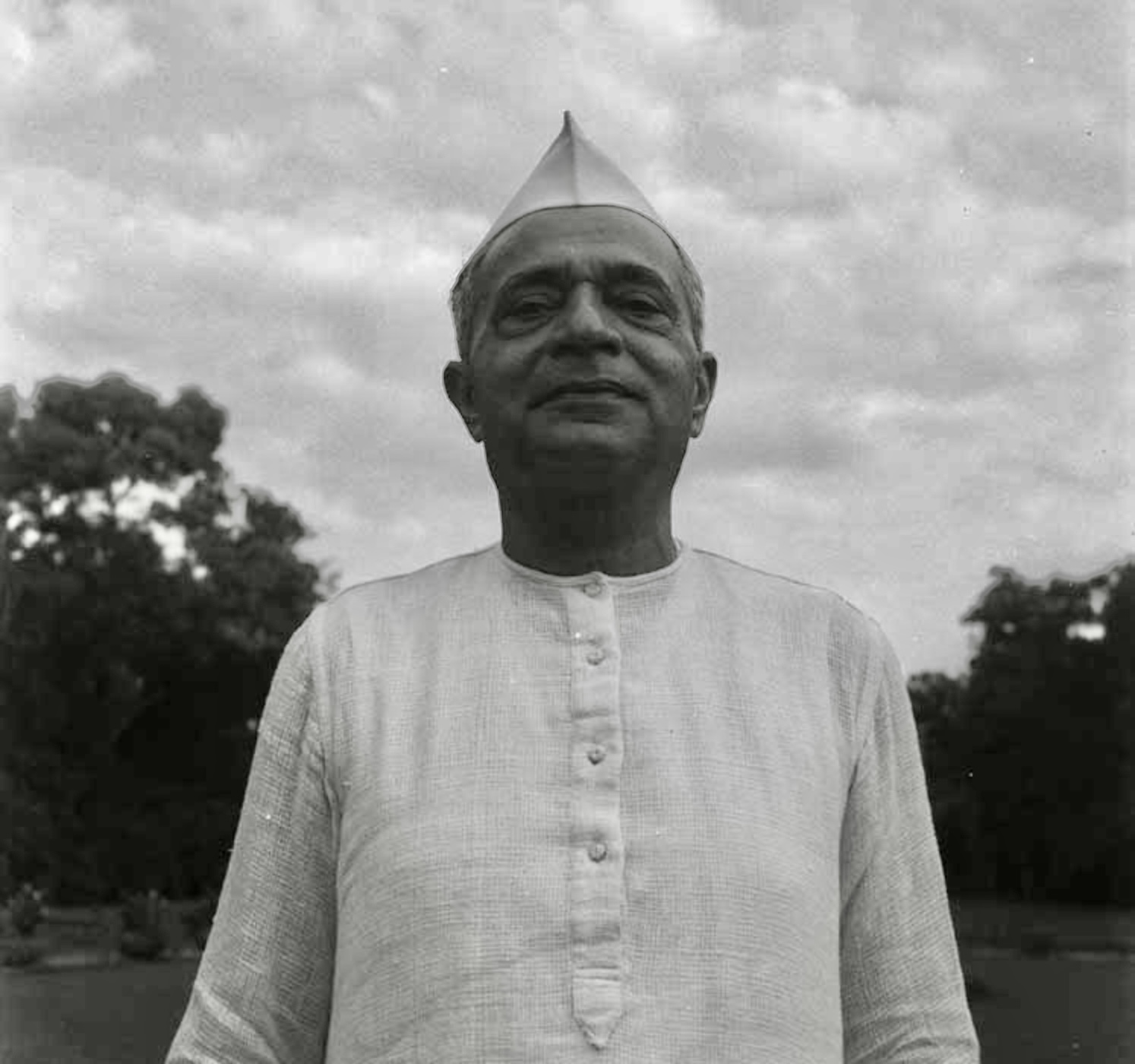
- Pakvasa in August 1947

First President of the Bharat Scouts and Guides
- In office 1953–1960
- Succeeded by: Ammu Swaminathan

Mangaldas M. Pakvasa (મંગળદાસ પક્વાસ; 7 May 1882 in Bombay – 6 November 1968) a freedom fighter and one of the first five Indian Governors, served as the first President of the Bharat Scouts and Guides from 1953 to November 1960.

In the first years after India's independence, leading politicians, including Jawaharlal Nehru, Maulana Abul Kalam Azad and Mangal Das Pakvasa, as well as Scout leaders tried to unify India's Scouts and Guides.

He was Governor of Madhya Pradesh, Bombay and Mysore, and a confidante of Mahatma Gandhi.

His daughter-in-law is Poornima Pakvasa, and his granddaughter is Sonal Mansingh.

Preceded by first incumbent	Presidents of the Bharat Scouts and Guides; 1953–1960	Succeeded by Ammu Swaminathan
