= H. N. Kunzru =

Indian politician (1887–1978)

Pandit H.N. Kunzru
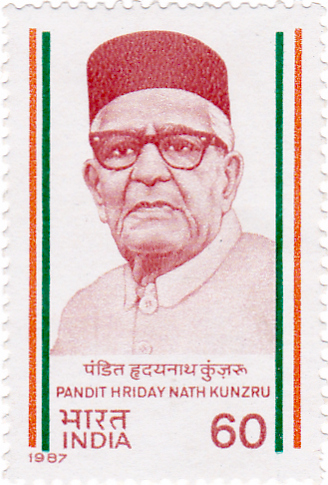

Member of Parliament, Rajya Sabha
- In office 1952–1964
- Prime Minister: Jawaharlal Nehru

President of Indian Council of World Affairs
- In office 1948–1975
- Preceded by: Tej Bahadur Sapru
- Succeeded by: Sardar Swaran Singh

President of Indian School of International Studies
- In office 1955–1970

1st chief National Commissioner of Bharat Scouts and Guides
- In office 1952–1957
- Preceded by: Position Established
- Succeeded by: Justice Vivian Bose

Personal details
- Born: October 1, 1887 Allahabad
- Died: Agra, Uttar Pradesh, India
- Party: Independent
- Other political affiliations: National Liberal Federation
- Spouse: Senapati Kunzru
- Education: Agra College, London School of Economics
- Occupation: liberation fighter, parliamentarian
- Awards: Bharat Ratna (1968) refused to accept

Hridya Nath Kunzru (1 October 1887 – 3 April 1978) was an Indian freedom fighter and a public figure. He was a long-time Parliamentarian, serving in various legislative bodies at the Provincial and Central level for nearly four decades. He was a member of the Constituent Assembly of India (1946–50) that drew up the Constitution of India. He was also keenly interested in international affairs and co-founded the Indian Council of World Affairs and the Indian School of International Studies.

== Early life and education ==
Kunzru was the second son of Kashmiri Pandit Ayodhya Nath Kunzru and his second wife Jankeshwari. He was born at Allahabad on 1 October 1887. Even though he got married in 1908, his wife died in 1911 during childbirth, followed by the death of the child six months later. This was a turning point in his life and he resolved to dedicate his life to public service. He did his matriculation in 1903 and F.A. in 1905 from Agra College. He passed his B.A. examination in 1907 from Allahabad University. Subsequently, he left for the London School of Economics in 1910, where he completed a BSc in political science.

== Political philosophy ==
Pandit Kunzru started his political career in the Congress, but left and formed the National Liberal Federation along with other moderates such as Tej Bahadur Sapru and Madan Mohan Malaviya. He became its president in 1934. The National Liberal Federation was a loose conglomeration of high-minded individuals and Kunzru remained true to that tradition, standing for his first election, and every election after, as an Independent candidate. He was also a founding member of the Akhil Bharatiya Hindu Mahasabha and member of the Executive Committee of the U.P. Hindu Sabha, in 1915.

His vigorous support of non-governmental organisations, was also linked to the liberal philosophy that government should not be all powerful in a democracy. Many of his interventions in the Constituent Assembly Debates were also to reduce the power of government over the people.

== Career highlights ==
=== As a parliamentarian ===
He became a member of the Legislative Council of the United Provinces (1921–26), and subsequently in the Central Legislative Assembly (1926–30), the Council of States (1936), the Provisional Parliament (1950–52) and the Rajya Sabha (1952–64).

Kunzru headed two expert committees set up to look into the Railways, the first established in 1944 to amalgamate the various railway companies the existing into the Indian Railways. He also chaired the Railway Accidents Committee set up in 1962. He was Chairman of the Committee established in 1946 that recommended the establishment of a cadet corps which ultimately took shape as the National Cadet Corps in 1948. He headed another Committee that recommended the establishment of the National Defence Academy. He was a member of the States Reorganisation Commission from 1953 to 1955. He was widely traveled and was part of Parliamentary and other delegations to many countries, including South Africa, the United States, Japan, and Pakistan. He also chaired the Pacific Conferences of 1950, 1954, and 1958 organised by the Institute of Pacific Relations.

=== As an educationist ===
Kunzru was instrumental in promoting the study of international relations in India. He helped set up the Indian Council of World Affairs and the Indian School of International Studies, using his influence and contacts to raise funds amounting to Rs. 600,000 to build Sapru House, the headquarters of the Indian Council of World Affairs. At various times, he was a member of the Senate and Executive Council of the Banaras Hindu University, the University of Delhi, Allahabad University, and the Sri Ram Institute, Delhi. In recognition of his work, he was conferred honorary degrees by many of these universities. He was a member of the University Grants Commission for 12 years from 1953 to 1966 and served as its chairman for a brief period in 1966.

=== Other accomplishments ===
He was one of the founders of Indian Scouting, and served as the first national commissioner of the Bharat Scouts and Guides. He joined the Servants of India Society, founded by Gopal Krishna Gokhale in 1909 and became its life President in 1936. He was also the first president of the Children's Film Society.

He was part of the preparatory Committee that established the India International Centre and one of its five original Life Trustees. He was also a part of the State Reorganisation Commission.

== Honours and awards ==
- Kunzru was nominated for the highest Indian civilian award, the Bharat Ratna, in 1968 but he declined, citing his opposition to such honours in a Republic, which he had first voiced during the Constituent Assembly debates.
- He was honored on a postage stamp of India in 1987.
- The Defence Affairs Study Centre established in Pune in 1972 under his patronage was renamed as the Kunzru Centre in 1980 after his death.
- The Indian School of International Studies began a series of annual lectures named after him, which continues to this day.
- His honorary degrees included LL.D. (from Allahabad University), D. Litt. (from Aligarh Muslim University), and D.L. (from Banaras Hindu University)

== Personal life ==
The novelist Hari Kunzru is Pandit Kunzru's great grand nephew.

Preceded by first incumbent	National Commissioners of the Bharat Scouts and Guides; 1952–1957	Succeeded by Justice Vivian Bose
Preceded by Professor Madan Mohan	National Commissioners of the Bharat Scouts and Guides; 1960–1964	Succeeded by Mrs. Lakhshmi Mazumdar
