= Sangam World Centre =

World Scout Centre in Maharasthra, India

Coordinates: 18°34′18″N 73°52′40″E

- Owner: WAGGGS
- Location: Mula River, Pune
- Country: India
- Founded: 1966
- Website http://www.sangamworldcentre.org/

Sangam World Centre is one of the five World Centres of the World Association of Girl Guides and Girl Scouts (WAGGGS), located on the banks of the Mula River in Pune.

The word Sangam means ‘coming together’ in the ancient language of Sanskrit. The centre serves as a place for Girl Guides and Girl Scouts around the world to come together to share their experiences, as well as the culture and traditions of their homelands and Member Organizations.

Four other WAGGGS World Centers are Our Chalet in Switzerland, Our Cabaña in Mexico, Pax Lodge in England, and Kusafiri in Africa.

== Location ==
The Sangam World Centre is situated 190 km (120 mi) from Mumbai, in the state of Maharashtra, India.

== History ==
Sangam was first imagined at the 1956 WAGGGS International Commissioners’ meeting in New Delhi, where the idea to build a World Centre in the Asia Pacific Region was proposed.

A year later, at the World Conference, the decision to build the new Centre in India was finalized, thanks to the work of Lakhshmi Mazumdar, the National Commissioner of the Indian WAGGGS Member Organization Bharat Scouts and Guides, and the state of Maharashtra's donation of 7¾ acres of land to be used as the World Centre's site. The city of Pune, located in the state of Maharashtra in India, was selected because of its climate, cultural history, tradition in education, and proximity to Bombay (now Mumbai).

In 1963, the building plans were approved at the World Conference in Denmark. Girl Guides and Girl Scouts around the world raised over 50 per cent of the construction funds, and the foundation stone was laid in 1964.

The center was designed by the Bombay architectural firm Messrs Mody and Colgan and the construction was supervised by Mrs. Lakhshmi Mazumdar, the National Commissioner of the Indian WAGGGS Member Organization Bharat Scouts and Guides. On 16 October 1966, the World Chief Guide, Lady Olave Baden-Powell, inaugurated the center.

== Influential women ==
=== Lakshmi Mazumdar ===
As head of the Sangam Planning Committee, Mazumdar secured a promise of land and funding from the government of Maharashtra. She was the first woman to have served as the National Commissioner of the Bharat Scouts and Guides. She was also the first Chairman of the Sangam Committee. Mazumdar received the Padma Shri (4th highest award in India) in 1965 and was awarded the Bronze Wolf from the World Scout Committee.

=== Anu Karkare ===
Karkare was the first Guider-in-Charge at Sangam. She presided over every Welcome Ceremony until she was no longer able to. She is known at Sangam for her words: "I expect to pass through this world but once; any good thing, therefore, that I can do, or any kindness that I can show to any fellow creature, let me do it now; let me not defer or neglect it, for I shall not pass this way again."

=== Armaity Dastur ===
She was instrumental in forming the Friends of Sangam Mumbai group, and sat on the managing committee. She has also been a member of the Sangam Committee and Centre Team. She was also a District Commissioner for Bharat Scouts and Guides and enjoyed Girl Guiding throughout her life and was of great assistance to Sangam in forging connections with National Bharat Scouts and Guides

=== Tehmina Barma ===
Supporter of Sangam from the beginning. She held a position of vice-president of the Pune Bharat Scouts and Guides. She was also Sangam Committee Chairman from 1973 to 1978, and "Chief Guest" at the 20th birthday.

== Involvement in the Community ==
From 1973 onwards, community development began to feature strongly in the programmes. The Phulenagar Service Project, based opposite Sangam, was set up to organise activities. It became the root of future projects featuring training for local women, adolescent girls and children. Children's holidays were soon a regular feature of the event schedule. Many projects in the Pune area have been, and continue to be, assisted by Sangam's staff, participants and friends.

Over the years, as Sangam grew so did the opportunity to lend a hand to other organisations. The centre started to work closely with other new community partners in Pune. Participants started to visit and share the work of partners. Then Sangam started to work together with partners on projects. The partnerships still exist today and Sangam continues to work with and support many organisations. Today, all participants visit at least one community partner during their event.

== Events ==
Sangam offers five kinds of international events: Leadership, Cultural, Celebratory, Wellness and World Bureau-Led events. Each provides the opportunity to explore India's exciting culture and traditions and interact with Sangam's community partner organisations.

== Volunteering at Sangam ==
Sangam World Centre offers long-term experiences, such as volunteering programmes, as an opportunity for self-development and the chance to live abroad, gain personal and professional experience, work in a multicultural environment, and enjoy the friendship and fun of international guiding and scouting.

=== Sangam Volunteer ===
Sangam Volunteers are responsible for the delivery of Sangam's international events. They run sessions on Indian culture and the latest WAGGGS developments, and lead tours around the local neighbourhood and Pune city centre.

=== Intern ===
Sangam interns bring their ideas and talents to Sangam and contribute to the management and development of the World Centre.

Interns at Sangam have the opportunity to explore Indian culture, experience international girl guiding and girl scouting, and develop personal and professional abilities. They will also develop skills in all areas at Sangam.

=== Community Programme ===
Since 1966, Sangam World Centre has partnered with a variety of non-governmental organizations striving to better the lives of people in Pune. Today, Sangam is affiliated with more than twenty organizations, which work in a number of fields: medicine, education, environmental sustainability, women's empowerment, and more.

During events, participants visit Sangam's Community Partners, and are given the chance to witness community leadership and advocacy in action, while participating in dialogue with the partner organizations and the children, women, and men they assist. These connections often result in partnerships between event participants and Community Partners, helping to build the capacity of these organizations.

== Friends of Sangam ==
A special donor group is set up for supporters of Sangam. Their donations ensure that girls from around the world can access and enjoy self-development, learning and adventure at Sangam. It is open to any individual who donates £40 or more. Friends of Sangam provide funding for Sangam's programs, activities and work with girls, receive news and information on projects and campaigns, and a pin and certificate.
