= Chief Scout (Scouting Ireland) =

Leader of Scouting Ireland

The Chief Scout is the leader of Scouting Ireland. As Chairperson of the National Council and National Management Committee the Chief Scout is responsible for co-ordinating the activities of the Association with the help of the National Team for Policy Implementation and Co-ordination. The role is a volunteer one, normally elected every third year at National Council, and works with the CEO, the head of the professional staff function of the association.

The first Chief Scout elected was Martin Burbridge, a former member of Scouting Ireland (CSI). He stepped down in September 2008, and four others have held the role since then.

== Term of office ==
The Chief Scout, is elected by secret ballot at the Annual General Meeting, for a term of three years. The Chief Scout may be re-elected for one further term of three years.

== Roles ==
The key roles of the Chief Scout are:

- President of the Association
- Chairperson of the general meetings and conferences
- Member and Director of the Scout Foundation

Among the responsibilities of the Chief Scout are the presentation of Chief Scout Awards to Scouts and the investiture of Scouters into the Order of CúChulainn. Under ONE Programme, the Chief Scout will share presentation of the Chief Scout Award for Rover Scouts with the President of Ireland, as the award is linked to Gaisce – The President's Award.

== Chief Scouts ==
=== Martin Burbridge (2004–2008) ===
Martin Burbridge is a native of County Kildare and is a qualified accountant. He holds the Wood Badge and is a member of the Order of Cú Chulainn. Burbridge had previously been the National Treasurer of Scouting Ireland (CSI) and one of those involved in the formation of Scouting Ireland. Burbridge became Chief of the Interim National Management Committee and, at the first National Council in The Helix in 2004, his position as Chief Scout was confirmed.

Initiatives undertaken during his term included the adoption of a new uniform, a new administrative structure and a programme review. New 'Province' and 'County' structures and an administrative "reshuffle" followed. Changes during his time in office included the transition from two associations to one, operating in 32 counties and catering for almost 40,000 members, as well as increased youth membership and youth participation. Among the early criticisms of his term was a lack of communication relating to the Castle Saunderson project, which was later resolved. He was re-elected unopposed in June 2007 and was expected to serve a second and final term of 3 years until 2010. However, in a letter to the National Management Committee of Scouting Ireland dated 12 August 2008, Burbridge announced his decision to resign as Chief Scout "effective [..] midnight on Sunday 28 September 2008".

=== Michael John Shinnick (2008–2015) ===
Due to the resignation of Martin Burbridge the National Management Committee appointed Michael John Shinnick, the then Chief Commissioner for Adult Resources, as Scouting Ireland's second Chief Scout in September 2008. He was elected by National Council in March 2009 and re-elected in 2012 for a term to end in 2015.

=== Christy McCann (2015–2021) ===
An election for Chief Scout was scheduled for National Council on 18 April. There were two candidates nominated, Seán Farrell, National Secretary and former Ordinary Member of the National Management Committee (NMC), and Kiernan Gildea, former Chief Commissioner (Youth Programme) and Interim Dublin Metropolitan Provincial Commissioner. Gildea withdrew from the race on 17 April, and a yes/no referendum on Farrell was lost. The NMC scheduled an Emergency National Council for September 2015 to elect a successor.

International Commissioner and former North Eastern Provincial Commissioner, Christy McCann, was elected as Scouting Ireland's third Chief Scout in September 2015 for a term to end in 2018. Four candidates in total took part in the election. Seán Farrell was again nominated along with McCann and two former ordinary members of the National Management Committee Ollie Kehoe and Pat O'Connor. Voting was by single transferable vote. McCann was elected unopposed for a second term in April 2018, serving until February 2021.

The National Management Committee brought restructuring proposals to National Council in 2018. As part of these plans, each individual on the NMC agreed to resign as a director, effective 31 October, so as to allow for the election of a new 10 person Board of directors, to come into office on 1 November, and the Chief Scout would no longer be a director, pending approval from extraordinary National Councils in June and October.

=== Jill Pitcher Farrell (2021–2024) ===
Rover Scout and Sea Scout Jill Pitcher Farrell was elected as Chief Scout in May 2021. She is Scouting Ireland's first female Chief Scout, and the first youth member to serve in the role.

=== Eoin Callanan (2024 onwards) ===
Eoin Callanan was elected unopposed to replace Pitcher Farrell in September 2024.

== See also ==
- Scouting Ireland (CSI) Chief Scouts
- Scouting Ireland S.A.I. Chief Scouts
