= Order of CúChulainn =

- Owner: Scouting Ireland
- Founded: 2004

The Order of CúChulainn is the highest award for adults in Scouting Ireland.

== History ==
It was introduced in 2004 to replace Scouting Ireland (CSI)'s Silver Wolfhound and the equivalent award of Scouting Ireland S.A.I., the Silver Elk. In the early years of Scouting in Ireland, key figures were awarded the Silver Wolf by the Scout Association including Reginald Brabazon, 12th Earl of Meath, Mervyn Wingfield, 8th Viscount Powerscourt and Hans Hamilton, 2nd Baron HolmPatrick.

The first awards were presented at Larch Hill with all those who held the highest award of the previous associations being invested as Honorary Members of the Order of CúChulainn by Martin Burbridge, the Chief Scout.

== Origin of the name ==
In Irish mythology, Cúchulainn ('Hound of Culann') is the pre-eminent hero of Ulster in the Ulster Cycle. The image of Cúchulainn is invoked by both Irish Nationalists and Ulster Unionists, in murals, poetry, literature and other art forms.

== Requirements ==
The Award is presented for outstanding commitment to Scouting over many years. Investiture into the Order is only made at functions with an appropriate level of importance. It is presented by the Chief Scout except in circumstances whereby they are unable to attend and another appropriate presenter is chosen.

== Insignia ==
=== Order pendant ===
Members of the Order wear a yellow and red ribbon around the neck from which a miniature replica of a hound hangs, along with the World Crest. It is one of only four items which may be worn around the neck by members of Scouting Ireland, the others being the Lanyard, the Wood Badge and most commonly, the Neckerchief.

=== Citation ===
Each member receives a certificate, on which there is a citation which details the Scouting career of the recipient and reasons why he/she has been deemed to have made an exceptional contribution to the provision of Scouting in Ireland. The citation is read formally before the presentation is made.

The Order of Cúchulainn pin on Award Ribbon along with Service and Meritorious pins

=== Order pin ===
An Order of CuChulainn pin may be worn on the adult award ribbon. The pin consists of a hound, identical to that on the pendant.

== Similar awards ==
The Boy Scouts of America Silver Buffalo Award is an international equivalent award to the Order of CúChulainn. The Scout association (UK) awards the Silver Wolf, which was awarded to a number of figures from Ireland prior to Irish independence but has also been awarded since, such as in the case of the award to Michael Webb in 1985. Scouts Australia awards the Silver Kangaroo.

The World Organization of the Scout Movement awards the Bronze Wolf.
