= History of Sea Scouting (Scouting Ireland) =

Sea Scouting (Irish: Gasógaíacht Mhara) has existed in Scouting Ireland and its predecessor associations since 1912. Sea Scout Groups are members of the World Organization of the Scout Movement (WOSM) through their membership of Scouting Ireland. Sea Scouting provides Scout training with and through water-borne activities.

== Timeline ==
- 1908: 1st Dublin Troop, Boy Scouts (Ringsend).
- 1912: Ringsend and Bray Sea Scouts registered.
- 1914: Wood-Latimer Cup – Rowing.
- 1915: Port of Dublin Sea Scout Local Association.
- 1918: Fry Cup – Seamanship.
- 1928: CBSI started Sea Scouting based on US model.
- 1960s-70s: Rapid growth of Sea Scouting in SAI.
- 1970s: Sea Scouting disappeared in CBSI.
- 1970: L.S. Albatross goes on station in Dún Laoghaire Harbour.
- 1976: The “BP 18” was designed as the SAI standard Sea Scout vessel for rowing and sailing.
- 1980s: CBSI decided not to re-establish Sea Scouting, but introduced a new water activities programme which could be used within any Scout Troop. SAI Sea Scouting continued to evolve.
- 1980: CBSI formed the National Water Activities Centre and decided on the Dutch Lelievlet as the standard rowing and sailing boat.
- 1982: International Sea Scout camp in Lough Dan.
- 1996: International Sea Scoup camp in Lisnaskea, County Fermanagh.
- 2002: SAI Sea Scouting Renewed Approach to Programme (RAP) completed.
- 2004: Merger of CSI and SAI to form Scouting Ireland.
- 2008: Hosted Eurosea 9 Conference in Larch Hill.
- 2004 – 2010: ONE Programme development as a Renewed Approach to Programme (RAP) as well the need to interoperate within the new (to CSI) Sea Scout programme brought in from the SAI forced a renewed look at how the NWAC and the Sea Scouts approached Water Activities and the Sea Scouting.

== Today ==
Following the merger in 2004 of Scouting Ireland S.A.I. and Scouting Ireland (CSI), to form Scouting Ireland, a lengthy programme review process commenced to review every aspect of youth programme delivered by Scouting Ireland. As a result of this process, it was decided that youth members should experience one youth programme from age 6 to age 21. As a result, Sea Scout Groups will now deliver a Sea Scout programme to all their youth members, in all age ranges.

== Sources ==
- Sea Scouting in Scouting Ireland - 2004 (Scouting Ireland)
