= Scouting and Guiding in Eswatini =

Scouting and Guiding movement in Eswatini

The Scout and Guide movement in Eswatini (Swaziland) is served by

- Eswatini Scout Association (formerly "Emavulandlela Swaziland Scout Association" and "Swaziland Boy Scouts Association"), member of the World Organization of the Scout Movement
- Eswatini Girl Guides Association (formerly "Swaziland Girl Guides Association"), member of the World Association of Girl Guides and Girl Scouts

== International Scouting units in Eswatini ==
In addition, there are American Boy Scouts in Eswatini, serving as Lone Scouts linked to the Direct Service branch of the Boy Scouts of America, which supports units around the world.
