= Scouting and Guiding in Lesotho =

Scouting and Guiding associations in Lesotho

The Scout and Guide movement in Lesotho is served by

- Lesotho Girl Guides Association, member of the World Association of Girl Guides and Girl Scouts
- Lesotho Scout Association, member of the World Organization of the Scout Movement

== International Scouting units in Lesotho ==
In addition, there are American Boy Scouts in Lesotho, serving as Lone Scouts linked to the Direct Service branch of the Boy Scouts of America, which supports units around the world.
