= Richard P. Fortune =

Captain Richard Percival Fortune
- Allegiance: Ireland
- Branch: Royal Naval Volunteer Reserve, Royal Navy Motor Boat Reserve
- Service years: 1915-1919
- Rank: Captain
- Commands: ML580
- Other work: Founder of the Scouter movement in Ireland

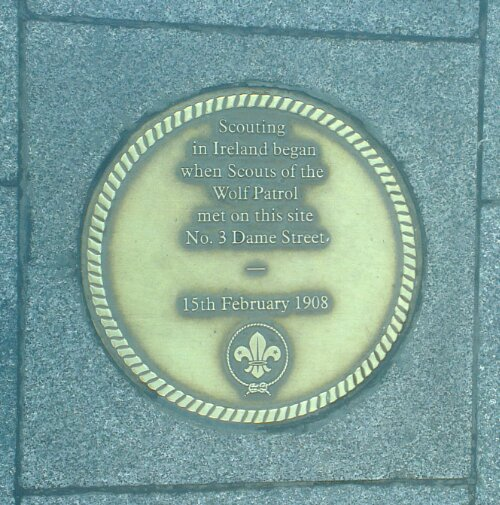
Plaque at 3 Dame Street, Dublin which marks the site of the first Scout meeting in Ireland. .

Captain Richard Percival Fortune RNVR (born 1878) was the founder of the Scouting movement in Ireland. Fortune hosted the first Boy Scout patrol meeting at his home at 3 Dame Street, Dublin in 1908. One of four children born to boarding house keeper Elizabeth Fortune, his time as a mariner ensured early Scouting activities afloat.

His troop quickly took to water activities, and it appears his troop evolved into the 1st Port of Dublin Sea Scout Group as part of the Port of Dublin Sea Scout Association. The 1st Port group received training from the Coastguard at Ringsend.

The London Gazette of 23 March 1915 shows Fortune was granted a temporary service commission as a Sub-Lieutenant in the Royal Naval Volunteer Reserve on 16 March 1915. He was subsequently promoted to Lieutenant in March 1916 while in command of ML580, the highest numbered of the World War I motor launches, a 37 tonne vessel with a crew of 8. During World War I, he served as part of the Royal Navy Motor Boat Reserve, aboard HMS Thalia, a Juno-class wooden screw corvette used as a base ship from 1915 and in command of various motor launches in the period directly after the war. Fortune's Royal Naval Volunteer service card shows he was demobilised from 31 December 1919, having been earlier had orders cancelled and leave granted to sit for examination as a merchant Master. His service record notes Fortune as "Scout Master, in charge of Sea Scouts of Spec. Serv Squad."

His son was Captain Desmond Fortune, the founder of the Irish Institute of Master Mariners, in whose name the annual senior seamanship competition for Scouting Ireland is awarded.

== Growth of Scouting ==
Fortune's troop registered in 1908 as a member of the Dublin City Boy Scouts Association and in 1912 as a member of the Port of Dublin Sea Scout Association. In 1921, the signing of the Anglo-Irish Treaty established the Irish Free State. At this time, the name of Irish Free State Scout Council was adopted, as the association expanded its reach outside of the greater Dublin area, becoming a national organisation. The name of the association was changed again with the foundation of the Republic of Ireland. Taking on the title of the Boy Scouts of Ireland. At this time, the association also gained the recognition of the World Organization of the Scout Movement (WOSM) becoming Ireland's only officially recognised Scout association.

In 1927, the Catholic Boy Scouts of Ireland (CBSI) was formed under the guidance of the Catholic Church as a means of imprinting a Catholic ethos on the young men of Ireland. Originating with Fr. Ernest Farrell, a curate in Greystones, County Wicklow in 1925/1926, the association was hastened in its initiation by his brother Fr. Tom Farrell, a curate in the Pro-Cathedral.

The association continued to work through the 1950s and 60's during which it adapted to the development of Ireland as an independent republic. In 1965, the SAI formed the Federation of Irish Scout Associations (FISA) with the CBSI. This enabled the two associations and their members the recognition and resources of WOSM. All Scouts in Ireland were thus able to play an active role in International Scouting.

Developments following the late 60's saw the association take on the name of the Scout Association of Ireland. This was subsequently changed to Scouting Ireland (SAI) in advance of the merging of the association with the CBSI. From 1 January 2004, both the SAI and the CSI ceased operations. Scouting in Ireland from this point forward would be overseen by the unified Scouting Ireland.

== First Scout meeting in Ireland ==
The first recorded Scout meeting took place at Fortune's home at 3 Dame Street, Dublin on 15 February 1908 where four boys were enrolled in the Wolf Patrol of the 1st Dublin Troop. Fortune's 1st Dublin Troop would go on to become the first group to register as part of the Port of Dublin Sea Scout Association in 1912, becoming 1st Port of Dublin Sea Scouts (Ringsend). A plaque marks the location of the house, now demolished, on the plaza next to Dublin’s City Hall. The 2nd Dublin formed the following week at 5 Upper Camden Street.
