= Édouard Duvigneaud =

National Commissioner of the Dutch-speaking Vlaamsch Verbond der Katholieke Scouts
- In office 1956–?

Edouard Duvigneaud of Belgium was the National Commissioner of the Dutch-speaking Vlaamsch Verbond der Katholieke Scouts from 1956 and as a member of the World Scout Committee.

Duvigneaud performed the closing ceremony of the 1977 Irish Scout Jamboree.
