= Irish Scout Jamboree =

Irish large-scale youth event

Scouting in Ireland has hosted many jamborees and jamborettes since Scouting started there in 1908.

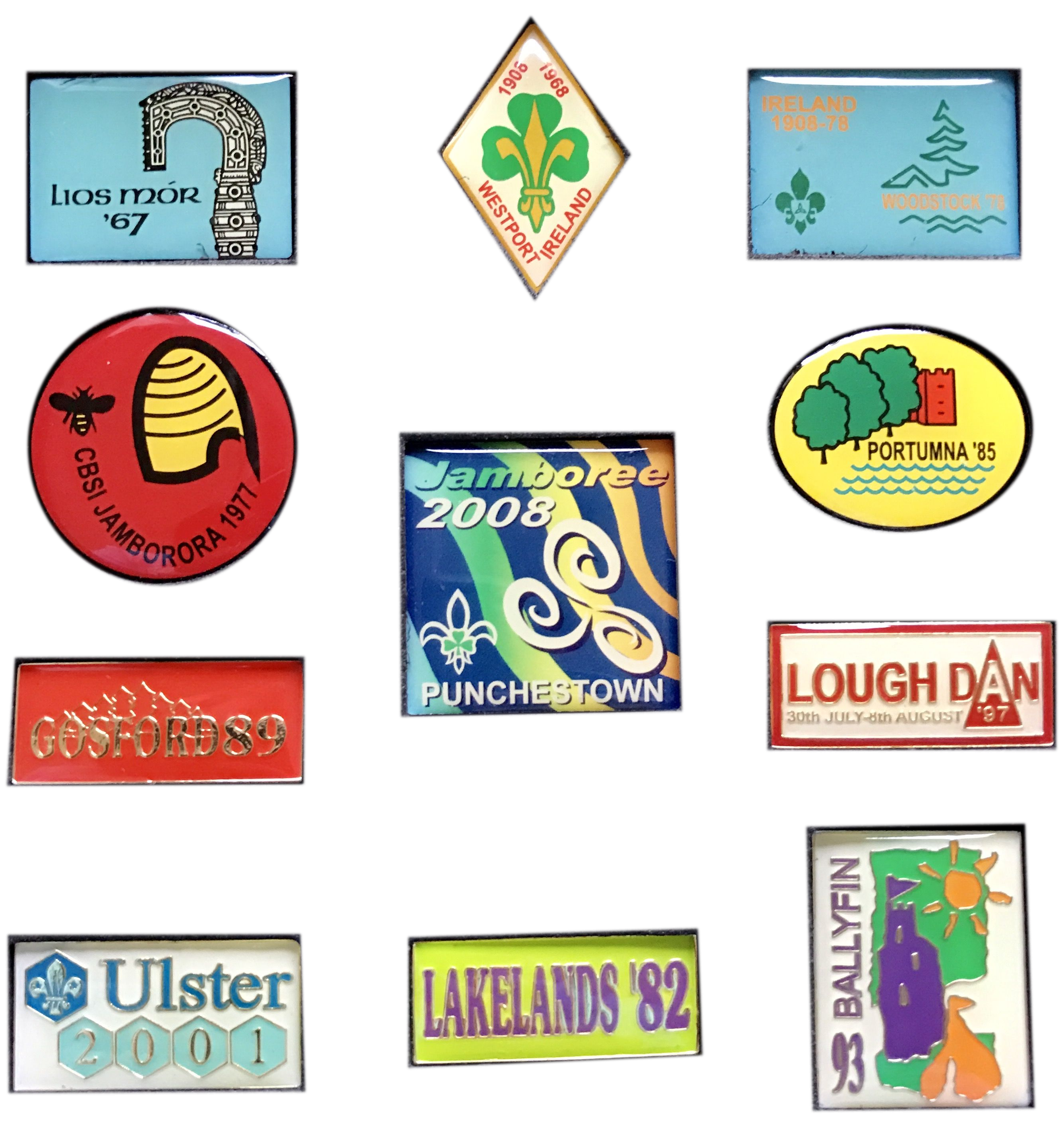
Emblems used for previous Irish Scout Jamborees

== List ==
Year	Jamboree	Location	Dates	Camp Chief	Attendance	Notes
1948	Listowel Jamborette	County Kerry	28 July – 10 August	Michael Kennelly	500	The first Catholic Boy Scouts of Ireland Jamborette with Scouts from Ireland, England, France, Austria, Belgium, Czechoslovakia and Italy attending.
1960	Loc Rynn (Loc Rinn)	Mohill, County Leitrim			850	Boy Scouts of Ireland's 1st Irish International Scout Camp. It was featured on RTÉ. Scouts from Austria, Belgium, Denmark, England, Scotland, France, Germany, the US, Switzerland, and Iceland attended.
1967	Lios Mór	County Waterford	18–29 July	James D. Hally	3,000	To mark the 40th anniversary of the establishment of the Catholic Boy Scouts of Ireland this national camp was held on the banks of the Blackwater river. The camp was visited by the Taoiseach Jack Lynch and Liam Cosgrave.
1968	Westport	County Mayo	30 July – 9 August			The Boy Scouts of Ireland celebrated their Diamond jubilee.
1977	Jamborora	Mount Melleray, County Waterford	26 July – 4 August		12,000 to 20,000	Celebrating the Golden jubilee of the Catholic Boy Scouts of Ireland. Scouts from Ireland, Italy, Norway, France and the US attended the camp. The Girl Guides were also represented. The theme for the camp was Irish history, with the subcamps being named after seven Irish kingdoms: Aileach, Caiseal, Cruachan, Dal Riada, Deise, Eamhain Macha, and Tara. The Chieftains and Horslips played at the camp, and the closing ceremony was performed by Edouard Duvigneaud of the World Scout Committee.
1978	Woodstock Estate	Inistioge, County Kilkenny	1–10 August		5,500	Marking 70 years of Scouting in Ireland, the Scout Association of Ireland celebrated with Scouts from 20 different countries. President Patrick Hillery opened the Jamboree.
1982	Lakelands	County Fermanagh				This was the largest Scouting event to be hosted by Fermanagh Scouts.
1985	Portumna	County Galway	30 July – 8 August		10,000	To celebrate International Youth Year the Scout Association of Ireland hosted the event with help from the Catholic Boy Scouts of Ireland, and the Scout Association of Northern Ireland. President Patrick Hillery opened the jamboree and 23 different countries were represented. Torrential rain fell during the summer which accounted for extremely muddy conditions. (See also Portumna § Jamboree.)
1989	Gosford	County Armagh	25 July – 4 August	Wilson Lambe	3,000	The Scout Association of Northern Ireland hosted this jamboree with help from the Catholic Boy Scouts of Ireland and the Scout Association of Ireland. 24 countries were represented including Japan, Canada and the US. The Duke of Kent visited the site.
1993	Ballyfin	County Laois	27 July – 5 August	Kiernan Gildea	7,000	Scouting Ireland CSI hosted this jamboree with help from the Scout Association of Ireland and Scout Association of Northern Ireland. Scouts from Ireland, Australia, Canada and 15 European countries attended. Officially opened by President Mary Robinson with Patrick Mayhew.
1997	Lough Dan	County Wicklow			2,000	Scouting Ireland SAI hosted jamboree at their national campsite. It was the last to be supported by both the Catholic Boy Scouts of Ireland, and the Scout Association of Northern Ireland, each taking it in turns to organise one of the previous 3 events. (See also Lough Dan § Scouting Jamboree.)
2008	Jamboree 2008	Punchestown, County Kildare	2–10 August	Christy McCann	12,500	Scouting Ireland's first international Jamboree, celebrating 100 years of Scouting in Ireland. Scouts from Ireland, Canada, the US, Europe, Asia and Australia attended. The jamboree was curtailed due to adverse weather conditions on 9 August, and no closing ceremony was held.
2018	JamboRí 2018	Stradbally, County Laois	25 July – 2 August	Kiernan Gildea	4,000	Scouting Ireland's second international Jamboree. Scouts from Ireland, Canada, the US, Europe, Asia and Australia attended.

== Cancelled jamborees ==
- 2001: Causeway 2001 was planned by The Scout Association to be held in County Antrim. It was cancelled due to the 2001 outbreak of foot-and-mouth disease after extensive preparations took place.
- 2013: Scouting Ireland's second jamboree was planned for 2013 in Stradbally Hall, home of the Electric Picnic music festival, in Stradbally County Laois. Deirdre Butler was the Camp Chief and in April 2013 Jamboree 2013 was cancelled due to lack of bookings.

== Ballyfin '93 ==
Ballyfin '93 took place in the grounds of Ballyfin College, County Laois, between 27 July and 5 August 1993. It was hosted by the Catholic Boy Scouts of Ireland, with the support and assistance of Scouting Ireland SAI and the Scout Association in Northern Ireland (a branch of the Scout Association in the UK). It was the third of four such jamborees rotated among the three Scout Associations in Ireland. Portumna '85, and Gosford '89 preceded it, while it was followed by Lough Dan '97. The jamboree song "The Spirit Lives On" was a version of that used for the 15th World Scout Jamboree in Canada in 1983. The campsite was split into seven subcamps for Scout Troops, Cub Scouts and staff, each named after an Irish Lake/Lough. One of the highlights of the jamboree was a charity fundraising day in aid of UNICEF. As it took place on visitors' day, troops and staff set up stalls to raise money by selling items of food, or with novelty competitions.

== Jamboree 2008 ==
Jamboree 2008 Logo

Jamboree 2008 was Scouting Ireland's first international Jamboree that was held from 2–10 August 2008. It took place on the grounds of the Punchestown Racecourse, County Kildare. The aim of the Jamboree was to celebrate one hundred years of Scouting in Ireland. Over 12,000 Irish and overseas Scouts attended. The camp chief for Jamboree 2008 was Christy McCann. Punchestown Racecourse was chosen to host the Jamboree, having previously hosted the Creamfields, Witnness and Oxegen music festivals, and as such has often been used as a campsite for large numbers, however never for a duration of 10 days.

The Camp Chief Christy McCann arrived in a coast guard helicopter to open the jamboree and flags of the attending countries were raised. The ceremony finished with a fireworks display.

The campsite was split into a total of nine subcamps; six of these subcamps were for attending Scout groups and Cub/Macaoimh packs and one each for Venture groups, families of staff and Staff members. Each subcamp is named after Irish geographical or heritage sites. The Jamboree had its very own radio station, called "Jam FM". The station broadcast on 95.9 FM and online to Local Kildare and west Wicklow areas via Three Rock Mountain. The format of the station was mainly commercial pop/rock and indie and with some talk.

The Camp Chief Challenge involved completing activities in order to collect enough points for the Camp Chief Challenge Pin. Tasks ranged from getting the Camp Chief's signature or attending a Scouts' Own to have a meal with another troop/pack/unit.

The Beaver and visitors day's were canceled due to torrential rain and flooding. The Jamboree was eventually curtailed due to the adverse weather conditions on 9 August, and no closing ceremony was held. Subcamps were evacuated at speed, with many foreign or long distance troop being forced to shelter in the Punchestown Racecourse bar.

A full set of Jamboree 2008 Subcamp badges accompanied by a full set of Subcamp pins forming a diamond

The six elements logos that were placed all over the Jamboree 2008 campsite and were printed on staff T-shirts

Jamboree 2008 Camp Chief Challenge Pin

== JamboRí '18 ==
JamboRí '18 took place from 25 July to 2 August at Stradbally Hall near Portlaoise in the midlands of Ireland. In 2014, Scouting Ireland's National Management Committee announced the intention to hold a jamboree in 2018, in preparation for hosting the World Scout Moot in 2021. The name of the jamboree was a play on the Irish word rí which means King in Irish, with a theme of Rí-Create – Rí-Imagine and – Rí-Discover.

There was 9 sub camps, Each named after a fictional realm.

== JamÓige ==
A Beaver and Cub Scout event over a long holiday weekend in June. Cub Scouts camp over-night for 3 nights and Beaver Scouts join, initially for the last night, but since 2012 for 2 last nights.

- JamÓige 2009: 29 May – 1 June. 4,250 attended in Dalgan Park, County Meath. Deirdre Butler was camp chief.
- JamÓige 2012: 1–4 June. 4,600 attended in Ardgillian Castle, County Dublin. David Kessie was camp chief.
- JamÓige 2016: 3–6 June. 4,500 attended in Pallaskenry, County Limerick. Stephen Halpin was camp chief.
- JamÓige 2022: 3–6 June. Jamangi. was deferred from 2021 due to the COVID-19 pandemic in Ireland.

== See also ==
- Scouting Ireland
- Jamboree (Scouting)
