= Scout province (Scouting Ireland) =

Admin division of Scouting Ireland

Break down of Provinces

A Scout Province is an administrative division within Scouting Ireland. Each province comprises a number of Scout Counties, which are mobilised and coordinated to combine their resources for the improvement of Scouting at a local level.

There are six Scout Provinces in Ireland: Dublin, Northern, North Eastern, Western, Southern and South Eastern. They are based on a geographical area of reasonable distance and the National Management Committee determines their boundaries.

The Scout Province is organised and administered by the Provincial Management/Support Team (PMST). The primary role of the Scout Province is to support Scouting at local level by assisting and supporting Scout Counties in fulfilling their role and by assisting in the making of Scouting Ireland's policies and ensuring that these policies are carried out.

Wood Badge Training is carried out within Provinces by Provincial Training Co-ordinators and their teams, administered by Provincial Support Officers, professional staff working in offices within each province.

== Dublin Scout Province ==
Location of Dublin Scout Province

Dublin Scout Province was formed on 1 January 2004 as Dublin Metropolitan Province after the two original Scout associations in Ireland, Scouting Ireland S.A.I. and Scouting Ireland (CSI) merged to form Scouting Ireland. Both associations voted to join to form a new single association in 2003, following a decision to set this process in motion in 1998. The Province renamed itself in February 2008.

The current Provincial Commissioner is Helena Campbell.

There are 8 counties in the Province.

- Cluain Toirc Scout County
- Dodder Scout County
- Dublinia Scout County
- Dún na Farraige Scout County
- Liffey West Scout County
- Mountpelier Scout County
- Three Rock Scout County
- Tolka Scout County

== Northern Scout Province ==
There are 4 counties in the Province.

- Brian Boru Scout County
- Down & Connor Scout County
- Erne Scout County
- Errigal Scout County

As of January 2023, Provincial Commissioner was Rónán McGibbon.

== North Eastern Scout Province ==
There are 7 counties in the Province.

- Cavan — Monaghan Scout County
- Fingal Scout County
- Reachra Scout County
- Atha Cliath 15 Scout County
- Gleann Na Boinne Scout County
- Lakelands Scout County
- Louth Scout County

== Western Scout Province ==
There are 5 counties in the Province.

- Clare Scout County
- Galway Scout County
- Lough Keel Scout County
- Mayo Scout County
- Sligo Scout County

== Southern Scout Province ==
There are 9 counties in the Province.

- Cois Laoi Chorcaí Scout County
- Cork South Scout County
- Kerry Scout County
- Lee Valley Scout County
- Limerick Scout County
- North Cork Scout County
- Tipperary Scout County (replaced Tipp Cois Suir & Tipp North Scout Counties)
- West Cork Scout County

== South Eastern Scout Province ==
There are 7 counties in the Province.

- Carlow-Kilkenny Scout County
- Cill Dara Scout County
- Cill Mhantáin Scout County
- Slieve Bloom Scout County
- South Kildare Scout County
- Waterford Scout County
- Wexford Scout County
