= Lesotho Girl Guides Association =

National Guiding organization of Lesotho

- Lesotho Girl Guides Association
- Country: Lesotho
- Founded: 1925
- Membership: 1,783
- Affiliation: World Association of Girl Guides and Girl Scouts

The Lesotho Girl Guides Association (LGGA) is the national Guiding organization of Lesotho. It serves 1,783 members (as of 2008). Founded in 1925, the girls-only organization became a full member of the World Association of Girl Guides and Girl Scouts in 1978.

The Girl Guide emblem features a crocodile, the symbol of the dynasty of Lesotho's largest ethnicity, the Sotho.

== See also ==
- Lesotho Scouts Association
