= Eswatini Scout Association =

Scout Association in Eswatini

- Headquarters: Mbabane
- Country: Swaziland
- Founded: 1924
- Membership: 6,850
- Chief Commissioner: Nkosinathi Charles Nxumalo
- Affiliation: World Organization of the Scout Movement
- Website eswatiniscout.org

The Eswatini Scout Association, (formerly the Emavulandlela Swaziland Scout Association and Swaziland Boy Scouts Association) is the national Scouting organization of Eswatini (Swaziland). The boys-only organization was founded in 1924, and became a member of the World Organization of the Scout Movement in 1968. In 2009, there were 6,850 members.

The association is divided into four districts: Hhohho, Lubombo, Manzini and Shishelweni.

== Ideals and method ==

The Scout Motto is Hlala ulungele! in siSwati. The highest rank is Lion Scout.

=== Scout Promise in English and siSwati ===
On my honour, I promise to do my best,
To do my duty to God, the King,
To help other people at all times
And to keep the Scout Law.

Ngekwetsembeka kwami,
Ngiyetsembisa kutsi ngitawenta konkhe lokusemandleni ami,
kusebentela Nkulunkulu, neNkhosi yakaNgwane,
kusita bantfu ngaso sonkhe sikhatsi,
nekugcina umtsetfo weMavulandlela.

=== Scout Laws ===
- A Scout is to be trusted
- A Scout is loyal
- A Scout is friendly and considerate
- A Scout is a brother to all Scouts
- A Scout has courage to all difficulties
- A Scout make good use of his time and is careful of possessions and property
- A Scout has respect for himself and for others

== See also ==
- Eswatini Girl Guides Association
- Lesotho Scouts Association
- Scouts South Africa
