= Eswatini Girl Guides Association =

National Guiding organization of Eswatini

- Headquarters: Manzini
- Country: Eswatini
- Founded: 1924
- Membership: 3,450
- Affiliation: World Association of Girl Guides and Girl Scouts

The Eswatini Girl Guides Association (formerly The Swaziland Girl Guides Association) is the national Guiding organization of Eswatini (Swaziland). It serves 3,450 members (as of 2017) (1,010 members in 2003, 1,836 in 1972). It was founded in 1924 as a girls-only organization. World Chief Guide Olave Baden Powell visited in 1950 it became a Branch Association of The Guide Association in the UK. It became a self-governing body in 1969 when it became an associate member of the World Association of Girl Guides and Girl Scouts in 1969.

The organization merged with "The Wayfareres" a similar organization.

There are three youth sections. Blue Jays were the original, followed by the Ranger section in 1963, and Cadets in 1968, and was renamed following the renaming of the country in 2018.

== See also ==
- Eswatini Scout Association
