= Lesotho Scout Association =

National Scouting association of Lesotho

- Country: Lesotho
- Founded: 1936
- Membership: 2,630
- Affiliation: World Organization of the Scout Movement

Lesotho Scout Association is the national Scouting association of Lesotho. Founded in 1936, it became a member of the World Organization of the Scout Movement in 1971. Lesotho Scout Association serves 2,630 Boy Scouts as of 2021.

As Lesotho is a small, mountainous country with difficult communication links, Scouting's growth is often difficult. Although the association is small, they have attended several World Jamborees. One Scout participated in the 19th World Jamboree in Chile in 1998.

In January 2016, Lesotho Scouts Association signed a Memorandum of Understanding with the Scouting Ireland. The countries will participate in a partnership called Lumela-Fáilte, based on intercultural sharing. The partnership has been in progress since 2010, with Scouting Ireland supporting two Basotho Rover Scouts to attend the 2015 World Scout Jamboree in Japan.

== Ideals ==
=== Scout Law ===
1. A Scout is to be trusted
2. A Scout is loyal
3. A Scout is friendly and considerate
4. A Scout is a friend to all and a brother to every other Scout
5. A Scout is brave
6. A Scout makes good use of time and is careful of possessions and property
7. A Scout has self-respect and respect for others

=== Scout Promise ===
On my honour, I promise that I will do my best to do my duty to God, to the king and my country, to help other people at all times and to obey the Scout laws.

== See also ==
- Lesotho Girl Guides Association
- Scouts South Africa
- Eswatini Scout Association
