= Sea Scouts (Scouting Ireland) =

Nautically focused Irish Scouting programme

Sea Scouts (Gasóga Mara)
- Owner: Scouting Ireland
- Age range: Beaver Scouts 6-8; Cub Scouts 9-11; Scouts 12-15; Venture Scouts 15-17; Rover Scouts 18-26
- Country: Ireland
- Founded: 1912
- Chief Scout: Eoin Calnan
- National Commissioner (Sea Scouting): Colum McCaffrey
- Website https://www.seascouts.ie/

Sea Scouting (Irish: Gasógaíacht Mhara) has existed in Ireland since 1912 and is a popular programme framework within Scouting Ireland.

Sea Scouting Groups operate as autonomous, volunteer-led community groups. Sea Scouting Groups operate in the same way as other Scout Groups except have a stronger focus on water safety, seamanship training and activities on the water.

The programme is designed to foster a love of adventure on the water alongside building technical activity skills and leadership afloat.

Typical activities may include; dinghy sailing, rowing, rafting, swimming, kayaking, windsurfing, powerboating, canoeing, marine science and oceanography, keelboat sailing, engine maintenance, chartwork and navigation, preservation of maritime heritage, water safety and seamanship; ropework, line-handling, meteorology, boat maintenance, communications.

Ireland and Sea Scouting has lots of diverse maritime culture so Sea Scouting Groups often emphasise a nautical framework and tradition in their activities.

- Patrols are called Watches.

- A Section Leader is called Skipper.

- Most Sea Scouting Scouts, Ventures, Rovers and Scouters will wear the Navy-Knit Sea Scout Jumper, belt and duck (hat) as their uniform.

- Most Sea Scouting Beavers and Cubs will wear the Navy-Knit Sea Scout Jumper.

- Many Groups are known by their Port Number. e.g. 1st Port of Dublin (Ringsend).

- Blessing of the Boats/ Launch Day is an annual feature to formally start the summer boating season.

- Laying-Up Supper is a celebration of a successful year afloat.

Sea Scouting Groups offer a balanced programme of land and water activities to their members by encompassing all aspects of the ONE Programme. Sea Scouts will find themselves just as comfortable on the mountains and hills as they are at sea level. Camping under canvas, campcraft and hiking expeditions are a normal part of the programme.

Sea Scouting is a nautical framework accessible to Beavers, Cubs, Scouts, Ventures and Rovers.

Anyone can become a Sea Scout, commitment to safety, seamanship and adventure afloat.

== History of Sea Scouting (Ireland) ==
The Irish flag, consisting of green, white, and orange.

After Baden-Powell’s book "Scouting for Boys" appeared in 1908, Scout Groups started spontaneously throughout Great Britain and Ireland. Some Groups, including 1st Dublin Troop, Boy Scouts (founded 15 February 1908 by Capt.Richard P. Fourtune RNR) included boating in their programmes from the beginning, and B-P soon recognised that this was an excellent variation of the Scout programme.

Sea Scouting was officially recognised in 1910, and B-P wrote the first introductory pamphlet "Sea Scouting for Boys". Later B-P asked his brother Warrington, a well known yachtsman, to write a handbook for the new section, and "Sea Scouting and Seamanship for Boys" was published in 1912.

The first Sea Scout Troops in Ireland were registered in 1912, in Bray and in Ringsend (1st Dublin Troop mentioned above), where B-P then appointed Lieut. Henry J.Rundle RN, Officer-Charge, HM Coastguard Malahide, as the 1st Commissioner for Sea Scouting.

Other Troops developed in Dublin in the succeeding years, in most cases alongside HM Coastguard Stations. In 1914 the first inter-Troop rowing race for the Wood-Latimer Cup was held. This event was the start of the Annual Sea Scout Regatta and continues to this day, making it one of the oldest Scouting events in the World.

With the outbreak of World War One, many Sea Scouts and their leaders joined the Royal Navy, often as Signallers or Coast Watch.

In 1915 the Dublin Sea Scout Troops were grouped together in the Port of Dublin Sea Scout Local Association, and they were allocated "Port of Dublin" numbers, a custom that still continues. The annual Seamanship Competition for the Fry Cup started in 1918 with the presentation of a handsome silver cup from Major-General Sir William Fry to the Port of Dublin Sea Scouts. The event continues to the present day and is regarded as Sea Scoutings most prestigious cup to claim.

29 Dublin Sea Scouts attended the 1st World Scout Jamboree in London and were accommodated onboard HMS Sharpshooter.

With the foundation of the Irish Free State in 1922, saw the exist of HM Coastguard from Ireland. This had a huge negative impact to many of the adjoining Sea Scout Troops. In addition, with the growing sense of Irish Nationalism, Scouting was seen as a very British organisation. To that end, the Catholic Boy Scouts of Ireland were founded in 1927, and started a Sea Scouting programme a year later, basing the organisation of the Boy Scouts of America model. This was a Senior Section, over 14 years of age who formed themselves into ‘Ships’ or Units. By the late 1930s CBSI had about 10 Ships (Units) in the Dublin area, and Ships in Cork, Galway, Waterford and Wexford, a total of 14. These Ship were also given ‘Port Numbers’ alongside their UK Boy Scout Association counterparts.

World War Two broke out and by its conclusion all CBSI Sea Scouting Units have closed and only 1st Port of Dublin (Ringsend) and 4th Port of Dublin (Dodder) remain.

1948, the Boy Scouts of Ireland is established and becomes independent of the previous British Association. This will later be renamed as the Scout Association of Ireland. Sea Scouting in Ireland experienced a period of growth, expanding from two troops in 1948 to four in 1958, twelve in 1968, and thirty-eight by 1978. The first of these Troops outside Dublin was 1st Wexford (New Ross) in 1965. The expansion between 1968 and 1978 presented organizational challenges, and several troops disbanded due to a shortage of leadership and operational support., mainly due to problems of back-up support and of maintaining adequate supply of Leaders.

In the mid 1970s the former lightship, "Albatross", was acquired as a Sea Training Centre. This was a great boost to training and was an activity centre where troops with little equipment could send Scouts for boating experience. She was moored in Dun Laoghaire Harbour for many happy years. In 1976, the Irish Sea Scout Standard Boat, the "BP-18" was designed by Kevin McClaverty, and became a standard general purpose craft for Sea Scouts.

The BP-18 was designed to accommodate a patrol and can be operated using sails, oars, or an outboard engine to suit varying group requirements.

More than forty years later, twenty-eight BP-18 vessels remain in service across the country.

In the 1980s, CBSI remove Sea Scouting from their programme and develop a Water Activities Centre at Killaloe on Lough Derg on the Shannon. In 1985, SAI published a new series of handbooks covering the nautical requirements of the Sea Scout programme (Sea Training Handbooks, Parts 1 and 2), and also a Sea Scout Leaders Handbook. These handbooks served as the foundational standard for subsequent decades.

From 1998 to 2002, SAI complete a very detailed examination of the Sea Scouting programme. This included a country-wide survey of all Sea Scout Troops, with questionnaires for each Scout and Leader on training schemes and programmes, uniform, activities and competitions. A committee was established to examine the Sea Scout Programme in detail, using the Renewed Approach to Programme (RAP) method recommended by World Scouting. This was a lengthy process involving 9 stages, with masses of paperwork. The new programme was designed, and a new advancement Badge Scheme was devised to implement it. The new Sea Scout Programme was launched in 2002, and includes a completely revised Progress Scheme, balanced between ashore and afloat, with a wide choice of activities.

Following the merger in 2004 of SAI and CBSI to create Scouting Ireland, a lengthy programme review process commenced to review every aspect of youth programme delivered by Scouting Ireland. In 2010 the ONE Programme became the programme of Scouting Ireland and is used in all five Programme Sections. As a result, Sea Scout Groups now deliver a Sea Scouting programme to all their youth members, from age 6 to age 26. This takes the shape of the Nautical Training Scheme, a programme accessible to all Sea Scouting and Scout Groups.

In 2022, a significant nautical programme review was conducted to ensure Sea Scouting remain attractive to young people and accessible to volunteer Scout Groups regardless their level of skill or resources available. With this output as the goal, the Scouting Ireland SAILS Framework was developed. It was a new nautical programme pathway comprising Safety Afloat, Adventures Afloat, Inclusion Afloat, Leadership Afloat, and Sustainability Afloat, an entire ecosystem with over 1,000 badges awarded to young people in its first six months.

Merged content from History of Sea Scouting (Scouting Ireland) to here.

== Sea Scout Boats ==
=== Sea Scout Standard Boat (BP18) ===
During 1976 a questionnaire was sent to all Sea Scout Leaders throughout the country asking for their ideas about a Standard boat for Sea Scout use. At that time the nearest there was to a standard rowing craft was the East Coast Skiff. This was however confined to the east coast, and was considered by some to be unsuitable for their needs and comparatively expensive for a craft which could not be used for sailing also. The "Mirror" dinghy was used in some Groups for sailing instruction. The general feeling throughout the section was that we needed a boat about 18 to 20 feet long, which could carry about 5 or 6 Scouts and could be rowed or sailed. Information about other Sea Scout boats was obtained – the New Zealand Standard Boat, the British "Home Counties Gig" and the Dutch "Lelievlet". Mr. Kevin MacLaverty, a marine architect, expressed interest in our project, and all the information that had been collected was handed over to him for study and opinion. The result was a set of plans and a model of a proposed new Irish Standard Sea Scout Boat which were presented to the Sea Scout Leaders’ Conference in Cobh in 1977. The design was for a "double-ender", 18 feet over all, capable of being rowed with 2, 4 or 6 oars, and rigged for sail as a ketch. The conference adopted the design, and a committee was established to pursue the matter further, particularly to seek sponsorship for making the mould. This sponsorship was eventually provided by the British Petroleum Company, and therefore the class was named "BP 18". The standard sailing rig is a Bermudan Ketch, with the jib and mainsail being the same size as those of a G.P.14.

Details and Specifications

- LOA: 18’ 1.5" (5.52 m)
- LWL: 15’ 0" (4.57 m)
- BEAM: 6’ 2" (1.88 m)
- DRAFT: 1’ 2" (0.35 m)
- HULL: Moulded GRP with timber topstrake, keel and bilge
- RIG: Bermudan Ketch.
- SAIL AREA: 1200 sq.ft (111.5 sq.m)

=== Lelievlet ===
The Lelievlet is the most commonly used steel sailing and rowing boat of the Sea Scouts of Scouting Nederland, it is also used by the National Water Activities Centre (NWAC) in Killaloe, Ireland. Its design is based upon the beenhakkervlet and its name is derived from the international Scout logo, the French lily.

Details and specifications

- Height: 5.60 m
- Width: 1.80 m
- Height: 6.50 m
- Avg. Weight: 650 kg
- Sail: 12.15 m^2

== Irish Sea Scout Flags ==
The emblem on the ensign is that of the Scouting Ireland association, whereas the emblem on the pennant is a non-fouled version of the Scouting Ireland Sea Scout and Water Activities logo.
