= Scout Association of Ireland =

Scouting Ireland SAI
- Headquarters: Lough Dan
- Country: Republic of Ireland, Northern Ireland
- Founded: 1908
- Defunct: 2004
- Founder: Richard P. Fortune
- Affiliation: World Organization of the Scout Movement

The Scout Association of Ireland (SAI; Irish: Cumann Gasógaíochta na hÉireann) was an Irish multi-denominational Scout association from 1908 until 2004, when it merged with the former Catholic Boy Scouts of Ireland to form Scouting Ireland. It was named "Scouting Ireland (SAI)" in the years leading up to the merger. The SAI was formed soon after the publication of Scouting for Boys and was affiliated to the British Boy Scout Association, which meant its members were mainly unionist and hence Protestant in background. After the 1920s partition of Ireland, the SAI remained organised in both the Republic of Ireland and Northern Ireland.

== History ==
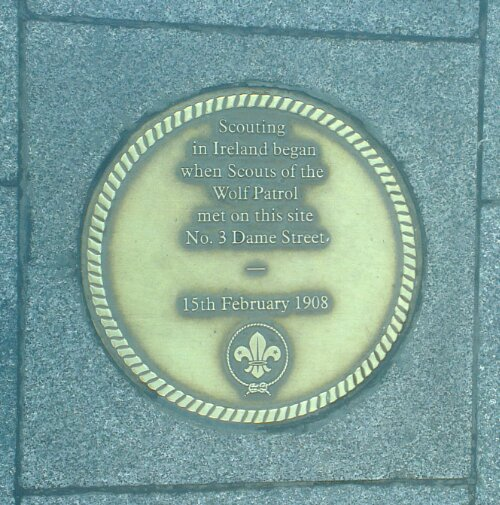
Plaque at 3 Dame Street, Dublin which marks the site of the first Scout meeting in Ireland.

Scouting Ireland (SAI) traces its origins to the foundation of Scouting in Ireland. The initial growth mirrors that of Scouting in the United Kingdom, with groups forming organically, with young people and adults inspired by Baden Powell's writings coming together. Formal structures came later. The first Scout Groups in Dublin came together to form the Dublin City and County Boy Scouts, but it would be false to think that Scouting first established itself in the capital, with Groups in Wicklow and Louth among the first to form. Later, the County Wicklow Scout Association and the Port of Dublin Sea Scout Association established themselves in and around the capital. As Ireland remained part of the British Empire, the governance of Scouting in Ireland was headed in an official capacity by The Scout Association and its Chief Scout, Robert Baden-Powell

The first recorded meeting took place at the home of Richard P. Fortune, a Royal Naval Reservist, at 3 Dame Street, Dublin on 15 February 1908 where four boys were enrolled in the Wolf Patrol of the 1st Dublin Troop. Fortune's 1st Dublin Troop would go on to become the first group to register as part of the Port of Dublin Sea Scout Association in 1912, becoming 1st Port of Dublin Sea Scouts (Ringsend). A plaque marks the location of the house, now demolished, on the plaza next to Dublin's City Hall. The 2nd Dublin formed the following week at 5 Upper Camden Street. Details of the formation of early Scout Patrols and Troops are sketchy, as initially there was no administration to keep such records, but other Scout Troops formed in Dublin and in Bray, Greystones, Dundalk and Belfast in the early months of 1908. The Greystones and Dundalk troops have been in continuous existence ever since.

In 1921, the signing of the Anglo-Irish Treaty established the Irish Free State. At this time, the name of Irish Free State Scout Council was adopted, as the association expanded its reach outside of the greater Dublin area, becoming a national organisation. The name of the association was changed again with the foundation of the Republic of Ireland. Taking on the title of the Boy Scouts of Ireland. At this time, the association also gained the recognition of the World Organization of the Scout Movement (WOSM) becoming Ireland's only officially recognised Scout association.

In 1927, the Catholic Boy Scouts of Ireland (CBSI) was formed under the guidance of the Catholic Church as a means of imprinting a Catholic ethos on the young men of Ireland. Originating with Fr. Ernest Farrell, a curate in Greystones, County Wicklow in 1925/1926, the association was hastened in its initiation by his brother Fr. Tom Farrell, a curate in the Pro-Cathedral.

The association continued to work through the 1950s and 1960s during which it adapted to the development of Ireland as an independent republic. In 1965, the SAI formed the Federation of Irish Scout Associations (FISA) with the CBSI. This enabled the two associations and their members the recognition and resources of WOSM. All Scouts in Ireland were thus able to play an active role in International Scouting.

Developments following the late 60's saw the association take on the name of the Scout Association of Ireland. This was subsequently changed to Scouting Ireland (SAI) in advance of the merging of the association with the CBSI. From 1 January 2004, both the SAI and the CSI ceased operations. Scouting in Ireland from this point forward would be overseen by the unified Scouting Ireland.

In May 2020, it was revealed that prior to the 2004 merger with the CBSI which formed Scouting Ireland, the SAI covered up sex abuse committed by people who served in the organization. In a period spanning decades, both the CBSI and SAI shielded 275 known or suspected predators who abused children after becoming aware of the reported acts of abuse. Scouting Ireland backed the findings of the report and issued an apology.

== Association ==
logo of the SAI

The SAI was, from its inception, a multi-denominational organisation, accepting members of all faiths and beliefs, and none. Four sections were operated, Beavers, Cubs, Scouts and Ventures. These sections were introduced over time, responding to the need for peer groups to work together as part of the Scout Method.

The association also operated a Sea Scout section, stemming from its origins in the Port of Dublin Sea Scout Association. These groups wore a uniform distinct from that of other Scouts and utilised a version of the Scout method which was based heavily on a nautical framework. Sea Scouts could be said to descend from a naval tradition as opposed to the military tradition from which Scouting in its purest form originated.

In 1968, the SAI became a co-educational association. This was in line with the proliferation of co-educational schools in Ireland beyond the niche which they had traditionally occupied. This trend has continued, with females now making up some forty percent of the membership of the SAI's successor, Scouting Ireland

Lough Dan in Roundwood, County Wicklow served as the associations national campsite. Located beside the lake of the same name, the site offered amenities including sailing, kayaking, archery, orienteering and mountaineering as well as maintaining an extensive bivvi site in the forests above the site. A national jamboree was hosted in Lough Dan in 1997. The site remains a part of Scouting Ireland's national campsite network alongside Larch Hill, Mount Melleray, Killaloe National Scout Water Activity Centre and Castle Saunderson.

== Chief Scouts ==
Until 1949 Ireland was a part of the British Commonwealth, as such the SAI shared a common Chief Scout with the other Scout associations of the nations in the Commonwealth. Most notably, for the first thirty-three years of its existence, the association's Chief Scout was the father of Scouting, Robert Baden-Powell. As Ireland left the Commonwealth, the SAI became independent of the Scout Association in Britain and therefore maintained its own Chief Scouts. The following people were the Chief Scouts of the SAI up until the creation of Scouting Ireland in 2004:

- 1908–1941: Robert Baden-Powell, 1st Baron Baden-Powell
- 1941–1944: Arthur Somers-Cocks, 6th Baron Somers
- 1945–1949: Thomas Corbett, 2nd Baron Rowallan
- 1949–1965: Mervyn Wingfield, 9th Viscount Powerscourt
- 1966–1973: Ernest Judge
- 1973–1980: Commodore Thomas McKenna
- 1980–1984: Joseph McGough, S.C.
- 1984–1991: Eoghan Lavelle
- 1991–1997: Kenneth Ramsey
- 1997–2004: Donald Harvey

== See also ==
- Lough Dan
- Scouting Ireland (CSI)
- Scouting Ireland
- Irish Scout Jamboree
