= Larch Hill =

Headquarters of Scouting Ireland

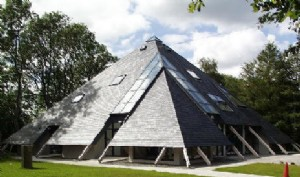
- Owner: Scouting Ireland
- Location: Tibradden, Dublin
- Country: Ireland
- Coordinates: 53.253885°N 6.281766°W
- Founded: 1938
- Founder: Prof. J B Whelehan
- Centre manager: Matthew Dineen
- Website https://natcentres.ie/project/larch-hill-international-scout-guide-centre/

Larch Hill International Scout and Guide Centre is the national campsite, and administrative and training headquarters, of Scouting Ireland. It was previously owned by Scouting Ireland (CSI), one of the two scout organisations which merged to form Scouting Ireland.

== Overview ==
Larch Hill, which was purchased in 1937, has seen a number of developments following the creation of Scouting Ireland in 2004. A pyramidical headquarters building is a focal point of Larch Hill. Larch Hill is so called as it is reputed that it was the site of the first ever planting of the European Larch species in Ireland.

The site, which is at 226 metres above sea level, consists of camping fields, a small hostel, conference facilities (in the Millennium Room), hiking trails, a nature centre, a Beaver Scout playground and a large campfire circle.

The warden staff of the site, or the Meitheal, are voluntary members of Scouting Ireland and wear an orange neckerchief with the Larch symbol. They were also entitled (under Scouting Ireland (CSI)) to wear unique orange epaulettes.

== History ==
=== Early history ===
Larch Hill has been the home of several individuals over the centuries, the earliest known being a 'Mr. Smith', who is noted as living there on an 1801 map.

The earliest existing buildings, however, were built as a summer house for a wealthy Dublin merchant, J.P., and Alderman John O'Neill (1768/9-1843) of Fitzwilliam Square, whose business premises were on Ormond Quay. He was at Larch Hill by 1821 at the latest, when he engaged in a charitable parish project of the Rathfarnham Free School "for Educating and Clothing Ninety-four poor Children". He supported the parish and helped the building of a church for the new Church of Ireland parish of Whitechurch, where his family grave and monument can still be found. John O'Neill's son sold Larch Hill in 1845.

Another tombstone exists in the graveyard which bears the inscription "Courtney Kenny Clarke, Larch Hill, Died 1873". Again, this owner was a wealthy businessman, and possibly an owner of one of the many mills which existed along the banks of the Owendoher River in Rockbrook. The family of Clarke donated funds to the Whitechurch Church of Ireland Chapel which enabled a vestry to be dedicated in his memory. Clarke married Frances Esther Penfold, a daughter of John Penfold, vicar at Steyning from 1792 until his death in 1840. One of her brothers was Christopher Rawson Penfold of Penfold Wines, Australia. Frances Penfold was born in 1803. Her first husband was John Walker, who died on their honeymoon in Naples in January 1830. Frances Penfold died in August 1928. Her second husband, Courtney K. Clarke of Larch Hill, died aged 70, on 28 November 1873.

=== Late 19th century to 1937 ===
Very little is known about the ownership from the 1870s until early in the 20th century. During the years 1914 to 1918 it is known that Larch Hill became a military sanatorium, and may have been used by soldiers affected by mustard gas, used during the First World War, to convalesce.

According to the "history" section of the Larch Hill website, the "period 1918 to 1937 is also sketchy, however Sean Innes, the former warden, whose family occupied the now demolished Gate Lodge during this period, remembered that an American gentleman lived in Larch Hill with his mother" during the 1920s. In the period just preceding the purchase of the estate by CBSI in 1937, a Dublin businessman and bookmaker, John Coffey, owned the estate, but he found himself in financial difficulties, and the bank took possession of the estate. His father, William, was Lord Mayor of Dublin, Alderman and High-Sheriff.

=== Scouting ===
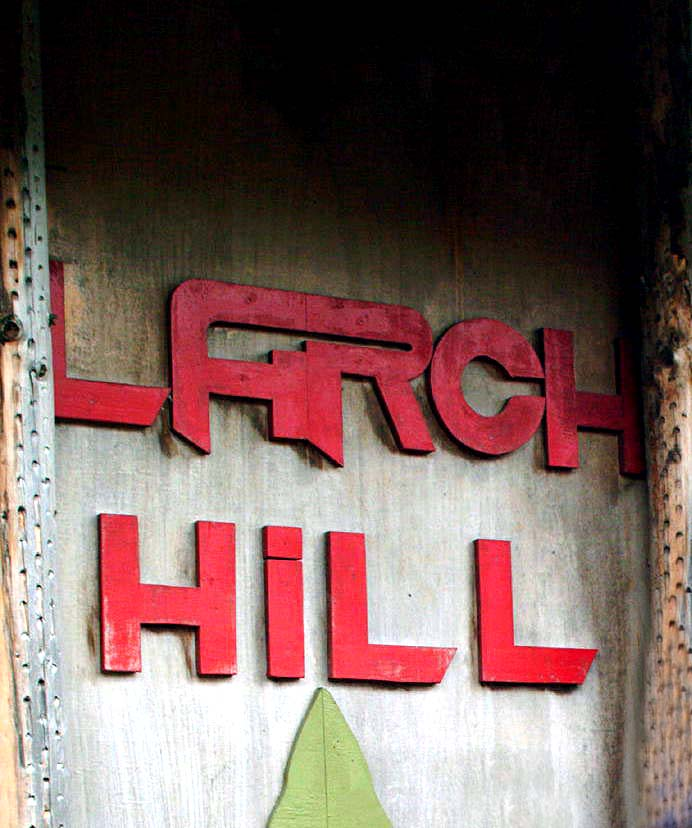
Welcome sign at Larch Hill

In 1937 Professor J.B. Whelehan, the then Chief Scout, together with the National Executive Board, of CBSI (later Scouting Ireland (CSI)), decided to purchase a campsite. Many venues were suggested, but eventually two options remained. One was Santry Demesne, part of which is now the Morton Stadium for athletics, near Dublin Airport, and the other was Larch Hill. The decision fell to the casting vote of Prof. Whelehan, whose "foresight saw that the Santry location would become part of the city much quicker than it's [sic] South-side counterpart". The funding for the purchase of Larch Hill came from the 3,000 pounds profit the association made from non-Scout fares on the 1934 pilgrimage to Rome, and a 500-pound donation from the Knights of Saint Columbanus.

Larch Hill officially opened as a campsite on 4 June 1938. An outdoor mass was celebrated in the garden area by Fr. Leo Mc Cann C.C., and was attended by over 400 Scouts from the Dublin Archdiocese (which received support around this time from John Charles McQuaid) who were participating in the inaugural camp over the Whit weekend.

The Meitheal also ran a series of Cub and Scout camps summer camps in the form of mini-jamborees including "Camp Millennium" in 1988 to mark Dublin's 1,000 year anniversary and "Hill 96" that included over 1,200 Cubs, Scouts and Venturers.

=== 21st century ===
"The Hill", as it is known, has seen a number of changes in the 21st century. These include the construction of the pyramid building which houses those who work for Scouting Ireland on a permanent basis. The glass building also contains a function room named the Millennium Room which acts as a multipurpose meeting place for Scouts and Scouters. It also holds a bust of Fr. Tom Farrell, the founder of the Catholic Boy Scouts of Ireland (which came from the former national headquarters of Catholic Boy Scouts of Ireland at 71 St Stephen's Green and later at 19 Herbert Place) and a museum given over to national and international badges and mementoes from World Scout Jamborees. The campsite hosted one of the four national camps to celebrate the 75th year of Scouting Ireland (CSI) in 2002. It also plays host to the National Scout, Venture Scout and Rover Scout Fora each year. In Summer 2006, it hosted an international jamboree for Deaf Scouts hosted by the 191st Dublin

==== Shield ====
Larch Hill is used to host a number of the county-level shield competitions held by counties within the Dublin Scout Province. Shields differ from county to county with different awards and structure. Each shield has a ranking system based on marks given throughout the weekend the top three people with the highest marks move onto the Phoenix competition, similar to the shield but a national rather than regional competition.

== Layout ==
=== Camping fields ===
Camping fields at Larch Hill include:

- Taylor's Field, named after John Taylor, the first warden on the Hill from the late 1940s to mid-1950s.
- Potato Field, named for the ridges of long forgotten cultivation that are still visible, sometimes called "lazy beds".
- The Melvin Field commemorates the Melvin trophy which was the national Scoutcraft competition of the association (now the Phoenix Patrol Challenge). The Melvin trophy was presented to the association during the CBSI pilgrimage to Rome during the Holy Year of 1934 by Sir Martin Melvin. The profits made from this journey are believed to have provided the capital that enabled the purchase of Larch Hill, under the then Chief Scout, Prof. JB Whelehan.
- The Training Field was so called because it was the site of many of the early leader training (Wood Badge) courses. In the late 1950s and early 1960s an élite group of leaders formed a troop called the 1st Larch Hill (note the similarity with the 1st Gilwell Park) which wore a grey neckerchief and acted as a proto-National Training Team. Members included PJ Killackey (who went on to become National Director of Cubs/Macaomh, Camping and National Commissioner), Con Twomey, Seamus Durkan (later National Commissioner), Fr. Aengus OFM Cap and Patrick Bradley of the 37th Cork (who led the only troop ever to win 4 consecutive Melvin trophies). They conducted courses instructing leaders in the methods and aims of Catholic Scouting. The first Training Course took place on September 8, 1956.
- The Haggard Field is an old Irish name for a small enclosure that is used to store fodder for animals. Like many small fields in parts of Ireland, it is surrounded by stone walls
- The Upper and Lower Dolmen Fields are named after the ruined megalithic tomb that can still be seen in the field.
- The Triangle field is so-called because of its shape.
- The Cub Field is a large flat field which makes it suitable for younger Scouts and Cub-Scouts.
- Kelly's Field is named after Kelly's Glen.
- The Crow's Nest is so named because it is surrounded by tall trees which are nesting ground for crows.

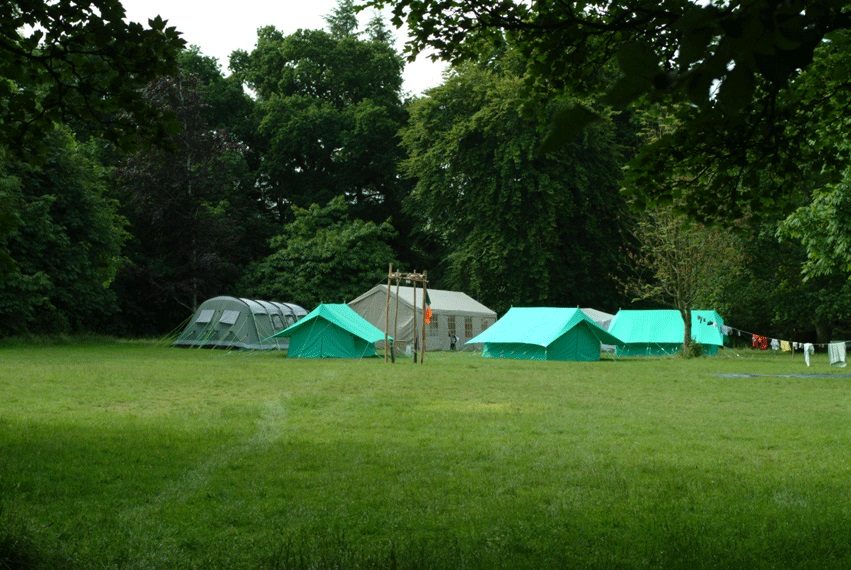
Camping at Larch Hill

=== Garden ===
The garden area is almost 1-acre (4,000 m^{2}) in size and contains several exotic species of trees, for example the Monkey Puzzle (Araucaria araucana).

=== Other features ===
The present car park had been the stable and farmyard in the 19th century, and contained stables and outhouses, the remains of the foundations of these buildings can be seen adjacent to the existing toilet block.

The Mass Lawn area was originally a tennis court and is referred to as such by the locals. The altar on the mass lawn was constructed from the granite steps that led to the front door of the original house. The house was demolished in the 1970s following the completion of the existing hostel in 1972. President Éamon de Valera performed the opening ceremony for the new hostel. The existing main entrance is not in fact the original entrance. That entrance to the estate was some 20 yards (18 m) inwards and the old gateposts can still be seen.

The Ice-House (a bunker like building) on the lower avenue was the original "refrigerator" for the old manor house. The river would have been blocked during the winter and blocks of ice cut and placed in the pit at the end of the building. Food was then stored in layers of straw, and the building sealed up. The building was accessed during summer by way of a hatch in the roof of the building.

The dolmen or cromlech is one of three that can be found in the vicinity, the others being on Tibradden Mountain and at Mount Venus. It is sometimes referred to by locals as "the druids altar" or the "druids seat". An inner ring of partially submerged boulders and an outer ring of sycamore trees surround the feature.

Larch Hill International Scout and Guide Centre has two Adirondack shelters available for hire. Each shelter sleeps 8 people and they are located in the forestry above the Dolmen Field. Larch Hill is located a short distance from the Dublin Mountain Way and the Wicklow Way.

==== River and swimming ====
The River Glin, which is a tributary of the Owendoher River and so of the River Dodder, comes from the valley, known as Kelly's Glen, between Kilmashogue and Tibradden Mountains. During the 19th century residents of Dublin would travel to the glen to sample the waters, which were reputed to have a strong mineral content, at a spa which was situated in the upper part of the glen.

A pool on the River Glin, at the lower end of the estate, was built under the directorship of Paudge O'Broin, and lasted many years, though it was out of use as of 2018.

At the entrance to the Crow's Nest field is a large depression which is the venue of one of the earliest Scout attempts to provide a swimming pool at Larch Hill. This area is known as "Matthews's Folly", after the then director of the campsite, Nicholas Matthews, who undertook the unsuccessful venture during the 1940s.

== Fauna ==
Among the many inhabitants of the estate are badgers, squirrels and deer. The aforementioned bookmaker and former owner of the estate, John Coffey, kept racehorses on the site. One of these horses, named "Fast Pam", is reputed to be buried near the campfire circle.

== Activities ==
Larch Hill offers outdoor adventure and educational activities, categorised into staff-led and group-led experiences:

=== Instructed activities ===
These activities are supervised by trained centre staff:

- Climbing wall
- Archery
- Abseiling

=== Self-led activities ===
These activities are managed by the visiting group's own leaders:

- Grass sleds
- Bouldering wall
- Orienteering course
- Picture trail
- Team-building boxes
- Bio-diversity boxes
- Access to multiple hiking routes throughout the Dublin and Wicklow Mountains

=== Surroundings and wilderness ===
Larch Hill is situated near the Dublin Mountains, the broader Wicklow Mountains, and the Wicklow Way. Also nearby is the historic monastery of St. Kevin at Glendalough.

The forest on-site is frequently used for bivouacking during the summer months. The forest in the north-eastern corner of the site has a canopy of Norway Spruce trees, while the southernmost wooded area is populated by Sycamores, Elms, and Larches, which provide shelter for survival camping and nature connection.

The Tree Council of Ireland in conjunction with An Comhairle Oidhreachta, The Irish Heritage Council, has produced a booklet called the "Larch Hill Tree Trail" which details 25 of the tree species which are part of the campsite, including the main inhabitants, the Larch, Sequoia and the Sitka Spruce.[12] Following the "Tree Trail" takes walkers to every corner of the site, taking in each camping field in turn.

== Ties with local Scout troops ==
A number of local groups have contributed to the establishment and development of Larch Hill. The 13th Dublin gave Larch Hill the first forms of motorised transport, a truck chassis and engine. They were also involved in the project of widening and damming of the stream to create a swimming pool. The construction took several years in the 1950s and 1960s. By 1963, a pool 50 feet (15 m) by 24 feet (7.3 m) was constructed. Photographs of the pool when it was still functioning are on display in a permanent exposition in the den of the 13th Dublin.
