= Mount Melleray =

Irish townland and Scout centre

Mount Melleray Cnoc Mheilearaí
- Townland
- Mountmelleray
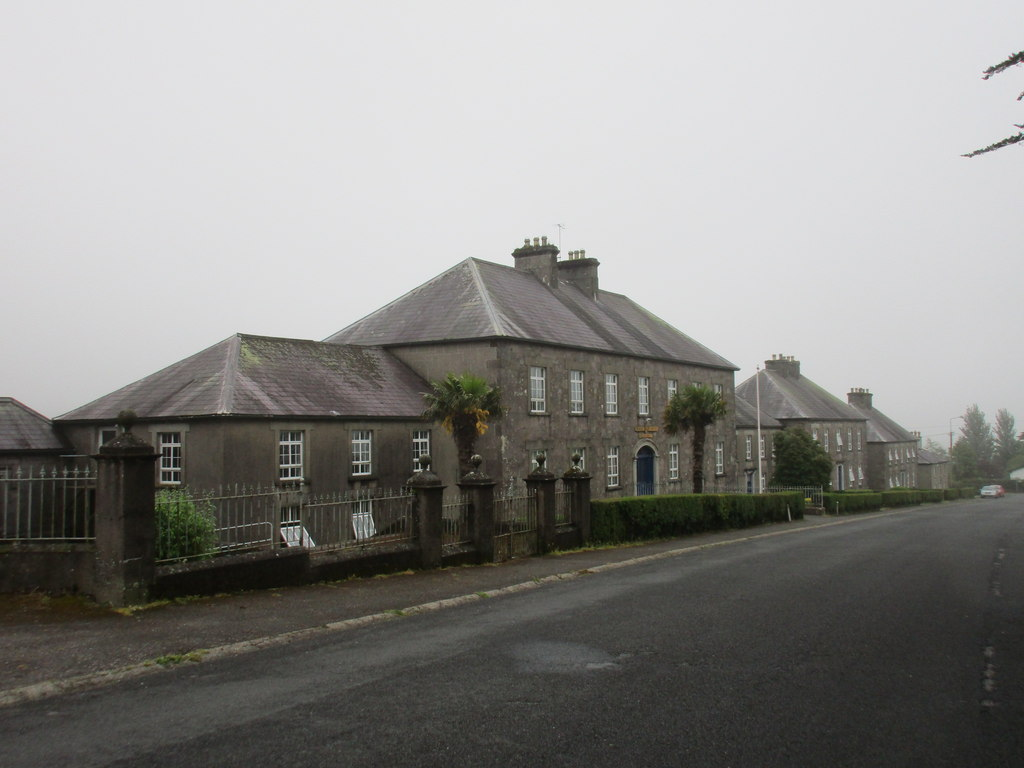
- Former 19th-century monastery boarding houses, now the Scout Centre, in Mount Melleray

- Location within Ireland
- Coordinates: 52.186°N 7.857°W
- Country: Ireland
- County: County Waterford
- Barony: Coshmore and Coshbride
- Civil parish: Lismore and Mocollop

Area
  - Total: 2.25 km^{2} (0.87 sq mi)

Mount Melleray, also spelled Mountmelleray (Irish: Cnoc Mheilearaí, meaning 'hill of Meilearaí'), is a townland situated in the Knockmealdown Mountains near Cappoquin, County Waterford, Ireland. It is in the civil parish of Lismore and Mocollop in the historical barony of Coshmore and Coshbride. The townland, which is 2.25 square kilometres (0.87 sq mi) in area, had a population of 31 people as of the 2011 census. It is home to the Cistercian monastery, Mount Melleray Abbey, and a Scout centre operated by Scouting Ireland.

== Abbey ==
The townland is home to Mount Melleray Abbey, a Cistercian monastery, the first such monastery to be built in Ireland after the Reformation. Built in the early 19th century, it is now home to a community of Trappist monks.

== Scout centre ==
A Scout centre run by Scouting Ireland, formerly Scouting Ireland (CSI), is also situated at Mount Melleray. The centre, which was a former monastic boarding house acquired in 1979, includes a museum documenting the history of Scouting in Ireland. The centre is made up of a small camping field adjoining a large dormitory centre which also contains a climbing wall. Mount Melleray hosted the last Melvin All Ireland Scoutcraft competition of Scouting Ireland (CSI) in 2003. As of September 2020, the centre had been closed for renovations since March 2019. In May 2025, Scouting Ireland announced that it planned to return the Scout centre to the Cistercian community.
