= Martin Melvin (businessman) =

British Baronet (1879–1952)

Sir Martin John Melvin, 1st Baronet, JP (8 June 1879 – 11 May 1952) was a British businessman and newspaper manager, based in Birmingham.

The Roman-Catholic Melvin was educated at Mount St Mary's College. In 1917 he acquired the ailing Catholic newspaper The Universe, appointed Herbert S. Dean as its editor and completely overhauled the content and theological outlook of the paper. He was knighted in the 1927 Birthday Honours and created a Baronet, of Olton in the County of Warwick, in 1933, "For political and public services in Birmingham". Melvin died in May 1952, aged 72, when the baronetcy became extinct.

Baronetage of the United Kingdom
New creation	Baronet (of Olton); 1933–1952	Extinct
