= Scouting Ireland =

Irish Scouting organisation established in 2004

- Scouting Ireland logo
- Headquarters: Larch Hill
- Country: Republic of Ireland, Northern Ireland
- Founded: 1 January 2004
- Founders: Richard P. Fortune (1908), Tom and Ernest Farrell (1927)
- Membership: 38,013 as of December 2025 incl. 27,881 juvenile
- Chief Scout: Eoin Callanan
- Chief Executive: Sean Sheehan
- Affiliation: World Organization of the Scout Movement
- Website http://www.scouts.ie/
- Neckerchiefs are used to identify Scouts from different groups, e.g. one group might wear blue and red, while another might wear yellow and blue.

Scouting Ireland (Irish: Gasóga na hÉireann) is one of the largest youth movements on the island of Ireland, a voluntary educational movement for young people with over 35,000 members, including over 9,000 adult volunteers early 2025. Of the 750,000 people between the ages of 6 and 18 in Ireland, over 6% are involved with the organisation. It was founded in 2004, following the amalgamation of two of the Scouting organisations on the island. It is the World Organization of the Scout Movement-recognised Scouting association in the Republic of Ireland. In Northern Ireland it operates alongside The Scout Association of the UK and the Baden-Powell Scout Association.

The organisation is independent, non-political, and open to all young people without distinction of origin, race, creed, sexual orientation, spiritual belief or gender, in accordance with the purpose, principles and method conceived by Lord Baden-Powell and as stated by WOSM. The aim of the organisation is to encourage the social, physical, intellectual, character, emotional, and spiritual development aspects (known as the SPICES) of young people "so that they may achieve their full potential and as responsible citizens, to improve society". The process of founding the new organisation came on 21 June 2003, after a merger between Scouting Ireland C.S.I. and Scouting Ireland S.A.I. was announced, becoming effective on 1 January 2004. Its national office is at Larch Hill, County Dublin.

The organisation, which is registered with the Companies Registration Office as a company, is headed by the Chief Scout, and governed by a board of directors who are answerable to the Scout Groups as company members. A small professional staff team is led by a chief executive officer.

== Sections ==
The organisation is known for, and primarily operates through, its Youth Programme, for members aged between 6 and 25 years, divided into the following Sections:

- Beaver Scouts – Ages 6–8
- Cub Scouts – Ages 9–11
- Scouts – Ages 12–15
- Venture Scouts – Ages 15–17
- Rover Scouts – Ages 18–26

Sea Scouts – Sea Scouting is a model for implementing the Scout Method with an emphasis on maritime tradition, nautical skills and water-based activities. Sea Scouting operates throughout the sections, consistent with the above age ranges.

== Organisation ==
=== Scout Group ===
The basic unit of Scouting in Ireland is the Scout Group. Each Group is based around a single meeting place, often a dedicated Scout hall or Scout Den, or may sometimes be a school assembly hall or community facility. A Group may have a number of sections, meeting at different times, and a meeting place may be used by more than one Scout Troop or Cub Scout Pack. Each Group is coordinated by a Scout Group Council, headed up by the Group Leader and Deputy Group Leader, these roles being appointed by the Board based on nomination by the Scout Group Council and recommendation by the relevant Scout County Commissioner. Membership also includes roles such as Chairperson, Secretary, Treasurer and Quartermaster, and adult representatives of all sections, and youth representatives of the Scouts, Venture Scout and Rover Scout sections, made by the Scout Group Council itself. In 2018, there were around 520 Scout Groups, while in 2020 there were 492.

=== Support structures ===
Scout Groups are members of their local Scout County, some are which based on the geographical counties of Ireland, while others, depending on membership density, are based in parts of cities or across county boundaries. The Scout County supports the training of Scouters, the youth programme, and the development of groups within the county. Each Scout County is coordinated by a County Commissioner. Above the Scout County level, Ireland is divided into six Scout Provinces. Each Province is coordinated by a Provincial Commissioner, A staff of administrative and support professionals are led by Scouting Ireland's chief executive officer and based in the national office at the Larch Hill campsite.

=== National Council ===
The National Council was the primary decision-making body of Scouting Ireland from 2004 to 2018 and met at least once a year. National Council was the body responsible for amendments to the movement's Rules and Constitution. It also elected the Chief Scout and national officers.

It was replaced with a company general meeting structure in October 2018.

=== Board of directors ===
The board of directors is the non-executive oversight body between general meetings of the company. From 2018, it consists of 10 elected members, and up to 3 co-opted members. It receives reports from Heads of Department and has the authority to create structures and appoint heads for those structures.

==== National Management Committee ====
From June 2003 until October 2018, the National Management Committee (NMC) was the executive body which guided the association between National Council meetings. It made decisions relating to policies and strategies, and their implementation on behalf of National Council. The NMC, which included National and Provincial Commissioners, also handled representation of the organisation both nationally and internationally. The NMC also drove development of both the youth programme and materials to support the management of adult members and other supporters.

The NMC had the same membership as the Board of the not-for-profit company acting for Scouting Ireland when appropriate. As of 2020 the association was in the process of merging with the company with the Board of Directors at the helm.

=== Chief Scout ===
The leader of the overall organisation is the Chief Scout, who is its leading volunteer and public representative, chairs general meetings and other bodies, and makes key awards. The Chief reports to the board of directors.

The first Chief Scout elected was Martin Burbridge, the former National Treasurer of Scouting Ireland (CSI). He was re-elected at National Council in 2007 for a second term which was due to end in 2010. For personal reasons Burbridge announced his resignation in August 2008, and the NMC elected Michael John Shinnick, the then Chief Commissioner for Adult Resources, as SI's second Chief Scout in September 2008. He was elected by National Council in March 2009, and again in 2012, for a term to end in 2015. Christy McCann was elected as SI's third Chief Scout in September 2015. McCann was elected unopposed for a second term in April 2018, serving until February 2021.

In May 2021, history was made when Jill Pitcher Farrell was elected as Chief Scout of Scouting Ireland. As a current Rover Scout, this was the first time that Scouting Ireland elected not only a female Chief Scout, but a Youth Member to this role. She was also the first to be elected at a company general meeting, rather than a National Council.

In September 2024, Eoin Callanan, a Scouter from Cork, was appointed as the Chief Scout of Scouting Ireland.

=== Youth participation in governance ===
A National Youth Forum is held each year with representatives from the Scout, Venture Scout and Rover Scout sections. Representatives debate motions relating to the running of the association and their own sections. Successful motions are carried forward to the relevant national bodies, including general meetings.

=== National policies ===
The organisation's governance is supported by a number of national policies, largely set by general meetings and overseen by the board of directors. In addition to policies on finance, personnel, uniforms and facilities, these include documents on the Youth Programme, adult resource management, and safeguarding.

The organisation maintains a risk management strategy and policy, an anti-fraud policy, a whistle blower policy, and a crisis management policy.

There are also policies on adults in Scouting, adults working with young people, and recognition for adult contributors.

Scouting Ireland maintains a Code of Good Practice, Garda vetting and Northern Ireland access policies, and guidance on reporting, social media and drug incidents.

== History ==
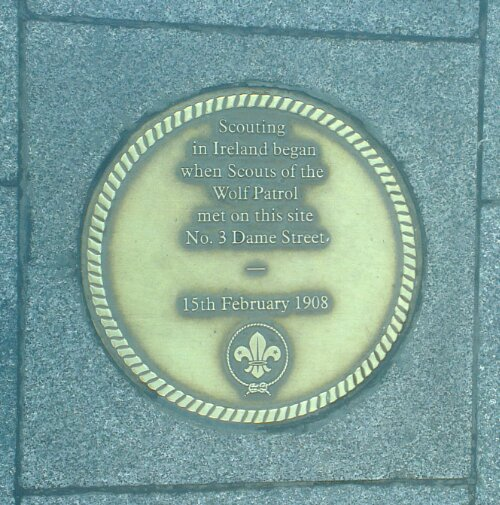
Plaque at 3 Dame Street, Dublin which marks the site of the first Scout meeting in Ireland

=== Roots ===
Scouting Ireland has its history in two legacy Scouting organisations — the Scout Association of Ireland (SAI), formerly known as the Boy Scouts of Ireland, and the Catholic Boy Scouts of Ireland (CBSI). The former traces its roots to 1908, and the latter was founded in 1927 – both trace their legacy to Lord Baden-Powell's Scout Movement.

By 1908, the influence of Baden-Powell's Scout Movement had spread from Great Britain to Ireland. The first recorded meeting of Scouts in Ireland took place at the home of Richard P. Fortune, a Royal Naval Volunteer Reservist, at 3 Dame Street, Dublin on 15 February 1908 where four boys were enrolled in the Wolf Patrol of the 1st Dublin Troop. The earliest known Scouting event in Ireland took place in the Phoenix Park in 1908 with members of the Dublin City Boy Scouts (later Scouting Ireland S.A.I.) taking part.

Because of the impacts to available adult leadership, the coming of the Great War in 1914 could have affected the viability of Scouting in Ireland. Scouts contributed to the war effort in several ways, with the Sea Scouts supporting the RN Coastguard.

In Dublin in the 1920s, two Roman Catholic priests, Fathers Tom and Ernest Farrell, followed the progress of Scouting. They noted that in other countries, the Catholic Church had taken up the idea of Scouting as a means of imprinting a Catholic ethos on young people. After some study and experimentation, they made a proposal to the Catholic Hierarchy of Ireland and were granted a constitution and Episcopal patronage in November 1926. Thus, the Catholic Boy Scouts of Ireland (CBSI) (Gasóga Catoilici na hÉireann) was created. CBSI would later become the largest Scout association on the island.

Although the two associations cooperated, particularly in international contexts, these two separate Scouting organisations (SAI and the much larger CBSI) operated as separate entities through the latter half of the 20th century.

=== 2004 Merger ===
On 1 January 2004, the two organisations were merged to form 'Scouting Ireland'. Each organisation had added 'Scouting Ireland' to their names in the decade before the merger. The merger was sanctioned in May 2003, when both associations agreed to join together to form a new single association. This in turn had followed from decisions in 1998 to set this process in motion.

The 2010s marked a period of sustained membership growth. As of February 2020, Scouting Ireland had over 45,000 members across the island of Ireland, including Northern Ireland, where it works in parallel with the Scout Association in Northern Ireland (SANI), which is part of The Scout Association in the United Kingdom. This number consists of 34,000 young people, and 11,000 adult volunteers. In 2019, the numbers were, over 38,000 were juvenile members, and 12,000 adult volunteers.

=== Controversies ===
Safeguarding issues resulted in controversy in 2017 and 2018.

==== 2015 death of scout ====
On 6 December 2015, on a Scouting Ireland visit to the coast, 14-year-old scout Aoife Winterlich was swept out to sea. She died four days later.

The visit was to Hook Head, County Wexford, during Storm Desmond. Scouting Ireland did not accept liability for Winterlich's death until 2024 when a case brought against them by Winterlich's mother was heard in Dublin Circuit Civil Court. The court found that Scouting Ireland should have accepted liability much sooner, and awarded €54,000 against the organisation.

==== 2017 review ====
In July 2017, Scouting Ireland commissioned a review of the handling of child protection cases, which included an initial check on a small sample of more serious allegations. Arising from this review, led by safeguarding specialist Ian Elliott, a recommendation was made in November 2017 that the files on all historic cases of alleged abuse be further checked, in particular to understand if persons against whom allegations were made were still active in the organisation. The review did not make any assessment of allegations, major or minor, but noted areas for improvement in handling such cases, such as "without prejudice" suspensions instead of the then-operational "voluntary stepping aside" approach, and a recommendation against lobbying by accusees, which it concluded was happening in some cases. It was also reported that there were sometimes tensions between professional staff and volunteers, with the former feeling pressure from volunteers, while some volunteers perceived "heavy-handed" treatment of some allegations.

The organisation made changes to its processes in response to the work of Elliott, including implementation of the "suspension without prejudice" concept, pending investigation, and plans for recruitment of a safeguarding co-ordinator and additional child-protection officers.

==== Funding suspension and officer changes ====
The historic handling of one case, dating back to 2009 and relating to allegation by a then-18 year old volunteer against an older volunteer, caused particular concern in public and governmental circles. This resulted, in April 2018, in the suspension of the remainder of Irish State funding pending discussions with the relevant department. With the State funding accounting for one third of the organisation's budget, the suspension had a serious effect. The Taoiseach, Leo Varadkar, commented on the handling of this case and the Irish Times published an editorial on the handling of related matters.

Also in mid-April 2018, four senior figures in Scouting Ireland voluntarily stepped away temporarily from their roles, pending a barrister-led review of governance and safeguarding standards. These were the Chief Scout, re-elected in early April 2018, two Chief Commissioners, and a member of National Management Committee.

==== Governance changes and funding restorations ====
The Minister for Children partially restored State funding in June 2018. Funding was again suspended when the Chief Scout was invited to chair an EGM called to reform governance structures, and again restored after the meeting voted in favour of proposed changes, and the entire board stood down, allowing a completely new board to be elected.

==== Cases raised, November 2018 ====
In November 2018 Scouting Ireland officials and the Minister for Children, Katherine Zappone noted to the relevant committee of the Oireachtas that a study of the organisation's records, and contacts from alleged victims, had revealed allegations related to abuse incidents, most notably from the 1960s to the 1980s. Most alleged abusers are dead, but where alleged abusers are living, Scouting Ireland has reported the allegations the Garda Síochána and Ireland's child protection agency, Tusla. To date, there was evidence of 108 alleged child sex abuse victims, from more than 400,000 members, and 71 alleged abusers (of whom 14 may have abused multiple children), out of more than 30,000 adult volunteers. Both records review and contacts are ongoing, and the numbers are likely to rise somewhat. The Minister noted that no alleged abuser is currently in Scouting Ireland.

==== 2020 sex abuse report ====
In 2019, Scouting Ireland commissioned Ian Elliot to undertake a "learning review" on the issue of sexual abuse within the organisation. The resulting report, titled "Historical Sexual Abuse in Scouting: A Learning Review", noted that the safety and wellbeing of young people had not always been prioritised "particularly through the eighties and nineties". The report found that there was "coverup and [..] a failure to report abuse". The full extent of abuse could not be determined as records were lost or destroyed.

The report stated that a "characteristic of the poor governance that existed in scouting was the existence of a culture driven by self-interest, with little attention paid to the young people involved". There report also noted that there appeared "to have been an almost complete absence of any concern for the young people that were abused" and that, where attempts were made to support abuse victims or those reporting abuse, it was "poorly recorded". The report criticised the emergence of small cliques which played too great a role in the operation of Scouting bodies. Adults with a sexual interest in young people sometimes rose to positions of power and influence and controlled any fledgling accountability processes, preventing known offenders from being removed. The report said "Cronyism thrived and remained a significant problem in scouting up to and including the reviewer's involvement with Scouting Ireland" (in 2017). It also said that the introduction of an accountability framework was resisted and that "Individuals, who were suspected or known to be sex offenders, gained positions of power and became largely impregnable".

In his Executive Summary, Ian Elliot said that the existence of a "negative culture driven by self-interest, along with poor governance structures [were] the main cause of the continuation of sexual abuse in scouting". He also wrote that independent monitoring of practise and strict adherence to robust accountability procedures are essential for Scouting Ireland to ensuring that the progress that Scouting Ireland made in this area continues.

He wrote that those who volunteer to be Scout leaders should realise that to be a volunteer is a privilege, and that volunteers should expect to have their behaviour scrutinised and commented upon. If a volunteer's behaviour falls below standards, they should be helped raise it above the standard, and if they cannot raise their behaviour that they should leave Scouting. If their behaviour is a risk to young people, this should be reported immediately to statutory authorities.

He also wrote that the protection of children is not just the duty of a professional safeguarding team, but of every adult in the organisation. He concluded that Scouting Ireland is a considerable organisation that makes a "valuable contribution to the lives of many in Ireland today", but that the organisation must learn from its history to eliminate abuse and mismanagement and that "The volunteer is not supreme. The young person is.".

In May 2020, the report was published by the organisation which confirmed that the Catholic Boy Scouts of Ireland (CBSI) and the Scout Association of Ireland (SAI), which merged to form Scouting Ireland in 2004, identified at least 275 known or suspected sex predators across the two organizations, mainly dating from the 1960s and 1990s. Scouting Ireland backed the findings of the report and issued an apology.

In 2021, a former CBSI Scout leader was jailed for sexual assaults that occurred during the 1980s, 1990s and early 2000s.

==== 2021 "No Confidence" motion ====
At the annual general meeting in 2021, the members approved a motion of no confidence in the board, with regard to the changes made since the change to a company-only structure.

== Campsites ==
Campsites and Scout centres in Scouting Ireland may be operated by local groups, with a number owned centrally and managed by the national organisation itself. Larch Hill in Tibradden, County Dublin, and Lough Dan near Roundwood, County Wicklow were inherited from Scouting Ireland (CSI) and Scouting Ireland S.A.I. as national campsites. Other nationally owned campsites include Mount Melleray Scout Centre in the Knockmealdown Mountains near Cappoquin, County Waterford and Castle Saunderson International Scouting Centre, a new campsite in County Cavan, as well as a water activity centre in Killaloe, County Clare. Locally run campsites include Kilcully, County Cork, Collon, County Louth, Dundrum International Scout Campsite, Dundrum, County Tipperary, Castleconnell Scout Campsite, County Limerick and Glendale Lodge, Glencree, Enniskerry, County Wicklow. Scouting Ireland have published a map of their campsite network including both national and local campsites.

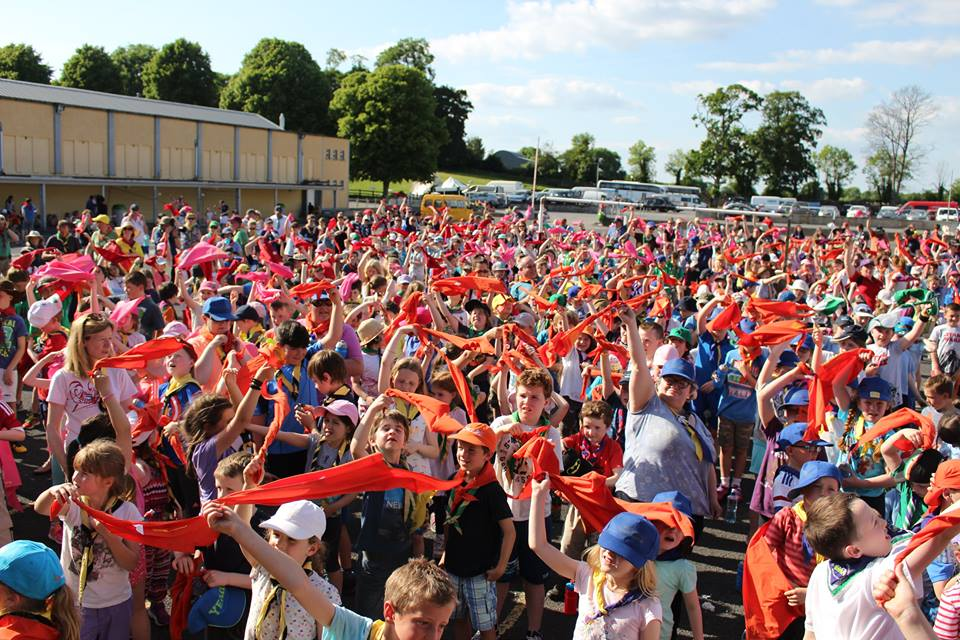
Beaver and Cub Scouts at Scouting Ireland JamÓige event 2016

== International participation ==
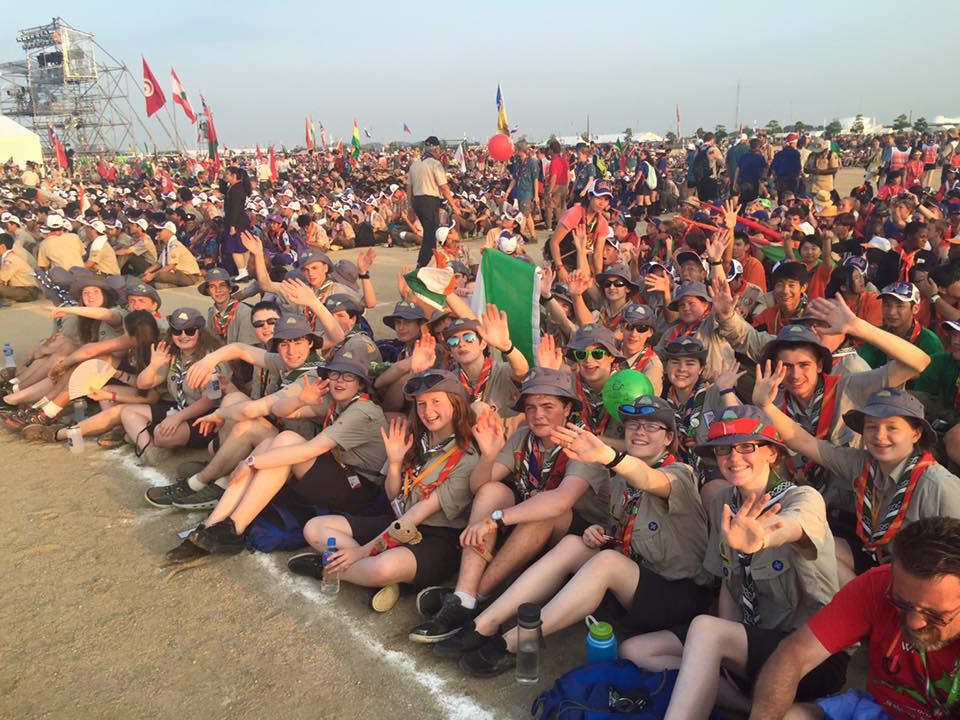
Irish Scouts at the 2015 World Scout Jamboree in Japan

The organisation and its legacy associations are represented in several international forums. Scouting Ireland is the sole World Organisation of the Scout Movement (WOSM)-recognised body in the Republic of Ireland, and works with the Scout Association in Northern Ireland. In 2014, Scouting Ireland won the bid to host the 16th World Scout Moot, which was intended to take place in 2021, but was cancelled due to the impact of the COVID-19 pandemic.

=== Memberships ===
In 1965, CBSI joined with SAI to form the Federation of Irish Scout Associations, FISA. Through FISA, Irish Scouts were able to play a full part in international Scouting. Prior to this, because the WOSM traditionally recognises only one Scouting body in each country, only SAI had been recognised by WOSM (since 1949).

=== Individual representation and recognition ===
A number of Irish people have held office at international level, including as Member (Eoghan Lavelle) and Chairman (Thérèse Birmingham) of the European Scout Committee. Both Jerry Kelly and Thérèse Birmingham have served as Vice Chairman of the World Scout Committee. Howard E. Kilroy served as Chairman of the World Scout Foundation's Investment Committee. In 2001 John Geoghegan was appointed director of the World Scout Foundation, a role he held until retirement. John Lawlor and Máire Fitzgerald served as Youth Advisors to the World Scout Committee.

Six Irish Scouts have been awarded World Scouting's only award, the Bronze Wolf Award by the World Scout Committee, Edward J. Montgomery (1977), Desmond Fay (1984), Jeremiah Kelly (1985), Howard Kilroy (2010), Therese Bermingham (2015), and Máire Fitzgerald (2023).

=== Jamborees ===
Scouting Ireland hosted Jamboree 2008, its first international Jamboree, from 2–10 August 2008. It was held at Punchestown Racecourse, County Kildare with the aim of celebrating one hundred years of Scouting in Ireland. Around 12,500 Irish and overseas Scouts attended the event. The next Scouting Ireland National Jamboree, "JamboRí 2018" was held in 2018 at Stradbally, County Laois, with 4,000 in attendance.

=== Partnerships ===
Scouting Ireland has a number of international partnerships, including with the Lesotho Scouts Association, and with Denmark's largest Scout Association, Det Danske Spejderkorps.

Created in 2012, the "Crean Challenge" is an annual partnership between Scouting Ireland and Bandalag íslenskra skáta (BIS), the Icelandic Boy and Girl Scout Association. Irish Scouts travel to Iceland to improve their winter skills, navigation and mountaineering. The challenge is named after Irish polar explorer, Tom Crean.

== See also ==
- Scouting in Northern Ireland
- Gaisce – The President's Award
