= Catholic Boy Scouts of Ireland =

Scouting Ireland (CSI)
- Headquarters: Larch Hill
- Country: Republic of Ireland, Northern Ireland
- Founded: 1927
- Defunct: 2003
- Affiliation: World Organization of the Scout Movement

The Catholic Boy Scouts of Ireland (CBSI; Irish: Gasóga Caitliceacha na hÉireann) was an Irish Catholic Scouting organisation active from 1927 until 2004, when it formed Scouting Ireland by merging with the former Scout Association of Ireland (SAI), a non-denominational Scout organisation. The CBSI changed its name to "Catholic Scouts of Ireland" (CSI) when it admitted girls and to "Scouting Ireland (CSI)" in the run-up to the foundation of Scouting Ireland. It was active in both the Republic of Ireland and Northern Ireland.

== History ==
Scouting in Ireland traces its roots to 1908 and the founding of the Scout Association of Ireland. As it was then part of the United Kingdom, and later the British Commonwealth, the SAI was affiliated to its British counterpart, the Scout Association, sharing a common Chief Scout in Robert Baden-Powell.

In 1925 and 1926, Father Ernest Farrell, a curate in Greystones, County Wicklow began working with a youth programme loosely modelled on the Scout method. Under the pen-name "Sagart", he wrote a series of articles in Our Boys, a magazine published by the Christian Brothers, advocating the formation of an official Catholic Scout organisation. This initial group, while more in line with the methods of the Boys' Brigade was viewed as an effective means of imprinting a Catholic ethos on the young men of Ireland. Father Farrell's brother, Father Tom Farrell, a curate in the Pro-Cathedral gave this fledgeling association the backing of the church and its resources. In 1927 the Catholic Boy Scouts of Ireland was officially founded, with a constitution drawn up and a headquarters from which the association could be organised, clothed and supplied.

At an early stage John O'Neill, a motor works proprietor and former member of Seanad Éireann who had been associated with Fr. Ernest's Greystones venture, became Chief Scout. A "national committee", the forerunner of the National Executive Board, was set up. Fr. Tom kept up constant contact with the hierarchy of the Catholic Church, and with the Dominicans, Franciscans, Carmelites, Passionists, Jesuits, Capuchins and other religious houses, all of which sponsored CBSI troops in Dublin at a very early period.

Scouts assisted during the 1929 Catholic Emancipation Celebrations in Dublin, directing traffic and treating injured people. They also assisted during the 1932 Eucharistic Congress Celebrations. 1,500 Scouts came to a general camp in Terenure for the week. Some five hundred Scouts assisted in the preparations for the arrival of the Cardinal Legate, for his reception at the Pro-Cathedral and at the garden party held in Blackrock College. Stewarding was undertaken by teams of Scouts at the mass meeting in the Phoenix Park, and first-aid posts were also staffed by trained Scouts. On the final Sunday 400 Scouts acted as guards at the High Altar in the Park and at O'Connell Bridge.

In 1934, led by Cardinal MacRory, Bishop Patrick Collier and the members of the Executive Board, a pilgrimage was organised to Rome in celebration of the Holy Year. 1200 Scouts sailed from Dublin aboard the liner RMS Lancastria. They were received in audience by Pope Pius XI, who inspected missionary outfits presented by the Scouts, examined the Troop Colours, and blessed a copy of the Scout Constitution. During the trip Sir Martin Melvin, owner of the English Catholic newspaper, The Universe, presented a trophy, subsequently named in his honour, aboard the S.S. Lancastria. This trophy was presented each year to the winners of the National Scout Campcraft Competition, the Melvin, which was held each August. Teams of 8 Scouts would compete in a range of different Scout activities. The last competition was held in 2003 at Mount Melleray Abbey in Waterford.

In 1965, the CBSI formed the Federation of Irish Scout Associations with the WOSM recognised Scout Association of Ireland. This allowed both associations access to the recognition and resources available through the world association. All Scouts in Ireland were thereafter able to play an active role in International Scouting.

In 1967, to celebrate its 40th birthday, the association held a National Camp at Lismore County Waterford attended by 3,500 Scouts. The Association's Golden Jubilee Year was marked in 1977 by events throughout the country, culminating in an International camp held in the grounds of Mount Melleray Abbey, Cappoquin, County Waterford.

A Jamboree, Portumna '85 was organised in 1985 by all Scouting Associations in Ireland (CBSI, SAI, and NISC) through the Federation of Irish Scout Associations. It was held in Portumna, County Galway to celebrate International Youth Year.

Jamborees were also subsequently held at Gosford Park, Gosford '89 in 1989 and Ballyfin in 1993.

In 1998, both the CBSI and the SAI voted to begin discussions to form a single, unified association. When, on 11 May 2003, the National Council of the association voted to form a single body with the second-largest Scout association on the island, it was a major departure in Irish Scouting. While close ties were always maintained with Scouting Ireland S.A.I., a divided approach to promoting Scouting was seen as a substantial impediment to the growth of the movement in Ireland. Its National Headquarters was at Larch Hill.

The CBSI ceased operations in 2003, allowing for the formation of Scouting Ireland.

In May 2020, it was revealed that prior to the 2004 merger with the SAI which formed Scouting Ireland, Catholic Boy Scouts of Ireland covered up sex abuse committed by people who served in the organization. In a period spanning decades, both the CBSI and SAI shielded 275 known or suspected predators who abused children after becoming aware of the reported acts of abuse. Scouting Ireland backed the findings of the report and issued an apology.

== Chief Scouts ==
- 1927–1930: Senator John O'Neill – The first Chief Scout of the Catholic Boy Scouts of Ireland served for over three decades.
- 1930–1962: Professor Joseph B. Whelehan – He arranged the purchase of the estate at Larch Hill which became the National Campsite and Headquarters after the move from Herbert Place.
- 1962–1970: Christopher J. "Kit" Murphy
- 1970–1974: Brig-Gen Patrick D. Hogan
- 1974–1980: James D. Hally – He was a member of the Scout Foundation, the trust company for the properties of Scouting Ireland and the curator of the Scout Museum at Mount Melleray Abbey Scout Centre until his death in 2005.
- 1980–1986: Joseph Lawlor – Joined Catholic Boy Scouts of Ireland within the 80th Coolock/Artane (St. Brendans) as Scout Master, Presided over the CBSI/SAI/SANI Jamboree hosted at Ballyfin, County Laois in 1993. Became Director of The National Scout Show from 1986 to 1992, and Director of The National Scout Show from 1998 to 2006. Alleged sex abuser.
- 1986–1992: Paul Ring – Joined Catholic Boy Scouts within the 66ú (Naomh Eoin Baiste, Cluain Tarbh) Unit as a Cub Scout, then became Cub Scout leader, area commissioner, Regional Commissioner, and then Chief Scout.
- 1992–1998: Joseph Lawlor - probation officer alleged to have abused children
- 1998–2004: Peter Dixon

== See also ==
- Irish Scout Jamboree
