= Finn River (County Fermanagh and County Monaghan) =

Small river in Ulster, Ireland

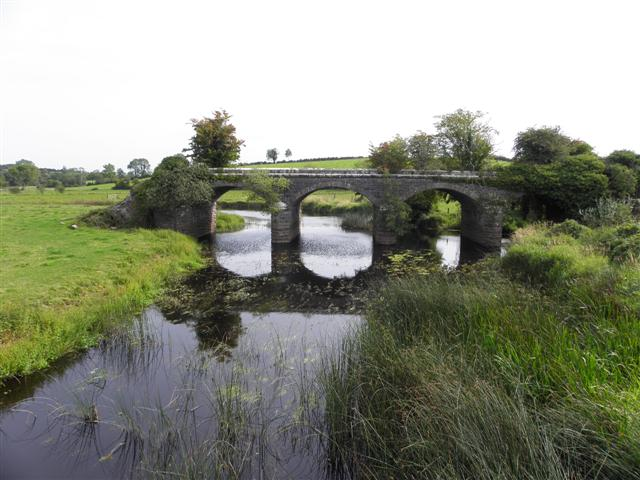
- The south-western stretch of the Finn River flowing under Annaghraw Railway Bridge, as photographed from Annaghmullin Bridge. County Fermanagh is on the left, while County Monaghan is on the right.
- Etymology: Irish: Finn, meaning 'Fair, Clear One', 'Bright One'
- Native name: Abhainn na Finne (Irish)

Location
- Jurisdictions: Northern Ireland and the Republic of Ireland
- Province: Ulster
- Counties: County Fermanagh, County Monaghan and County Cavan

Physical characteristics
- Source
  - location: Knoppane, a hill just north-west of Roslea in the south-east of County Fermanagh
- Mouth
  - location: Derrykerrib, near Wattlebridge, on Upper Lough Erne
  - coordinates: 54°08′30″N 7°22′18″W

Basin features
- River system: Erne
- Tributaries
  - right: Lackey River, which flows into the Finn just east of Annies Bridge

The Finn River (Irish: An Fhinn or Abhainn na Finne), also known as the River Finn, is a small river that flows through parts of County Fermanagh and parts of County Monaghan in the south of Ulster, the northern province in Ireland. In certain places, the river forms part of the boundary between County Fermanagh, which is part of Northern Ireland, and County Monaghan, which is part of the Republic of Ireland. Two very short stretches of the river, just north of Redhills and at Castle Saunderson, near Belturbet, also form part of the boundary between County Fermanagh and County Cavan (part of the Republic of Ireland). This means that some stretches of the river form part of the border between Northern Ireland and the Republic of Ireland, these short stretches also forming part of the external border of the European Union.

Some stretches of the river flow entirely within County Fermanagh, while other stretches flow entirely within County Monaghan. The river eventually flows into Upper Lough Erne, entering the lough very near Castle Saunderson. The Finn River should not be confused with the better known and much longer River Finn, which mainly flows through County Donegal in the west of Ulster.

== Course ==
The Finn River rises on the slopes of Knoppane, a hill just to the south of Slieve Beagh in the south-east of County Fermanagh. Knoppane is located a few miles north-west of Roslea, a village also in south-east Fermanagh. The Finn initially flows in a mainly easterly direction from its source, flowing through the Fermanagh townland of Cornacrieve, flowing past Derrygannon Community Hall, and flowing on to the east as far as the townland of Derryvollan (also spelled as Derryvullan). The river flows around the edges of Derryvollan, separating that Fermanagh townland from Cornaguillagh, Cornacreeve and Corrinshingo (also spelled as Corrinshigo), three townlands in the north-west of County Monaghan.

The Finn meanders around the eastern edge of Derryvollan, flowing under Derryvollan Bridge. From here on, the river flows in a mainly southerly direction. It meanders around both Rough Hill and Gola, two neighbouring townlands in the north-west of County Monaghan that are a short distance north-east of Roslea.

The river then flows back into Fermanagh, skirting around the north-western, western and southern edges of Roslea and along the western edge of Spring Grove Forest, crossing back into County Monaghan beside New Bridge. At a place between New Bridge and Aghafin House, the river meanders around a sharp bend, flowing in a south-easterly direction for almost two miles, entirely within County Monaghan, between the townland of Aghafin, just north-east of Clones, and the townland of Nook, just south-east of Stonebridge. Thereafter, the river mainly flows in a south-westerly direction, all the way to its mouth on Upper Lough Erne.

The river flows through Stonebridge, a hamlet in West Monaghan. It flows along the western edge of Conaghy, a townland south-east of Stonebridge, flowing near the probable site of Conaghy Castle, a former stronghold of the Mac Mathghamhna (MacMahon) dynasty. The Finn then flows on through Analore, another hamlet in West Monaghan, flowing quite close to Ballynure House, a now ruined Late Georgian former residence just outside Analore. The river flows to the south of Clones, the main town in West Monaghan. It then flows just to the north and north-west of the Hilton Demesne, near the village of Scotshouse, also in West Monaghan. This south-western stretch of the river, near the Hilton Demesne, forms another part of the boundary between County Fermanagh and County Monaghan, this stretch separating south-east Fermanagh from West Monaghan.

The Finn flows on through Wattlebridge, a hamlet in the south-east of County Fermanagh, then enters Upper Lough Erne nearby. The river enters the lough directly opposite Derrykerrib (Irish: Doire Choirb or Doire Ceirbe), a townland in south-east Fermanagh that was formerly an island, almost 5.3 miles (around 8.5 kilometres) south-west from Clones. The river flows into a narrow channel of the lough at this place, where the townland of Edergool (Irish: Eadarghabhail, meaning 'Between Forking Streams' or 'Between (Stream) Forks') in County Fermanagh meets the townland of Castlesaunderson Demesne, where Castle Saunderson is located, in County Cavan. Thus, half of the river's mouth is in County Fermanagh, while the other half is in County Cavan.

The river's mouth, which is at the edge of the Castle Saunderson Demesne, is also very near the Lanesborough Demesne, a former demesne in the townland of Quivvy on the County Cavan shore of Upper Lough Erne. The Lanesborough Demesne, near Belturbet, is directly opposite the north-western shore of Derrykerrib. Traditionally, the Finn River was considered navigable for most of the year by certain types of river boat, from its mouth upstream as far as Cumber Bridge in Coolnalong (Irish: Cúil na Long), a townland located between Scotshouse and Clones. The river meanders significantly throughout most of its course.

== Drummully ('the Sixteen Townlands') ==
The south-western part of the Finn River cuts Drummully off from the rest of County Monaghan. Drummully, also known as 'the Sixteen Townlands' or 'Coleman's Island', is a small district that is a pene-enclave of County Monaghan (part of the Republic of Ireland) almost entirely surrounded by County Fermanagh (part of Northern Ireland). Only a tiny stretch of the Finn River flows through Drummully, the river flowing along the southern edge of Annaghraw, a townland in the far south of the district. All roads leading into the district of Drummully go via County Fermanagh. The Cavan Road, also known locally as 'the Concession Road' (part of the N54 / A3), the main Cavan Town to Clones road, also runs through Drummully.

The Civil Parish of Drummully (Dartree Portion) is co-extensive with the district of Drummully, this civil parish being entirely within County Monaghan. However, the Parish of Drummully in the Church of Ireland Diocese of Clogher covers a much larger area than the district of Drummully, as did the former Parish of Drummully in the Catholic Diocese of Clogher. The Catholic Parish of Drummully was absorbed into the Parish of Clones in either the late nineteenth century or the early twentieth century. The district and the various types of parish (both civil and ecclesiastical) are named after the Drummully Monastic Site. This monastic site and ruined former parish church are on a hilltop in the townland of Drummully, just inside County Fermanagh, very near Wattlebridge. The townland of Drummully is on the south-western edge of the district of Drummully.

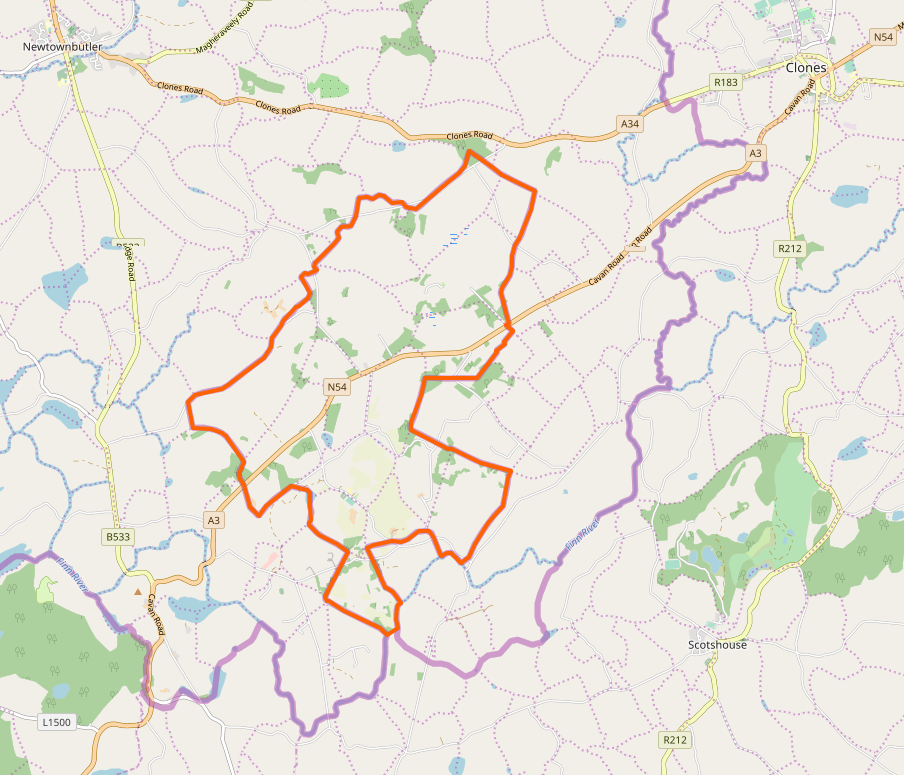
Map showing the district of Drummully, also known as 'the Sixteen Townlands'. The boundaries of the district are outlined in red, with the rest of the County Fermanagh-County Monaghan border being outlined in purple. The district is almost entirely surrounded by County Fermanagh. The Finn River cuts the district off from the rest of County Monaghan.

== Bridges ==
The Finn River passes under numerous bridges on its way to Upper Lough Erne. Most of these bridges were built in the mid- to late eighteenth century or sometime in the nineteenth century, and almost all of them are built of stone. The following bridges are listed in order, going from the river's source to the river's mouth.

=== Source to Roslea ===
Between its source and Roslea, the Finn passes under a number of bridges. These include: Derrygannon Bridge, right beside Derrygannon Community Hall, located about 3 miles north-west of Roslea, which carries the Eshnadarragh Road across the Finn; and Derryvollan (also spelled as Derryvullan) Bridge, located a few miles north-north-east of Roslea, which carries the Deerpark Road across the Finn from County Fermanagh into County Monaghan. Derryvollan Bridge, which is also known as Flynn's Bridge, is located a short distance south-west of Knockatallon, a hamlet in the north-west of County Monaghan. Corragunt Bridge, which does not cross the Finn, is just north-west of Derryvollan Bridge.

Lisnawesnagh Bridge, which is constructed of stone, is located just north-east of Roslea and also carries the Deerpark Road across the Finn. There are three bridges on the edge of Roslea itself, a village surrounded on three sides by the Finn. These Roslea bridges, all of which are built of stone, include the bridge on the southern edge of Roslea which carries the Mullanahinch Road (the sideroad to Clones) across the Finn River.

=== Roslea to Cumber Bridge ===
New Bridge, a small concrete bridge built in the twentieth century, is located just over a mile south-south-west of Roslea. This bridge is on the south-western edge of Spring Grove Forest and carries the Clogh Road across the Finn. The Clogh Road joins the Mullanahinch Road (the Roslea to Clones road) beside this bridge. New Bridge is located only a few hundred yards from County Fermanagh's boundary with County Monaghan. The Finn River flows into West Monaghan immediately south of New Bridge.

A small sideroad known locally as 'the Gorry Lane' is beside New Bridge, part of the 'lane' being on the edge of Spring Grove Forest. This 'lane' runs up over the drumlins overlooking the Finn River, running from New Bridge to a junction on the sideroad between Clogh and Stonebridge; thus, 'the Gorry Lane' crosses from County Fermanagh into County Monaghan. The 'lane' runs just to the west and south of Rathkeevan Lough.

The Finn flows under Stone Bridge, built in the early nineteenth century and located in the hamlet of Stonebridge, between Clones and Smithborough in West Monaghan. This bridge carries the N54 (the main Cavan Town to Monaghan Town road) across the river.

The Finn also flows under an aqueduct just south-east of Stonebridge. This aqueduct, which crosses from the townland of Conaghy to the townland of Gransha Beg, is built of stone and carries the now largely derelict Ulster Canal across the river. Part of the aqueduct is now used as a road bridge, carrying a narrow sideroad across the Finn. Conaghy Castle, formerly a Mac Mathghamhna (MacMahon) fortification, was probably quite close to the river at this point, the 'castle' almost certainly having been on a small hill overlooking the site of the later aqueduct. This 'castle' was probably a Gaelic towerhouse of some sort. Nothing now remains above ground of Conaghy Castle.

The river then passes under Annamakiff Bridge, which was constructed c. 1930 and is built of concrete. It then flows under Analore Bridge, parts of which date from c. 1720. This bridge is located in the hamlet of Analore, between Clones and Newbliss, and carries the R183 across the river. The Finn flows under the now derelict Annaghkilly Railway Bridge, located close to the former Ballynure Demesne, immediately south of Analore. This bridge was built in the late 1850s and is constructed of stone. It carried the Dundalk and Enniskillen Railway across the Finn, carrying the railway from the townland of Ballynure across to the southern part of the townland of Annaghkilly.

The river flows under Scarvy Bridge, a humpback bridge constructed c. 1820 and built of stone. It then flows under Cumber Bridge, which was constructed c. 1800 and is also built of stone. Cumber Bridge is located between Clones and Scotshouse, and carries the main Clones to Ballyhaise road (part of the R212) across the river.

=== Cumber Bridge to the Derrykerrib Bridges ===
After Cumber Bridge, the Finn flows under Annies Bridge, which crosses from County Fermanagh to County Monaghan very near the Hilton Demesne, just outside Scotshouse. Annies Bridge is almost 2.8 miles (around 4.5 kilometres) south-south-west of Clones. The river then flows under Ballyhoe Bridge, which is on a sideroad between Redhills and Clones and crosses the river just inside Fermanagh, not far from Clogher Market.

The Finn then flows under Annaghraw Railway Bridge and Finn Bridge, two Victorian bridges which stand right beside each other. These bridges cross from County Fermanagh into County Monaghan; however, both are located very close to Redhills, a village in County Cavan. Annaghraw Railway Bridge is a now ruined structure that was built in the late 1850s or early 1860s. It formerly carried the Clones and Cavan Extension Railway (the main railway line from Clones to Cavan Town) across the river. This railway line closed in the late 1950s. Finn Bridge, also known as Annaghmullin Bridge, is a road bridge and was built in the late 1850s.

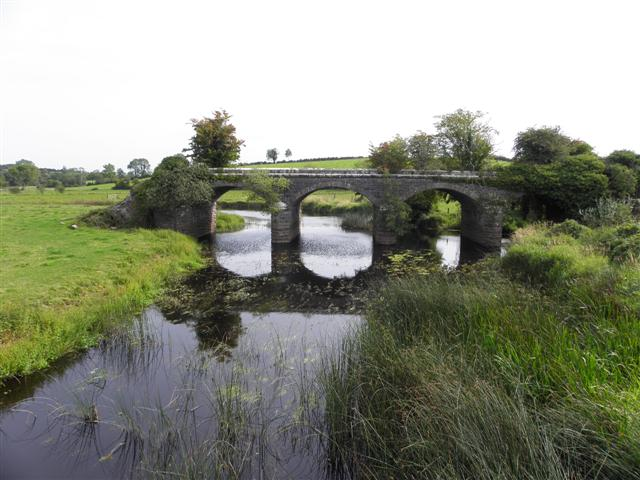
The former Annaghraw Railway Bridge, as photographed from Annaghmullin Bridge. The Finn River can be seen flowing under the ruined bridge, with County Fermanagh on the left and County Monaghan on the right. Parts of the river now form a tiny part of the external border of the European Union.

Gortnacarrow Bridge, which was built in the mid-eighteenth century, carries the Cavan Road (also known as 'the Concession Road', part of the A3) over the Finn near Wattlebridge. The bridge at Wattlebridge itself, very near the mouth of the river, carries the Wattlebridge Road (the B533) across the Finn. All these bridges are built of stone.

There are two bridges at Derrykerrib, both of which are modern, concrete structures, located slightly to the north of the Finn River's mouth. These bridges are right beside each other, the older of the two dating from the late twentieth century, while the newer bridge was completed in 2018. These bridges carry the Derrykerrib Road from Edergool, a townland on the Fermanagh 'mainland', across a narrow channel of Upper Lough Erne and onto Derrykerrib, a townland that was formerly an island. A new navigation channel was also cut in 2017 and 2018, when the new Derrykerrib Bridge was being built. The new bridge spans this channel, which was cut on the Derrykerrib shore of Upper Lough Erne. This new channel allows boats to sail, via the Finn River, as far as the jetty at Castle Saunderson in County Cavan. The entrance to the now derelict Ulster Canal is beside the Derrykerrib Bridges, being just north of them.

== Other nearby bridges ==
The following are bridges that do not actually cross the Finn River, but are located very near to the river. They are listed in order, going from the river's source towards the river's mouth.

=== Corragunt Bridge ===
Corragunt (also spelled as Carragunt) Bridge crosses from County Fermanagh into County Monaghan and is located only a few miles from the source of the Finn River. The bridge does not actually span the river, being situated a short distance to the north of the Finn. The bridge is just over a mile south-west of Knockatallon, a hamlet in the north-west of County Monaghan, and carries a sideroad called the Corragunt Road across a small stream. This stream, which is part of the county boundary between County Fermanagh and County Monaghan, flows into the Finn River a short distance to the south of Corragunt Bridge. The current bridge was constructed in the late 1990s and has a Republican memorial built into it.

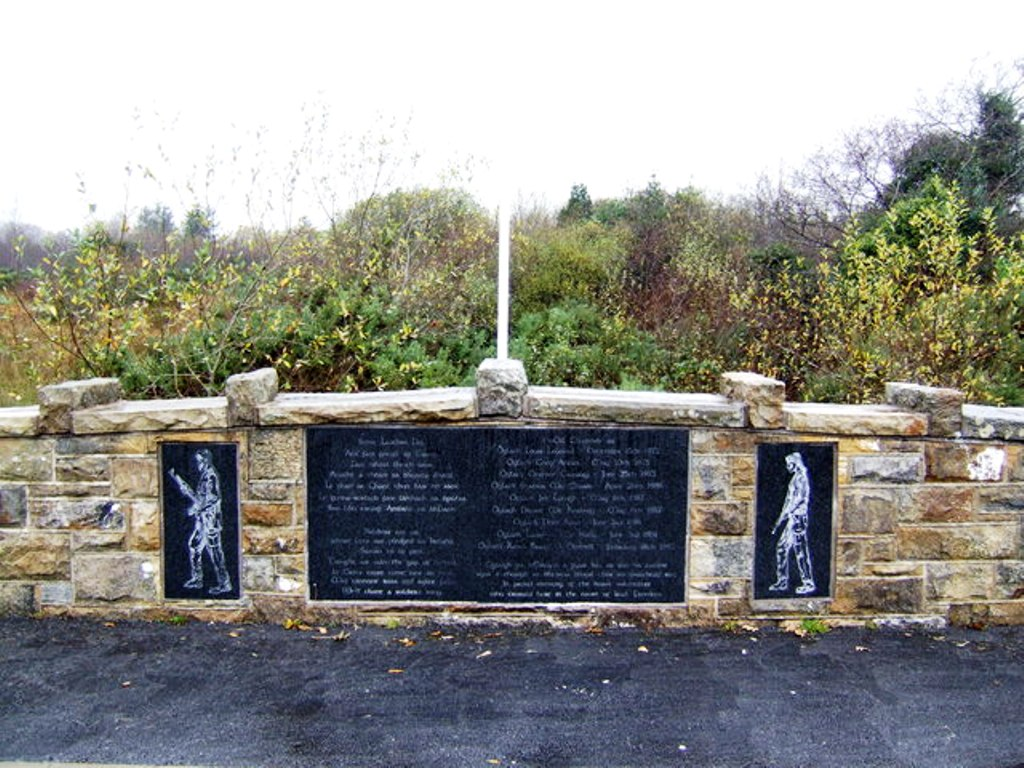
Photograph of the Republican memorial on Corragunt Bridge.

=== Ballynure Viaduct ===
Ballynure Viaduct is located immediately south of Analore, a hamlet in West Monaghan. This small railway viaduct, now derelict, is on the edge of the Ballynure Demesne, a former demesne that surrounds Ballynure House, which is also derelict. The current viaduct was built in the 1920s, largely replacing a Victorian viaduct that had been built in the 1850s on the same site. The viaduct formerly carried the Dundalk and Enniskillen Railway across a small ornamental lake beside the main entrance into the demesne. While the viaduct does not cross the Finn River, it is located very close to the river. Ballynure Viaduct is only a short distance to the east of Annaghkilly Railway Bridge, the structure that actually carried the railway across the river. On the opposite side of the river from Ballynure are the remains of Annaghkilly Viaduct.

=== Annaghkilly Viaduct ===
The remains of Annaghkilly Viaduct are just west of the Finn River, being on the western side of the nearby Annaghkilly Railway Bridge. The viaduct formerly carried the Dundalk and Enniskillen Railway across the southern part of the townland of Annaghkilly, just south-west of Analore. The current viaduct was built in the 1920s, at the same time as Ballynure Viaduct, on the site of an earlier viaduct. Like Ballynure Viaduct, which is very nearby, Annaghkilly Viaduct did not cross the river. Most of Annaghkilly Viaduct was dismantled shortly after the railway closed in the late 1950s. Only the steel piers of the viaduct remain standing today.

=== Nancy's Bridge ===
Not far from both Annaghraw Railway Bridge and Annaghmullin Bridge is Nancy's Bridge, a road bridge in the townland of Annaghraw in the district of Drummully, County Monaghan. Nancy's Bridge was built in the late 1850s or early 1860s and carried a sideroad over the Cavan Town to Clones railway line, very near the Finn River.

== Ulster Canal ==
The most south-western stretch of the Ulster Canal runs very close to the Finn River, from just south of Stonebridge in West Monaghan all the way to near Wattlebridge in south-east Fermanagh, with the canal running via Clones. The canal was largely built between 1830 and 1841. In places, the now mainly derelict and disused canal runs right alongside the river, being carried across the river on an aqueduct at one location. This aqueduct, which is used as a road bridge nowadays, runs from the townland of Conaghy to the townland of Gransha Beg, just south-east of Stonebridge. The Upper Lough Erne entrance to the canal is on a narrow channel of the lough at Edergool, a townland in the south-east of County Fermanagh that is directly opposite the townland of Derrykerrib. The canal entrance is right beside the Derrykerrib Bridges, being just to the north of the bridges, only a short distance to the north of the Finn River's mouth. The Ulster Canal was closed in 1931.

== Drummully Church, Graveyard and Monastic Site ==
On a small hilltop overlooking the south-western end of the Finn River, very near Wattlebridge, is Drummully Monastic Site. The site, which is in the townland of Drummully and is just inside County Fermanagh, is right beside Clogher Market, being very close to Gortnacarrow Bridge. The church here was probably dedicated to Saint Mochomma originally, and was later under the authority of the Ó Gabhann (O'Gowan or Goan) dynasty, who held the hereditary position of airchinnech (erenagh) of this area in later Gaelic times. An Early Christian site, Drummully later developed into a small monastery and parish church in the Medieval Era. The church on the site was ruined by the early 1620s. The site has been used as a graveyard for several centuries, while what remains of the medieval church on this site has long been in ruins. The Parish of Drummully and the district of Drummully are named after this monastic site.

Nearby are the two 'successor churches' of the original Drummully Church. Both these Victorian churches were completed in 1844 and are just inside County Monaghan. St. Alphonsus's Church is in an area known as the Connons, and was built in the early 1840s, just before the outbreak of the Great Famine. This church, often known locally as Connons Chapel, was built in a version of the Gothic Revival style and is the modern-day local Catholic church. Built as a parish church, Connons Chapel ceased to have this status when the Catholic Parish of Drummully was absorbed into the Parish of Clones in either the late nineteenth century or the early twentieth century. The Parish of Clones is part of the Catholic Diocese of Clogher, just like the former Parish of Drummully was.

A short distance away, in the townland of Clonooney in County Monaghan, is St. Mary's Church, the modern-day parish church for the Parish of Drummully in the Church of Ireland Diocese of Clogher. This Gothic Revival church was also built in the early 1840s, and is located right alongside the N54. St. Mary's is also known as Drummully Church of Ireland Church or Drummully Parish Church. Connons Chapel and St. Mary's Church are both within the Drummully pene-enclave.
