= Drummully =

Electoral district and pene-enclave in County Monaghan, Ireland

Coordinates: 54°8′35″N 7°18′35″W

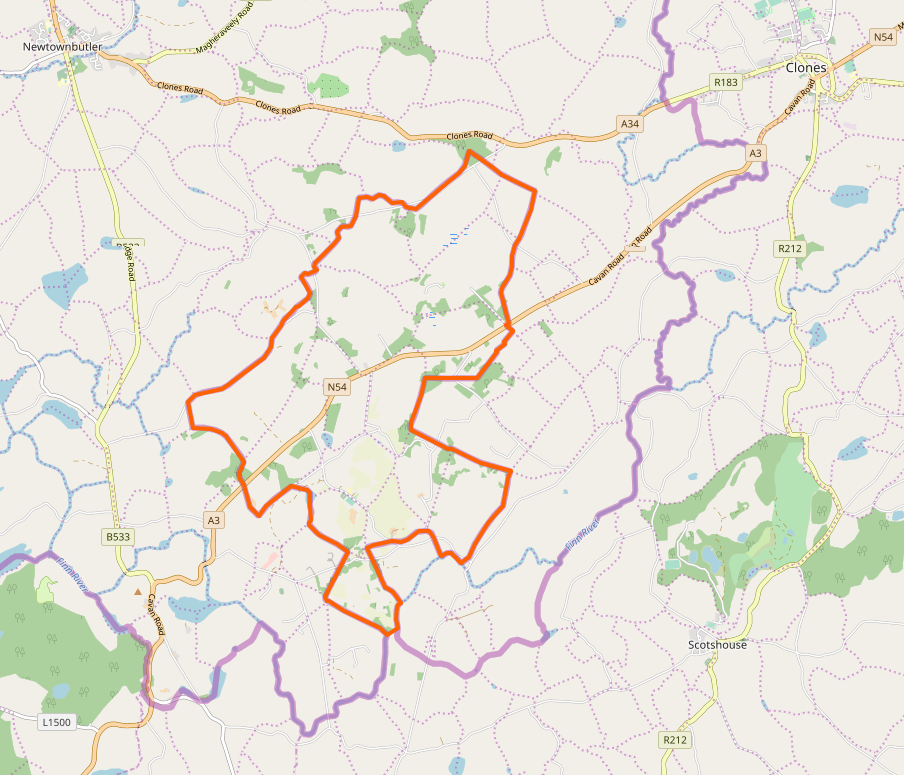
Boundary of Drummully electoral division in red, and the rest of the County Fermanagh-County Monaghan border in violet

Drummully or Drumully (Irish: Droim Ailí; "rocky ridge") is an electoral division (ED) in the west of County Monaghan in Ireland. Often known as the Sixteen Townlands to locals and as Coleman's Island or the Clonoony Salient to the security forces, it is a pene-enclave almost completely surrounded by County Fermanagh in Northern Ireland. Since the establishment of the Irish Free State in 1922 (following the partition of Ireland in 1921), the Fermanagh–Monaghan border has formed part of the international border between the United Kingdom and what is now the Republic of Ireland, leaving Drummully as a practical enclave, connected to the rest of County Monaghan, and thus to the rest of the Republic, only by an unbridged 110-metre (360 ft) length of the Finn River. The area is accessed via the Clones–Butlersbridge road, numbered the N54 in the Republic and the A3 in Northern Ireland. The hamlet of Wattlebridge is just outside the Drummully enclave, being on the south-western edge of the enclave.

The civil parish of Drummully includes the Monaghan ED of the same name and the surrounding parts of Fermanagh; the townland of Drummully, with the ruins of the medieval parish church, lies in the Fermanagh portion of the parish. The two County Fermanagh EDs separating Drummully from the Republic are Clonkeelan to the east and Derrysteaton to the southwest. The Connons is a name given sometimes to Drummully ED, and sometimes to the entire district between Clones and Redhills, County Cavan, encompassing Clonkeelan, Drummully, and Derrysteaton. Connons Catholic Church (also known as Connons Chapel) and Connons community hall are in Drummully ED.

== History ==
The area's unusual border was ascribed in the 1920s to "some long forgotten feud between petty kings". Drummully ED lies in the province of Ulster near the tripoint of three counties, Monaghan, Fermanagh, and Cavan, which were created in the 1580s from three medieval Gaelic lordships: respectively Airgíalla (McMahon's country), Fear Manach (Maguire's country) and East Breifne (O'Reilly's country). These lordships had been divided into túatha, subdivided into bailte biataigh ("ballybetaghs") and "tates". In the 15th century the Mac Domhnaill (MacDonnells (Note: Not to be confused with the Scottish MacDonnells who came later as gallowglasses.) or MacDonalds) were former rulers of the túath of Clann Ceallaigh, allied to the McMahons of the túath of Dartraighe to the southeast, and pressed by Maguire expansion from the northwest. The Mac Domhnaill were gradually concentrated in the ballybetagh of Ballyconinsi, (Note: Also spelt Balleneconnishe, Bellacunnedge, Balleconyushe, Ballycovench, or Ballycovenghe.) whose extent corresponds with that of Drummully ED. Coininse "Hound Island" is the origin of [the] Connons and Ballyconinsi (baile + Coininse); according to Nollaig Ó Muraíle, it is unclear precisely where the island is or was; John O'Donovan said in 1848 that it was a townland "now divided into several sub-denominations". Most of the 16 townlands now in the Drummully ED can be identified among the 16 tates listed in the ballybetagh of Ballyconinsi in records of 1591, 1606, and 1610.

The Tudor conquest of Ireland proceeded by surrender and regrant, whereby a Gaelic lord would surrender sovereignty to the English monarch as monarch of Ireland, and be regranted title to the land under common law. The 1580s shiring of Ulster proceeded on that basis, with McMahon's country becoming County Monaghan, within which Dartraighe became the barony of Dartree; likewise Clann Ceallaigh became Clankelly barony in County Fermanagh. Ballyconinsi was shired with the McMahons rather than their enemies, the Maguires. Most of the Gaelic proprietors in these counties forfeited their lands after the Nine Years' War or the Rebellion of 1641. In 1640, most of Ballyconinsi was owned by "Jacob Leirrey, Esq[uire], Eng[lish] Protestant", with small tracts retaining Gaelic owners.

Until 1836, a change to the 1580s boundaries would have required an Act of the Irish Parliament (to 1800) or the UK Parliament (1801–1922). While the Valuation of Lands (Ireland) Act 1836 facilitated transfer of exclaves (as of Gubdoo from Dartree to Coole, County Fermanagh in 1842) it did not apply to pene-exclaves. Electoral divisions were introduced with the Poor Relief (Ireland) Act 1838 as electoral areas for the boards of guardians of the new Poor Law Unions (PLUs); Drummully ED was within Clones PLU and initially included most of the parish of Drummully, but in 1877 it was redrawn with its current boundaries. The Local Government Board for Ireland was empowered to adapt county boundaries for the Local Government (Ireland) Act 1898, but Drummully was left unchanged, and elected two councillors by plurality block voting to Clones No. 1 rural district council (RDC). In the 1911 local elections, all seats in Clones No. 1 were uncontested except for Drummully, where the vote count was: John Winters (Nationalist, outgoing) 48; John Murtagh (Nationalist, outgoing) 47; James Hyde (Unionist) 47; Thomas Nesbitt (Unionist) 47. Hyde won the second seat by lot. Drummully ED was last used as an electoral area in the 1914 local election. The Local Government (Ireland) Act 1919 mandated the single transferable vote, which needed multi-seat local electoral areas (LEAs) formed by combining single-seat EDs. Since then, EDs have no independent uses but remain legally defined areas used as references for specifying the makeup of larger units, or the location of smaller ones.

1925 Irish Boundary Commission:
- dashed line is the 1920 border, which remains unchanged
- solid line is Commission's abandoned proposal, transferring the northern tip of Drummully to County Fermanagh in Northern Ireland, with most of Derrysteaton to the west and Clonkeelan to the east transferred to County Monaghan in the Irish Free State.

The Government of Ireland Act 1920 attempted to answer the "Irish question" within the United Kingdom of Great Britain and Ireland, by grouping the counties into separate home rule jurisdictions of Northern Ireland and Southern Ireland, with Fermanagh in the former and Monaghan in the latter. This only took practical effect in Northern Ireland, as it was enacted during the Irish War of Independence. Following the 1921 Anglo-Irish Treaty, Southern Ireland was succeeded by a dominion called the Irish Free State with a provisional border with Northern Ireland subject to change by an Irish Boundary Commission. Protestant unionists owned most of the land in Drummully but were a minority of the population. Submissions to the boundary commission from unionists (including Fermanagh County Council and the Church of Ireland parish of Drummully) proposed to resolve the inconvenience of the locality's sinuous border by transferring Drummully ED to Northern Ireland, while those from nationalists (including Clones urban district council and the Free State government) proposed transferring all, or at least adjoining parts, of Fermanagh to the Free State. Nationalist and unionist locals both submitted that they would rather the area were entirely on the "wrong" side of the border than preserve the status quo. The commission's 1925 report proposed straightening the border by transferring Drummully ED's northernmost 14% (336 acres (136 ha); population 51) to Northern Ireland, and 18,623 acres (7,536 ha) (population 3,808) of adjoining Clonkeelan and Derrysteaton EDs from Fermanagh to the Free State. The Clones–Butlersbridge road, the Ulster Canal, and the railway line between Clones and Redhills would each have been entirely south of the border instead of crossing it four times (the canal forming the border for several hundred yards). However, the report as a whole proved so controversial that publication was suppressed and it was never implemented.

Drummully was, and is, inaccessible by road from the rest of County Monaghan except through County Fermanagh in Northern Ireland, part of the United Kingdom. It was not policed until May 1924, when the Garda Síochána were allowed to pass through County Fermanagh in Northern Ireland, by which time poteen making was rife. The Church of Ireland parish of Drummully had its rectory in County Fermanagh and its church in County Monaghan; for some years after partition, marriages solemnised there were not registered with the Dublin authorities. There were customs posts at the main Irish border crossings, but none around Drummully: the N54/A3 was a "concession road" such that journeys beginning and ending in the same jurisdiction did not require any border formalities, while the other crossings were "unapproved roads" where spot checks on traffic might confiscate transported goods presumed to be smuggled. The border runs down the middle of a minor road in the north of Drummully. The Royal Ulster Constabulary (RUC), during the IRA "border campaign" of the 1950s, and the British Army from 1971 during the Troubles, blocked the unapproved roads into Drummully with reinforced concrete blocks, metal spikes and craters, to prevent the area being used as a redoubt by Irish republican paramilitaries. The IRA had several safe houses in the area, three of which were burned by loyalist paramilitaries from Fermanagh in December 1973 and January 1974, including Clonoony House, a disused Georgian mansion. The Irish government gave the British military permission, renewed annually, to overfly the area "to facilitate the transport of men and materials, the evacuation of casualties and, in particular, the shadowing of suspect vehicles". Irish security forces were not permitted to travel through Northern Ireland in uniform, and "[t]he only route for armed gardai or army would appear to be by helicopter", using the Irish Air Corps helicopter based at Monaghan town. Local TD Jimmy Leonard complained in 1974 of concomitant lawlessness, while in 1980 there were fears that the Air Corps helicopter might be shot down by republicans mistaking it for an RAF aircraft. These blockages were removed by the 1990s peace process. Since then, the post-1992 European Single Market and the post-1952 Common Travel Area between Ireland and the UK have made the border "invisible". Nevertheless, when 2010 budget cuts deprived Clones Garda station of its unmarked car, officers could no longer drive to Drummully. In 1998–9, Drummully Church of Ireland church was subject to three vandalism attacks, ascribed by some locals to sectarianism.

The prospect of Brexit has uncertain impact on the border; an "Irish backstop" to preserve an invisible border was included in the November 2018 Brexit withdrawal agreement which the UK parliament rejected in 2019; the October 2019 agreement includes a similar arrangement, subject to ratification by Westminster, subsequent EU–UK implementation agreements, and possible future termination by cross-community vote of the Northern Ireland Assembly. International coverage of Brexit has often mentioned Drummully as a place especially sensitive to these issues.

== Statistics ==
Townlands in Drummully ED, (Note: These tables relate to the 16 townlands which have been in Drummully ED since 1877; before then 8 of the townlands were in Clonkeelan ED, while Drummully ED contained 23 townlands in Fermanagh.) Co. Monaghan
Name	Area		Population		
Name	ac	ha	1841	1911	2016
Annaghraw	112	45	87	39	(Note: Population of either two people or one gender, not stated for privacy.)
Clonfad	248	101	142	46	0
Clonkeelan	230	93	169	35	9
Clonlura	137	55	108	42	17
Clonnagore	166	67	102	46	22
Clonnestin	173	70	115	24	
Clonoony	213	86	86	37	
Clonoula	236	95	131	36	7
Clonrye	78	32	89	12	0
Clonshanvo	101	41	56	20	
Clontask	84	34	47	10	
Coleman	166	67	65	23	
Corvaghan	170	69	89	28	
Derrybeg	54	22	8	3	0
Drumsloe	122	49	178	23	18
Roranna	136	55	80	25	
Total	2,377	962	1,552	449	113
Total	(Note: Total area of 962 ha is from 2016 census. The townland areas from the 1911 census total 2424 ac 3 r 13 p (981.29 ha).)		1,552	449	113

Population of Drummully ED at each census
Date	Pop.	Ref.
1841	1,552	
1851	946	
1861	957	
1871	744	
1881	661	
1891	595	
1901	537	
1911	449	
1926	390	
1936	366	
1946	346	
1951	326	
1956	279	
1961	221	
1966	194	
1971	160	
1979	140	
1981	128	
1986	131	
1991	120	
1996	98	
2002	102	
2006	92	
2011	98	
2016	113	
2022	136	
