= Finn Bridge =

Coordinates: 54.1151°N 7.3155°W

Finn Bridge, also known as Annaghmullin Bridge, is a bridge built in 1856 that connects County Monaghan in the Republic of Ireland to County Fermanagh in Northern Ireland. It spans the Finn River (a tributary of the River Erne which is not to be confused with the River Finn in County Donegal). The bridge is close to Laurel Hill, a crossroads in the west of County Monaghan that is near the villages of Scotshouse (in County Monaghan) and Redhills (in County Cavan).

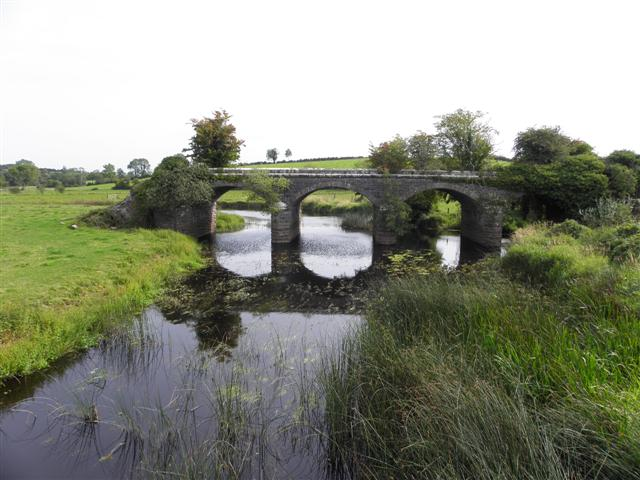
Annaghraw (railway) Bridge is a disused bridge on the former Clones and Cavan Extension Railway, visible just to the east of Finn (road) Bridge

Finn Bridge is a border crossing between the Republic and the North. It was used by Gardaí, RUC and also the Irish and British armies during "The Troubles". The bridge was closed to vehicles in the 1970s, when the British Army fixed concrete pillars onto the middle of it. This was intended to prevent the IRA from moving easily between the two areas. The only way across was by walking through the gaps between the pillars. Since the Northern Ireland peace process, the bridge has been reopened to vehicular traffic. The bridge is on one of a small number of road routes used to access Drummully (also known as Coleman's Island or 'the Sixteen Townlands'), a pene-enclave of County Monaghan in the Republic of Ireland which is accessible by road only via County Fermanagh in Northern Ireland.
