= Éamonn Ó Ciardha =

Irish historian and writer

Éamonn Ó Ciardha is an Irish historian and writer.

== Biography ==
Ó Ciardha is a native of Scotshouse, a village in the Barony of Dartree in the west of County Monaghan. He has an M.A. from the National University of Ireland (NUI) and a PhD from Cambridge University. His areas of interest are 17th- and 18th-century Irish history, focusing on Jacobitism, law, disorder and Irish language sources for the era.

Formerly a visiting professor at St Michael's College, University of Toronto, and at the Keough Institute of Irish Studies, University of Notre Dame, he is currently an Irish Research Council for the Humanities and Social Sciences fellow in the department of Modern History, Trinity College, Dublin (TCD).

== Bibliography ==
=== Articles ===
- Gaelic sources for the history of Ireland and Scotland in the early-modern period, in Bulletin of the Early Modern Ireland Committee, 1 (2). (1994), pp. 21–34.
- Tóraíochas is Rapairíochas in Éirinn sa seachtú haois déag/Tories and Rapparees in Ireland in the seventeenth century, History Ireland, 2 (1994), pp. 21–25.
- Buachaillí an tsléibhe agus bodaigh gan chéill: Toraíochas agus Rapairíochas i gCúige Uladh agus i dtuaisceart Chonnacht sa seachtú agas san ochtú haois déag, in Studia Hibernica, xxix (1995–7), pp. 59–85.
- Toryism in Cromwellian Ireland. Irish Sword, xix (1995). pp. 290–305.
- The Jacobite tradition 1719–1760, in Celtic History Review, II (1996), pp. 20–23.
- review of Fagan (ed.), Ireland in the Stuart papers, in History Ireland, iv, no. 2 (1996), pp. 53–55.
- review of Ó Saothraí, An Ministir Gaelach, in Irish Historical Studies, xxx (1997), pp. 481–3.
- Tory and Rapparee, in Welsch (ed.), Oxford companion to Irish literature (Oxford, 1996), pp. 490, 566.
- The Stuarts and deliverance in Irish and Scots-Gaelic poetry 1690–1760, in Connolly (ed.), Kingdoms united, pp. 78–94.
- The unkinde deserter and the bright duke: the dukes of Ormond in the Irish royalist tradition, in Barnard and Fenlon (ed.), The dukes of Ormond, pp. 177–93.
- A voice from the Jacobite underground: Liam Inglis, in Moran, (ed.), Radical Irish priests, pp. 16–39.
- The Irish Outlaw: the making of a nationalist icon, in J. Kelly, J. McCafferty and I. McGrath (eds), People and politics in Ireland: Essays on Irish History, 1660–1850, in honour of James I McGuire.
- 'Fighting Dick' Talbot, 'the Chevalier' Wogan and Thomas Arthur, comte de Lally: Jailbreakers and Jailbirds, History Ireland, 19, No. 2 (2011), pp. 19–22.

=== Books ===
- The Irish statute Staple books, 1596–1687, ed., with Jane Ohlmeyer, Four Courts Press, Dublin, 1999.
- Ireland and the Jacobite Cause, 1685–1766: A Fatal Attachment, Four Courts Press, Dublin, 2001, 2004.
