= R212 road (Ireland) =

Road in Ireland

R212 road
- Bóthar R212
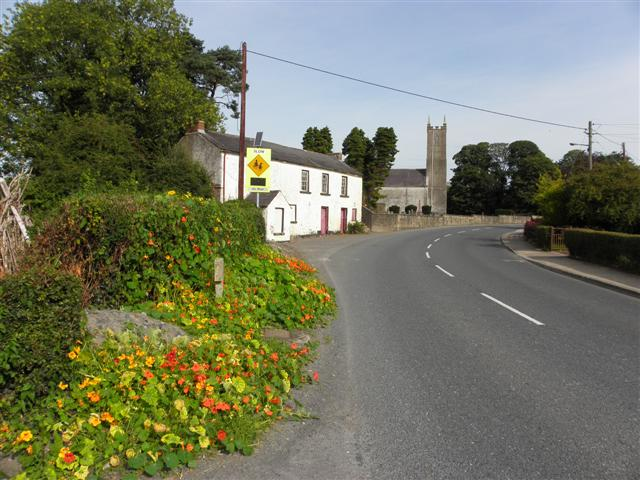
- R212 in Scotshouse

Route information
- Length: 28.3 km (17.6 mi)

Location
- Country: Ireland
- Primary destinations: County Cavan; leaves the N3 road at Pullamore; Cavan; Crosses the N3 road at Drumherrish; Regaskin; Ballyhaise; County Monaghan; Scotshouse; Terminates at the junction with the N54 road at Clones

Highway system
- Roads in Ireland; Motorways; Primary; Secondary; Regional

The R212 road is a regional road in Ireland which links Cavan in County Cavan with Clones in County Monaghan. The road passes through the villages of Pullamore, Drumherrish, Regaskin, Ballyhaise and Scotshouse. The road is 28.3 km (17.6 mi) long.

== See also ==
- Roads in Ireland
- National primary road
- National secondary road
