= Donnacha Ó Beacháin =

Irish political scientist, university professor and media commentator

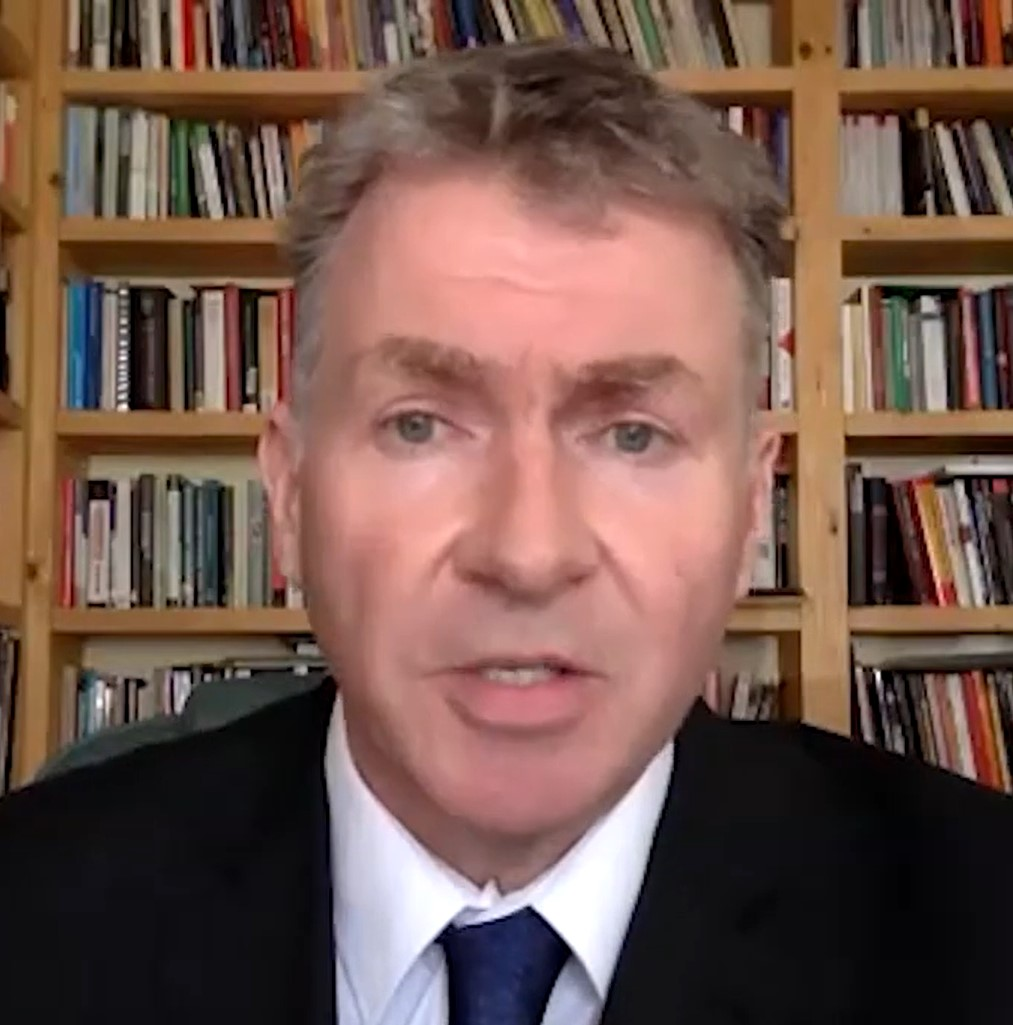
- Ó Beacháin in March 2022

Academic work
- Discipline: Political science
- Sub-discipline: Post-Soviet states; Unrecognized states; Politics of Ireland; Foreign policy

Donnacha Ó Beacháin is an Irish political scientist, university professor, and media commentator. He holds the position of Professor of Politics at Dublin City University, where he has been teaching since 2008, focusing on post-Soviet politics, unrecognised states, Irish politics, and foreign policy. His research spans all fifteen post-Soviet states and various protracted conflict zones, with ten years spent living and working in Central Asia, the South Caucasus, and Moldova. Ó Beacháin frequently contributes to both Irish and international media and actively participates in public debates, podcasts, and webinars.

== Awards and recognition ==
In recognition of his achievements, Ó Beacháin has twice been awarded the accolade "Champion of European Research" by Ireland's National Support Network in award ceremonies hosted by President Michael D. Higgins and Minister for Education and Skills. In May 2022, he was awarded the President's Research Award by DCU for outstanding contributions to the humanities and social sciences.

He has organised several major academic events in Ireland devoted to conflict in the post-Soviet space, particularly Ukraine, bringing together speakers from Ukraine, Russia, Georgia and the EU as well as the former President of Poland, Aleksander Kwaśniewski who had written the foreword to one of Ó Beacháin's books. On 18 November 2022, Ó Beacháin introduced the President of Ukraine, Volodymyr Zelenskyy, to Ireland's university students via videolink and hosted a questions and answers session between the president and students. The event was live-streamed to other third-level institutions across Ireland.

== Publications and events ==
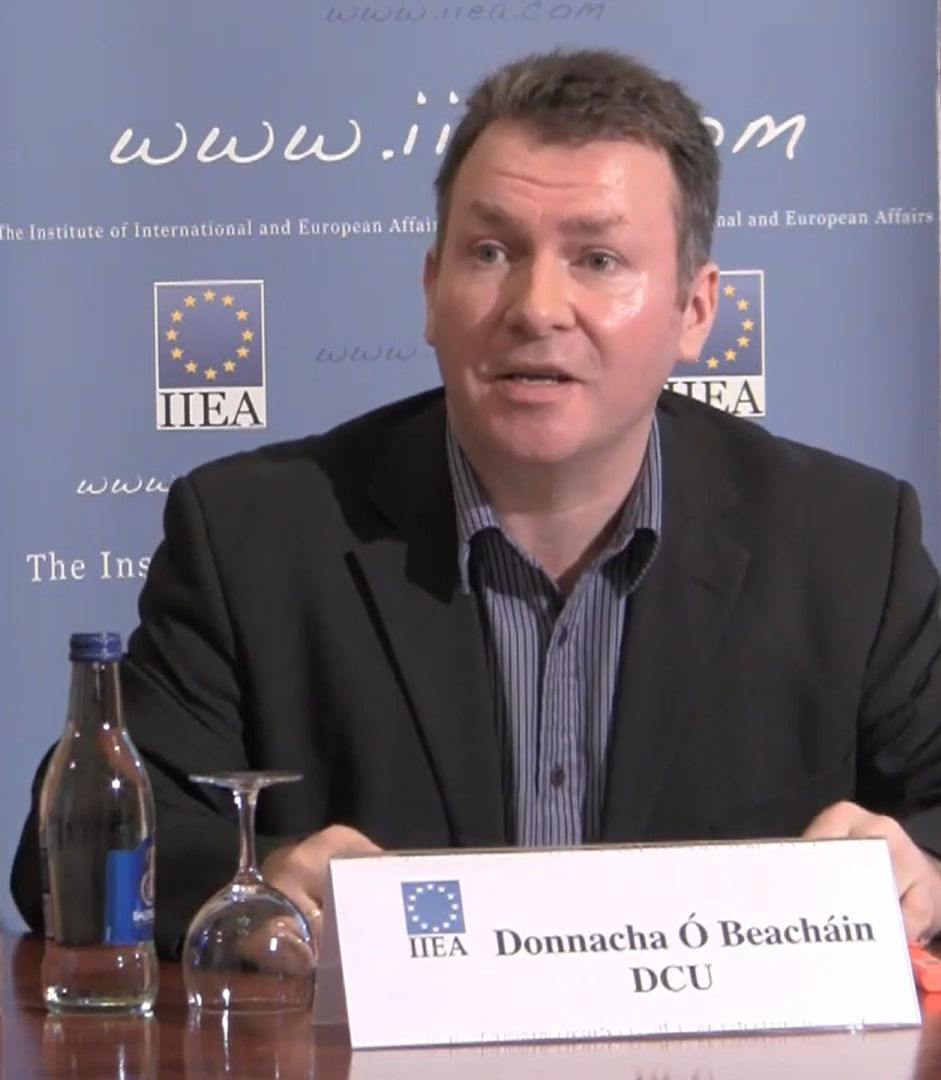
Ó Beacháin speaking at the Institute of International and European Affairs in 2013

Ó Beacháin is the author and editor of several books including From Partition to Brexit: The Irish Government and Northern Ireland, which was the 2019 recipient of the book of the year award from the Political Studies Association of Ireland. The book was described as 'brilliant, lucid and thought-provoking' by author and television presenter David McCullagh. Writing in History Ireland, the former Secretary-General of the Irish Department of Foreign Affairs Seán Donlon said that 'Ó Beacháin has broken new ground and provided a useful map for a generation of political scientists and historians'. In his review in the Irish Times Professor Diarmaid Ferriter, said the book exposed 'the true extent of the [Irish Government's] ambivalences and inconsistencies, using an impressive wealth of archival material in both Britain and Ireland unavailable to an earlier generation of researchers'. In the Irish Literary Supplement (Fall 2020) Professor Stephen Kelly described the book as "a masterly dissection", which "confirmed his place as one of Ireland's prominent scholars in the field of modern Irish history and politics".

In 2021 he produced From Whence I Came: The Kennedy Legacy, Ireland and America with Brian Murphy of the Technological University Dublin. Devoted to the life and legacy of former US President John F. Kennedy the book arises from the work of the Kennedy Summer School, which takes place annually in New Ross. Extracts from the book were published in the Irish Times, Irish Examiner, Irish News and Tuairisc.ie, and it received extensive coverage on radio and television. The book was launched by the Taoiseach Micheál Martin at an event organised by the Edward M. Kennedy Institute for the United States Senate which attracted more than 1000 attendees. The launch featured participation from Samantha Power, the former US Ambassador to the United Nations appointed by President Joe Biden to head USAID, Richard Neal, Chairman of the US House of Representatives Ways and Means Committee and Joe Kennedy III, former Massachusetts Congressman, currently serving as United States Special Envoy for Northern Ireland.

Ó Beacháin's 2025 book, Unfinished Empire: Russian Imperialism in Ukraine and the Near Abroad, connects historical Russian imperialism and Vladimir Putin's actions in Ukraine, framing the invasion as a modern continuation of a longstanding expansionist agenda.

== Selected books ==
- Donnacha Ó Beacháin, Unfinished Empire: Russian Imperialism in Ukraine and the Near Abroad. Agenda Publishing (2025).
- Donnacha Ó Beacháin and Brian Murphy (eds.): From Whence I Came: The Kennedy Legacy, Ireland and America, Merrion (2021).
- Donnacha Ó Beacháin, From Partition to Brexit: The Irish Government and Northern Ireland. Manchester University Press (2019).
- Donnacha Ó Beacháin and Mark O'Brien (eds.): Political Communication in the Republic of Ireland, Liverpool University Press (2014).
- Donnacha Ó Beacháin, Vera Sheridan and Sabina Stan (eds.): Life in Post-Communist Eastern Europe after EU Membership: Happy Ever After?, Routledge, (2012).
- Donnacha Ó Beacháin, Destiny of the Soldiers: Fianna Fáil, Irish Republicanism and the IRA, 1926-1973, Gill and Macmillan (2010).
- Donnacha Ó Beacháin and Abel Polese (eds.): The Colour Revolutions in the Former Soviet Republics: Successes and Failures, Routledge, (2010).
