= Ulster Canal =

Disused canal in Ireland

Coordinates: 54°08′N 7°22′W

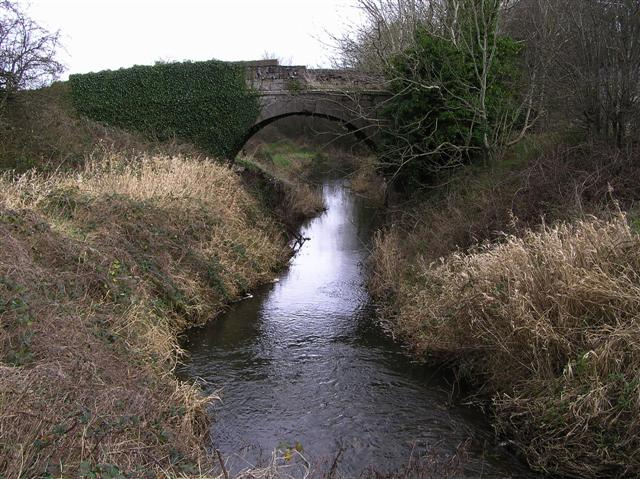
- The remains of the Ulster Canal at Tyholland
- Interactive map of Ulster Canal

Specifications
- Length: 74 km (46 miles)
- Locks: 26
- Status: largely abandoned

History
- Date completed: 1842
- Date closed: 1931

Geography
- Start point: Charlemont, Lough Neagh
- End point: Wattlebridge, Upper Lough Erne

The Ulster Canal is a canal running through part of County Armagh, County Tyrone and County Fermanagh in Northern Ireland and County Monaghan in the Republic of Ireland. The Ulster Canal was built between 1825 and 1842 and was 74 km (46 mi) long with 26 locks. It ran from Charlemont on the River Blackwater to near Wattlebridge on the Finn River, south-east of Upper Lough Erne. It was an ill-considered venture, with the locks built narrower than the other Irish waterways, preventing through trade, and an inadequate water supply. It was an abject failure commercially, and contributed to the collapse of the Lagan Navigation Company, who took it over from the government but were then refused permission to abandon it when they could not afford the maintenance costs. It finally closed in 1931. Waterways Ireland started work on rebuilding the canal at its southern end in 2015.

== History ==
In 1778, a proposal was made for a canal from Ballyshannon to the Lower Lough Erne. The estimated cost of the scheme was £32,000, but it was already seen as part of a larger project, since a further £8,000 would have provided a link to Enniskillen, Belturbet and Ballyconnell. A future link from Ballyconnell to Ballymore, along the Woodford River valley, and on to Lough Scurr and the River Shannon at Leitrim was suggested but not costed. It would thus be an important section of a trans-Irish waterway, linking Belfast in the east to Limerick in the west, which would compete with a similar link formed by the Grand Canal and the Royal Canal further to the south. Government funding was forthcoming in 1783, and a section of the canal was constructed between Ballyshannon and Belleek, with Richard Evans, the engineer for the Royal Canal, overseeing the work, which included a lock at Belleek. The project stalled in 1794, when funds ran out.

The Directors General of Inland Navigation asked Evans to prepare an estimate of the costs to finish the work in 1801, but no action was taken. By 1814, the Directors General were faced with problems of unemployment in the area, and a canal from Lough Neagh to Lough Erne was seen as a way to provide jobs for the local population. John Killaly was commissioned to survey the route of such a link, and produced his report in February 1815. His estimate of £233,000 would provide a canal which ascended through six locks from Wattlebridge to a summit near Monaghan and then descended through another sixteen to reach Lough Neagh. It would be 35.5 miles (57.1 km) long, and would include a branch to Armagh. The plan was ill-thought-out, as he decided to make the locks of a similar size to those on the Royal Canal, 76 by 14 feet (23.2 by 4.3 m), which would accommodate boats up to about 13.3 feet (4.1 m) wide, but those that already used Lough Neagh, and the Lagan Canal, the Newry Canal and the Coalisland Canal, were 14.8 feet (4.5 m) wide, and would not therefore be able to use the route.

Ulster Canal Act 1825
- Act of Parliament
- Parliament of the United Kingdom
- Long title: An Act for making and maintaining a navigable Canal from Lough Erne, in the County of Fermanagh, to the River Blackwater, near the Village of Charlemont, in the County of Armagh.
- Citation: 6 Geo. 4. c. cxciii
- Territorial extent: United Kingdom

Dates
- Royal assent: 5 July 1825
- Commencement: 5 July 1825 (Note: The Acts of Parliament (Commencement) Act 1793.)
Other legislation
Amended by	Ulster Canal Act 1828; Ulster Canal 1836

Status: Amended

Text of statute as originally enacted

A public meeting was held at Monaghan in February 1817, and despite strong local support, including an offer to provide two-thirds of the cost by a group of landowners and businessmen, the Directors General did not take any action, and the project remained an idea. The proprietors who had taken over the Lagan Canal in 1810 saw the link as a way to increase traffic on their own canal, and public support for it grew steadily, until a large group of people requested parliamentary approval for a revised scheme, which was very similar to Killaly's of a decade previously. The government remained unconvinced that they would receive a return on any money advanced, and so the Directors General could not act. Finally, in 1825, a private company was authorised to construct the canal by the passing of the Ulster Canal Act 1825 (6 Geo. 4. c. cxciii). It was estimated to cost £160,050, as a new survey had produced a plan which only needed eighteen locks.

Ulster Canal Act 1828
- Act of Parliament
- Parliament of the United Kingdom
- Long title: An Act to amend an Act for making and maintaining a Navigable Canal from Lough Erne, in the County of Fermanagh, to the River Blackwater near the Village of Charlemont in the County of Armagh.
- Citation: 9 Geo. 4. c. xcvi
- Territorial extent: United Kingdom

Dates
- Royal assent: 19 June 1828
- Commencement: 19 June 1828
Other legislation
Amends	Ulster Canal Act 1825
Amended by	Ulster Canal 1836

Status: Amended

Text of statute as originally enacted

Ulster Canal Act 1829
- Act of Parliament
- Parliament of the United Kingdom
- Long title: An Act to explain the Acts for making the Ulster Canal in the Counties of Fermanagh and Armagh.
- Citation: 10 Geo. 4. c. cix
- Territorial extent: United Kingdom

Dates
- Royal assent: 1 June 1829
- Commencement: 1 June 1829

Status: Current legislation

Text of statute as originally enacted

Ulster Canal Act 1831
- Act of Parliament
- Parliament of the United Kingdom
- Long title: An Act to amend the several Acts for making and maintaining the Ulster Canal in the Counties of Fermanagh and Armagh.
- Citation: 1 & 2 Will. 4. c. lvi
- Territorial extent: United Kingdom

Dates
- Royal assent: 23 August 1831
- Commencement: 23 August 1831
Other legislation
Amended by	Ulster Canal Act 1836

Status: Amended

Text of statute as originally enacted

The company then applied to the borrow £100,000 from the Exchequer Bill Loan Commission, a body created under the Public Works Loans Act 1817 (57 Geo. 3. c. 34). The engineer Thomas Telford was sent to Ireland to inspect the plans and estimates, which he duly approved, but the interest rates on the loan could not be agreed, and three further acts of Parliament, the Ulster Canal Act 1828 (9 Geo. 4. c. xcvi), the Ulster Canal Act 1829 (10 Geo. 4. c. cix), and the Ulster Canal Act 1831 (1 & 2 Will. 4. c. lvi), were obtained before a loan of £120,000 was agreed. Problems were then experienced with the contractors, Henry, Mullins and MacMahon from Dublin, who were awarded the construction contract in 1832. Telford then decided that there were serious problems with the design and that a new survey should be made. This increased the number of locks to 26, and the contractors were asked for a new estimate. Agreement could not be reached, and they eventually withdrew from the project. John Killaly, the local engineer, died in 1832, and it is not known whether he decided to reduce the width of the locks before he died, or whether the decision was made by Telford, but they were built 12 feet (3.7 m) wide, preventing through traffic except in specially built boats. William Cubitt succeeded Telford after he died in 1834. The canal was eventually finished in 1841. From the summit pound, nineteen locks descended to Lough Neagh, and in the other direction, seven descended to Lough Erne. Water was supplied by Quig Lough reservoir, a lake near Monaghan which had been enlarged. The final lock at Wattlebridge was only 11.7 feet (3.6 m) wide, making it the narrowest in Ireland. The project had cost over £230,000.

=== Operation ===
The canal failed to generate significant trade, as the water supply was inadequate, and goods had to be transhipped at either end into narrower boats. In addition, there was no link to the River Shannon to generate through traffic, and unlikely to be one while the canal did not prosper. The company were unable to repay any of the loan made by the Exchequer Bill Loan Commissioners, and in 1851, the Office of Public Works (also known as the Board of Works) took control of it. After cosmetic repairs, it was leased to William Dargan, who had built most of it as contractor, and ran the only significant carrying operation on the waterway. The Ulster Railway reached Monaghan in 1858, and three years later the canal was in a ruinous state. Sir John Macneill, the Irish railway engineer, suggested that the best use of it was to drain the water and let cows graze on it.

Ulster Canal Act 1865
- Act of Parliament
- Parliament of the United Kingdom
- Long title: An Act for transferring the Ulster Canal to the Commissioners of Public Works in Ireland.
- Citation: 28 & 29 Vict. c. 109
- Territorial extent: United Kingdom

Dates
- Royal assent: 5 July 1865
- Commencement: 5 July 1865

Status: Current legislation

Text of statute as originally enacted

Ulster Canal and Tyrone Navigation Act 1888 (Note: Section 1.)
- Act of Parliament
- Parliament of the United Kingdom
- Long title: An Act for the acquisition by the Lagan Navigation Company of the Ulster Canal and the Tyrone Navigation or Coal Island Canal from the Commissioners of Public Works in Ireland and for other purposes.
- Citation: 51 & 52 Vict. c. cxxxvii
- Territorial extent: United Kingdom

Dates
- Royal assent: 24 July 1888
- Commencement: 24 July 1888

Status: Current legislation

Text of statute as originally enacted

In an attempt to recoup their losses, the government took control of it again by the Ulster Canal Act 1865 (28 & 29 Vict. c. 109). They closed it, and spent £22,000 over eight years on repairs. Their main priority was to secure an adequate water supply, but when the canal reopened in 1873, this proved not to have been achieved. Maintenance costs far exceeded revenue, and what little traffic there was, was confined to the Lough Erne end of the canal, as the summit was mostly unnavigable, and there was only sufficient water during eight months of every year. However, there was a slight improvement in traffic in 1880, when W. R. Rea, the secretary of the Lagan Navigation Company, set up a new carrying company using smaller boats. There was a vague promise of government aid for any company interested in taking it over. A series of negotiations then took place, but the government failed on three occasions to pass a bill to authorise the sellout to the Lagan Canal. They eventually suggested that the Lagan Canal should try to obtain a private bill to achieve the aim, and they were successful in doing so with the Ulster Canal and Tyrone Navigation Act 1888 (51 & 52 Vict. c. cxxxvii).

=== Decline ===
The House of Lords had succeeded in removing a clause from the bill which allowed the Lagan Navigation Company to close the Ulster Canal after ten years, and they were saddled with a liability in perpetuity. Vast sums were spent on maintenance, compared to income, and although some trade developed, profits from the Lagan Canal and the Coalisland Canal, which they also owned, were swallowed up in trying to keep the Ulster Canal open. The company never really recovered from the acquisition. The last boat to enter the canal did so in 1929, and a "warrant of abandonment" was finally obtained on 9 January 1931. This allowed them to abandon the section of the canal in Northern Ireland. An "order of release", obtained on 15 April, removed all liability for maintenance.

A similar order in the newly established Republic of Ireland was refused. In the 1940s Monaghan County Council was granted a judgment mortgage on the canal in lieu of unpaid rates. The Lagan Navigation Company offered to give the canal to the council in lieu of monies owed, but the council declined, having been advised that the upkeep of bridges etc. would be beyond their ability to finance. The Lagan Navigation Company was dissolved under the Inland Navigation Act (Northern Ireland) 1954 (c. 1 (N.I.)). This left the stretch through Monaghan as 'ownerless goods' (bona vacantia) and as such fell to the Minister for Finance. Ownership in the Republic passed back to the Office of Public Works under the State Property Act 1954. In the early 1970s, Monaghan County Council, Monaghan Urban District Council and Clones Urban District Council each acquired some sections of the canal under the Derelict Sites Act 1961. Stretches in County Monaghan which were not derelict at that time (i.e., which were being occupied) could not be acquired and ownership remains with the Office of Public Works.

== Route ==
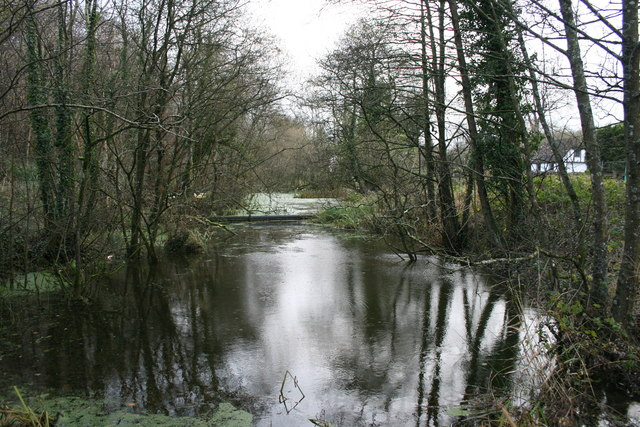
The canal at Clones Road, Monaghan.

The canal follows a fairly straight south-west to north-east course, from the island and townland of Derrykerrib, at the mouth of the Finn River, very near Wattlebridge in the south-east of County Fermanagh, to Charlemont in the north-west of County Armagh, where it joins the River Blackwater. There were two locks close to the Finn River, two beyond Clones, and three near Smithborough, where the summit was reached. The summit pound was less than 6 miles (10 km) long, and was fed from Quig Lough reservoir, just to the north of the end of the summit. Two locks drop the level before Monaghan is reached and there is a flight of seven shortly after the town. The border with County Armagh in Northern Ireland crosses the canal below them. There are two isolated locks near Middletown, and the a level section before the canal reaches a gorge to the west of Benburb. Fitting the canal through here presented a lot of problems for the builders, as another six locks were required in awkward terrain. There is another lock above Blackwatertown, and the final lock below Charlemont, before the canal joins the River Blackwater.

The summit level was 213 feet (65 m) above sea level. The original locks were built for boats which were 62 by 11 feet (18.9 by 3.4 m). Of the large number of bridges that crossed the canal, 56 remained in 2002.

== Restoration ==
A feasibility study into the possible reopening of the waterway was carried out in 1998 (and revised in 2000). The report found that there were no insurmountable engineering problems to such a plan but issues such as lock capacity/size and the adequacy of the water supply would need to be addressed. All historic locks would need to be significantly widened to at least 5 metres (16 ft) to accommodate modern waterway craft. A restored canal would create significant long-term financial benefits to the local economy; however, the report concluded that unless the reasons that caused it to be an abject failure in the first place were addressed, there seemed little point in restoring the canal.

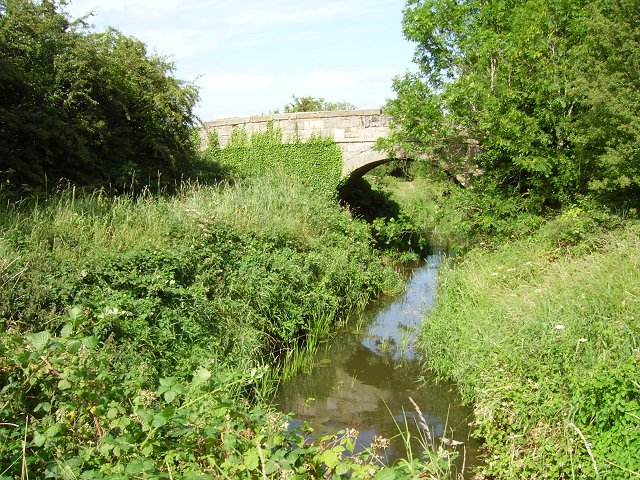
Ulster Canal at Tyholland.

In 2004 Waterways Ireland announced that a reopened canal would bring enormous benefits to the areas it passed through, because it would reconnect with the already restored Shannon–Erne Waterway (opened 23 May 1994). Rather than being a true restoration, it involved the construction of a state-of-the-art waterway along a historic route, and a similar approach would be required on the Ulster Canal.

At the North/South Ministerial Council meeting on 17 July 2007, it was announced that the governments would work towards the restoration of the stretch of the canal linking the town of Clones, in County Monaghan, to Upper Lough Erne. The cost of the development would be €35 million, paid for by the Irish Exchequer. In August 2010, Waterways Ireland published an Ulster Canal Restoration Plan, an Environmental Report and an Appropriate Assessment. In September 2010 it held two Public Information Days, one in Clones, County Monaghan, and one in Newtownbutler, County Fermanagh, and invited written comments on its plans by 30 September 2010. Reports on the proposed restoration were available in both Northern Ireland and the Republic.

Despite a few objections, Minister Heather Humphreys announced in February 2015 that the Irish government had given its approval to Waterways Ireland for the restoration of the canal between Castle Saunderson and Erne basin. The funding would come from Waterways Ireland. On 24 April 2015 the project was formally launched, when a meeting was held at Derrykerrib Bridge, attended by Heather Humphreys and representatives of Waterways Ireland. The first phase involved extending the Erne Navigation from Quivvy Lough to Castle Saunderson, near Belturbet. Of the 5 kilometres (3.1 mi) forming this phase, some 3 kilometres (1.9 mi) was a new cut, following a somewhat different route to the original canal, and a new Derrykerrib Bridge was built, to increase the size of boats that can pass through it. Dredging of a section of the Finn River was expected to take place in Autumn 2015, but this was delayed, with "contractual issues" being cited as the cause. Waterways Ireland's budget for 2016 included €2.7 million earmarked for the Ulster Canal project. There were further delays caused by poor ground conditions, flooding, and the need to maintain access for residents while the work was ongoing. The new bridge and its associated channel were expected to be completed by April 2018. The first phase of the Ulster Canal restoration was nearing completion in September 2019.

With phase 1 completed and open to the public, funding for phase 2 of the project was announced. The Taoiseach's Shared Island fund promised €6 million in December 2020, and a further €5.57 million was provided by the Department of Rural and Community Development on 28 April 2021. This will fund a relatively short section, detached from the Phase 1 section, between Clones and Clonfad in County Monaghan. The work includes around 1 kilometre (0.6 mi) of canal and towpath, a 40-berth marina, two new bridges and restoration of a third bridge, together with the provision of an amenity area with car parks. Crucially, it will include the provision of a sustainable water supply. The main project is expected to be completed in mid-2023, with some of the amenities taking a little longer. Phase 3 of the project, which will increase the length of restored canal to 13.5 kilometres (8.4 mi), will link the first two phases together, and involves several crossings of the border.

== See also ==
- Canals of the United Kingdom
- Canals of Ireland

== Bibliography ==
- Cumberlidge, Jane (2002). The Inland Waterways of Ireland. Imray Laurie Norie and Wilson. ISBN 978-0-85288-424-9.
- Delany, Ruth (2004). Ireland's Inland Waterways. Appletree Press. ISBN 978-0-86281-824-1.
- Hall, Thomas (3 April 2017). "Restoration of Ulster Canal Proves A Technical Challenge". Afloat. Archived from the original on 19 October 2019.
- McCutcheon, W A (1965). The Canals of the North of Ireland. David and Charles. ISBN 978-0-7153-4028-8.
- O'Brien, Tim (26 April 2016). "Work delayed on first stage of reopened Ulster Canal". Irish Times. Archived from the original on 15 August 2020.
