= Albert Finney =

English actor (1936–2019)

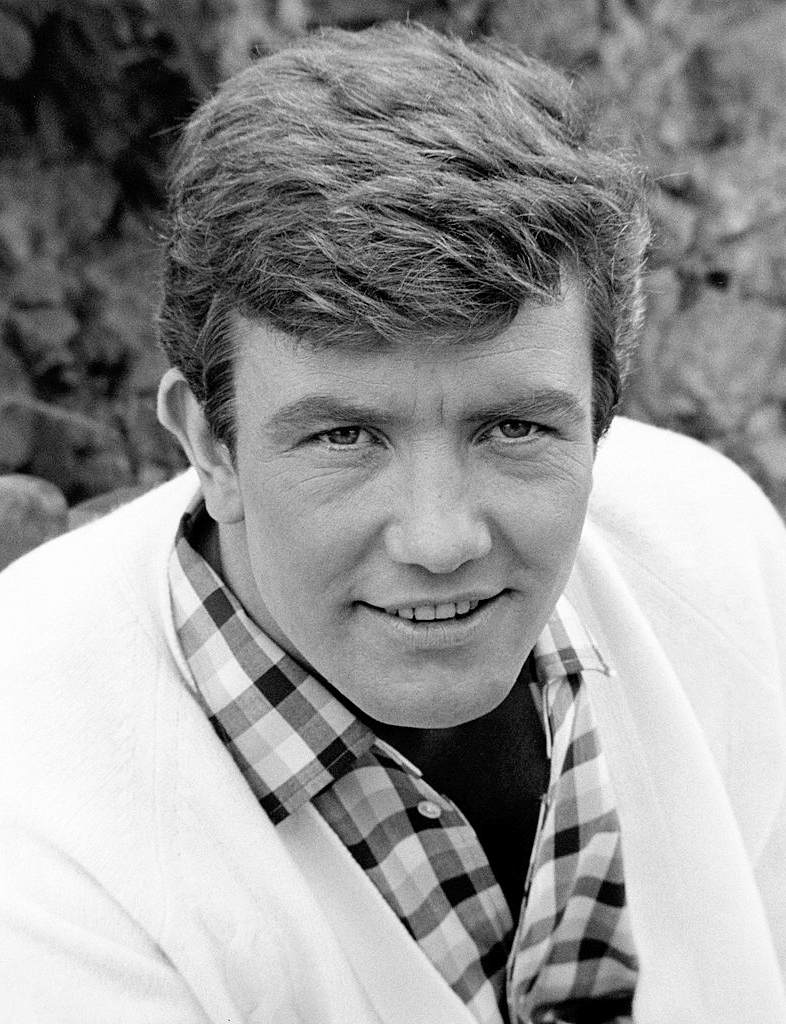
- Finney in 1966
- Born: 9 May 1936; Salford, Lancashire, England
- Died: 7 February 2019 (aged 82); Chelsea, London, England
- Education: Royal Academy of Dramatic Art
- Occupation: Actor
- Years active: 1956–2012
- Spouses: Jane Wenham (m. 1957; div. 1961); Anouk Aimée (m. 1970; div. 1978); Penelope Delmage (m. 2006)
- Children: 1

Albert Finney (9 May 1936 – 7 February 2019) was an English actor. He attended the Royal Academy of Dramatic Art and worked in the theatre before attaining fame for film acting during the early 1960s, debuting with The Entertainer (1960), directed by Tony Richardson, who had previously directed him in theatre. He maintained a successful career on stage and screen.

He is known for his roles in Saturday Night and Sunday Morning (1960), Tom Jones (1963), Two for the Road (1967), Scrooge (1970), Murder on the Orient Express (1974), Annie (1982), The Dresser (1983), Miller's Crossing (1990), A Man of No Importance (1994), Erin Brockovich (2000), Big Fish (2003), A Good Year (2006), The Bourne Ultimatum (2007), Before the Devil Knows You're Dead (2007), and the James Bond film Skyfall (2012), and for his performances on stage and television.

A recipient of Actor Award, BAFTA, Golden Globe, Emmy, Silver Bear and Volpi Cup awards, Finney was nominated for an Academy Award five times, as Best Actor four times, for Tom Jones (1963), Murder on the Orient Express (1974), The Dresser (1983), and Under the Volcano (1984), and as Best Supporting Actor for Erin Brockovich (2000). He received several awards for his performance as Winston Churchill in the 2002 BBC–HBO television biographical movie The Gathering Storm.

== Life and career ==
=== Early years and education ===
Finney was born on 9 May 1936 in Salford, Lancashire, the youngest of three children and only son of Albert Finney, a bookmaker, and Alice (née Hobson). He was educated at Tootal Drive Primary School, Salford Grammar School, and the Royal Academy of Dramatic Art (RADA), from which he graduated in 1956.

=== 1956–1962: Early career ===
While at RADA, Finney made an early television appearance playing Mr Hardcastle in Oliver Goldsmith's She Stoops to Conquer. The BBC filmed and broadcast the RADA students' performances at the Vanbrugh Theatre in London on Friday 6 January 1956. Other members of the cast included Roy Kinnear and Richard Briers. Finney graduated from RADA and became a member of the Royal Shakespeare Company. He was offered a contract by the Rank Organisation, but refused it to perform for the Birmingham Rep. He was in a production of The Miser for Birmingham Rep, which was filmed for the BBC in 1956. Also for the BBC he appeared in The Claverdon Road Job (1957) and View Friendship and Marriage (1958).

At Birmingham he played the title role of Henry V, and in 1958, made his London stage debut in Jane Arden's The Party, directed by Charles Laughton, who featured in the production along with his wife, Elsa Lanchester. In 1959, Finney appeared at Stratford in the title role of Coriolanus, replacing an ill Laurence Olivier. Finney guest featured for several episodes of Emergency-Ward 10 and was Lysander in a TV version of A Midsummer Night's Dream (1959) directed by Peter Hall.

Finney's first film appearance was in Tony Richardson's The Entertainer (1960), with Laurence Olivier. Finney and Alan Bates played Olivier's sons. He made his film breakthrough in the same year with his portrayal of a disillusioned factory worker in Karel Reisz's film version of Alan Sillitoe's Saturday Night and Sunday Morning (1960), produced by Richardson. The film was a success, being the third most popular movie in Britain that year. It earned more than half a million pounds. Finney then did Billy Liar (1960) on stage and for British television. Finney had been chosen to play T. E. Lawrence in David Lean's production of Lawrence of Arabia after a successful and elaborate screen-test that took four days to shoot. However, Finney baulked at signing a multi-year contract for producer Sam Spiegel and chose to decline the role.

Finney created the title role in Luther, the 1961 play by John Osborne depicting the life of Martin Luther. He performed the role with the English Stage Company in London, Nottingham, Paris and New York. The original West End run at the Phoenix ended in March 1962, after 239 performances there, when Finney had to quit the cast to fulfil a contractual obligation with a film company.

=== 1963–1977 ===
Finney starred in the Academy Award–winning 1963 film Tom Jones, directed by Richardson and written by Osborne. Due to the success of Tom Jones, British exhibitors voted Finney the ninth most popular film actor in 1963. Finney received 10% of the film's earnings, which made him over $1 million.

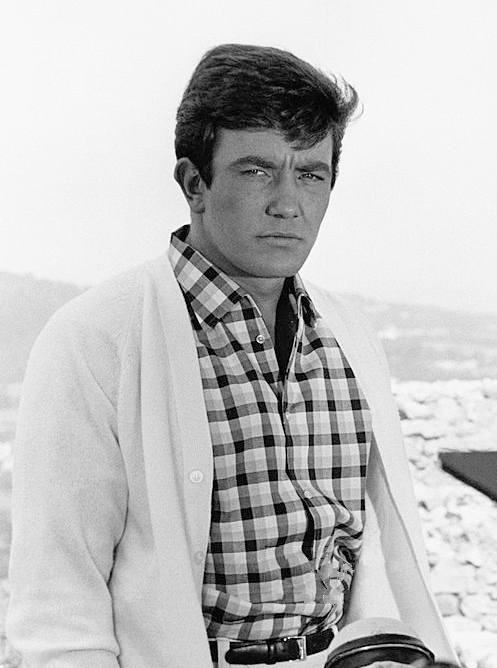
Finney in 1966.

Finney followed this with a small part in ensemble war film The Victors (1963), which was a box-office failure. He then made his Broadway debut in Luther in 1963. When that run ended he decided to take a year off and sail around the world. "People told me to cash in on my success while I was hot," he later said. "I'd been acting for about eight years and had only had one vacation ... Captain Cook had been a hero of mine when I was a kid, and I thought it would be exciting to go to some of the places in the Pacific where he'd been." The success of Tom Jones enabled Finney to produce his next film, Night Must Fall, in 1964, which he also featured in and which was directed by Reisz. A remake of the classic 1937 film of the same title, the film was a failure and Finney's performance received poor reviews.

Finney undertook a season of plays at the Royal National Theatre, including Miss Julie by August Strindberg in 1965. He continued acting in films with Two for the Road (1967) co-featuring Audrey Hepburn. He and Michael Medwin formed a production company, Memorial Productions, which made Privilege (1967), directed by Peter Watkins; The Burning (1968), a short directed by Stephen Frears; and If.... (1968), directed by Lindsay Anderson. Memorial also did stage productions, such as A Day in the Death of Joe Egg, which Finney performed in London and then Broadway. Memorial also produced some in which Finney did not appear, such as Spring and Port Wine and The Burgular. Memorial then made Charlie Bubbles (1968), which Finney featured in and also directed. Liza Minnelli made her feature debut in the movie. Finney later called it "the most intense sense of creation I've ever had." Finney featured in The Picasso Summer in 1969, and played the title role in the musical Scrooge in 1970.

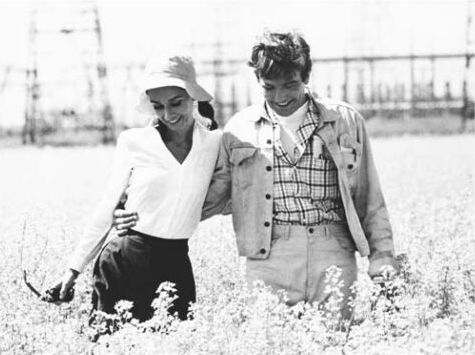
Audrey Hepburn and Finney in Two for the Road (1967).

Finney then made Gumshoe (1971), the first feature film directed by Stephen Frears, for Memorial. Memorial continued to produce films in which Finney did not appear: Spring and Port Wine (1970), with James Mason; Loving Memory (1971), an early directorial effort from Tony Scott; Bleak Moments (1971), the first feature from Mike Leigh; O Lucky Man! (1973) for Anderson; and Law and Disorder (1974); filmed in Hollywood. In 1972, Finney returned to stage after a six-year absence with Alpha Beta, which he later filmed on television with Rachel Roberts. Memorial Productions stopped producing and Finney emphasized acting. "It was OK at first," he later said, "but in the end it was sitting in an office, pitching ideas to Hollywood and waiting for the phone to ring."

Finney played Agatha Christie's Belgian master detective Hercule Poirot in the film Murder on the Orient Express (1974). Finney became so well known for the role that he complained that it typecast him for a number of years, "People really do think I am 300 pounds with a French accent", he said. He received nominations for the Academy Award for Best Actor and the BAFTA Award for Best Actor in a Leading Role.

He announced he intended to direct the film, The Girl in Melanie Klein, for Memorial, but it was not made.

Finney decided to take time off from features and focus on stage acting, doing classics at the National Theatre in London. "I felt that it needed commitment," he later said. "When you're making movies all the time, you stop breathing. You literally don't breathe in the same way that you do when you're playing the classics. When you have to deliver those long, complex speeches on stage, you can't heave your shoulders after every sentence. The set of muscles required for that kind of acting need to be trained. I really wanted to try and do justice to my own potential in the parts. I didn't want to be a movie actor just dropping in, doing Hamlet and taking off again. I wanted to feel part of the company."

Finney was at the National for over three years during which he played in Hamlet, Macbeth, Tamburlaine, and plays by Anton Chekhov. Finney made a TV film Forget-Me-Not-Lane in 1975, which was written by Peter Nichols, and he also performed a brief role in The Duellists (1977), the first feature directed by Ridley Scott. He also released an album through Motown.

=== 1981–1999 ===
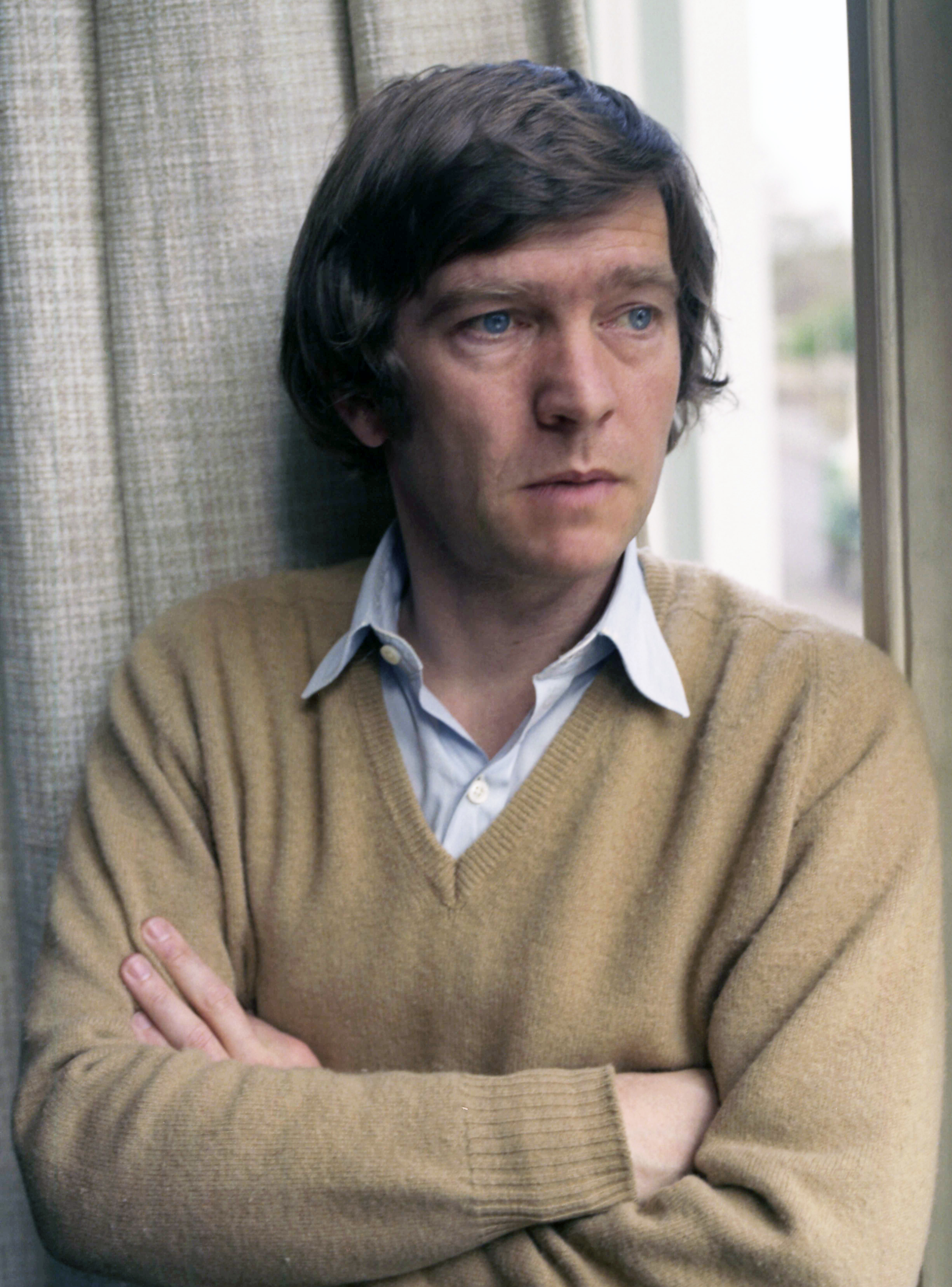
Tom Courtenay, with whom Finney starred in The Dresser (1983).

Finney had not played a major role in a feature film in six years, and started to think about resuming work with cinema. The last two successful films he had made were Scrooge and Orient Express in which he was heavily disguised. "Most Americans probably think I weigh 300 pounds, have black hair and talk with a French accent like Hercule Poirot," said Finney. "So I thought they should have a look at me while I was still almost a juvenile and kind of cute." Finney decided to make six movies in succession "so that I could relax and get back into it again. In order to feel really assured and comfortable in front of a camera, you've got to do it for a while." The first three were thrillers: Loophole (1981), with Susannah York; Wolfen (1981), directed by Michael Wadleigh; and Looker (1981), written and directed by Michael Crichton. He received excellent reviews for his performance in the drama Shoot the Moon (1982). Finney said the role "required personal acting; I had to dig into myself. When you have to expose yourself and use your own vulnerability, you can get a little near the edge."

Less well received was his performance as Daddy Warbucks in the Hollywood film version of Annie (1982), which was directed by John Huston. Finney said doing this movie after Shoot The Moon was "marvelous. I use a completely different side of myself as Warbucks. Annie is show biz; it's open, simple and direct. It needs bold, primary colors. I don't have to reveal the inner workings of the character, and that's a relief."

Finney featured in Peter Yates-directed movie The Dresser (1983) as Sir, a veteran actor struggling through a difficult performance of King Lear. He earned nominations for the Academy Award for Best Actor, the BAFTA Award for Best Actor in a Leading Role, and the Golden Globe Award for Best Actor – Motion Picture Drama. He then played the title role for the TV film Pope John Paul II (1984), his American television debut. Huston cast Finney in the lead role of Under the Volcano (1984), which earned both men great acclaim, including another Best Actor Oscar nomination for Finney. Finney played the lead role of Sydney Kentridge in The Biko Inquest, a 1984 dramatization of the inquest into the death of Steve Biko which was filmed for television after a London run.

Finney performed on stage in Orphans in 1986, and the film version, directed by Alan J. Pakula. He had the lead in a television miniseries, The Endless Game (1989), written and directed by Bryan Forbes. Finney began the 1990s with the lead role in a film for HBO, The Image (1990). He received great acclaim playing the gangster boss in Miller's Crossing (1990), replacing Trey Wilson shortly before filming. Finney made an appearance at Roger Waters' The Wall – Live in Berlin (1990), where he played "The Judge" during the performance of "The Trial".

Finney featured in the BBC TV serial The Green Man, based on the Kingsley Amis novel. He followed it with The Playboys (1992) for Gillies MacKinnon; Rich in Love (1993) for Bruce Beresford; The Browning Version (1994) for Mike Figgis; A Man of No Importance (1994), for Suri Krishnamma; and The Run of the Country (1995) for Peter Yates. In 1994, Finney played a gay bus conductor in early 1960s Dublin in A Man of No Importance. He had the main role in Dennis Potter's final two plays, Karaoke and Cold Lazarus (both 1996). In the latter he played a frozen, disembodied head. Finney did Nostromo (1997) for television, and Washington Square (1997) for Agnieszka Holland then made A Rather English Marriage (1998) with Tom Courtenay. He had supporting roles in Breakfast of Champions (1999) and Simpatico (1999).

=== 2000–2019 ===
Finney had his biggest success in several years with Erin Brockovich (2000), alongside Julia Roberts for Steven Soderbergh. His portrayal of real-life California lawyer Edward L. Masry earned him a nomination for the Academy Award for Best Supporting Actor, his fifth and final Oscar nomination. Finney had a cameo in Soderbergh's Traffic (2000) and played Ernest Hemingway in Hemingway, the Hunter of Death (2001) for TV. He had the main role in Delivering Milo (2001) and in 2002 his critically acclaimed portrayal of Winston Churchill in The Gathering Storm won him British Academy of Film and Television Arts (BAFTA), Emmy and Golden Globe awards as Best Actor.

He also played the title role of the television series My Uncle Silas, based on the short stories by H. E. Bates, about a roguish but lovable poacher-cum-farm labourer looking after his great-nephew. The show played for two series broadcast in 2001 and 2003. Finney had a major role in Big Fish (2003) directed by Tim Burton, and did another cameo for Soderbergh in Ocean's Twelve (2004). He sang in Tim Burton's Corpse Bride (2005) and the film of Aspects of Love (2005).

Finney was reunited with Ridley Scott in A Good Year (2006). He had support roles in Amazing Grace (2006), The Bourne Ultimatum (2007), and Before the Devil Knows You're Dead (2007), which reunited him with Murder on the Orient Express director Sidney Lumet. His final film role was in Skyfall (2012). A lifelong supporter of Manchester United Football Club, Finney narrated the documentary Munich, about the air crash that killed most of the Busby Babes in 1958, which was shown on United's TV channel MUTV in February 2008.

=== Theatre ===
He received Tony Award nominations for Luther (1964) and A Day in the Death of Joe Egg (1968), and also starred on stage in Love for Love, Strindberg's Miss Julie, Black Comedy, The Country Wife, Alpha Beta, Beckett's Krapp's Last Tape, Tamburlaine the Great, Another Time and, his last stage appearance, in 1997, "Art" by Yasmina Reza, which preceded the 1998 Tony Award-winning Broadway run.

He won an Olivier Award for Orphans in 1986 and won three Evening Standard Theatre Awards for Best Actor.

Finney never abandoned stage work and continued his association with the National Theatre Company in London, where he had performed during the mid-1960s in Shakespeare's Much Ado About Nothing at the Old Vic and Chekhov's The Cherry Orchard during the 1970s at the National Theatre.

== Personal life and death ==
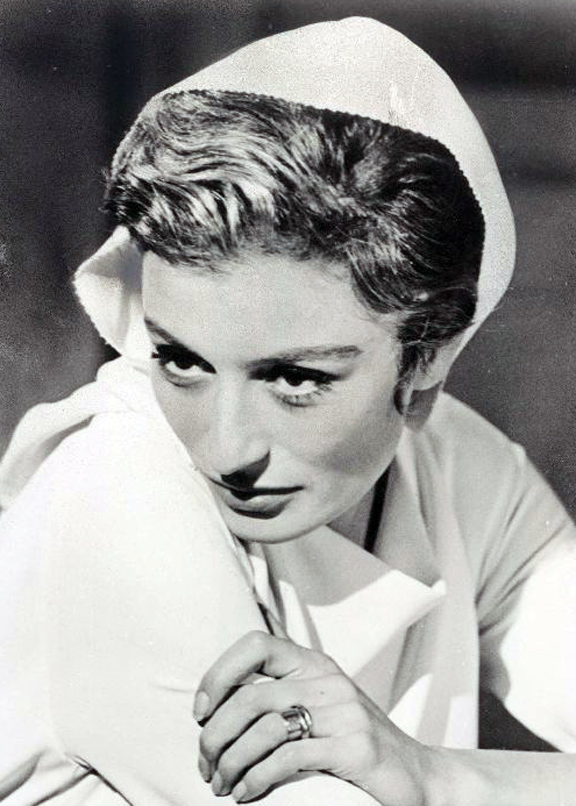
Finney's second wife Anouk Aimée.

In 1957, Finney married actress Jane Wenham; they had a son, Simon Finney, who works in the movie industry as a camera operator. They divorced in 1961. In 1970, Finney married French actress Anouk Aimée, a union that lasted eight years. In 2006, he married Penelope Delmage, a travel agent. They remained together until Finney's death.

In May 2011, Finney disclosed that he had been receiving treatment for kidney cancer. According to a 2012 interview, he had been diagnosed with the disease five years earlier and had surgery, followed by six rounds of chemotherapy.

Finney died of a chest infection at the Royal Marsden Hospital on 7 February 2019; he was 82.

== Acting credits ==
=== Film ===
Film performances
Year	Title	Role	Notes	Refs.
1960	The Entertainer	Mick Rice		
1960	Saturday Night and Sunday Morning	Arthur Seaton		
1963	Tom Jones	Tom Jones		
1963	The Victors	Russian Soldier		
1964	Night Must Fall	Danny		
1967	Two for the Road	Mark Wallace		
1968	Charlie Bubbles	Charlie Bubbles	Also director	
1969	The Picasso Summer	George Smith		
1970	Scrooge	Ebenezer Scrooge		
1971	Gumshoe	Eddie Ginley		
1973	Alpha Beta	Frank Elliot		
1974	Murder on the Orient Express	Hercule Poirot		
1975	The Adventure of Sherlock Holmes' Smarter Brother	Man in opera audience	Cameo; uncredited	
1977	The Duellists	Fouche		
1981	Loophole	Mike Daniels		
1981	Wolfen	Detective Dewey Wilson		
1981	Looker	Dr. Larry Roberts		
1982	Shoot the Moon	George Dunlap		
1982	Annie	Oliver 'Daddy' Warbucks		
1983	The Dresser	Sir		
1984	Under the Volcano	Geoffrey Firmin		
1987	Orphans	Harold		
1990	Miller's Crossing	Liam 'Leo' O'Bannon		
1990	Roger Waters – The Wall – Live in Berlin	The Judge		
1992	The Playboys	Constable Brendan Hegarty		
1993	Rich in Love	Warren Odom		
1994	The Browning Version	Andrew Crocker-Harris		
1994	A Man of No Importance	Alfred Byrne		
1995	The Run of the Country	Danny's Father		
1997	Washington Square	Dr. Austin Sloper		
1999	Breakfast of Champions	Kilgore Trout		
1999	Simpatico	Simms		
2000	Erin Brockovich	Ed Masry		
2000	Traffic	White House Chief of Staff		
2001	Delivering Milo	Elmore Dahl		
2003	Big Fish	Edward Bloom Sr.		
2004	Ocean's Twelve	Gaspar LeMarc	Uncredited cameo	
2005	Corpse Bride	Finis Everglot	Voice	
2006	A Good Year	Uncle Henry Skinner		
2006	Amazing Grace	John Newton		
2007	The Bourne Ultimatum	Dr. Albert Hirsch		
2007	Before the Devil Knows You're Dead	Charles Hanson		
2012	The Bourne Legacy	Dr. Albert Hirsch		
2012	Skyfall	Mr. Kincade	Final film role	

=== Television ===
Television performances
Year	Title	Role	Notes	Refs.
1959	Emergency – Ward 10	Tom Fletcher	4 episodes	
1968–1977	The Tonight Show Starring Johnny Carson	Himself	2 episodes	
1968–1977	The Merv Griffin Show	Himself	2 episodes	
1977	The Mike Douglas Show	Himself	1 episode	
1982	Late Night with David Letterman	Himself	1 episode	
1984	Pope John Paul II	Karol Wojtyła, Pope John Paul II	Television movie	
1989	The Endless Game	Agent, Alec Hillsden	TV miniseries; 2 episodes	
1990	The Image	Jason Cromwell	Television movie	
1990	The Green Man	Maurice Allington	3 episodes	
1996	Karaoke	Daniel Feeld	4 episodes	
1996	Cold Lazarus	Daniel Feeld	4 episodes	
1997	Nostromo	Dr. Monygham	4 episodes	
1998	A Rather English Marriage	Reggie	Television movie	
2001–2003	My Uncle Silas	Uncle Silas	9 episodes	
2002	The Gathering Storm	Winston Churchill	Television movie	

=== Stage ===
Stage performances
Year	Title	Role	Theatre	Refs.
1956	Henry V	King Henry	Birmingham Repertory Theatre	
1957	The Lizard on the Rock	Malcolm	Birmingham Repertory Theatre	
1958	The Party	Soya	New Theatre	
1959	Coriolanus	Coriolanus	Royal Shakespeare Theatre	
1961	Luther	Martin Luther	Royal Court Theatre	
1963	Luther	Martin Luther	Lunt-Fontanne Theatre	
1965	Black Comedy	Harold Gorringe	Old Vic Theatre	
1965	Much Ado About Nothing	Don Pedro	Old Vic Theatre	
1965–1966	Miss Julie	Jean	Old Vic Theatre	
1966	A Flea in Her Ear	Victor Emmanuel Chandebise	Old Vic Theatre	
1968	A Day in the Death of Joe Egg	Bri	Brooks Atkinson Theatre	
1976	Hamlet	Prince Hamlet	Royal National Theatre	
1976	Tamburlaine	Tamburlaine	Royal National Theatre	
1978	The Cherry Orchard	Lopakhin	Royal National Theatre	
1984	Serjeant Musgrave's Dance	Serjeant Musgrave	Old Vic Theatre	
1986	Orphans	Harold	Apollo Theatre	
1996	'Art'	Marc	Wyndham's Theatre	

== Awards and nominations ==
Finney declined the offer of a CBE in 1980, as well as a knighthood in 2000. He criticised such honours as "perpetuating snobbery".

Year	Association	Category	Nominated work	Result	Ref
1961	BAFTA Awards	Best British Actor	Saturday Night and Sunday Morning	Nominated	
1961	BAFTA Awards	Most Promising Newcomer to Leading Film Roles	Saturday Night and Sunday Morning	Won	
1961	National Board of Review	Best Actor	Saturday Night and Sunday Morning	Won	
1961	Mar del Plata International Film Festival	Best Actor	Saturday Night and Sunday Morning	Won	
1964	Academy Awards	Best Actor	Tom Jones	Nominated	
1964	BAFTA Awards	Best British Actor	Tom Jones	Nominated	
1964	Golden Globe Awards	Best Actor – Motion Picture Musical or Comedy	Tom Jones	Nominated	
1964	Golden Globe Awards	New Star of the Year – Actor	Tom Jones	Won	
1964	Tony Awards	Tony Award for Best Actor in a Play	Luther	Nominated	
1968	Tony Awards	Tony Award for Best Actor in a Play	A Day in the Death of Joe Egg	Nominated	
1971	Golden Globe Awards	Best Actor – Motion Picture Musical or Comedy	Scrooge	Won	
1972	BAFTA Awards	Best Actor	Gumshoe	Nominated	
1975	Academy Awards	Best Actor	Murder on the Orient Express	Nominated	
1975	BAFTA Awards	Best Actor	Murder on the Orient Express	Nominated	
1976	Olivier Awards	Best Actor in a Revival	Hamlet and Tamburlaine the Great	Nominated	
1982	Saturn Awards	Best Actor	Wolfen	Nominated	
1983	BAFTA Awards	Best Actor	Shoot the Moon	Nominated	
1983	Golden Globe Awards	Best Actor – Motion Picture Drama	Shoot the Moon	Nominated	
1984	Academy Awards	Best Actor	The Dresser	Nominated	
1984	Golden Globe Awards	Best Actor – Motion Picture Drama	The Dresser	Nominated	
1985	Academy Awards	Best Actor	Under the Volcano	Nominated	
1985	BAFTA Awards	Best Actor	The Dresser	Nominated	
1985	Golden Globe Awards	Best Actor – Motion Picture Drama	Under the Volcano	Nominated	
1985	London Film Critics' Circle Awards	Actor of the Year	Under the Volcano	Won	
1986	Olivier Awards	Best Actor	Orphans	Won	
1990	Primetime Emmy Awards	Outstanding Lead Actor in a Miniseries or a Movie	The Image	Nominated	
1991	BAFTA TV Awards	Best Actor on Television	The Green Man	Nominated	
1994	Boston Society of Film Critics Awards	Boston Society of Film Critics Award for Best Actor	The Browning Version	Won	
1997	BAFTA TV Awards	Best Actor on Television	Cold Lazarus	Nominated	
1997	BAFTA TV Awards	Best Actor on Television	Karaoke	Nominated	
1999	BAFTA TV Awards	Best Actor on Television	A Rather English Marriage	Nominated	
2000	Boston Society of Film Critics Awards	Boston Society of Film Critics Award for Best Supporting Actor	Erin Brockovich	Nominated	
2001	Academy Awards	Best Supporting Actor	Erin Brockovich	Nominated	
2001	BAFTA Awards	Best Actor in a Supporting Role	Erin Brockovich	Nominated	
2001	Blockbuster Entertainment Awards	Favorite Supporting Actor – Drama	Erin Brockovich	Nominated	
2001	Chicago Film Critics Association Awards	Best Supporting Actor	Erin Brockovich	Nominated	
2001	Golden Globe Awards	Best Supporting Actor – Motion Picture	Erin Brockovich	Nominated	
2001	London Film Critics' Circle Awards	British Supporting Actor of the Year	Erin Brockovich	Won	
2001	Online Film Critics Society Awards	Best Supporting Actor	Erin Brockovich	Nominated	
2001	Satellite Awards	Best Supporting Actor – Motion Picture	Erin Brockovich	Nominated	
2001	Actor Awards	Outstanding Performance by a Cast in a Motion Picture	Traffic	Won	
2001	Actor Awards	Outstanding Performance by a Male Actor in a Supporting Role	Erin Brockovich	Won	
2002	Primetime Emmy Awards	Outstanding Lead Actor in a Miniseries or a Movie	The Gathering Storm	Won	
2003	BAFTA TV Awards	Best Actor on Television	The Gathering Storm	Won	
2003	Broadcasting Press Guild Awards	Best Actor	The Gathering Storm	Won	
2003	Golden Globe Awards	Best Actor – Miniseries or Television Film	The Gathering Storm	Won	
2003	Satellite Awards	Best Actor – Miniseries or Television Film	The Gathering Storm	Nominated	
2003	Screen Actors Guild Awards	Outstanding Performance by a Male Actor in a Miniseries or Television Movie	The Gathering Storm	Nominated	
2004	BAFTA Awards	Best Actor in a Supporting Role	Big Fish	Nominated	
2004	Golden Globe Awards	Golden Globe Award for Best Supporting Actor – Motion Picture	Big Fish	Nominated	
2004	Saturn Awards	Best Actor	Big Fish	Nominated	
2007	Gotham Awards	Best Ensemble Cast	Before the Devil Knows You're Dead	Won	
2008	Broadcast Film Critics Association Awards	Best Cast	Before the Devil Knows You're Dead	Nominated	
2008	London Film Critics' Circle Awards	British Supporting Actor of the Year	Before the Devil Knows You're Dead	Nominated	

=== Other awards ===
Other awards include: a Golden Laurel for his work on Scrooge (1970) and for his work on Tom Jones, for which he was the 3rd Place Winner for the "Top Male Comedy Performance" for 1964. He was honoured by the Los Angeles Film Critics Association as Best Actor for Under the Volcano (which he tied with F. Murray Abraham for Amadeus), the National Board of Review Best Actor award for Saturday Night and Sunday Morning, and the New York Film Critics Circle Best Actor award for Tom Jones.

Finney won two Screen Actors Guild Awards, for Best Performance by a Male Actor in a Supporting Role, for Erin Brockovich, and as a member of the acting ensemble in the film Traffic. He was also nominated for The Gathering Storm, for Best Performance by a Male Actor in a Television Movie or Miniseries, but did not win.

He won the Silver Berlin Bear award for Best Actor, for The Dresser, at the 34th Berlin International Film Festival in 1984.

He won the Volpi Cup for Best Actor, for Tom Jones, at the 24th Venice International Film Festival.

In 2001, Finney was awarded the BAFTA Fellowship for his achievements in film.

== See also ==
- List of Academy Award winners and nominees from Great Britain
- List of actors with Academy Award nominations
- List of actors with more than one Academy Award nomination in the acting categories
- List of British actors
- List of Golden Globe winners
- List of people who have declined a British honour
- List of Primetime Emmy Award winners
