= The Troubles in Newtownbutler =

Incidents in Newtownbutler, Northern Ireland during the Troubles

The Troubles in Newtownbutler is a list incidents during The Troubles in Newtownbutler, County Fermanagh, Northern Ireland.

== 1972 ==
- 13 February 1972 – Thomas McCann (19), an off-duty member of the British Army, was found shot near Newtownbutler. The Provisional Irish Republican Army (Provisional IRA) admitted the killing.
- 8 June 1972 – Samuel Donegan (60), an Inspector of the Garda Síochána, was killed by a Provisional Irish Republican Army booby trap bomb left by the side of the road at Legykelly, very near Wattlebridge, a few miles south of Newtownbutler. Inspector Donegan had strayed a few yards over the border from County Cavan into County Fermanagh.
- 7 August 1972 – William Creighton (27), an off-duty member of the Ulster Defence Regiment (UDR), was shot outside his home, near Newtownbutler, by the Provisional Irish Republican Army.
- 28 August 1972 – William Trotter (57), a Protestant civilian, was killed by a Provisional Irish Republican Army booby trap bomb in a field on his farm, near Newtownbutler.
- 22 October 1972 – John Bell (22), an off-duty member of the Ulster Defence Regiment (UDR), was shot at his farm, Derrydoon, near Newtownbutler, by the Provisional Irish Republican Army.
- 24 October 1972 – Michael Naan (31) and Andrew Murray (24), Catholic civilians, were found stabbed to death at the Naan family farm at Aughnahinch, on the southern outskirts of Newtownbutler. They were murdered by members of a patrol from the Argyll and Sutherland Highlanders on suspicion that they were IRA members. These murders became known as 'the Pitchfork Murders'.

== 1973 ==
- 12 October 1973 – Raymond McAdam (24), a Catholic civilian, was killed during a Provisional IRA bomb attack on Nicholl's Shop at Annaghmore Glebe, very near Wattlebridge, a few miles south of Newtownbutler. The shop was located right beside Gortnacarrow Bridge.

== 1977 ==
- 9 January 1977 – Martin Walsh (28), a member of the British Army, was killed by a Provisional Irish Republican Army booby trap bomb left in a shop at Gortnacarrow, near Wattlebridge, a few miles south of Newtownbutler.

== 1979 ==
- 12 July 1979 – Michael Kearney (21), a member of the Provisional Irish Republican Army, was found shot near Newtownbutler. Alleged informer.

== 1980 ==
- 3 January 1980 – Robert Crilly (60), an off-duty reservist member of the Royal Ulster Constabulary (RUC), was shot at his workplace on the Main Street, Newtownbutler, by the Provisional Irish Republican Army.
- 17 April 1980 – Victor Morrow (61), an ex-Ulster Defence Regiment member, was shot near to his home, Newtownbutler, by the Provisional Irish Republican Army.
- 7 June 1980 – Richard ('Richie') Latimer (39), an off-duty member of the Ulster Defence Regiment, was shot at his hardware shop located on the Main Street, Newtownbutler, by the Provisional Irish Republican Army.
