= Wattlebridge =

Hamlet in County Fermanagh in Northern Ireland

Wattlebridge Droichead na nGad
- Hamlet
- Location within Northern Ireland
- Coordinates: 54.130°N 7.350°W
- Jurisdiction: Northern Ireland
- Province: Ulster
- County: County Fermanagh
- Barony: Coole

Wattlebridge (Irish: Droichead na nGad), sometimes written as Wattle Bridge, is a hamlet in the south-southeast of County Fermanagh in Northern Ireland. It is located almost 3½ miles (5.5 kilometres) south of Newtownbutler. The hamlet is in a region known unofficially as South Ulster.

Wattlebridge is close to Fermanagh's boundary with both County Cavan and County Monaghan, being just north of the border between Northern Ireland and the Republic of Ireland. The Finn River flows through it, the river entering Upper Lough Erne a short distance to the west of Wattlebridge. The Wattlebridge Road (the B533), part of the main road between Cavan Town and Lisnaskea, runs via Wattlebridge. This road joins the Cavan Road (often known locally as 'the Concession Road'), part of the A3, at a junction on the southern edge of the hamlet. The A3 becomes the N54 at the townland of Leggykelly in County Cavan, this townland being very close to Wattlebridge. The Cavan Road, or 'the Concession Road', part of the N54 / A3, is the main Cavan Town to Clones road.

Immediately to the east and northeast of Wattlebridge is Drummully, a small district also known as 'the Sixteen Townlands' or 'Coleman's Island'. Drummully is a 'pene-enclave' of County Monaghan, being almost completely surrounded by County Fermanagh. The N54 / A3 passes through Drummully.

About a third of a mile to the west of Wattlebridge is Castle Saunderson, a now ruined country house in County Cavan. The 'castle' is located on the Castle Saunderson Demesne and is separated from County Fermanagh by the Finn River. The current Castle Saunderson was largely built in the late 1770s or early 1780s, being expanded and heavily remodelled in the 1830s.

The hamlet of Wattlebridge straddles two townlands: Edergool, which lies on the northern bank of the Finn River, and Annaghmore Glebe, which lies on the southern bank of the Finn River. Edergool is usually known locally as Wattlebridge.

== Name ==
Wattlebridge gets its name from the original bridge that spanned the Finn River at this point. This bridge may have been built in the sixteenth century, and was made of wattle, the bridge being supported by stakes called 'gads'. The current bridge, which is known as Wattle Bridge or Wattlebridge Bridge, is built from stone and probably stands on or very near the site of the original bridge. The Wattlebridge Road, the B533, runs over this bridge.

== Notable people ==
- Ray McAdam (b. 1984), a former Lord Mayor of Dublin. Councillor McAdam has been an elected member of Dublin City Council since 2009, representing Fine Gael, and served as Lord Mayor of Dublin from 2025 to 2026. He was born in County Cavan, but was raised in the townland of Gortnacarrow, very near Wattlebridge. His father was from the neighbouring townland of Annaghmore Glebe.

== See also ==
- Death of Samuel Donegan
- The Troubles in Newtownbutler
