= Castle Saunderson =

Castle in County Cavan, Ireland

Coordinates: 54.125°N 7.352°W

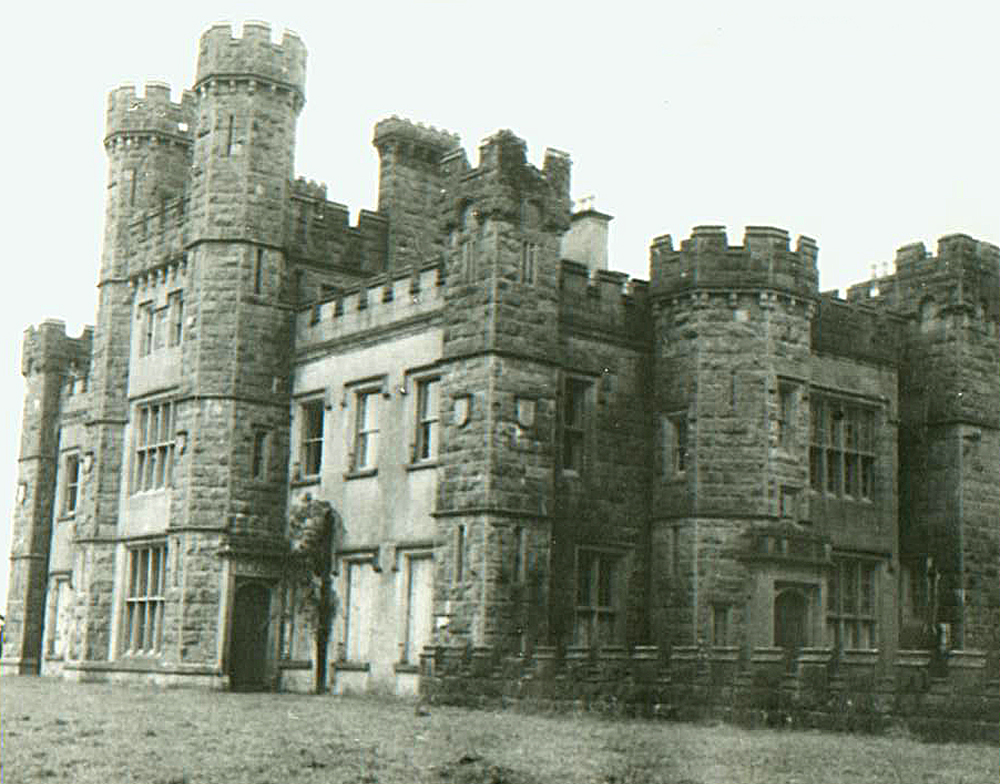

- Location within Ireland

General information
- Status: Private dwelling house
- Type: House
- Architectural style: Gothic revival
- Classification: Ruined
- Location: Belturbet, County Cavan, Ireland
- Renovated: 1835 (substantially remodelled)
- Owner: Scouting Ireland

Technical details
- Material: limestone

Design and construction
- Architect: George Sudden
- Developer: Saunderson family

Castle Saunderson (Irish: Caisleán Shandarsan) is a castle near Belturbet in County Cavan, Ireland. It was the former family seat of the Saunderson family, and is now in ruins. The Finn River flows along the north-eastern edge of the Castle Saunderson Demesne, where the river enters a narrow channel of Upper Lough Erne. The castle is about a half a mile west from Wattlebridge, a small hamlet in the south-south-east of County Fermanagh.

The Castle Saunderson International Scouting Centre is a Scouting Ireland facility, opened in 2012 within the grounds of the castle. The centre provides indoor accommodation and campsites covering 34 acres (14 ha). It is open to Scouts year round, as well as to non-Scouts for most of the year. It currently acts as a World Scouting Centre for the Scouts, alongside Cairo International Scout Centre in Egypt and others.

== History ==
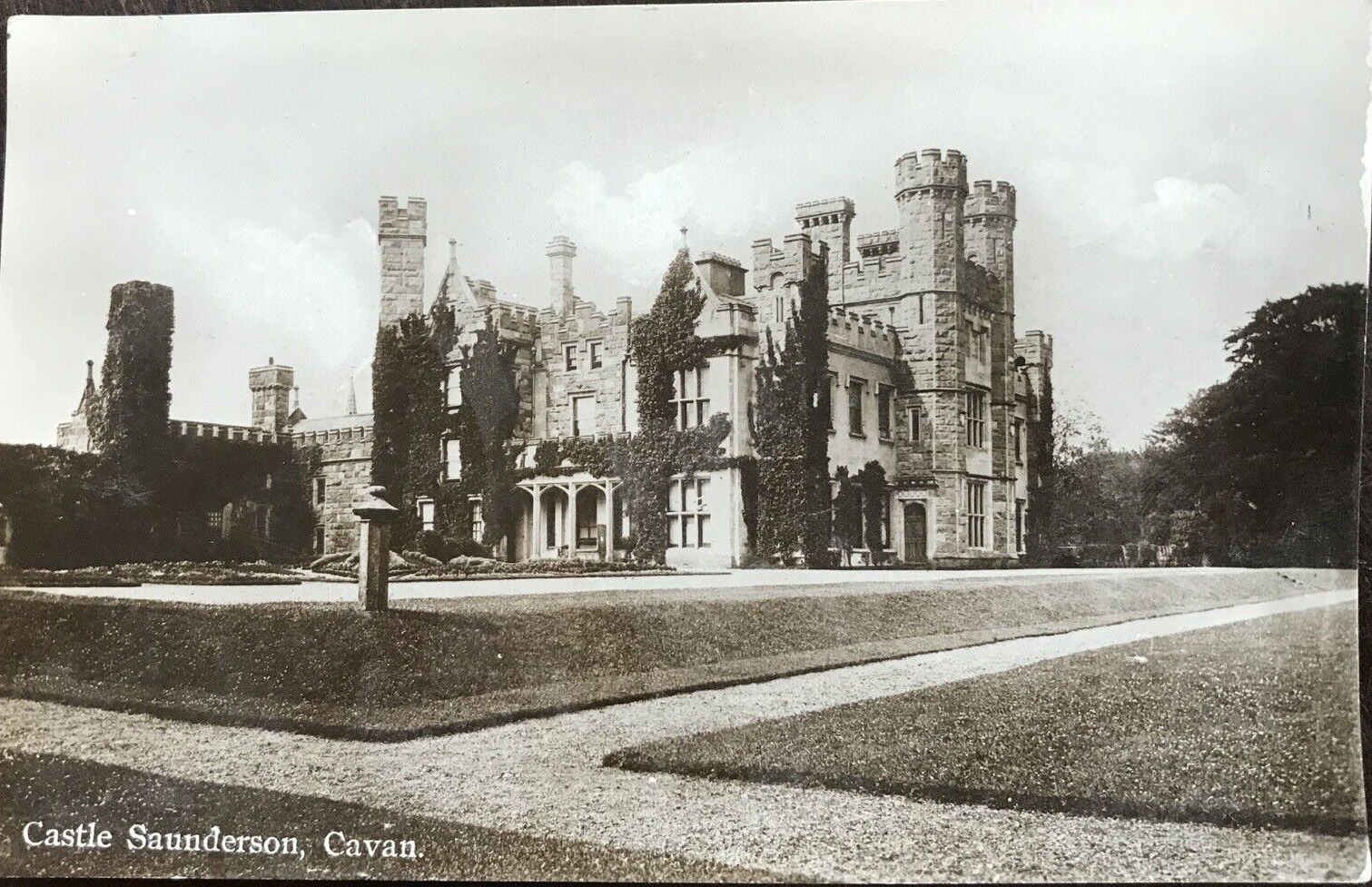
A view of the castle in the early 20th century

=== Family home ===
The Saunderson family acquired the original castle during the Plantation of Ulster. The original castle was inhabited by the O'Reillys of Breffni and was formerly known as Breffni Castle from the 14th century. Robert Sanderson inherited the castle from his father in 1676, before fighting on the side of William III during the Williamite War in Ireland, in which James II's troops burned the castle in 1689. Months later, 400 of James II's soldiers were ambushed here while on retreat from the battle at Newtownbutler. They were driven toward the Finn River and many drowned.

The present castle dates to 1840 and was destroyed by fire in 1990. Edward James Saunderson, a founder of the Ulster Unionist Party, was born in the castle, and it hosted Orange Order events celebrating The Twelfth. Major Frederick John Sandys Lindesay of Loughry and Tullyhogue died there while a guest in 1877. The Hon. Barry Maxwell, eldest son and heir apparent of The 10th Baron Farnham, died in a cycling accident on the estate in 1879.

The last Saunderson who owned the castle was Edward's grandson, Captain Alexander "Sandy" Saunderson. He was a prisoner of war during the Second World War and was later present at the War Tribunal at Nuremberg as the legal advisor to Lord Justice Lawrence. He sold the property to a businessman in 1977. He had planned to use it as a residence, but this never transpired. It later served as a hotel, but was damaged by fire, the third fire to occur at the castle.

The Castle Saunderson Demesne, currently only 103 acres (42 ha), has entrances in County Fermanagh in Northern Ireland and County Cavan in the Republic of Ireland. The demesne includes a church with crypt and family graveyard.

=== International Scout Centre ===
In 1997 the castle and its grounds were acquired by Scouting Ireland (CSI). The subsequent formation of Scouting Ireland, and financial difficulties, delayed its development, and put the campsite project in doubt. With support from the American Ireland Fund and Cavan County Council, substantial progress occurred, with the announcement in November 2008 of EU funding for the project, amounting to over €3 million.

Michael D. Higgins, president of Ireland, opened the €3.7 million European-funded Castle Saunderson International Scouting Centre in County Cavan on 18 August 2012. The President was joined by dignitaries from both sides of the Border, including Northern Ireland Executive Ministers Jonathan Bell, Nelson McCausland and Jennifer McCann, and Minister of State in the Republic, Fergus O’Dowd.

In February 2015, Heather Humphreys, Minister for Arts, Heritage and the Gaeltacht, announced the approval of the restoration by Waterways Ireland of a canal, part of the Ulster Canal, connecting the site to the Erne basin.

The site delivers programmes which complement the Messenger of Peace Award.

The centre was used by the Health Service Executive as a mass testing centre during the COVID-19 pandemic.
