= Scotshouse =

Village in County Monaghan, Ireland

Scotshouse Teach an Scotaigh
- Village
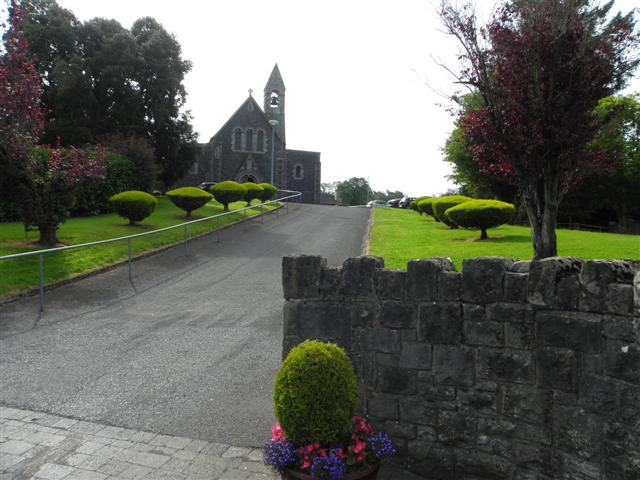
- Church of the Immaculate Conception, Scotshouse

- Location in Ireland
- Coordinates: 54.122°N 7.249°W
- Country: Ireland
- Province: Ulster
- County: County Monaghan
- Barony: Dartree
- Elevation: 71 m (233 ft)

Population (2016)
  - Total: 220
- Irish Grid Reference: H500257

Scotshouse (Irish: Teach an Scotaigh) is a small agricultural village in the parish of Currin in County Monaghan, Ireland. It is roughly three miles east of where the counties of Cavan, Fermanagh and Monaghan meet. Scotshouse is about 7 kilometres (4 mi) from Clones, 18 km (11 mi) from Cavan town and 27 km (17 mi) away from Monaghan town.

Scotshouse is in the townland of Aghnahola (Irish: Achadh na hAbhla, meaning 'field of the apples'). Finn Bridge, a border crossing on the Finn River, is west of Scotshouse.

== Churches ==
There are two churches in Scotshouse; St. Andrew's Church (Church of Ireland) and the Church of the Immaculate Conception (Roman Catholic).

The former, St. Andrew's Church, celebrated its 200th anniversary in 2010. It contains a memorial stained glass window for those who died in the First World War and a memorial plaque to Ernest Waldron King, an assistant purser with the White Star Line who died when the Titanic sank. The church and its graveyard are both protected regional structures (reference numbers 41401610 and 41401615, respectively).

The Church of the Immaculate Conception, built in 1924, is a gable-fronted structure of Romanesque appearance. The church has a stained glass window and a carved plaque with a Celtic cross motif. It is a protected regional structure (reference numbers 41401608).

== People ==
- Thomas Fitzpatrick (1918–2006), former chairman of the Dáil
- Hugh MacMahon (1660–1737), Archbishop of Armagh
- Éamonn Ó Ciardha, lecturer in University of Ulster in Magee Campus, Derry City
- Séamus P. Ó Mórdha (1915–2005), professor of Irish in St Patrick's College, Dublin

== See also ==
- List of towns and villages in Ireland
