= Redhills, County Cavan =

Village in County Cavan, Ireland

Redhills An Cnoc Rua
- Village
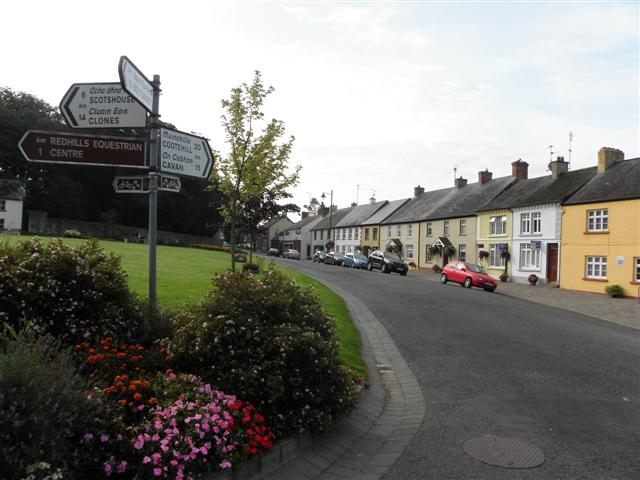
- Houses along the village green

- Location in Ireland
- Coordinates: 54°06′N 7°19′W
- Country: Ireland
- Province: Ulster
- County: County Cavan
- Barony: Tullygarvey
- Time zone: UTC+0 (WET)
  - Summer (DST): UTC-1 (IST (WEST))
- Irish Grid Reference: H444170

Redhills (Irish: An Cnoc Rua), historically Knockroe, is a village in northern County Cavan, Ireland. It is near the N54 road and is home to Redhills GAA club, which has produced four Cavan Inter-County players. The Finn River flows a short distance to the north of Redhills.

The 1992 film, The Playboys, was filmed on location in the village, as was the 1995 film The Run of the Country. Both films were scripted by Oscar nominee and Redhills native, Shane Connaughton. Connaughton's books A Border Station (1989) and The Run of the Country (1991) are also set in the village.

== Transport ==
Local Link bus route C3 was introduced on 30 July 2018 and links the village to Ballyhaise and Cavan. There are three services in each direction Mondays to Saturdays and an additional three journeys each way on Friday and Saturday evenings. With two services in each direction on Sundays and Bank Holidays. Onward coach and bus connections are available in Cavan.

== See also ==
- List of towns and villages in Ireland
