= A3 road (Northern Ireland) =

Major road in Northern Ireland

Coordinates: 54.46335°N 6.28667°W

A3

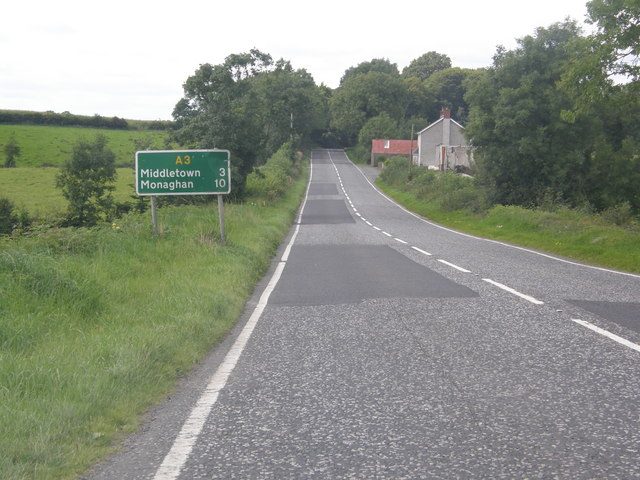

Major junctions
- East end: Lisburn
- A1 in Lisburn M1 Junction 9 A26 in Lurgan A27 in Craigavon A4 in Portadown A51 in Armagh A28 in Armagh A29 in Armagh
- West end: Outside Middletown, road crosses into County Monaghan in the Republic, becoming the N12 until Monaghan. From Monaghan, the N12 becomes the N54 until Clones, becoming the A3 again in County Fermanagh from there until it crosses back across the border, when it becomes the N54 until back in County Fermanagh in N.I., linking the B533, then crossing the Border again as the N54 (Republic) until Cavan.

Location
- Country: United Kingdom
- Constituent country: Northern Ireland
- Primary destinations: Lisburn; Lurgan; Portadown; Armagh; Monaghan; Clones; Cavan

Road network
- Roads in Northern Ireland; Motorways; A roads in Northern Ireland

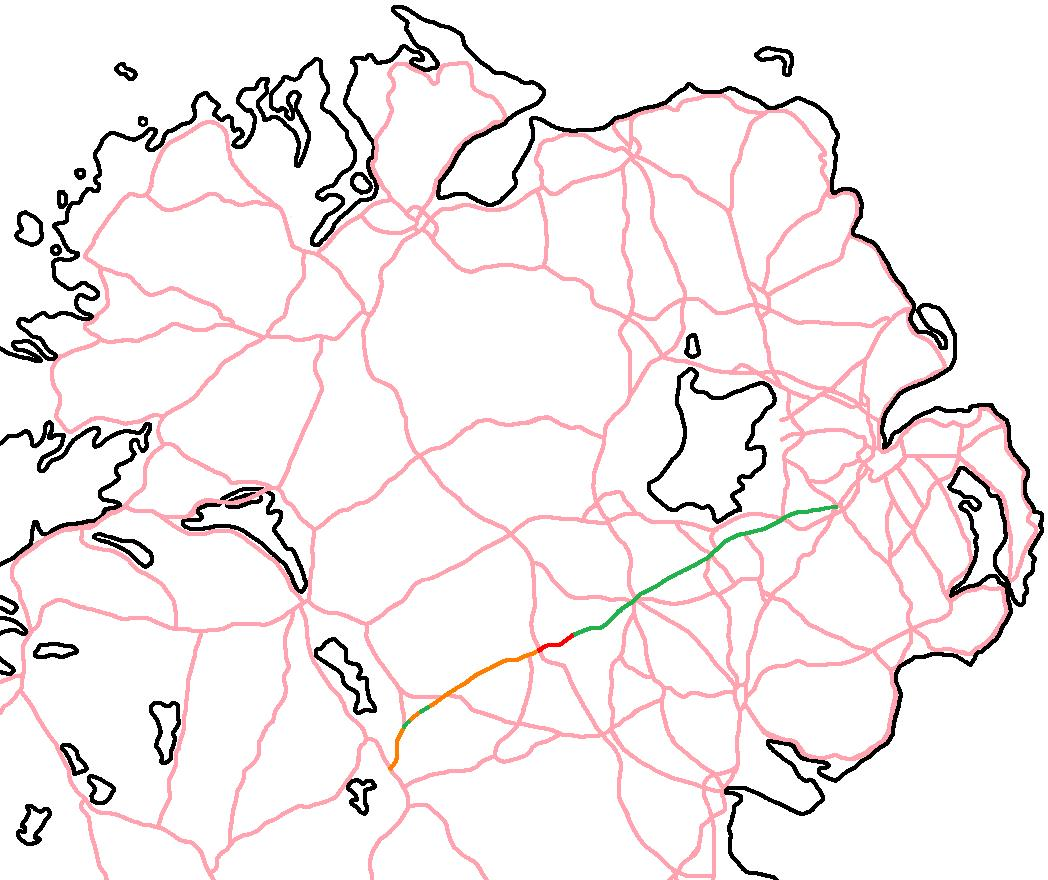
The route of the A3 in green from Lisburn city centre (Co. Antrim) towards Cavan town. The N12 is red, and the N54 is shaded orange to show the continuation of the road through the Republic.

The A3 is a major road in Northern Ireland. It travels through County Antrim, County Down, County Armagh and parts of southern County Fermanagh.

The route branches off the A1, and from the start of the route at Lisburn to the border near Middletown, County Armagh, it is a primary route. The A3 is also the designated road number for the sections of the Irish N54 secondary route which lie in Northern Ireland. These sections carry secondary route status.

== Route ==
The A3 begins by proceeding ahead at a crossroads in Lisburn city centre, where the A1 veers to the left. It continues through the eastern suburbs of Lisburn before it comes to Junction 9 of the M1, where it intersects with the A26 travelling southwards from Antrim. The A3 carries the course of the A26 through the villages of Moira and Magheralin, before the A26 branches off again upon entering Lurgan, heading towards Banbridge.

The A3 continues through the town centre of Lurgan, and becomes dual carriageway from the outskirts of Lurgan through a series of roundabouts in what was planned as the new city of Craigavon. At "Central Roundabout", the A3 veers north-easterly onto "Northway", a single-carriageway by-pass of Portadown. The A3 also meets the A27 from Craigavon Area Hospital at this roundabout. "Northway" was originally planned to be an extension of the M12 into the centre of Craigavon, but like many parts of the planned town, it was not built. Close to Portadown town centre, the A4 branches off towards Dungannon and Maghery, and the A3 continues to the city of Armagh, bypassing the village of Richhill.

On entering Armagh, the road meets a series of other main roads leading to the city along a half-ring road; firstly the A51 from Gilford, then the A28 from Newry and the A29 from Dundalk. It then continues its route through the villages of Milford and Middletown before reaching the border with the Republic of Ireland and County Monaghan in the townland of Ardgonnell. The road continues as the N12 to Monaghan and then as the N54 towards Cavan.

The Monaghan–Cavan road resumes the A3 designation twice, where it enters southeast Fermanagh: first from the western outskirts of Clones for two miles, before reverting to the N54 in the Drummully salient in County Monaghan, part of the Republic; then again for another short stretch where it meets the B533 from Newtownbutler at a Y-junction at Wattlebridge before reverting again to the N54 until it meets the N3 at Butlersbridge, on the north-western edge of Cavan Town. Whereas the main A3 section from Lisburn to the border near Monaghan is a primary route, the two Fermanagh sections have 'secondary status' as B roads.

== Planned developments ==
At present, the Department for Regional Development plan a series of future road schemes for the A3:

- A link road through the northern and western areas of Armagh city, with a further link in the southwestern part of the city, construction timetable for after 2015
- Improvements to the junctions on the Northway at Portadown; construction timetabled for after 2015
