= The Playboys =

1992 film by Gillies MacKinnon

- Theatrical release poster
- Directed by: Gillies MacKinnon
- Written by: Shane Connaughton; Kerry Crabbe
- Produced by: William P. Cartlidge
- Starring: Albert Finney; Aidan Quinn; Robin Wright; Milo O'Shea
- Cinematography: Jack Conroy
- Edited by: Humphrey Dixon
- Music by: Jean-Claude Petit
- Production company: The Samuel Goldwyn Company
- Distributed by: The Samuel Goldwyn Company
- Release dates: 22 April 1992 (US); 29 May 1992 (UK)
- Running time: 110 minutes
- Country: Ireland
- Language: English
- Budget: $6 million
- Box office: $4,906,900

The Playboys is a 1992 Irish film directed by Gillies MacKinnon and starring Albert Finney, Aidan Quinn and Robin Wright. The plot follows an unwed young mother whose life is transformed with the arrival of a travelling troupe of actors to her Irish village. The script was written by Shane Connaughton, an Oscar nominee for My Left Foot. The film was shot in his native village Redhills, in County Cavan, Ireland.

== Plot ==
In a small Irish village in 1957, Tara Maguire, a young resolute woman, is the talk of the town because she is having a baby out of wedlock, and refuses to name the father. During Sunday mass she goes into labour giving birth to a baby boy. Sergeant Brendan Hegarty, the local police officer of the Garda Síochána, and Mick, a local landowner, vie for Tara's hand in marriage, but she refuses them both.

Mick loses his cattle and facing financial ruin commits suicide. People in town blame his death on Tara's rejection. The local priest, Father Malone, attempts to compel Tara to marry the constable before another tragedy takes place. But Tara is not in love with the solemn and older Sgt. Hegarty, a reformed alcoholic, who hides the fury of his unrequited love for Tara in his devotion for her. He carves a cradle for the baby, but Tara vehemently refuses the gift and his attentions.

The beautiful and strong willed Tara lives with her sister Brigid and is determined to make it on her own. She supplements her income as a dressmaker, raising chickens in her garden and smuggling goods from the nearby border with Northern Ireland. However, in this she has to face Hegarty who discovers her secret illegal dealings while riding his bicycle at night looking for smugglers on the roads.

The arrival of a shabby troupe of travelling actors called the "Playboys", stirs the town. Tara surprises Tom, one of the actors, stealing one of her chickens. He has to pay for it, but he is smitten with her beauty and her character. They flirt and spar around the village, all under the resentful eye of the constable. The Playboys are a success in the sleepy village and the tent is full when the show starts at night. One of their numbers with female dancers lifting their skirts causes a furious response from Father Malone, who has another opinion of what is wholesome entertainment. The actors are forced to switch to staging Othello. A blind woman gets so excited during a show that she suddenly regains her vision. Not only do the group of actors have to deal with discord when the time to share the dividends comes, but the recent arrival of television threatens the survival of their art.

The romance between Tara and Tom grows slowly over the few days the theatrical company is in the village. Her past has made her suspicious of men, and Sgt. Hegarty's intrusions provide an added obstacle. He tells her that Tom is a liar who already has a wife, which turns out not to be true. Sgt. Hegarty also confronts Tom and tells him that Hegarty is the father of the baby, but Tara assures Tom that not only she does not have any feelings for the constable but that the baby was conceived on a lonely night without deep feeling involved on her part.

One of the actors is involved with the IRA and has smuggled some explosives. When the explosives are accidentally discovered by Hegarty he blames his rival. Tom is framed as an IRA man, but he breaks out of jail with Tara's help. When Gone With the Wind plays at the local cinema, the actors stage an instant, improvised knock-off of it, with Atlanta burning while Tom struggles with his lines in the role of Rhett Butler. Comically, Fred has to take the role of Mammy. During the show the triangle between Tara, Tom and Sergeant Hegarty comes to a boiling point. The performance is interrupted by the frantic Brigid. Hegarty, drunk, has taken the baby. He comes to the tent, still drunk, but gives the baby back to Tara. There is a confrontation between Tom and the Sergeant, but the Sergeant painfully loses in a public fist fight with Tom. Even after this defeat, he trashes the tent. The next day the time for the playboys to leave has come. Hegarty, now jobless and in civilian clothes, also leaves the town for good. Tom is happily surprised when Tara decides to join the group with her baby and share a life together, perhaps in the end to take on a new life with Tom in America.

== Cast ==
- Albert Finney as Sergeant Hegarty
- Aidan Quinn as Tom
- Robin Wright as Tara
- Milo O'Shea as Freddie
- Alan Devlin as Father Malone
- Niamh Cusack as Brigid
- Ian McElhinney as Joe Cassidy
- Stella McCusker as Rachel
- Niall Buggy as Denzil
- Anna Livia Ryan as Vonnie
- Adrian Dunbar as Mick

== Reception ==
The Playboys received positive reviews from critics. It holds a rating of 92% on Rotten Tomatoes from 24 reviews.
