= Shane Connaughton =

Irish writer and actor

- Born: 4 April 1941 (age 85); Kingscourt, County Cavan, Ireland
- Occupations: Writer, actor
- Years active: 1975–present
- Spouse: Ann Connaughton

Shane Connaughton (born 4 April 1941 in Kingscourt, County Cavan) is an Irish writer and actor, probably best known as co-writer of the Academy Award-nominated screenplay for My Left Foot. He also co-wrote the screenplays for the Academy Award-winning 1980 short film The Dollar Bottom and 1992 film The Playboys, as well as other screenplays and plays. He won the Hennessy Award in 1985.

Connaughton is the author of the books A Border Station (1989), The Run of the Country (1991), and Big Parts (2009). He adapted The Run of the Country for the screen in 1995 and published a book about its filming, A Border Diary, the same year. A Border Station, a short story collection, was a bestseller in Ireland and was shortlisted for the Guinness Peat Award. His first two books are both set in the County Cavan village of Redhills, where he grew up, and The Playboys and The Run of the Country were filmed there.

Connaughton attended Bristol Old Vic Theatre School and has worked as a theatre and film actor, appearing in Coronation Street, Mike Leigh's Four Days in July, Neil Jordan's The Miracle, and The Playboys, among other roles. He acted in the 2020 award-winning black comedy, Redemption of a Rogue.

Connaughton is married and has two children. He lives in London much of the time.
