= Aghafin =

Townland in Clones Rural, County Monaghan, Ireland

Coordinates: 54°13′04″N 7°11′29″W

Aghafin (from Irish: Achadh Fionn, meaning "White River", referring to the River Finn) is a townland in the Electoral Division of Clones Rural, in the Barony of Dartree, in County Monaghan, Ireland.

== Geography ==
Aghafin has an area of 750,187 m^{2} (75.02 ha; 0.75 km^{2}). It is bounded on the north by Mullanahinch townland, on the west by Annachullion Glebe and Magheranure townlands, on the east by Drumaddagorry and Rathkeevan townlands, and on the south by Coraghy, Lisoarty and Longfield townlands. Its chief geographical features are Aghafin Lough which measures in length of 0.65 kilometres (0.40 mi) and the River Finn on its northern boundary.
