= Clones and Cavan Extension Railway =

Railway in Ireland

The Clones and Cavan Extension Railway was an extension of the Ulster Railway from Clones in County Monaghan to Cavan opened in 1862. The station in Cavan was opened firstly by the Midland Great Western Railway with trains to Dublin Broadstone. However the Ulster Railway also sought to connect Cavan with Belfast Great Victoria Street.
