= History Ireland =

Magazine

- Categories: History
- Frequency: Bimonthly
- Publisher: Wordwell Ltd.
- Founded: 1993
- First issue: Spring 1993; 33 years ago
- Company: History Publications Ltd
- Country: Ireland
- Based in: Dublin
- Language: English
- Website: www.historyireland.com
- ISSN: 0791-8224

History Ireland is a magazine with a focus on the history of Ireland. The first issue of the magazine appeared in Spring 1993. It went full-colour in 2004 and since 2005 it is published bi-monthly. It features articles by a range of writers and book reviews. The magazine's editor is Tommy Graham of the Tisch School of the Arts, New York University, Dublin Programme.
