= N54 road (Ireland) =

Road in Ireland

N54 road
- Bóthar N54
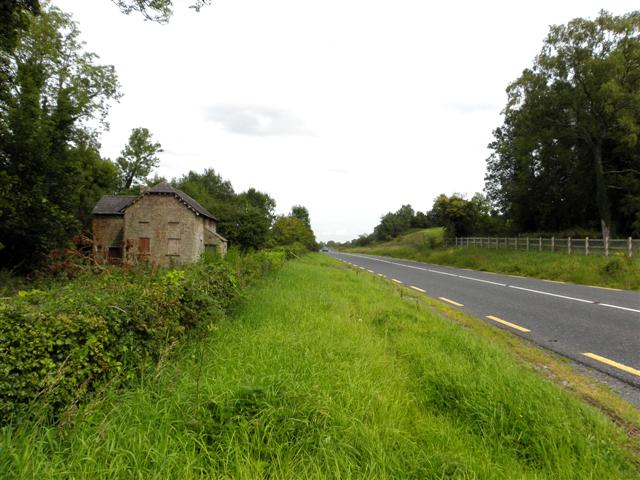
- The N54 in Drummully, between two sections of the A3 and inaccessible to the Gardaí

Route information
- Length: 34.626 km (21.516 mi)

Location
- Country: Ireland
- Primary destinations: County Cavan; Cavan; County Monaghan; Monaghan

Highway system
- Roads in Ireland; Motorways; Primary; Secondary; Regional

The N54 is a national secondary road in the Republic of Ireland connecting the towns of Monaghan and Cavan, crossing the Republic of Ireland–United Kingdom border several times. It is in three sections, separated by two sections in Northern Ireland classified as parts of the A3.

== Route ==
The N54 begins at a junction with the N2 near Monaghan, and runs west through Clones until reaching the boundary of County Fermanagh in Northern Ireland. From here, it crosses through Drummully (also known as Coleman's Island), an almost detached part of County Monaghan in the Republic, connected to the rest of the country by only a few metres. In 12 kilometres (7.5 mi), the main road between Clones and Cavan crosses the border four times. There are several minor side roads to the south of the road which also cross the border. The speed limits change between 80 kilometres per hour (50 mph) in the Republic and 60 miles per hour (97 km/h) in Northern Ireland. The central section between two sections of the Northern Irish A3 is only 3.5 kilometres (2.2 mi) long. The N54 ends on the N3 in Butler's Bridge, County Cavan, north of the town of Cavan.

== History ==
During The Troubles in the 1970s and the 1980s, many local roads leading into County Monaghan in the Republic were closed either by blocking with concrete, or being blown up by the British Army. The N54 / A3 was left open as a "Concession Road".

== Politics ==
As a result of Brexit, where the United Kingdom voted to leave the European Union and make the border an external EU border, the EU identified fifteen locations where customs or vehicle checks could potentially take place. Two of these are on the N54, one between Smithborough and Clones, the other between Clones and Butlers Bridge (where the N54 meets the N3).

Because the central section of the N54 in Drummully is inaccessible without driving through Northern Ireland, the Gardaí and the Police Service of Northern Ireland are not allowed to access it. As a consequence, it is used regularly for fly tipping, with piles of rubbish piled up next to the border. As seen elsewhere on the border, there are fireworks stores just the other side of the border on the A3, which are legal to sell over the counter in Northern Ireland, but illegal in the Republic.
