= National Youth Council of Ireland =

The National Youth Council of Ireland (NYCI) is a representative body for Irish youth organisations, a role that is recognised in the 2001 Youth Work Act. Currently there are 45 national youth organisations who are full member of the NYCI. The National Youth Council of Ireland is a nominating body for elections to Seanad Éireann.

The member organisations include a wide variety of youth organisations active at a national level and include youth club organisations, Scouting and Guiding or similar uniformed youth organisations, youth wings of political parties, Irish language youth organisations, and various other single issue and specialist youth groups.

NYCI is a member of the European apex organisation for youth organisations and councils called the European Youth Forum YFJ.

The NYCI publish a monthly newsletter called Clár na nÓg.

== Board ==
The board consists of a president, vice president, treasurer and 15 ordinary board members. As of February 2024, they were:

- Denis O’Brien - Foróige - President
- Nicola Toughey - Catholic Guides of Ireland - Vice President
- Mary Horgan - Youth Work Ireland - Treasurer
- Iarla Flynn - Google - Functional Director
- Conor Kirwan - Functional Director
- Patrick Manley - Department of Justice (Legal Aid Board) - Functional Director & Company Secretary
- Eve Moody - Irish Girl Guides
- Michael Power - Involve: National Association of Travellers’ Centres
- Mick Ferron - Sphere17 Regional Youth Service
- Reuban Murray - ISSU
- Greg Tierney - Crosscare
- Carmel Walsh - BeLongTo
- David Backhouse - YMCA
- RoseMarie Maughan - Irish Traveller Movement

Simon Harris served on the board of the NYCI in 2005. Dan Boyle is a former vice-president of the NYCI.

== Member organisations ==
As of 2024, the NYCI website listed over 50 member organisations:

- Amnesty International
- An Óige
- AsIAm
- Attic House
- BeLonG To
- Blakestown and Mountview Youth Initiative
- Boys Brigade
- Catholic Guides of Ireland
- Central Remedial Clinic
- Church of Ireland Youth Department
- Cobh Youth Services
- Coláiste na bhFiann
- Crosscare
- ECO-UNESCO
- EIL - Intercultural Learning
- Enable Ireland
- Community Games
- Feachtas
- Finglas Youth Resource Centre
- Foróige
- Friends of Africa
- Gaisce – The President’s Award
- Girls' Brigade Ireland
- Girls' Friendly Society
- ICTU Youth Committee
- Involve: National Association of Travellers’ Centres
- Irish Association of Youth Orchestras
- Irish Methodist Youth and Children’s Department
- Irish Second-Level Students' Union
- Irish Traveller Movement
- Irish Girl Guides
- Irish Red Cross Youth
- Irish Wheelchair Association
- Junior Chamber Ireland
- Killinarden Community Council Youth Project
- Labour Youth
- Localise - Youth Volunteering
- Macra na Feirme
- Migrant Rights Centre Ireland
- No Name Clubs
- Ógra Fianna Fáil
- Ógras
- Order of Malta Cadets
- Phoenix Youth Project
- Scouting Ireland
- Sphere17 Regional Youth Service
- Spunout
- St Andrews Resource Centre
- SVP Youth Clubs Council
- Swan Regional Youth Service
- Union of Students in Ireland
- Voluntary Service International
- The West End Youth Centre
- YMCA Ireland
- Young Christian Workers
- Young Fine Gael
- Young Irish Film Makers
- Young Social Innovators
- YWCA of Ireland
- Youth Theatre Ireland
- Youth Work Ireland
