= SPICES (Scouting) =

Learning objectives of several scout organisations

The SPICES (Social, Physical, Intellectual, Character/Creativity, Emotional and Spiritual) are learning objectives, or areas of personal development explored through scouting programmes in a number of countries. The acronym was created during the development of the ONE Programme scheme by Scouting Ireland, but has since been adopted by Scouts Canada, Scouts Australia, Scouts New Zealand and Scout Association of Malta. These objectives reflect the aims of Scouting rather than the methodologies – the Scout Method.

== Background ==
On the merging of legacy scout associations to create Scouting Ireland in 2004, a need was identified to merge or replace existing programmes into a unified youth programme, eventually becoming "ONE Programme". Thirty-six fundamental learning objectives, categorised as social, physical, intellectual, character, emotional and spiritual areas, were identified as the central aim of the organisation. Interim steps were identified so that these areas of growth could be targeted across the age ranges of the youth members.

The success of the ONE Programme development, prompted other scout organisations to base their youth programme revisions on Scouting Ireland's research. Some examples include, Scouts Canada, Scouts Australia, Scouts Aotearoa and the Scout Association of Malta.

== National implementations ==
=== Australia ===
The SPICES are adapted for each of the programme sections – Joeys, Cubs, Scouts, Venturers, Rovers.

=== Canada ===
As part of the "Canadian Path", from beaver scouts to rover scouts, the SPICES are considered the attributes that best represent well rounded youth, prepared for the world.

The Spiritual element is not necessarily religion focused, but could include a scout's relationship with an abrahamic god or connectedness with nature or the global community.

=== Ireland ===
In programme books and materials, for Beaver Scouts and Cub Scouts, the SPICES are represented by characters representing those traits. Beavers track their progress through the SPICES in the Bree (first year), Ruarc (second year) and Conn (third year) lodges. Cubs track their progress by marking their "travel cards" which contain a checklist of all the learning objectives. SPICES beads, and annual personal progress badges are awarded as the travel cards are filled. Venture Scouts plan activities based on a self-assessment of their current personal development using the SPICES (similar to a wheel of life tool). Scouts, Venture Scouts, Rover Scouts review their progress as part of the general review of programme cycles.

=== Malta ===
The "C" in SPICES has been adapted to represent "Creativity". The sections are cubs, scouts, ventures and rovers.

=== New Zealand ===
The SPICES are used in the five sections – Keas, Cubs, Scouts, Venturers, Rovers. Scouts Aotearoa has linked the SPICES to a similar concept from the Hauora philosophy of health and wellbeing. There are four dimensions (or whare walls) of hauora: taha tinana (physical well-being – health), taha hinengaro (mental and emotional well-being – self-confidence), taha whanau (social well-being – self-esteem) and taha wairua (spiritual well-being – personal beliefs).
