= Explorer Belt =

Scouting award

Explorer Belt award for Senior Scouts

The Explorer Belt Award

The Explorer Belt is an award in many Scouting organisations which promotes adventure and self-reliance in an international context.

While specific rules on the award vary from one organisation to another, it is generally for older members of the Scout Movement and requires a group of Scouts to travel and conduct a set of projects through which they investigate the history, geography, and society of a foreign country.

== In various countries ==
=== Germany ===
Within the Verband Christlicher Pfadfinderinnen und Pfadfinder, the Explorer Belt Expedition is open to members from 16 to 24 years of age.

Prior to the expedition, there are two weekend-meetings for planning and preparation. Each group/team consists of two people. Teams have to prepare a presentation, dealing with a subject in the country visited (cultural, historical, social...).

On the expedition participants travel the foreign country in the teams for 14 days, dealing with their subject. Afterwards there is a camp of one week, together with all participants and instructors.

The belts are awarded in a ceremony during the final meeting, after the expedition, usually a weekend.

In 2024, the Explorer Belt Expedition took place in the Pyrenees in the border region of Spain and France.

=== Finland ===
The award is open to members of the senior section of Scouting, and candidates work in pairs.

As the pair travel over 200 km during the 10-day expedition, they maintain a diary and conduct between 10 and 18 projects.

The expedition pairs are required to make presentations of their projects and experiences before being awarded the belt.

=== Ireland ===
The expedition is run nationally by each of Scouting Ireland, the Catholic Guides of Ireland and the Irish Girl Guides, with the core requirement of pairs logging 200 km from an unknown starting point.

==== Scouting Ireland ====
Pairs of Rover Scouts are dropped off at an undisclosed location and are required over the course of ten days to return to basecamp. Participants must walk which a minimum distance of 200 km, but have the option of completing an extra 100 km by public transport. The expedition is open to Rover Scouts aged between 18 and 26.

The teams must complete a daily log as well as personal and group projects to an acceptable standard while living on a limited budget. The projects cover topics relevant to local life and culture, and are developed with the intention of having the teams interact with locals while learning about the history, culture and life of the region. The teams must also carry all equipment needed to complete the expedition. Rucksacks can often weigh in the range 12 to 22 kilograms. This equipment can include tentage, sleeping gear, clothes, cooking equipment, first aid equipment, fuel, water, stationary, and whatever food has been purchased from the budget. On reaching basecamp, the teams are given time to recover during which an assessment team read through the expedition logs and projects. They also examine whether the minimum distance of 200 km has been completed. Following the assessment phase, Rover Scouts deemed to have met the conditions of the award are presented with the Explorer Belt at a ceremony held at the end of the expedition. Traditionally, those who have received the belt do not wear it, unless everyone present achieved the belt, until after they have returned home to Ireland, for example In 1983 (Wales) those who received the belt wore it.

Over the last 43 years, over 2,000 Venture and Rover Scouts have gone on Explorer Belt Expeditions. The Explorer Belt was traditionally linked to the Venture Scout Section but since the introduction of ONE Programme, and the standardisation of age ranges the Explorer Belt is now a Rover Scout event and participants must be over the age of 18.

===== Locations =====
In 1982 the Explorer Belt occurred in Vermont, New Hampshire, and New York, United States.

In 1999 the Belt was held in France and included a trip the Disneyland Paris

In 2002 the SAI Explorer Belt was held in Spain, and the CSI belt in Lithuania

In 2005 the Explorer Belt took place in the United States, with the finishing Basecamp at Camp Strang in Connecticut

In 2006 the Explorer Belt took place in Portugal, in 2007 the belt took place in Poland

2008 in Croatia/Slovenia, with the finish point of a town Bled in Slovenia.

In 2009 the Explorer Belt took place in Denmark/Sweden. For what is believed to be the first time, all participants were awarded the Belt. This year also saw the introduction of personal challenges.

In 2010 the Explorer Belt took place in Belgium, Luxembourg and the Netherlands. The finish point was a town called Wiltz in Luxembourg.

In 2011 the Explorer Belt took place in Austria/Czech Republic.

In 2012 the Belt took place from 26 June to 10 July in Brittany, France. This year saw the introduction of SIBs.

In 2013 the Explorer Belt took place in The Basque Country of France and Spain.

In 2014 the Explorer belt took place across Slovakia and Hungary.

In 2015 the Explorer Belt took place in Germany.

In 2016, the Explorer Belt took place in Italy.

In 2017 the Belt return to Poland, and the finish point was Wejherowo. This year was the first in which participants were banned from using phones and social media during the expedition.

In 2018 the Explorer Belt took place in the Netherlands.

In 2019 the Explorer Belt took place in Scandinavia (specifically Sweden and Denmark).

In 2020 the Explorer Belt was cancelled due to the COVID-19 pandemic.

In 2021 the Explorer Belt took place across Ireland. This was the first Explorer Belt hosted in Ireland, due to travel restrictions imposed by the COVID-19 pandemic.

In 2022 the Explorer Belt returned to take place in Portugal.

In 2023 the Explorer Belt took place once again in Germany and Austria.

In 2025 the Explorer Belt took place in Hungary and Slovakia.

The 2026 Explorer Belt took place across Austria and the Czech Republic, from Vienna to Prague.

=== Norway ===
The expedition takes place outside Norway. The expedition goes over 10 days, and is mainly a hike that is at least 200 km.

2001 Kenya

2004 Iceland

2014 Romania

2016 Italy

2018 Andorra, Spain, France

=== Sweden ===
The 3 week expedition is open to senior scouts from 16 to 20 years old.

The main part is walking in pair over at least 160 km during 10 days. They shall then maintain a diary and conduct a number of small projects that promote contact with local people. After the 10 day walk all the pairs gather for other activities, including meeting local scouts.

The Swedish expedition has been held since at least 1963, always in different parts of Europe.

=== Denmark ===
The reward is open to every scout between the age of 18 – 24 years old. Prior to the expedition is two planning weekends, where teams of 2-3 scouts, meet up and plan their route through the foreign country.

The route has to be at least 200 kilometres long. The participants are allowed public transport as long as the hike at least 200 kilometres. While hiking, the participants have to conduct a self-imposed project.

Before the reward is granted, the participants have to make and conduct a presentation of their experiences for their own local scout group.

2019 Ireland

=== United Kingdom ===
The award is open to Explorer Scouts over 16, members of the Scout Network (18–25), and members of Girlguiding UK's Senior Section aged over 16.

Scout groups must have at least three members, but a group with only two members who complete will be eligible for the belt.

In order to achieve the award, the group must spend 10 days in a foreign country and work towards a major project of their choice. They are also asked to complete a further 10 smaller projects - some of their own choice, and some set by the award judges. During this time they must spend at least 50 hours travelling.

The group must complete all plans and organisation for the expedition, and are also asked to take part in a debrief and then provide a presentation.

They do not need to walk during the expedition (alternatives are horse riding, cycling or canoeing and may use public transport. Since the focus is on learning about the country the candidates are visiting, only an average of 5 hours of travelling is required per day.

Explorer Belts are administered on a County level, but are occasionally run on a National level if participants are cross-county.

=== Czech Republic, Slovakia ===
- six international groups of five Rover Scouts

2012 Estonia - Poland

2013 Romania - Cluj-Napoca, with Poland

2014 Ukraine, with Poland, Austria, Hungary

Slovakia re-started their Explorer belt in 2022.

In 2022 the Explorer Belt took place in Poland

=== Portugal ===
In 2015 there was a pilot Explorer Belt with 10 Rover scouts only of one Region, Coimbra, the pioneers of this activity in Portugal. The Explorer Belt in Portugal consisted in two weekends of selection, one of pairing, and other two for preparation, and finally the journey through Slovakia. The Journey took 16 Days, in which 10 were used to explore the country by walking and living other reality through 200 km. It started in Bratislava and ended in Šuňava.

In August 2018, 18 Rovers split in teams of 2, successfully completed the challenge of the 10 days and 200 km, also in Slovakia. It started in Bratislava and ended in Banská Štiavnica.
