= Scouting and Guiding in Ireland =

Scouting and Guiding in Ireland began six months after Baden Powell founded the first Scouts' association near the Isle of Wight, England.

The first Scouting groups in Ireland were founded in Dublin and Dundalk. These were both established near British Army bases which resulted in Catholic boys not joining these groups. A Catholic Scouting group was set up by Tom Farrell, a curate, in 1927.

The first Guiding group was established in Ireland in 1911 in Harold's Cross in Dublin, a year after Powell's sister, Agnes Baden-Powell, founded the first Girl Guides Association.

The Scout and Guide movement in Ireland are now served by a number of groups.

== Scouting ==
- Scouting Ireland, the World Organization of the Scout Movement recognized Scouting association of the Republic of Ireland. They also operate in Northern Ireland
- The Scout Association, recognized Scouting association in the United Kingdom operating only in Northern Ireland
- Baden-Powell Scouts' Association, member of the World Federation of Independent Scouts operating in Northern Ireland

== Guiding ==
- The Council of Irish Guiding Associations, member of the World Association of Girl Guides and Girl Scouts, a federation consisting of:
  - The Catholic Guides of Ireland, an all island association
  - The Irish Girl Guides only serving the Republic of Ireland
- Girlguiding Ulster, a branch of Girlguiding UK operates only in Northern Ireland
