= Chief Scout Award (Scouting Ireland) =

- Owner: Scouting Ireland
Previous; Chief Scout's Award	

The Chief Scout Award is the highest youth programme award in each of the Programme Sections in Scouting Ireland. It is designed to tie-in with the Gaisce Award/Duke of Edinburgh's Award, and the Chief Scout Award for Scouts, Venture Scouts, and Rover Scouts are awarded jointly with the Bronze, Silver and Gold awards respectively. Requirements for the award are a number of Adventure Skills, Special Interest Badges, an Expedition, and camp with an inter-cultural aspect. The progress of the award is led by the participant, with the help of the Scouter.

Chief Scout's Award
- Owner: Scouting Ireland
	Next; Chief Scout Award, part of ONE Programme

A similarly named award, the Chief Scout's Award was the highest award for Scouts in Scouting Ireland until the development of the ONE Programme. A similarly named award was the final step in the personal progressive scheme of the former Scouting Ireland (CSI). Scouting Ireland SAI used it as an award to be achieved in tandem with the progressive badge scheme.

The Chief Scout's Award is an individual recognition of commitment to the Scout Law, dedication to attain personal ambitions and the desire to contribute to and to improve society. Chief Scout's Award holders have often been received at Áras an Uachtaráin by the President of Ireland.

== History of the Chief Scout's Award ==
A Chief Scout's Award was introduced by Catholic Boy Scouts of Ireland in the early 1960s to replace the Silver Palm Award. The first awards were presented by Chief Scout CJ "Kit" Murphy.

Scouting Ireland S.A.I. also awarded a Chief Scout's Award, with successful applicant receiving a cloth badge, a certificate signed by the Chief Scout, and a special neckerchief on Founder's Day in the Mansion House, Dublin.

== Requirements ==
Requirements for the award are a number of Adventure Skills, Special Interest Badges, an Expedition, and camp with an inter-cultural aspect. The progress of the award is led by the participant, with the help of the Scouter. Rover Scouts are presented with their Chief Scout Award/Gold President's Award/Gold DOE Award in an annual ceremony
