= Venture Scouts (Scouting Ireland) =

Programme for Scouts aged 15 to 17

- Owner: Scouting Ireland
- Age range: 15-17
- Country: Republic of Ireland and Northern Ireland
Previous; Scouts	Next; Rover Scouts
- Website http://www.scouts.ie/venture_scouts/what_we_do-31.html

Venture Scouts in Scouting Ireland are aged between 15 and 17 years of age. The awards scheme of Venture Scouts is called Rogha, an Irish word meaning Choice. Although many groups use Gaisce, the President's Award, as part of their programme also. Each group has a Venture Scout Executive which, under the guidance of an adult Scouter, designs and implements activities.

A National Venture Forum Committee (NVFC) represents Venture Scouts on national administrative bodies - in line with the association's Youth Participation Policy. The NVFC meet to discuss matters of importance to Venture Scouts, and a nine-member committee is elected annually at the National Youth Forum which meets at Larch Hill.

== Programme ==
Venture Scouts are scouts aged 15 and a half to 18. They are encouraged to plan, organise and participate in events. Scouters, also known as leaders, only act in an advisory capacity. The Scout method drives the programme. Most Groups meet on a weekly basis, though some meet less frequently. Common activities include hiking, rockclimbing, mountaineering and Scout skills like camping and pioneering. Another common part of the programme is leadership, with Venture Scouts assuming a leadership role in the younger sections of Scouting Ireland. As the range of activities are largely set by the Venture group themselves, programmes vary widely from group to group.

In recent times the number of Venture Scouts has decreased sharply, causing many groups to evaluate their programme in order to make it attractive to young people. It has become common for Scout Counties to form County Venture Groups when it wasn't viable for a Venture Group to exist within an individual Scout Group.

Venture Sea Scouts operate almost exclusively on the sea, especially in areas on the east coast and in Dublin Bay.

== Rogha ==
Rogha (the Irish word for choice) was the Venturer Programme of CSI. It was rewritten in 2003. Rogha is an individual award scheme for Venture Scouts made up of two challenges, Silver and Gold. Upon successful completion of the Silver challenge members are awarded a Silver pin. A Gold pin is awarded for successful completion of the Gold challenge.

There are 5 categories (physical, mental, cultural, social and spiritual) and approximately 50 modules. Each module is in one or more categories (e.g. Art is in Cultural, Social and Mental).

To complete the Silver Challenge, participants must complete one module from each category. They must then complete the focus module with their Scouter. Focus is an evaluation of what participants have done, what participants have learned etc. The gold challenge is similar. After completing the five modules, participants need to complete Focus, as well as Horizons, an evaluation of participants' time in ventures and a look ahead at the future. Each challenge should take a year.

Although not as popular now, Rogha is still used by some groups.

== Explorer Belt ==
The Explorer Belt was the most prestigious award of the Venture Scout Section until the introduction of ONE Programme, at which point the award became a Rover Scout activity.

== Venture Scout Challenge ==
Challenge is an event often referred to as the "Mini-Explorer Belt." Challenge (now in its 20th year) was founded by Brian O'Connor from Cork- today the Spirit of Challenge Trophy is named after him. Like the Belt, it involves teams of two Venture Scouts of the same sex (in recent years different sex teams have also been allowed on the Challenge) walking 100 km in 5 days while living on a budget of 4 euro per person per day in Ireland. The teams get dropped off in a previously unknown location with a map of the area, their budget money, a list of challenges to complete along the route and (in recent years) a mobile phone for checking in each evening. Each participant also has their own Special Interest Badge to complete. This is a challenge that the participant has planned independently, to complete along the route, before the trip. Once back at base camp, the participants also take part in an activity to do with the Adventure Skills Badges. The participants then get assessments at the base camp over 3 days and their assessors decide which standard award the participants are awarded. Successful entrants receive the Challenge woggle, a challenge badge and a certificate of completion for their efforts.

Challenge was originally run (every second year) by SAI. The SI Challenge is run annually. The events were:

- 1987 - West Cork
- 1989 - County Galway
- 1991 - Thurles, County Tipperary
- 1993 - County Kilkenny
- 1995 - County Kerry
- 1997 - County Sligo
- 1999 - West Cork
- 2001 - Isle of Man
- 2003 - County Donegal
- 2004 - County Clare
- 2005 - County Kildare
- 2006 - County Mayo, County Roscommon, County Galway
- 2007 - Ireland, Wales (Postponed until 2008)
- 2009 - Ireland, County Kerry - "Desmond"
- 2010 - Ireland / Wales
- 2011 - Ireland West
- 2012 - The Lake District
- 2015 - West Cork
- 2016 - Northern Ireland
- 2017 - Counties Sligo/Leitrim
- 2018 - Dispersed around Portlick County Westmeath
- 2019 - Counties Tipperary/Waterford/Wexford

== National Venture Scout Triathlon ==
The National Triathlon or Tri-Zone was run for the first time in September 2005. In this physical challenge teams of two people from a Venture Group complete a set course combining rafting, cycling and mountaineering. For example, the 2005 event saw teams rafting on Lough Dan (former national campsite of Scouting Ireland S.A.I.), cycling through Wicklow and hiking to Larch Hill.

== VMOOT ==
The first Irish National Venture Scout Moot (aka VMOOT) took place in Larch Hill from 28 June 2007 to 1 July 2007. The event aims to cover all aspects of the Venture programme.

Communities (teams of 6-8 ventures/senior Scouts) complete a project on the theme of "Citizenship in Motion". The projects reflect active citizenship and "learning by doing". Project topics have included "Graffiti as art", "Discrimination in Ireland" and "Young People and Drugs".

VMoot starts with a midnight campfire on the Thursday night. On Friday morning communities must demonstrate their project. This was followed by "life zones" which included such a diverse mix of activities including pioneering, yoga and archery. On Friday night there was a dance contest (originally intended to be a music festival). On Saturday communities went off site for the "adventures" including caving, surfing and kite making. On Sunday there were several challenges devised by the participants. After the event communities must reflect on what they've learned.

The venue for 2008 was Larch Hill. This event, along with "Vibe" are being replaced by new events called "Unplugged" and "Electric Vents" in 2011.

== Sluaíocht na Sléibhte ==
The Sluaíocht na Sléibhte (SNS) is a weekend mountaineering event for teams of 3 venture Scouts. They are considered as an extension to the Scout mountaineering programme (MPC, Sionnach, PEAK) but with some key changes. The main change is the requirement for adult leader is removed.

Two events are held every year- the winter expedition and the Summer Climb Ax. The first winter SNS was held in 2006 in Lugnaquilla in Wicklow. The 2007 winter SNS went to Mount Snowdon in Wales while the Summer Climb Ax was held in Annascul, Kerry. The winter and summer events in 2008 went to the Mournes and Scotland respectively.

In recent years the SNS has been replaced by Mountain Havoc for Venture Scouts.

== Ventact South Activity Weekend ==
Ventact South is organised by the Joint Committee on Scouting and Guiding in Cork and caters for Venture Scouts, Senior Branch and Ranger Guides from all over Ireland. The event takes place the first weekend in September each year at the Kilcully Scout Centre.

Ventact South is unique as it is Irelands only Joint Event for the Senior Sections of Scouting and Guiding. The event is organized by the Ventact South Sub Committee who are part of the Joint Committee of Scouts and Guides in Cork. The committee is made up of members of Scouting Ireland, Irish Girl Guides and The Catholic Guides of Ireland. The chairperson rotates annually between the three organizations.

Founding members of Ventact South in 1978 were Don Totter (Scout Association of Ireland), Liam Howe (Catholic Boy Scouts of Ireland), Mary Stack (Irish Girl Guides) and Eileen McCarthy (Catholic Guides of Ireland) and the first Ventact took place from the 1st to 3 September.

Participants arrive on the Friday and pitch their tents. There is normally a large campfire followed by Fire Performers. After this tickets for Saturday's activities are given out (followed by a mad dash to swap activities). On Saturday morning participants are bused offsite to do two activities (e.g. Waterskiing, Zipit, Escape Spike Island, Canoeing, Rafting, High Ropes and the Ventact Famous Monopoly Run). When they return, there is a barbecue at the campsite. On Saturday evening there is a Scouts/Guides Own followed by the ever-popular themed Ventact Disco. On Sunday morning there are activities around Kilcully Campsite before everyone heads home.

== Irish Venture Scout Projects ==
- The Phoenix Venture Group from the 9th/10th Dublin (Aughrim Street) Scout Group travelled to Vietnam in Summer 2006 to undertake a development project there. They painted and decorated rooms in the Vung Tau Orphanage, near the southern tip of the country.
- The Donnybrook Venturer Group won the International Youth for Development Prize 2005, nicknamed the "Nobel Prize for Young People" for their development projects in Peru. An international jury led by Jolanta Kwasniewska (First Lady of Poland), Massimo Barra (International Red Cross), Steve Fossett (Adventurer, World Records in 5 sports), Seiko Hashimoto (Member of the Parliament Japan — Triple Olympic Medal holder), Suwit Khunkitti (Minister Thailand), Malik M'Baye (Director of UNESCO), Amaya Gillespie (United Nations Director) voted their projects as overall winner in the Development category. They were commended for their participation in the Youth of the World Campaign and for the project that they had undertaken in the framework of the UN Millennium Development Goals.
- As a joint project, representatives of 3 Dublin Venture Scout Groups (35th Donore Avenue, 127th Drumcondra and 5th Port Dollymount) will be travelling to Kolkata, India in December 2008/January 2009 to work with orphaned street children at the Loreto Sealdah school. Their project will involve both manual work such as building and painting and social work such as providing English language and remedial teaching assistance.

== National Venture Forum Committee/National Venture Scout Representatives ==
Once a year, the National Youth Forum Takes place. The location changes each year. It took place on 14 January 2017 in University College Cork. National Youth Forum 2020 took place on 11 January 2020 in the Ashling Hotel in County Dublin. National Youth Forum 2021 took place online on 14 March 2021 due to Covid-19. National Youth Forum 2022 took place in 1st Kilkenny Scout Den on 2 April 2022 in County Kilkenny.

Six delegates from the scout, venture and rover sections in each county are invited to take part in activities, talks and games. These delegates are elected at a county youth forum. These attendees are also allowed to vote and run for the position of national youth representative. The elected national youth representatives organise and run the next national youth forum.

At the forum, motions regard Venture Scouting are passed and a new group of national youth representatives are elected. The incoming national youth representatives work on these motions and create proposals for the board, outlining how these motions can be implemented. Youth reps also promote youth engagement in programme and project teams.

In the early 2010s, the NVFC had 9 members (6 provincial reps and 3 national panel members). The NVFC represented ventures at the national and provincial levels. They sat on programme teams (NYPC, International, Participation). The NVFC also compiled reports for the Programme Commissioners to advise and guide national Venture Scout initiatives and programmes for the coming year.

Now, there are six national youth representatives per section. Ideally, there should be one for each Scout Province on the island (South, South East, North, North-East, West and Dublin) to allow for equal geographical representation. Now, the national youth representatives are under the Office of the CEO of Scouting Ireland, with a facilitator working as a liaison. Their role is outlined in the terms of reference.

Scouting Ireland also has a strong youth involvement policy. National reps allow for programmes and initiatives to be youth-led.

The national youth representatives played a large role in creating the Youth Charter of Scouting Ireland.
