= Merit badge (disambiguation) =

Merit badge may refer to:

- Merit badge, for the Boy Scouts of America
- Personal progression in Scouting Ireland#Merit badges

== See also ==
- Military awards and decorations
- Scout badge
