= Beaver Scouts (Scouting Ireland) =

- Owner: Scouting Ireland
- Age range: 6–8
- Headquarters: National Office
- Location: Larch Hill, Dublin 16
- Country: Republic of Ireland and Northern Ireland
- Chief Scout: Christy McCann
- Affiliation: World Scout Movement
	Next; Cub Scouts
- Website www.scouts.ie/Beaver-Scout/

Beaver Scouts (commonly known as Beavers) are the youngest age group in Scouting Ireland, being boys and girls aged between 6 and 8 years of age. The personal progressive scheme is broken down into three stages 'Bree' (Year 1) 'Ruarc' (Year 2) and 'Conn', while Adventure skills, Special Interest Badges and the Chief Scout Award also form part of the progress scheme.

== Structure ==
A group of Beavers is called a Beaver Scout Colony. The colony is run by a team of Programme Scouters (often with a "Section Scouter" as the head). The beaver colony operates the lodge system, in accordance with the Scout method, whereby Beavers are divided into small groups called lodges. The head beaver in a lodge is known as a lodge leader who is helped by an assistant lodge leader; these positions are changed frequently within the lodge. The lodge system provides age-appropriate leadership opportunities for beaver scouts.
