= CIGA =

CIGA may refer to:

- Cavity Insulation Guarantee Agency UK provider of guarantee and operator of certification scheme for cavity wall insulation
- Compagnia Italiana Grandi Alberghi, a defunct hotel company purchased by ITT Sheraton in 1994
- Council of Irish Guiding Associations, national Guiding federation of the Republic of Ireland
