= Ógra Chorcaí =

- Formation: 1966
- Type: Youth organization
- Legal status: Non-profit
- Purpose: To engage young people in developmental and educational opportunities in order that they may more fully participate in their community and society.
- Headquarters: Heron House, Blackpool
- Location: Cork, Ireland
- Region served: Ireland
- Parent organization: National Youth Council of Ireland
- Website: Official Site

Ógra Chorcaí (Irish pronunciation: [ˈoːɡɾˠə ˈxɔɾˠkiː]) is a youth organisation in County Cork, Ireland and is affiliated with, and part funded by, the National Youth Council of Ireland.

The primary aim of Ógra Chorcaí is to actively work with young people of the community regarding development and educational opportunities and awareness on social issues in order that they participate and positively in their community and society.

The organisation operates under the structure of a limited company with a board of directors. It collaborates with the Irish Department of Education and Science, Department of Justice, Youth Affairs Section, Garda Síochána, City of Cork V.E.C., Cork County V.E.C., Cork Corporation, Youth Peoples Facilities & Services Fund, Local Drugs Task Force, Early School Leavers Initiatives, FÁS, and other voluntary, non-profit organisations and charities.

Ógra Chorcaí works with and for Young People in three ways:

- Through Adult Volunteers and Leaders
- Through Community based special intervention projects
- Training for prospective youth workers – as a placement agency for National University of Ireland, Maynooth, University College Cork, Cork Institute of Technology, Waterford Institute of Technology and Community Gardaí.

== See also ==
- Education in Ireland
- Youth club
- Youth organisations
