= Enable Ireland =

Irish charity

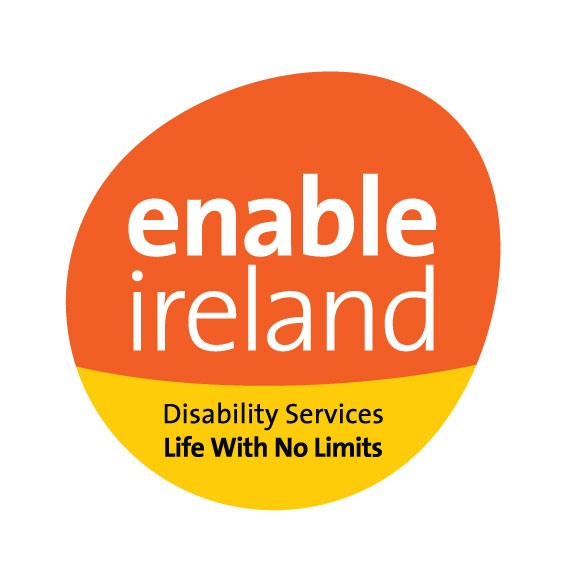
- The current logo, in use since 2015
- Formation: July 14, 1951
- Founder: Dr. Robert Collis
- Type: Charitable organisation
- Legal status: Non-profit
- Purpose: To work in partnership with people with disabilities to achieve "independence, choice and inclusion in their communities."
- Location: Dublin
- Region served: Ireland
- Website: Official Site

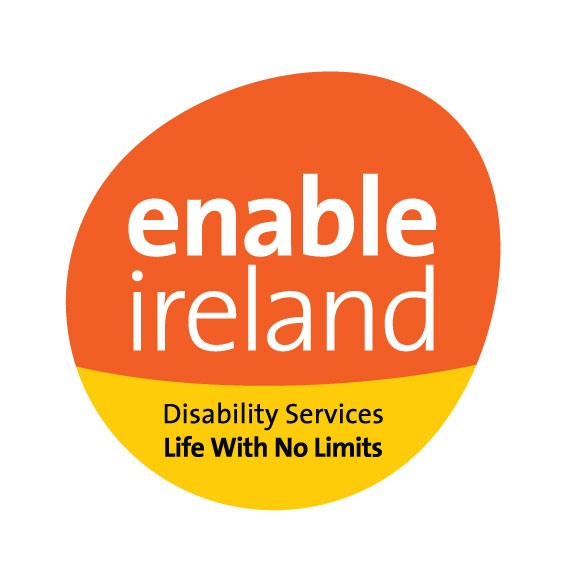
Enable Ireland Company Logo

Enable Ireland is a non-profit state-funded organisation that provides free services to children and adults with disabilities and their families in Ireland. The core of its funding comes from the HSE, Ireland's public health system.

In 2025, Enable Ireland has 30 charity shops throughout the country.

== Background ==
Enable Ireland was founded in 1948 originally as Cerebral Palsy Ireland. Its founder, Dr Robert Collis, used a £100 donation from the Marrowbone Fund to establish an assessment clinic for children with disabilities. Initially, assessment and treatment services were provided on a voluntary basis.

The National Association of Cerebral Palsy was then established in 1951 and worked in conjunction with the Irish government, mostly through County Councils, Regional Health Boards and the Department of Education, in order to provide a range of services for children with physical disabilities and their families. In the 1980s a branch network was created by families throughout Ireland to meet the need for assessment and treatment. These volunteers carried out roles as advocates and fundraisers which contributed to the growth of Enable Ireland and its notability.

By the 1980s, Enable Ireland had also established an innovative fundraising strategy. A retail chain was founded to supplement the running costs and build a capital fund to boost State provisions. The profits generated have enhanced Enable Ireland's capacity to work in partnership with the State in the expansion of services and facilities.

== Guinness world record ==
A new world record in the Guinness Book of Records was broken in Nenagh in County Tipperary on the 18 December 2011 when 936 people gathered dressed as elves.

The record it originally broke was set in New York City on the 7 December 2009, when just over 600 elves gathered in one place.

The event was organised by the local council and was aimed at raising over €40,000 for Enable Ireland.

== See also ==
- Charity
- Disability
- Disability studies
- Health Service Executive
- National Youth Council of Ireland
- Special education
