= Tri-Zone =

The National Triathlon or Tri-Zone is a Venture Scouts event first run in September 2005. Teams of two people from a Venture Group complete a set course combining rafting, cycling and mountaineering.

== Teams ==
Each team consists of two ventures, who must be registered as Venture Scouts in the National Office. Mixed teams are allowed, as long as two separate tents are provided for the team.

== Equipment ==
The equipment that is brought is arguably the most important aspect for any team. The recommended items to bring are:

- Food and cooking facilities (i.e. trangia)
- Tent(s)
- Hiking Boots
- Raingear
- The participant's own bike
- Runners for rafting (these will get wet) and runners for cycling
- Sleeping bag, spare clothes etc...
- First aid kit

== See also ==
- Scouting Ireland
- Triathlon
- Ventures
