= Scouts (Scouting Ireland) =

- Owner: Scouting Ireland
- Age range: 12-15
- Country: Republic of Ireland and Northern Ireland
Previous; Cub Scouts	Next; Venture Scouts
- Website www.scouts.ie/what-we-do/scouts

Scouts in Scouting Ireland are aged between 11 and a half to 16 years of age. Each group has a Court of Honour/Patrol Leader's Council which under the guidance of an adult Scouter designs and implements activities. Scouts is the section where activities begin to really challenge the youth member and impart responsibility and self-reliance in accordance with the Scout method and the educational philosophy of Baden-Powell. The organisation also currently has Sea Scout and Air Scout programmes. The highest award is the Chief Scout Award.

== Crean awards ==
As part of ONE programme, the award scheme in the Scout section mirrors that in other sections, with its specific symbolic framework. Polar explorer Tom Crean is the inspiration for the Crean Awards badge scheme. There are 4 badges, named after Crean's expeditions (Discovery, Terra Nova, Endurance and Polar), with each needing about a year to complete.

The first badge Discovery, doubles as a requirement for investiture into the section.

The Chief Scout Award is also available to obtain for Scouts in their final year in the section. Adventure skills and Special Interest badges are a requirement of this award.

== Troop structure ==
Scouts are divided up in patrols and troops.

6-8 Scouts make up a patrol. The patrol is the main unit of the Scout programme and most activities are done in the patrol. The patrol is led by an older Scout known as a patrol leader (PL). They are helped by an assistant patrol leader (APL). All other members of the patrol are given jobs (e.g. cook, first aider, scribe). The patrol system encourages teamwork and youth leadership.

A standard troop is made up of 20-32 Scouts (divided into 3-4 patrols) under the leadership of a group of Adult Scouters. The PLs come together in a Patrol Leaders Council/Court of Honour to help the Scouters run the troop.

The highlight of the Scouting year is the troop annual camp which usually takes place at summer time, either within Ireland or Internationally.

== Phoenix Patrol Challenge ==
The Phoenix Trophy

The Phoenix Patrol Challenge is the national Scoutcraft competition. It is organised by the National Events Team. To reach the 4-day event, patrols of 8 members qualify from their respective Scout Counties through qualifying county-level events, often known as a Shield or Cup.

Patrols combine traditional Scout skills with team games. Tasks vary from year to year, with pioneering, water activities, hiking, bivouacking and crafts. There are separate prizes for campcraft, cooking, logbook, health and safety, activity bases and special projects and the overall winners' prize.

The Phoenix evolved from the Melvin competition of Scouting Ireland (CSI) and the Smythe Cup of Scouting Ireland (SAI). The name "Phoenix" was chosen for its symbolic meaning by the National Patrol Leaders' Forum in August 2004.

The first official Phoenix Challenge was run in 2005 in Pallaskenry, County Limerick. Although, the National Patrol Challenge was held in Larch Hill in August 2004. Each Phoenix is themed and all of the activities relate to the theme.

=== Winners ===
- 2004 - Larch Hill - 34th Limerick (Pallaskenry)
- 2005 - Pallaskenry - A Journey Through Science - 17th/20th Waterford (St. Pauls)
- 2006 - Tollymore - The Medival Experience - 34th Limerick (Pallaskenry)
- 2007 - Curragh - Flight of the Phoenix - 17th/20th Waterford (St. Pauls)
- 2008 - Larch Hill & Lough Dan - 1908: The Beginning - Gold Recipients: 91st Dublin (Bluebell), 11th Belfast (St. Colmcille's), 7th Waterford (De La Salle), 18th/19th Cork (Fermoy), 17th/20th Waterford (St. Pauls), 3rd Cork (St Patrick's)
- 2009 - Mount Melleray & Glenshellane - Survivor - 7th Waterford (De La Salle)
- 2010 - Larch Hill & Lough Dan - The Big Bang - 17th/20th Waterford (St. Pauls)
- 2011 - Pallaskenry & Curragh Chase - The Era of Adventure - 17th/20th Waterford (St. Pauls)
- 2012 - Larch Hill - The Olympics - 17th/20th Waterford (St. Pauls)
- 2013 - Castle Saunderson- Messengers of Peace - 7th Waterford (De La Salle)
- 2014 - Mount Melleray & Waterford City - Party: 1100 Years of Waterford City - 18/26th Waterford (Ferrybank)
- 2015 - Pallaskenry - Into the Galactic Wilderness - 3rd/4th/6th Louth (St. Oliver's)
- 2016 - Mount Melleary - Age of Discovery - 80th Cork (Little Island)
- 2017 - Stormont - Eureka - 18/26th Waterford (Ferrybank)
- 2018 - Pallaskenry - The Celts - 2nd Cork (Ballyphehane)
- 2019 - Cork Showgrounds - The Day After Tomorrow - 3rd/4th/6th Louth (St. Oliver's)
- 2020/2021 - (There were no competitions in 2020 and 2021 due to the COVID-19 pandemic)
- 2022 - Pallaskenry - One Small Step - 13th Wexford (Clonard)
- 2023 - Larch Hill - It’s Christmas! - 91st Dublin (Bluebell)
- 2024 - Cork Showgrounds - Once Upon a Time - 91st Dublin (Bluebell)
- 2025 - Pallaskenry - 20 in ‘25 - 94th Dublin (Walkinstown)
- 2026 - Castle Saunderson - Tom Crean & the Lost Journal - 94th Dublin (Walkinstown)

== Mountaineering events ==
Scouting Ireland has 3 mountaineering events- the Mountain Pursuit Challenge, Sionnach Adventure and PEAK.

The Mountain Pursuit Challenges (MPCs) are a series of weekend events for teams of 4 Scouts aged 13–16 with a leader. There are four events — Munster, Leinster, Connaught and Ulster. There is also the locally organised County Expedition and County Pursuit Challenge which are aimed towards younger Scouts.

The Sionnach Adventures were originally run by SAI. There are 3 events run each year.

Patrol Expedition Adventure Kamp (PEAK) is a week-long training adventure for Scouts aged 14–16 run over Easter week in Caponalea Outdoor Education Centre is Kerry. Scouts learn hiking and teamwork skills.

== Air Scouting events ==
"Air" is one of the nine adventure skills under the One Programme, and the main national event is the "Iolar Challenge" which takes place in Ballyboughal Airfield in late August each year. The weekend provides an opportunity for Scouts and ventures to camp on an active airfield for the weekend and participate in aviation themed programme provided by a mix of Scouters and external industry experts.

== National Scout Forum ==
The National Scout Forum represents Scouts on all national administrative bodies in line with the organisation's 'Youth Charter'. These people are known as National Youth Representatives. The six member committee is elected annually at the National Youth Forum and meets regularly to discuss matters of importance to Scouts nationwide. They represent the Scout section at National Events and meetings, and discuss the concerns and suggestions of youth members nationwide.

One is elected from each of Scouting Ireland's six scout provinces. Each member has a role, including a chairperson, responsible for organising meetings of the National Scout Representatives, and a secretary, responsible for keeping notes of all meetings and communicating with other groups on behalf of the National Scout Representatives.

One of the primary roles of the six member team is to present the successful motions of the National Scout Forum to the company's General Meetings.
