= Council of Irish Guiding Associations =

Federation of girl guide bodies in Ireland

- Comhairle Bantreoraithe na hÉireann
- Headquarters: Unit 2, The Square Industrial Complex, Belgard Square East, Tallaght, Dublin D24 FEX5
- Country: Ireland
- Founded: 1992
- Membership: 13,837
- Affiliation: World Association of Girl Guides and Girl Scouts

The Council of Irish Guiding Associations (Irish: Comhairle Bantreoraithe na hÉireann) is the national Guiding federation of the Republic of Ireland. Guiding in Ireland started in 1911, and Ireland became a member of the World Association of Girl Guides and Girl Scouts (WAGGGS) in 1932. The council serves 13,837 Guides (as of 2008).

== History ==
The Irish Girl Guides (GGI) became a member of WAGGGS in 1932. About the same time, the first independent companies of Catholic Guides were founded in Ireland. When the diocese based Catholic Guide organizations formed the federation of the Catholic Girl Guides of Ireland (CGI) in 1972, the new organization expressed the wish of joining WAGGGS. After nearly twenty years of negotiations, both organizations agreed to establish the Council of Irish Guiding Associations in 1992. The Council was recognised as a full member of WAGGGS in July 1993 during the 28th WAGGGS World Conference as continuing the membership gained by the Irish Girl Guides in 1932.

Since WAGGGS accepts only one member organization per country, members of CGI living in Northern Ireland were not members of WAGGGS until 2008 when an agreement was signed by CGI and Girlguiding UK on the representation of CGI members resident in Northern Ireland.

== Aims ==
The aims of CIGA are to

1. enable membership of WAGGGS to be held by the Irish Girl Guides and the Catholic Guides of Ireland on behalf of their members resident in the Republic of Ireland;
2. promote and further the objects of the World Association as expressed in Article 111 of the Constitution and Bye-Laws of WAGGGS;
3. encourage strong dialogue and close cooperation amongst the family of Guiding in the whole of Ireland;
4. facilitate participation at international events and activities
5. work towards a single movement.

== Structures ==
The organisation is overseen by a committee, with four members each from the Irish Girl Guides and the Catholic Guides of Ireland; the committee's chairmanship rotates biennially between the two organizations. Additionally, there are four observers representing Guiding in Northern Ireland, two from CGI and two from Girlguiding Ulster.

== See also ==
- Scouting Ireland
