= Foróige =

Irish youth community organisation

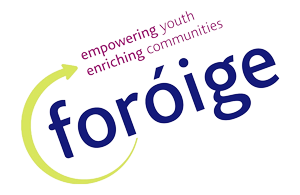
- The current logo, in use since 2013
- Formation: 14 March 1952; 74 years ago
- Founded at: Dublin, Ireland
- Type: Youth organisation
- Registration no.: 552248
- Purpose: To involve young people in their own development and in the development of society
- Headquarters: Foróige, Joyce Way, Park West; D12 Y0A6
- Location: Dublin
- Coordinates: 53°19′49.4″N 6°22′24.874″W
- Staff: 348 (2015)
- Volunteers: 5,500 (2015)
- Website: www.foroige.ie
- Formerly called: Macra na Tuaithe

Foróige is an Irish organisation whose purpose is "to enable young people to involve themselves consciously and actively in their development and in the development of society". Macra na Tuaithe, the youth branch of Macra na Feirme, was formed on 14 March 1952. In 1981, the organisation changed its name to Foróige, derived from forbairt na hóige, which means "development of youth".

== History ==
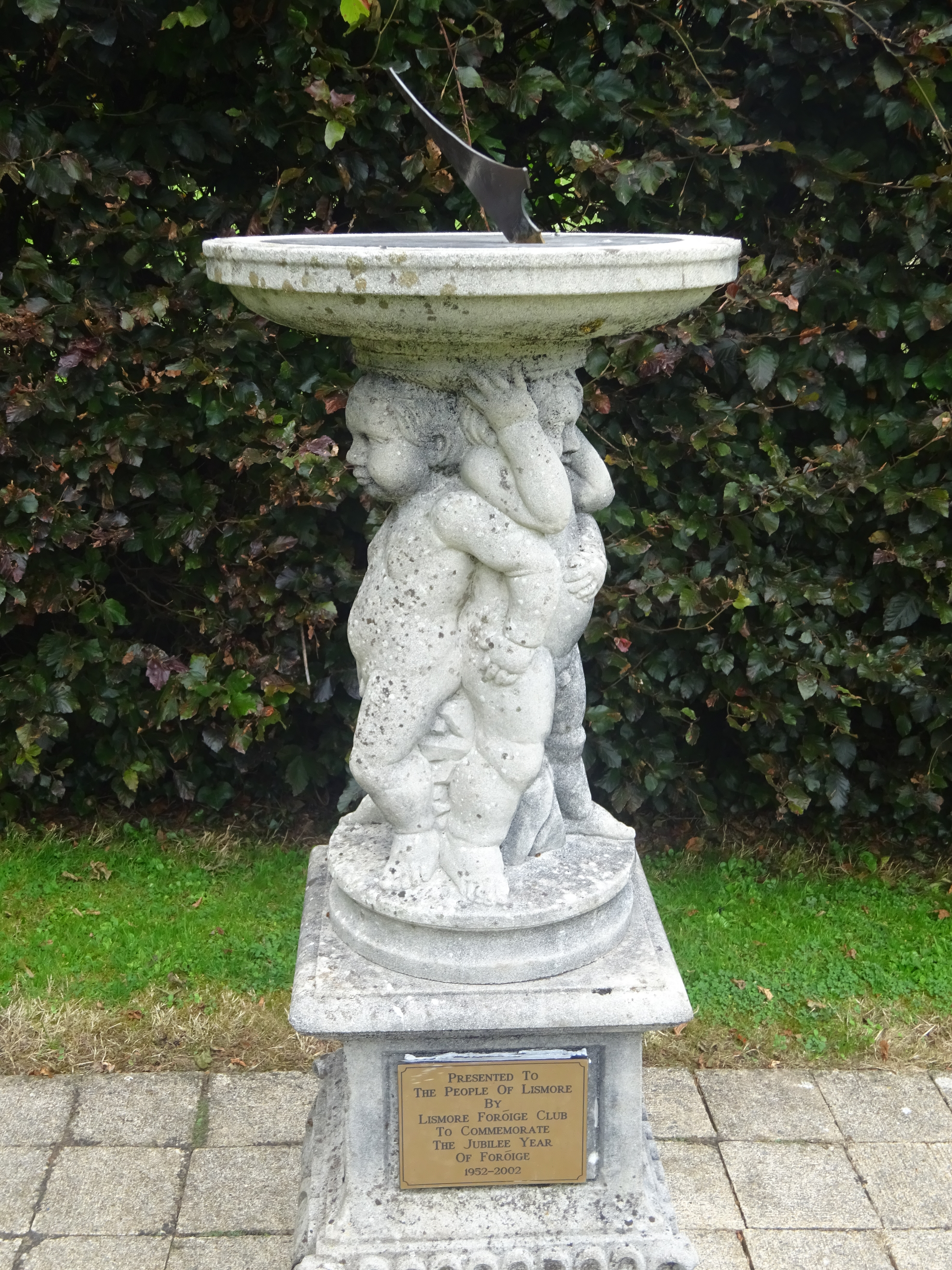
Sundial in Lismore, County Waterford marking the 50th anniversary of Foróige, erected in 2002.

=== The first club ===
The first club was formed in the town of Mooncoin, County Kilkenny on 14 March 1952 where the local school held a youth club for the schoolchildren. As this was a success, another 12 pilot clubs came together and in 1953, Macra na Tuaithe was created.

=== Funding and grants ===
In 1958, the W.K. Kellogg Foundation in America secured a £30,000 grant to help fund an expansion of Macra na Tuaithe activities. In 1963, the organisation received its first funding from the Department of Education.

=== Expansion and name change ===
In 1971, Macra na Tuaithe began its expansion into urban areas with the opening of a permanent headquarters in Dublin, and developed the decision to build more Foróige clubs in urban areas. The first national conference for the organisation's volunteers took place in Termonfeckin, County Louth and this still continues today. In 1981, Marca na Tuaithe was renamed Foróige and the result of this change was to facilitate further expansion into growing urban areas.

=== Change of governance ===
In 2015, Foróige changed its governance from an association into a company limited by guarantee. This change enhanced the role the volunteers play in the organisation.
