= Scout badge =

Badge worn by scouts

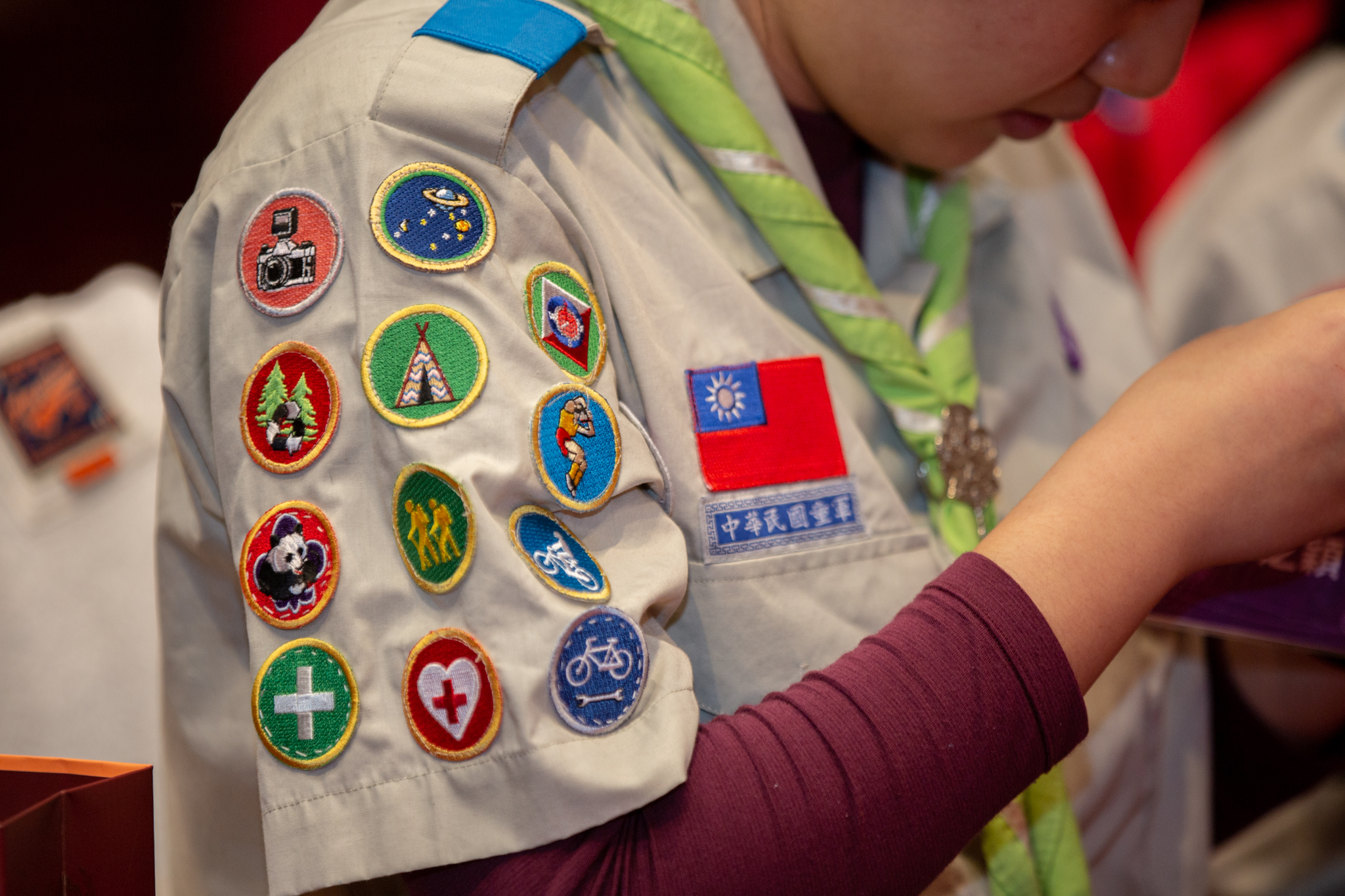
A collection of Scout badges, attached to a shirt sleeve

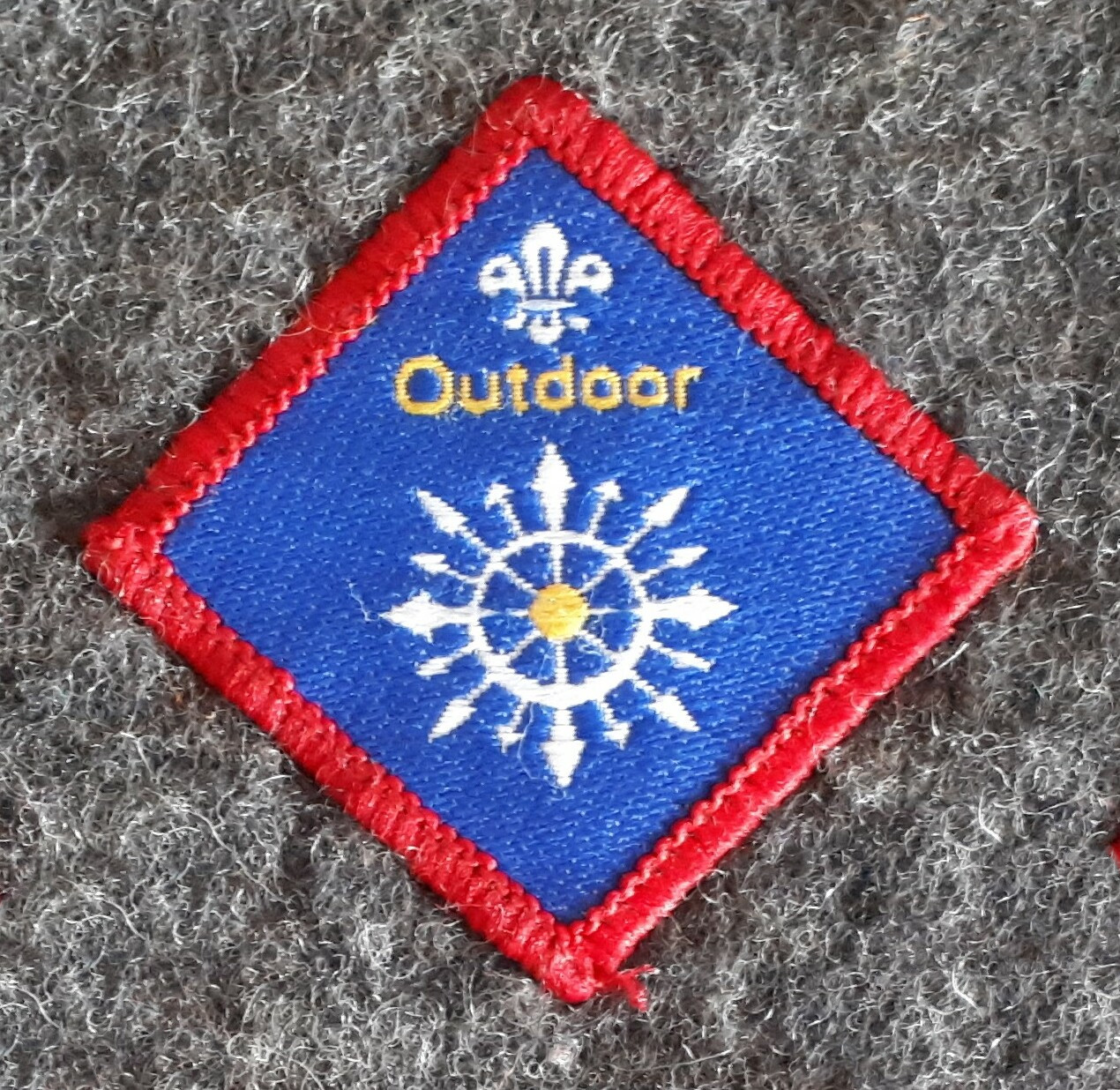
The "Outdoor" badge from The Scout Association in the United Kingdom

Scout badges are worn on the uniforms of members of Scouting organisations across the world in order to signify membership and achievements. There is a great variety of badges, not only between the different national Scouting organisations, but within the programme sections, as well.

== Background ==
Almost all badges are now made from cloth and are sewn onto the uniform shirt. In Scouting America, the badges are commonly found on a sash. In general, there are four types of badges worn by members of Scouting

- Group identity - Scouts belong to sub-divisions within their national organisations, and wear badges which identify which Scout Groups, Scout Districts, Scout Councils, or other divisions;
- Progressive awards - each section of Scouting has a number of long-term award programmes which reward the core principles of Scoutcraft, service, and adventure
- Activity or proficiency awards - Scouts are able to undertake a large number of activities and, on completion of set criteria, are awarded recognition for these activities
- Special/event badges - from time to time, Scouts are able to wear special event badges, for example, to celebrate the Scouting 2007 Centenary

== See also ==
- List of highest awards in Scouting
- Wood Badge
- Merit badge
- Scouting memorabilia collecting
