= Rover Scouts (Scouting Ireland) =

Scouting organization in Ireland

- Owner: Scouting Ireland
- Age range: 18-26
- Headquarters: National Office
- Location: Larch Hill, Dublin 16
- Country: Republic of Ireland and Northern Ireland
- Affiliation: World Scout Movement
Previous; Venture Scouts	
- Website http://www.scouts.ie/rover_scouts/what_we_do-41.html

Rover Scouts in Scouting Ireland are aged between 18 and 26 years of age. It is a new section and is being set up in many universities around the country. The main activity done in the Rover Section is the Explorer Belt but there are a number of other activities that Rover Scouts are involved in, such as International Service Projects.

== Explorer Belt ==
The Explorer Belt was traditionally linked to the Venture Scout Section, but since the introduction of ONE Programme the Explorer Belt is now done by Rover Scouts. Rover Scouts, in teams of two, walk a distance of at least 200 km in 10 days completing tasks along the way. These tasks include maintaining a log of the journey, consisting of a daily route, menu, budget and account of the day's activities. Each team must also complete a number of challenges, both Prescribed and Personal which encourage the participants to engage with the local populace and to learn about the local culture. Each team must find its own way back to a base camp where the expedition leaders are waiting for them. Teams are dropped off in an unknown location with just a map, the location of base camp and a small amount of money on which to survive. The aim of the event is to test skills of communication, physical endurance and teamwork. Complete immersion in a foreign culture necessitates an ability to adapt to the norms of a different society with different customs and values, usually also a different language.

The Explorer Belt award is shared by other scout and guide associations.
