= Cub Scouts (Scouting Ireland) =

Youth section of Scouting Ireland

- Team Lead/PC
- Owner: Scouting Ireland
- Age range: 9–11
- Headquarters: Larch hill, Dublin
- Country: Republic of Ireland and Northern Ireland
- Founded: 1976
- Affiliation: World Scout Movement
Previous; Beaver Scouts	Next; Scouts
- Website www.scouts.ie/what-we-do/cub-scouts

Cub Scouts or Macaoimh (Irish pronunciation: [ˈmˠakiːvʲ]) is the name given to youth members Scouting Ireland and previously Scouting Ireland (CSI), of the Cub Scout age group. The terms Macaoimh and Cub are often co-existent though Macaoimh represents a different tradition. Both boys and girls participate in the Cub Scout programme though some Scout Groups are boys only. Its membership is the largest of the four Scouting Ireland Sections. The Cub Scout programme is part of the worldwide Scouting movement and aims to develop the youth member using the SPICE program - Social, Physical, Intellectual, Character, Emotional and Spiritual.

== Methodology ==
The Cub Scout programme is designed to provide adventure, fun and exploration, and to teach responsibility. Cub Scouts are organised into Packs, and then into groups, usually of 6 members, called Sixes. Each Six has one of the Cub Scouts as their leader, a "Sixer," and an assistant leader, a "Seconder". The Sixers meet in a Sixer Council, and talk about things that the Cub Scouts would like to do. Cub Scouts are given more responsibility and more say in the running of the programme and as a result can do more than Beavers. They spend more time working in small groups and making decisions as a team, with every Cub Scout having a job to do in the Six, and gaining additional responsibility as they develop.

Getting out into nature is a focus of Cub Scouting. Cub Scouts gather from time to time on camping events - JamÓige events, big camps for Cub Scouts, with perhaps 2000 Cub Scouts camping together, National Cub Scouting days, National Cub Challenge as well as Pack Holidays.

== Personal Progression ==
The personal progressive scheme takes the form of badges which use a certain number of stages to determine how far along in the programme the Cub Scout is. The three stages are Turas (bronze needle), Taisteal (silver needle) and Tagann (gold needle).

The Aim of Scouting is to develop young people Socially, Physically, Intellectually, Character, Emotionally, Spiritually. These elements are called the SPICES and are deeply integrated into the programme experience via the Scout Method, Personal Progress Awards and Programme designed by young people.

The Programme, that the young people have designed with the help and assistance of Scouters follows a simple process; PLAN, DO, REVIEW. Programmes are planned, activities executed, and the whole process is reviewed. The review process is important as it allows young people to learn by doing, reflect on their new knowledge, and carry it through to the next Programme step. This allows them to see their own progress, and move towards future discoveries and experiences. Along with the Progress badges that a young person gets from following their personal journey in Scouting they also have the opportunity of doing complementary badges; Adventure Skills, Special Interest Badges and Nautical badges.

Adventure Skills Badges require a young person to achieve a detailed set standard in a particular Adventure Skill. The requirements are progressive, and ultimately pave the way to outside recognition by a governing body of a chosen skill. There are currently nine Adventure Skills Badges.

Special interest badges are open-ended badges that reflect the interests of the young person undertaking them. Any subject is possible. The requirements are designed by the young person in consultation and agreement with their Scouters. Badge requirements are designed to allow exploration of the subject, develop and improve skills, and put the new knowledge into practice, preferably as a practical project which will benefit others.

== Leadership ==
Scouting Ireland's National Team Lead for Cub Scouts is Eoghan Halvey. The role of the Scouter is one of assisting, supporting, facilitating and motivating. The Scouter is a role model, rather than a boss. Younger age ranges will require more facilitation and direction but this should be reversed in older age ranges to one of ‘mentor or coach’. The Scouter needs to be aware of the young people in their Section, and understand ‘where they are’ in relation to their development as young people. Scouters will assist in reviewing activities and help young people to reflect on their experiences and personal journey through Scouting.

== The National Cub Challenge ==
The National Cub Challenge is the national competition for Sixes. Sixes qualify from their respective Scout Counties to reach the 2/3 day event. Patrols combine traditional Scouting skills, including camping and cooking, with team games. Tasks vary from year to year, with pioneering, water activities, and crafts.
