= Young Irish Film Makers =

- Location: Ireland
- Website: yifm.com

Young Irish Film Makers (YIFM) is a film training and production company set up in 1991 to help young people aged 13 to 20 make digital feature films.

In 1998 they produced their first feature Under the Hawthorn Tree for Channel 4 and RTÉ.

In 2002 YIFM set up the National Youth Film School to allow young people from all over Ireland and abroad to spend five weeks shooting a major feature film for television. Two films produced under the National Youth Film School, The Children (2002) and Stealaway (2005), have won awards at the Moondance International Film Festival.

== Filmography ==
- Under the Hawthorn Tree (1998)-Directed by Siobhan Lyons & Bronagh Murphy (TV)
- D'Boyz (2001)-Directed by Mike Kelly
- Skegs & Skangers (2002)-Directed by John Morton
- The Children (2002)-Directed by Mark Gillespie & Mike Kelly
- Stealaway (2005)-Directed by Mike Kelly
- Lily's Bad Day (2006)-Directed by Trev Anderson
- Eliza Mayflower (2007)-Directed by Trev Anderson
- Suckers (2007)-Directed by John Doran & Chris Slack
- The Suitors (2009)-Directed by Stephen Colfer
- Attic (2009; short film)-Directed by Peter Mooney
- The Secret of Kells (2009)-Directed by Tomm Moore & Nora Twomey
- Viral (2010) - Directed by Fergal Costello
- The Usurpers (2011)-Directed by Mike Kelly
- The H Factor (2010) (Short Film)
- Red and Green (2010) (Short Film)
- Future History (2010) (Short Film)
- Speed Getaway (2010) (Short Film)
- Dublin Zoo 2 (2010) (Short Film)
- The Cubicle (2010) (Short Film)
- First Confession (2011) (Short Film)-Mike Kelly
- Goldman's Mind (2014) (Short Film)
- Aura (2015) (Short Film)
- Tables Turned (2016)
- Leaves (2016) (Contemporary Music Video)
- My Heart Will Go On (2016) (Music Video)
- BraceFace (2016) (Short Film)
- Thick as Thieves (2017) (Short Film)-Directed by Alan Doyle & Rachel McGill
- Murder He Wrote (2017) (Short Film)
- My Father's Dragon (2022 film)-Directed by Nora Twomey
- The Feud (2025) (Short Film)-Directed by Jonty Ross
- Dead Man’s Best Friend (2025) (Short Film)-Directed by Leo Thompson
- Humours of Tea (2025, Short Film)-Directed by Amy Woodger
