= Gaisce – The President's Award =

Irish youth award

Gaisce - The President's Award
- Founded: 28 March 1985
- Type: Youth award scheme
- Location: Ratra House, Phoenix Park, Dublin, Ireland
- Region served: Ireland
- Website: www.gaisce.ie

Gaisce – The President's Award (Irish: Gaisce – Gradam an Uachtaráin) is an award in Ireland, earned by young people between the ages of 14 and 25 for participating in several activities for a certain period. There are three awards: bronze, silver and gold.

The term "gaisce" is from the Irish language and can be translated as "achievement". The award was established by a trust deed under the patronage of the President of Ireland on 28 March 1985. In 1988 the award became part of the Duke of Edinburgh's International Award Association. The profile of the award was raised substantially following the first award ceremonies performed by President Hillery in 1989.

== Overview ==
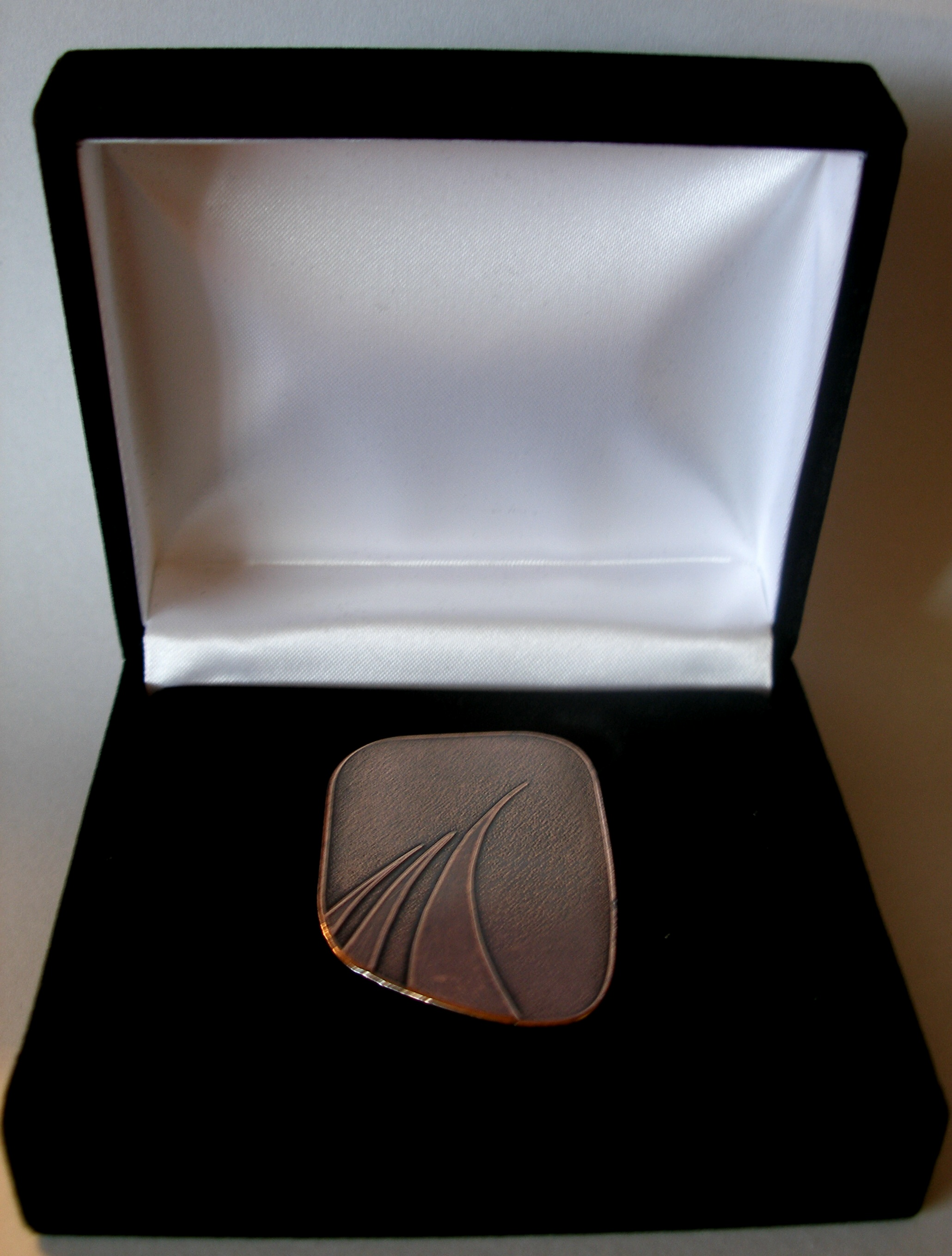
Gaisce Award

Gaisce's mission is to contribute to the development of all young people through the achievement of personal challenges. The process is non-competitive, meaning that all participants who complete their challenges may receive the Gaisce. Awards can be entered directly (without a previous award) or indirectly (from a previous award). The award is presented at a regional ceremony by either a famous person (bronze/silver) or the President of Ireland (gold).

There are four challenges in each award, which all must be completed outside of school activities (except ECDL):

- Community Involvement – Charity work, Help with a youth club, Green Schools, Tidy Towns, Helping with children
- Personal Skill – ECDL, Musical instrument, Dance, Singing lessons, Web design, Learn a foreign language (No sport allowed)
- Physical Recreation – Walking, Cycling, Tennis, Badminton, Golf, Soccer, Gaelic, Rugby, Swimming, A marathon
- Adventure Journey/Research – Adventure center, European walk/cycle, Mountain hike, Canoeing, (Those who would be unable to accomplish this due to a physical disability perform a suitable replacement activity such as research)

or

- Residential Project (Gold only) – Volunteering in a foreign/3rd world country, Attend a sports coaching, Irish language course

Every participant has the support of a President's Award Leader (PAL) who guides them through the challenges and sets appropriate activities.

=== Bronze ===
Participants must be at least age 15 to enter. A minimum of one hour a week is required. There are five sections to complete;

- Community Involvement – 13 weeks
- Personal Skill – 13 weeks
- Physical Recreation – 13 weeks
- Additional activity in any section of your choice from the three above – 13 weeks
- Adventure Journey/Research – Plan prepare and undertake a 2-day, 1 night adventure journey in a group covering a minimum total distance of: Walking 25–35 km or Cycling 100–130 km over two consecutive days.

=== Silver ===
Participants must be at least age 16 to enter. A minimum of one hour a week is required. There are five sections to complete if entering directly to the silver award with no previous Bronze Gaisce award, four if entered from with a Bronze award already received;

- Community Involvement – 26 weeks
- Personal Skill – 26 weeks
- Physical Recreation – 26 weeks
- Additional activity in any section of your choice from the three above – 26 weeks (not required if the participant has received the Bronze award)
- Adventure Journey/Research – Plan prepare and undertake a 3-day, 2 night adventure journey in a group covering a minimum total distance of: Walking 50–79 km or Cycling 190–220 km over 3 consecutive days.

=== Gold ===
Participants must be at least age 17 to enter. A minimum of one hour a week is required. There are five sections to complete if entering directly to the gold award with no previous Silver Gaisce award, four if entered from with a silver award already received;

- Community Involvement – 52 weeks
- Personal Skill – 52 weeks
- Physical Recreation – 52 weeks
- Additional activity in any section of your choice from the three above - 26 weeks (not required if the participant has received the Silver award)
- Adventure Journey/Research – Plan prepare and undertake a 4-day, 3 night adventure journey in a group covering a minimum total distance of: Walking 80–110 km or Cycling 300–350 km over 4 consecutive days.

or

- Residential Project – A shared activity with a group in a residential setting for 5 days and 4 nights.

== Affiliation with Scouting Ireland ==
Gaisce is now closely affiliated with Scouting Ireland. It is integrated into the new 'One Program' for those who are at the qualifying age. Scouting Ireland has an award scheme called the Chief Scout Award which is an award that runs in conjunction with the Gaisce, although it is considered by many to be more difficult. Scout, Venture Scout, and Rover Scout Chief Scout Awards are affiliated with the Bronze, Silver and Gold Gaisce Awards. Through the Chief Scout Award you can in turn earn your Gaisce, but this does not work the other way around; if you have completed your Gaisce you do not receive your Chief Scout Award as well. All leaders who have been invested into Scouting Ireland and who have the appropriate training can take the role of being a PAL, if they so desire.

Also, the award is affiliated with Irish Girl Guiding's Senior Branch, with the separate segments being represented in the Bronze star, Silver moon, and Gold sun badges.

== Summary of requirements ==
=== Bronze Award (15+ years) ===
Service	Skills	Physical Recreation	Expeditions
13 weeks	13 weeks	13 weeks	Plan, prepare for and undertake a 2-day, 1 night venture

All Participants must undertake a further 13 weeks in either the Service, Skills or Physical Recreation.

=== Silver Award (16+ years) ===
Service	Skills / Physical Recreation	Expeditions
6 months	One section for 6 months and the other section for 3 months	Plan, prepare for and undertake a 3-day, 2 night venture

People who do not have the Bronze Award must undertake a further 6 months in either the Service or the longer of the Skills or Physical Recreation Sections.

=== Gold Award (17+ years) ===
Service	Skills / Physical Recreation	Expeditions	Residential
12 months	One section for 12 months and the other section for 6 months	Plan, prepare for and undertake a 4-day, 3 night venture	Undertake a shared activity in a residential setting away from home for 5 days and 4 nights

People who do not have the Silver Award must undertake a further 6 months in either the Service or the longer of the Skills or Physical Recreation Sections.

== Joint Award Initiative ==
In Northern Ireland participants completing the Duke of Edinburgh's Award can choose to accept a certificate from the Gaisce or an International Award Certificate instead of a Duke of Edinburgh certificate.

== See also ==
- Education in the Republic of Ireland
- Duke of Edinburgh's Award
