= Irish Girl Guides =

Organisation in the Republic of Ireland

- Trefoil of the Irish Girl Guides
- Headquarters: Dublin, Ireland
- Country: Ireland
- Founded: 1911
- Founder: The Guide Association
- Membership: 7,520 in 2024
- Chief Commissioner: Aisling Claffey Healion
- International Commissioner: Dara Callanan
- President: Deirdre Henley
- CEO: Lorraine Mackey McHugh
- Affiliation: World Association of Girl Guides and Girl Scouts
- Website http://www.irishgirlguides.ie

The Irish Girl Guides (Irish: Bantreoraithe na hÉireann) is a Girl Guides organisation in the Republic of Ireland. Together with the Catholic Guides of Ireland, it forms the Council of Irish Guiding Associations. Whereas the Catholic Guides are an all-Ireland body, the Irish Girl Guides are not organised in Northern Ireland, where Girlguiding Ulster, the branch of Girlguiding UK, operates instead.

== History ==
As a soldier, the founder of Scouting and Guiding, Robert Baden-Powell, discovered that boys could be trained and used to help in emergencies. He held an experimental camp at Brownsea Island in Dorset in 1907 at which the boys were divided into patrols and trained to be self-reliant.

The first big rally for Scouts was held at Crystal Palace outside London in 1909. At this there were 10,000 boys as well as some girls who dressed in a uniform and called themselves "Girl Scouts".

In 1910, Girl Guides were officially formed with Baden-Powell's sister, Agnes Baden-Powell, in charge. A syllabus for girls was drawn up for their training similar to that for the Scouts.

Only a year after the Girl Guide Movement was founded, the first official company in Ireland was formed, in 1911 in Harold's Cross. Guiding then spread to County Cork and County Wicklow. At this time, there was no border between North and South so Guiding was run as one organisation for all Ireland. In 1921, Ireland was partitioned into the Irish Free State and Northern Ireland, by the Government of Ireland Act (1920), and a separate organisation for the Free State was created, the Irish Free State Girl Guides.

Ireland became a separate member of the World Association of Girl Guides and Girl Scouts (WAGGGS) in 1932.

In 1938, the name of the organisation was changed to the "Irish Girl Guides".

In July 1993, at the 28th World Conference in Denmark, the Council of Irish Guiding Associations was ratified as a full member of WAGGGS. The Council of Irish Guiding Associations consists of the Irish Girl Guides and the Catholic Guides of Ireland on behalf of their members in the Republic of Ireland.

The World Conference was held in Dublin in July 1999. International Guide camps were held in Charleville, County Cork in July 2002, in Tattersalls, County Meath in July 2007, in Lough Key Forest Park, County Roscommon in 2012, in Rockwell College, County Tipperary in 2017, and in Clongowes Wood College, County Kildare in 2025. The latter, which took place between 3 and 9 August 2025, had over 1,500 participants.

The honorary ambassador for 2023 was the journalist Sheila Naughton.

== Age groups ==
The Irish Girl Guides has four different age brackets:

- Ladybirds are girls aged 5–7
- Brownies are girls aged 7–10
- Guides are girls aged 10–14
- Senior Branch are girls aged 14–30

Leaders of these groups are aged of 18 onwards.

The uniforms worn by each group include:

- The Ladybird Guides uniform is a red jumper, navy neckerchief, sash and woggle.
- The Brownie Guides uniform is a yellow jumper, navy neckerchief, sash and woggle.
- The Guides uniform is a blue hoodie with a blue or pink T-shirt, white neckerchief with pink and blue Celtic knots and navy woggle.
- The Senior Branch uniform is navy with green lining and green logo in a T-shirt and hoodie, and a pink neckerchief.
- Leaders wear a lilac or navy fleece, lilac T-shirt or blue blouse and a purple neckerchief with a navy woggle, or a blue and green neckerchief with a silver scarf ring. Leaders and Senior Branch members may also wear a badge tab.

=== Ladybirds ===
Ladybirds are aged 5–7 and make a two-part promise, which is reflected in their sign which uses only two fingers, unlike the Guide and Brownie sign which uses three.

=== Brownies ===
Brownies are aged from 7 to 10. Their Leader-in-charge is called a Brown Owl and her assistant a Tawny Owl. The girls are divided into sixes, each headed by a sixer, for the purpose of many activities.

=== Guides ===
Guides, aged 10 to 14 years, not only undertake weekly meetings, but also have the opportunity to camp in the outdoors. The Guiding programme gives the Guides an all round education and development.

=== Senior Branch ===
The Senior Branch of IGG covers the age grouping 14 to 30 years of age. The Senior Branch offers members the opportunity to experience adventure, participate in international events, develop self-confidence and grow in independence.

Older guides
When a Guide reaches 14 years of age she is eligible to attend Senior Branch events, follow the Senior Branch programme within her Guide Company (as a senior patrol or on her own). By the time she finishes Guides the natural progression will be to join a Senior Branch unit, become a Leader or both depending on the choices available to her locally.

Senior Branch members can work towards the Bronze Star, Silver Moon and Golden Sun awards. Completing these also qualifies one for the corresponding Gaisce award.

== See also ==
- Scouting Ireland
- Catholic Guides of Ireland
