= Catholic Guides of Ireland =

- Country: Ireland
- Founded: 1928
- Chief Commissioner: Emily McCann
- Website http://www.girlguidesireland.ie

The Catholic Guides of Ireland (Irish: Banóglaigh Catoilicí na hÉireann) is one of the two Guiding organisations in the Republic of Ireland. It has members in both the Republic of Ireland and Northern Ireland. Catholic Guides of Ireland began in 1928 and thus in 2003 celebrated 75 years of Guiding in Ireland.

Together with the Irish Girl Guides, it forms the Council of Irish Guiding Associations. In total three Guide associations operate on the island of Ireland. The other two are Irish Girl Guides (IGG) and Girlguiding Ulster, part of Girlguiding UK.

== Memberships ==
The Catholic Guides of Ireland is a member of the Council of Irish Guiding Associations, the national Guiding federation of Ireland. Through this council, it is a member of the WAGGS. The council serves 13,806 Guides (as of 2003).

== Age groups ==
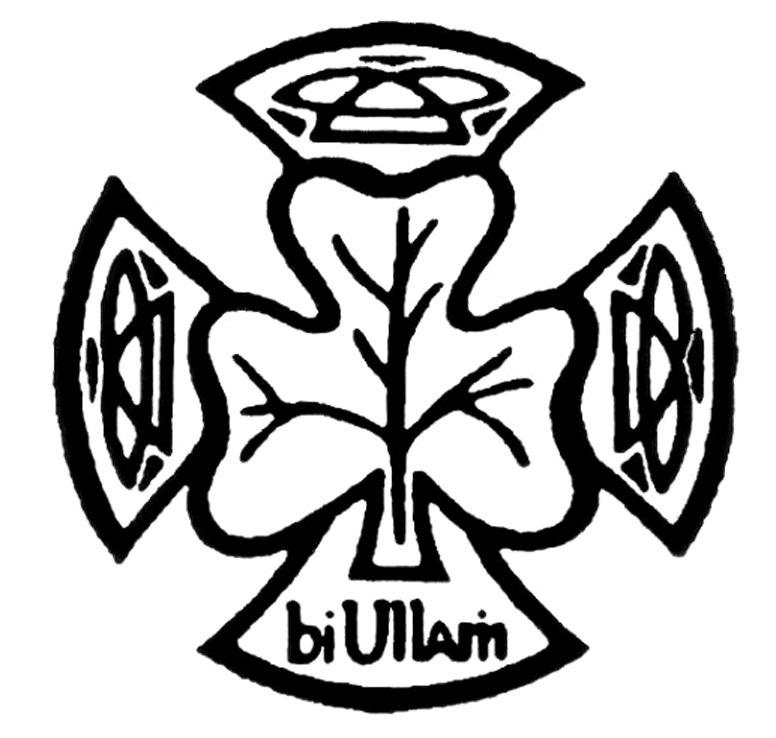
CGI Guide Promise Badge

The Catholic Guides of Ireland divides its members into the following age groups: Cygnet Guides, Brigin Guides, Guides, Rangers and adult volunteers.

=== Cygnet Guides ===
Cygnet Guides are between 5 and 7 years old. Elements of their Law spell out the word Cygnet thus:

Cares and Shares
Young and Special
Loves God
Is always Neat
Enjoys herself
Tries to be good

=== Brigín Guides ===
Girls are Brigín Guides starting at 6 or 7 until 10 years old. There are three levels: bronze, silver and gold. Each level is accomplished by fulfilling 19 challenges. Brigín Guides can also earn interest badges.

=== Guides ===
Guides are girls between 10 and 16 years old. They participate in a wide variety of activities including: the early zoo trip, sailing, cinema, camping, hiking, arts and crafts, anti bullying programs and more.

=== Rangers ===
Rangers are girls between 14 and 19 years old.

== Trips ==
Every two years or so, the guides and rangers go abroad before they have gone to such places as Denmark. In 2019, some guide groups were due to participate in a trip to Switzerland.

== See also ==
- Scouting Ireland
