= Girlguiding Ulster =

Girlguiding Ulster is one of the nine regions of Girlguiding UK. Its headquarters are at Lorne House, County Down. In 2006, there were approximately 500 units across Northern Ireland. In early 2026, Girlguiding Ulster had 10,000 members across 625 units.

In 1974, the Guides' headquarters in Belfast were burned down.

== Lorne House and Outdoor Activity Centre Girlguiding Ulster ==
Lorne is a 21-acre (85,000 m^{2}) estate in County Down with a variety of facilities for Guiding activities, including residential accommodation and campsites.

Lorne House was built in the Scottish Baronial style in 1875 by Henry Campbell, who named it after Lorne, Scotland, hereditary home of Clan Campbell. It was purchased by the Guides in 1946, and was officially opened in 1947.

== Lorne Estate ==
Built in 1875, Lorne still retains much of its original character. It was the home of Henry Campbell, a prominent Belfast linen merchant, who named the estate after the hereditary home of the Campbell clan in Scotland. Purchased by Girlguiding Ulster in 1946 it is now a residential venue.

=== Lorne House ===
The ground floor comprises a large entrance hall, solarium with seating area, dining room and 4 meeting rooms.

The upper floors in Lorne can accommodate 29 residential guests.

=== Marion Greeves Centre ===
The Marion Greeves Centre is a purpose built centre, with accommodation for up to 38 people. It is also known as the Brownie House.

=== Coach House ===
This former 2 storey stable block has been converted to provide self contained accommodation for 12 people.

=== Conference Centre ===
The conference centre can accommodate up to 120 delegates for training events, launches and presentations.

=== Camping ===
Lorne Estate offers camping facilities for groups of up to 600 participants.
