= Personal progression in Scouting Ireland =

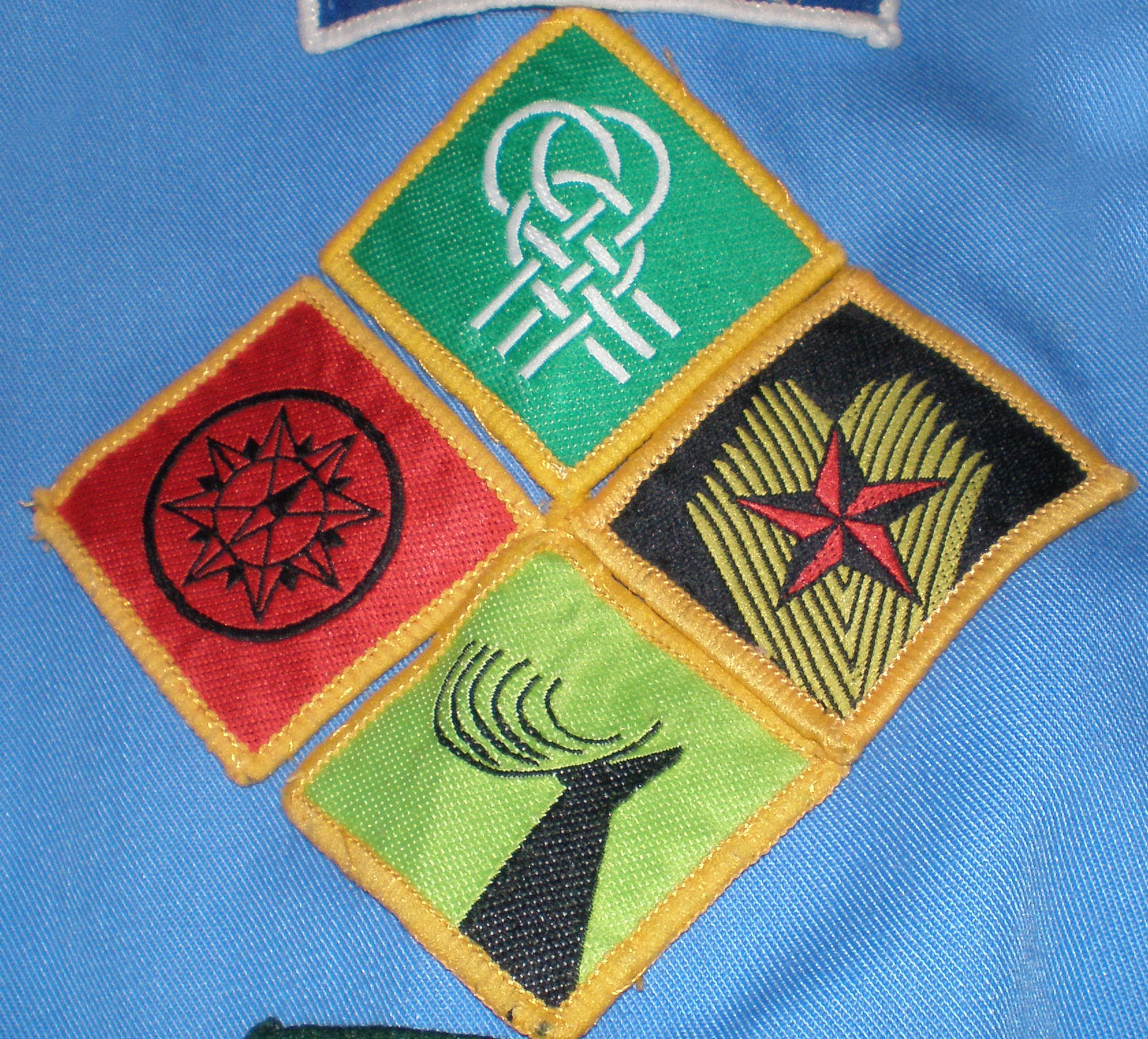
Progressive scheme badges

The ONE Programme personal progression system for youth members of Scouting Ireland has been designed and refactored since the merger of earlier organisations, using a number of key underlining principles. Activities and personal progression (badges) are designed to make use of the Scout method, maintain a consistent structure across the five youth programme sections, involve youth participation and personal experiences.

== One Programme for all ==
The principle of 'ONE Programme for all' means that each age range section delivers the programme in a similar way. Small groups are present in all Sections. Documentation is designed to appeal to the age range of the Section but presents the same concepts to young people in appropriate visual presentations and language. The badge scheme is also similar and the badge designs only signify different age ranges via different coloured designs.

== Programme creation ==
Young people are fully involved in the creation and management of their Scouting experience. This is done via the team and Section Council gatherings. They suggest, design and implement their own adventures and experiences assisted and facilitated by Adult Scouters. This collective experience is the programme of the group.

== Personal Journey ==
Every Scout is responsible for their own Personal Journey/experience of Scouting and plays a hand in designing and planning that journey. The Personal Journey ideal draws a young person to explore the SPICES (social, physical, intellectual, character, emotional and spiritual development areas) and enable them to learn, acquire knowledge and develop while participating in the Scout programme. The programme, that young people have designed with the help and assistance of Scouters follows a simple process PLAN, DO, REVIEW. Programmes are planned, activities are executed and the whole process is reviewed. The review process is an important stage as it allows young people to learn by doing, reflect on what has been learnt and carry this knowledge through to the next programme cycle. The review and reflection process is an important part of the personal journey of young people. It allows them to position themselves on their chosen path and provides them with pathways to future discoveries and experiences.

== Badges ==
There are four types of badges available to young people.

- Progress Award Badges
- Adventure Skills Badges
- Special Interest Badges
- Boatman Badges Scouter

== Personal Progress badges ==
Personal Progress Badges are awarded to young people in recognition of how they have developed and travelled along their personal Scouting journey. The badges are roughly linked to a 'Scouting years' programme. It is not based on individual tests but rather on a concept of bringing young people 'one step forward'. For some young people this will be easy for others more challenging. It will also be related to maturity of young people as they grow and develop. Scouters therefore need to be fully aware of 'where their Scouts are at' so they can have a fuller understanding of how far a young person has travelled in a particular Stage.

== Adventure Skills badges ==
The Adventure Skills are a set of 81 badges developed as part Scouting Ireland's ONE Programme. Adventure skills badges set prescribed detailed requirements to young people to achieve a set standard in a particular adventure skill. The requirements are progressive and ultimately reflect and pave the way to outside recognition by a governing body of a chosen skill. There are currently nine adventure skills badges: Sailing, Rowing, Paddling (Kayaking, Canoeing and Rafting), First aid, Camping, Pioneering, Backwoods, Hillwalking and Air with 9 stages within each of these skills. The badges are awarded based on demonstrated competencies at a given level for a given skill. Scouting Ireland established a memorandum of understanding with recognised external organisations (in both the Republic and the North) such as Irish Sailing Association, Canoeing Ireland, and Mountaineering Ireland to develop the respective criteria, and for those skills in which Scouting Ireland is a natural leader (Camping, Backwoods, Pioneering), the criteria were developed in-house. Paddling, Sailing and Rowing form a large part of the Sea Scout programme, and the Air adventure skill is derived from Air Scouting. Badges are open to all programme sections, although some of the higher levels are age-restricted. The criteria are set out so that they can be approved by non-Scouts. Scouting Ireland's campsites, as well as private companies, have developed training schemes which are aligned to the Adventure Skills. An independent app has been developed which shows the full list of criteria.

=== Equivalent external qualification ===
==== Hillwalking ====
Hillwalking Stage	Mountaineering Ireland
7	Mountain Skills
9	Mountain Leader

==== Paddling ====
Paddling Stage	Canoeing Ireland, British Canoe Union
5	Level 1
6	Level 2
7	Level 3
8	Level 4
9	Level 5

==== Sailing ====
Sailing Stage	Irish Sailing Association, Royal Yachting Association
4	Start Sailing
5	Basic Skills
6	Improving Skills
8	Adventure 1
9	Adventure 2

== Special Interest badges ==
Special interest badges are open ended badges that reflect the interest of the young person undertaking them. Any subject is possible and the requirements are designed by the young person in consultation and agreement with their Scouters. There are five badge designs, badges are presented under a number of heading into which the special interest subject will fall. Heading include -Skill, Physical, Adventure, Community, Environment. Badge requirements will differ depending on the individual, the main requirement being 'doing one's best', recognising personal effort, rather than achieving a prescribed standard. Badge requirements are broad enough to allow youth members to set agree their own criteria with their Scouter.

== Chief Scout Award ==
The Chief Scout Award is the superlative youth programme award in each of the Programme Sections. It is designed to tie-in with the Gaisce Award, and the Chief Scout Award for Scouts, Ventures Scouts, and Rover Scouts are awarded jointly with the Bronze, Silver and Gold awards respectively. Requirements for the award are a number of Adventure Skills, Special Interest Badges, an Expedition, and camp with an inter-cultural aspect.

== Role of Scouters ==
The role of the Scouters is one of assisting, supporting, facilitating, motivating, being a role model rather than directive. Younger age ranges will require more facilitation and direction but this should be reversed in older age ranges to one of 'mentor or coach'. The Scouters need to be aware of the young people in their Section, and understand 'where they are' in relation to their development as young people. Scouters will assist in reviewing activities and help young people to reflect on their experiences and personal journey through Scouting.

== Predecessor badges ==
ONE Programme's Adventure Skills and Special Interest badges (along with a set of Nautical Badges in each section to tie-in with the Sea Scout symbolic framework) replaced the legacy attainment and merit badges.

=== Attainment badges ===
Attainment badges were awards earned by youth members, based on a variety of adventurous outdoor activities. These badges were originally developed by the former Scouting Ireland S.A.I. for its sectional programmes in the Scout section and the Sea Scout section.

==== Badges ====
A core of 7 attainment badges ("The Magnificent Seven") were developed by the SAI which are universal across the Scout programme and the Sea Scout programme. A further 7 badges were developed by the Sea Scout team which are mostly specialist water activities badges that aid the Sea Scout programme, supplementing its primary progressive badge scheme. These badges, while developed for just one of the programmes, were open to members of both the Scout and Sea Scout section to achieve. The 14 attainment badges are listed below.

Name	Programme
Backwoods	Scouts & Sea Scouts
Camp Skills	Scouts & Sea Scouts
Camping	Scouts & Sea Scouts
Canoeing	Sea Scouts
Cycling	Sea Scouts
Expedition	Scouts & Sea Scouts
First Aid	Scouts & Sea Scouts
Hiking	Scouts & Sea Scouts
Powerboating	Sea Scouts
Rafting	Sea Scouts
Rowing	Sea Scouts
Sailing	Sea Scouts
Survival	Scouts & Sea Scouts
Swimming	Sea Scouts

=== Merit badges ===
Merit badges were awards earned by youth members, based on activities within an area of study by completing a list of periodically updated requirements..

Merit badges were a universal award for achievement within the Scouting movement. The purpose of the merit badge programme was to allow Scouts to examine subjects to determine if they would like to further pursue them as a career or as a vocation. Originally, the programme also introduced Scouts to the life skills of contacting an adult they hadn't met before, arranging a meeting and then demonstrating their skills, similar to a job or college interview. Increasingly, though, merit badges were earned in a class setting at troop meetings and summer camps.

Many of the badges were more advanced versions of Cub Scout (Macaoimh) badges.

Name	Section	Further reading
Map-maker	Scoutcraft	Cartography
Pioneering	Scoutcraft	Pioneering
Signalling	Scoutcraft	Signalling
Camper	Camping	Camping
Camp Chef	Camping	Camping
Campfire Leader	Camping	Campfire
Quartermaster	Camping	Quartermaster
Camp Leader	Camping	
Hiker	Adventure	Hiking
Hike Leader	Adventure	
Hill Walker	Adventure	
Orienteer	Physical Ability	Orienteering
Cyclist	Physical Ability	Cycling
Athlete	Physical Ability	Athletics
Sports	Physical Ability	Sport
Self Defence	Physical Ability	Self Defence
Electrician	Electronics	
Electronics	Electronics	
Radio	Electronics	
Computer Applications	Electronics	
Computer Programmer	Electronics	
Computer Skills	Electronics	
Car Mechanic	Skills	
Home Manager	Skills	
Metal Worker	Skills	
Woodworker	Skills	
Woodcarver	Skills	
Bookbinder	Crafts	
Artist	Crafts	
Printer	Crafts	
Photographer	Crafts	
Basketry	Crafts	
Leathercraft	Crafts	
Collector	Crafts	
Equestrian	Nature	
Sea Fishing	Nature	
Pet Keeper	Nature	
Gardener	Nature	
Angler	Nature	
Archaeologist	Natural Sciences	
Geologist	Natural Sciences	
Farmer	Natural Sciences	
Naturalist	Faith and Environment	
Observer	Faith and Environment	
Forester	Faith and Environment	
Civics	Faith and Environment	
Scripture	Faith and Environment	
Faith	Faith and Environment	
Bell ringer	Entertainment	
Bugler	Entertainment	
Musician	Entertainment	
Entertainer	Entertainment	
Irish Dancer	Entertainment	
Fire Safety	Public Service	
Emergency	Public Service	
Guide	Public Service	
Interpreter	Public Service	
Life Saver	Public Service	
Advanced Life Saver	Public Service	
Home Maintenance	Public Service	
Public Health	Public Service	
Public Speaking	Public Service	
Consumer	Public Service	
Secretary	Public Service	
Librarian	Public Service	
Social Awareness	Social awareness	
World Friendship	Social awareness	
Conservation	Social awareness	
Gaeilge	Languages	Gaeilge

== Sources ==
- The Scout Badgebook (Scouting Ireland)
