= Hazel Adair (novelist) =

British novelist

Hazel Iris Wilson Addis
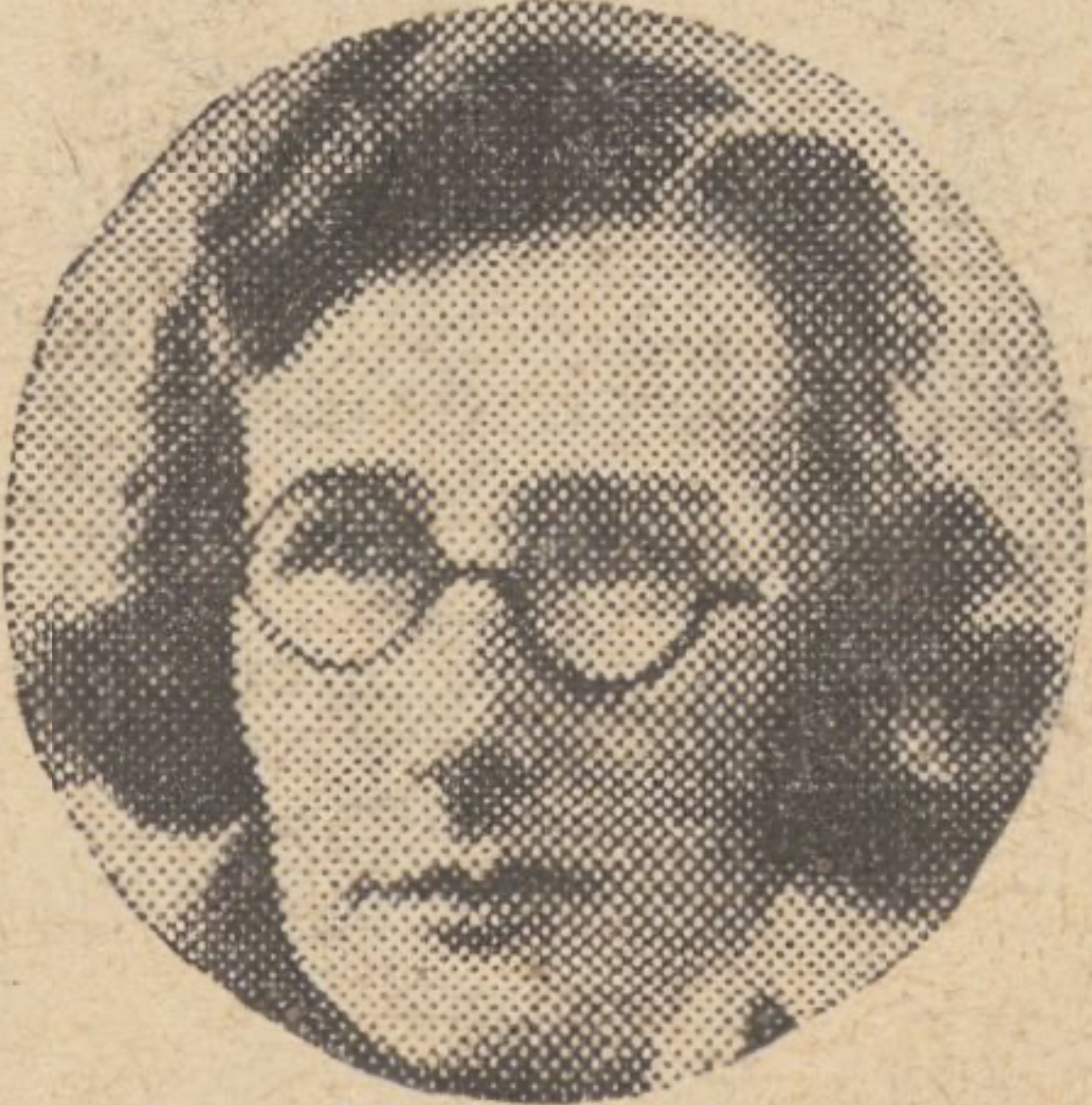
- Daily Mirror, 1938
- Born: Hazel Iris Wilson; 30 May 1900; Norwich, Norfolk, England
- Died: 1 October 1990 (aged 90); Stowmarket, Suffolk, England
- Spouse: Eric Elrington Addis (Peter Drax)
- Writing career
- Pen name: Hazel Adair; H. I. Addis; A. J. Heritage
- Language: English language

Hazel Iris Addis (née Wilson; 30 May 1900 – 1 October 1990) was a British writer of over 20 novels from 1935 to 1953, under the pseudonyms Hazel Adair and A. J. Heritage. Under her real name, H. I. Addis, she also published works relating to Cub Scouts.

== Biography ==
Hazel Iris Wilson was born on 30 May 1900 in Norwich, Norfolk, England, daughter of Annie Margaret and Cecil Wilson. She married the writer Eric Elrington Addis (alias Peter Drax) in 1926. From 1926 to 1929, she lived in New Zealand, while her husband was based there with the Royal Navy. On their return to England, they lived in Oxshott, Surrey. Adair returned to New Zealand with her two children in 1940, and remained there until after World War II ended. Her husband was killed in after a bombing raid in Alexandria, Egypt in August 1941.

Adair wrote over twenty novels, mostly under the pseudonym Hazel Adair. A review of her first book, published in 1935, said that she was "plucky .. set[ting] out to make a novel from a happy marriage!" The reviewer commented that the book was "brightly written and ends happily, yet it has its graver side ... [and] an amusing sub-plot." One reviewer of her second novel felt that the craftsmanship was better than in the first, but that the theme (of an unconventional woman shocking a respectable village) was over-used. Another reviewer said, "Miss Adair adds a new tang and a new honesty to the situation", but felt that there was some "antiquated machinery in the actual plot". A Times Literary Supplement reviewer wrote of The Heritage (1939) that it presented "a splendid tangle of events that all resolve themselves most satisfactorily", but commented that "One's credulity is perhaps a little strained at being asked to believe that devout Catholics should place such implicit faith in the theory of reincarnation, but otherwise the story is excellent of its kind."

She was also active in the Boy Scouts Association. She was a member of the training staff at Gilwell Park, England, for several years before WWII, and was awarded the Boy Scouts Association Medal of Merit for the work she did in New Zealand during WWII. During the 1950s and 1960s, she was Headquarters Assistant Commissioner for Wolf Cubs, and at the 9th World Scout Jamboree, 1957, she was the women's Indaba chief. In 1955, she received the Silver Wolf Award in recognition of services of "most exceptional character" over 26 years. She wrote several works for Cub Scouts, including a book of play scripts.

She died on 1 October 1990 in Stowmarket. She had two children, Valerie and Jeremy; Jeremy founded the magazine Books Ireland in 1976.

== Bibliography ==
=== As Hazel Adair ===
- Wanted, A Son (1935)
- Mistress Mary (1936)
- A Torch is Lit (1936)
- All the Trumpets (1937)
- Red Bunting (1937)
- Over the Stile (1938)
- Sparrow Market (1938)
- Bendix and Son (1939)
- The Heritage (1939)
- Cockadays (1940)
- Mahogany and Deal (1940)
- The Lady of Garth House (1941)
- John Manifold (1942)
- Escape to Peril (1944)
- The Enamelled Bird-Cage (1945)
- Quoth the Raven (1947)
- Mistress of One (1948)
- Challenge to Seven (1949)
- The Gentle Vagabond (1950)
- We Only Wanted Peter (1952)
- No Bells Rang (1953)

=== As H. I. Addis ===
- New Plays for Wolf Cubs (1935) (with V. V. Vanston)
- Crime Within Crime (1937)
- Duty to God in the Wolf Cub Pack (1951)
- Training Yarns for Akela (1963)
- Programme Planning in the Cub Scout pack (1975)

=== As A. J. Heritage ===
- The Happy Years (1938)
