= World Scout Indaba =

International gatherings of Scout Leaders

Indaba
- Nederland Indaba, 1960
- Country: various (list below)
- Date: 1952–1960

The Scout leader Indabas, retrospectively called World Scout Indabas, were three gatherings of Scout leaders from around the world, held in 1952, 1957 and 1960.

== History ==
The idea of an international meeting of Scout leaders was proposed to The International Conference of the Boy Scout Movement in 1949, by The Boy Scouts Association of the United Kingdom which submitted that only a very small percentage of Scout leaders were able to take part in a major international Scout gathering. The name Indaba was suggested by Lord Rowallan and was claimed to be Zulu for "tribal conference" but the connection, if any, to Zulu culture is obscure. The reason a Zulu word was used to describe the event was not explicitly stated.

Only three Scout leader Indabas were held:

Year	Event	Location	Host country	Dates	Notes
1952	1st Indaba	Gilwell Park	United Kingdom	15–24 July 1952	Planned for 4000 but only 600 attended from 49 countries
1957	2nd Indaba	Sutton Coldfield	United Kingdom	1-12 August 1957	combined with the 9th World Scout Jamboree and 6th World Rover Moot, to celebrate 50 years of Scouting
1960	3rd Indaba	Gilwell Ada's Hoeve, Ommen	Netherlands	August 1960	Low attendance and poor international representation

=== 1st Indaba ===
The 1st Indaba of Scout leaders was held 15–24 July 1952 at Gilwell Park. It was organised by The Boy Scouts Association's chief executive commissioner, Fred Hurll and headquarters commissioner for relationships, John Frederick Colquhoun. The association's Chief Scout, Lord Rowallan, opened the Indaba. Attendance was expected to be about 4,000, but only about 600 Scouters from 49 countries participated. Fifty Australian scouters, twelve Canadians and four Americans attended the event. Separate discussions were held on Wolf Cubs, Boy Scouts, handicapped Scouts, "the older Scout" and Rovers and commissioner service. Reports were presented at a plenary session. The Boy Scouts Association's president, Prince Henry, Duke of Gloucester closed the Indaba with the words: "Let it be the determination of all who have been here at Gilwell to spread the Scout spirit wherever they go, that spirit of peace and friendliness which is so sorely needed in the world today." The International Committee recommended continuing Indabas every four years, limited to 1,000 participants.

=== 2nd Indaba ===
The 2nd Indaba was held from 1st to 12th August 1957, at Sutton Coldfield, to mark the 50th jubilee year of Scouting and the centenary of the birth of Robert Baden-Powell and held concurrently with and adjacent to the 9th World Scout Jamboree and 6th World Rover Moot, as well as the third Girl Guide World Camp. It was organised by The Boy Scouts Association's deputy chief scout, Sir Rob Lockhart, as camp chief, its chief executive commissioner, Fred Hurll, as deputy camp chief, and its Gilwell Park camp chief's deputy Kenneth H. Stevens, as the executive commissioner. The Jamboree-Indaba-Moot was opened by The Boy Scouts Association's president, Prince Henry, Duke of Gloucester on 1 August and closed with a talk by Olave, Lady Baden-Powell.

=== 3rd Indaba ===
The 3rd Indaba was held in August 1960, at Gilwell Ada's Hoeve, Ommen, Netherlands but, again, had a low attendance and poor international representation.
