= 9th World Scout Jamboree =

1957 event in Sutton Park, England

- 9th World Scout Jamboree
- Location: Sutton Park, England
- Country: United Kingdom
- Date: 1957
- Attendance: 30,000
Previous; 8th World Scout Jamboree	Next; 10th World Scout Jamboree

The 9th World Scout Jamboree, also known as the Jubilee Jamboree, was held at Sutton Park, Royal Town of Sutton Coldfield, Warwickshire, England, for twelve days during August 1957. The Jamboree marked dual milestones as it was both the 50th anniversary of the Scouting movement since its inception at Brownsea Island and the 100th anniversary of the birth of Scouting's founder Robert Baden-Powell.

Held concurrently with the World Jamboree was the 2nd World Scout Indaba and the 6th World Rover Moot, as well as the third Girl Guide World Camp.

== Overview ==
All the events took place on adjacent sites within Sutton Park located in Sutton Coldfield. As well as the 33,000 participants from 85 countries, an additional 17,000 British Scouts were camping on other organised sites spread over a fifteen-mile radius from Sutton Park and attending the daily organised events at the main campsite, giving a total attendance of 50,000 Scouts in residence, with a further 7,000 being bussed in from locations all over England for day-long visits that were spread over the 12 days of the Jamboree.

== Control and organisation ==
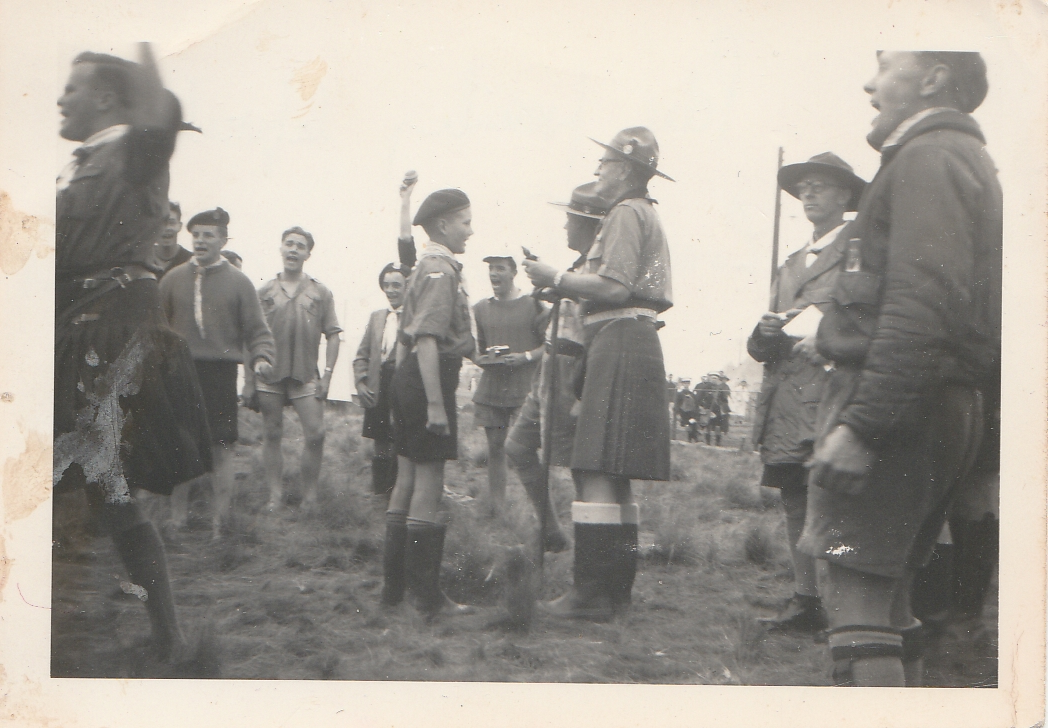
An Irish scout presenting a leprechaun doll to Lord Rowallan, Chief Scout at the Jamboree

The vast undertaking was under the leadership of Sir Robert Lockhart, Deputy Chief Scout, as the Camp Chief. He was assisted by Chief Executive Scout Commissioner Fred Hurll who was Deputy Camp Chief. The Jamboree's Executive Commissioner was Kenneth H. Stevens, the permanent commissioner at Gilwell Park, Scouting's permanent campsite near London, who oversaw the organisation of the many satellite camp sites.

== Addresses ==
The Jamboree was formally declared opened on 1 August by Prince Philip, Duke of Edinburgh, accompanied by the British Prime Minister, Harold Macmillan. The Jamboree was closed on 12 August by the World Chief Guide, Olave, Lady Baden-Powell, who gave her speech alternately in both English and French. Lady Baden-Powell was accompanied by the Lord Mayor of Birmingham. The concurrent Jamboree-Indaba-Moot, known by most as JIM, was opened by Prince Henry, Duke of Gloucester.

== Events ==
9th Jamboree Gang Show programme cover

During this Jubilee Jamboree, Scout leader and radio ham Les Mitchell announced his idea of the Jamboree on the Air allowing Scouts worldwide who were unable to attend to experience the event over the radio and to hold annual radio "meets". The 1957 event was the first Jamboree that had been held in England to have its own commemorative postage stamps produced by the General Post Office.

In conjunction with the Jamboree the Scouting Association promoted a week-long Gang Show at the Hippodrome Theatre in central Birmingham between 5 August and 10 August, led by Ralph Reader and featuring the full 150 strong cast from his London-based Gang Show. Buses were provided each evening to bus up to 500 campers into the city centre for the show.

Daily rail excursion charter trains were laid on to transport the international Scouts on sight-seeing trips to various British cities, including Nottingham, Leicester, Swindon, Loughborough, Stoke-on-Trent, London and Cardiff. One day Queen Elizabeth visited the camp hospital where many were being treated for the flu.

The event is commemorated by a short stone pillar in the centre of Sutton Park that still stands near the site of Lady Baden-Powell's closing address.

The weather during the 12 days ranged from an oppressive summer heatwave to two days of torrential rain that turned many pathways into quagmires. Many of the American Boy Scouts were fortunate in that the US Air Force brought in cots to avoid sleeping in water that flooded many campsites.. The Cinema Museum in London holds film of the Jamboree.

== Gallery ==
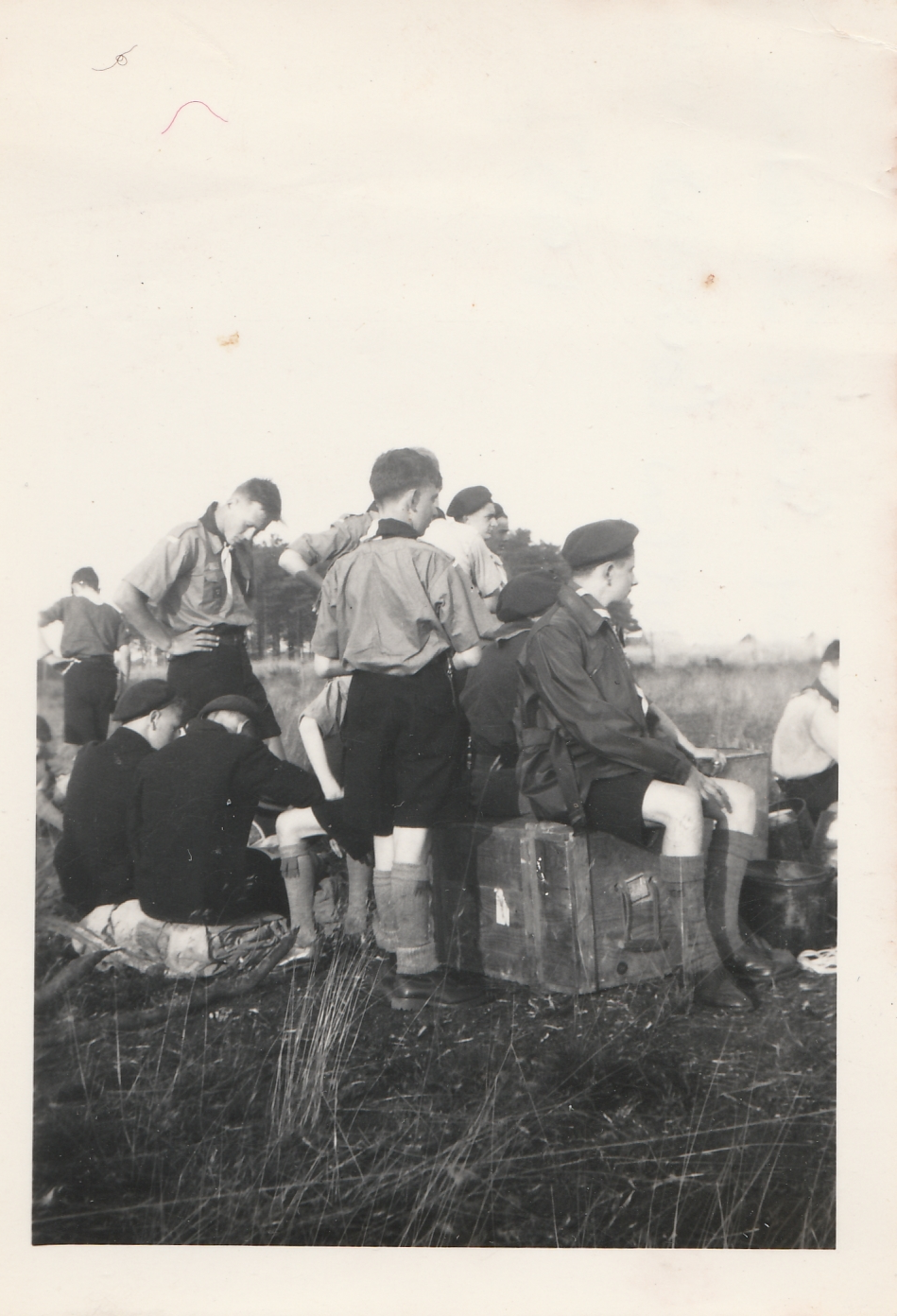
Scouts resting

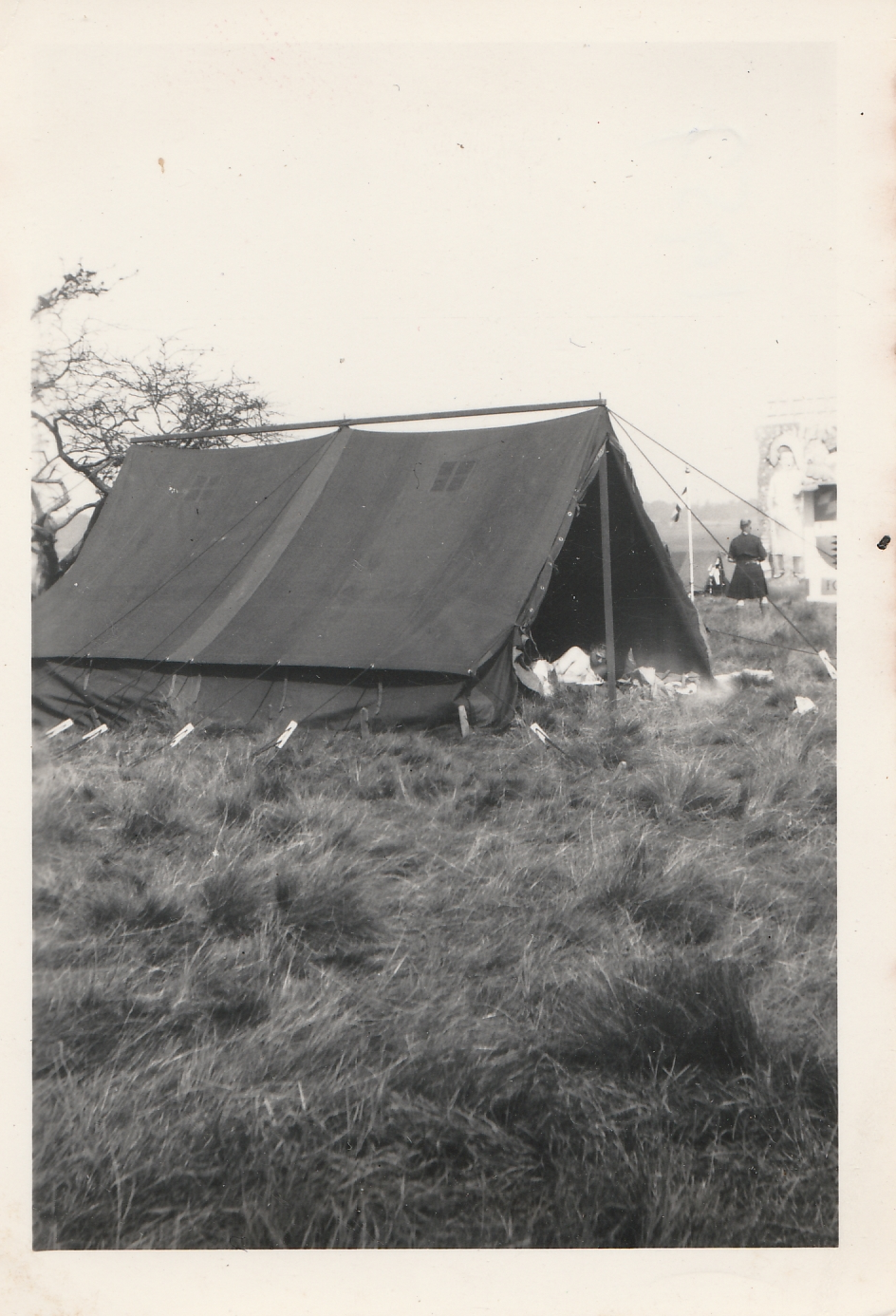
Scout tent

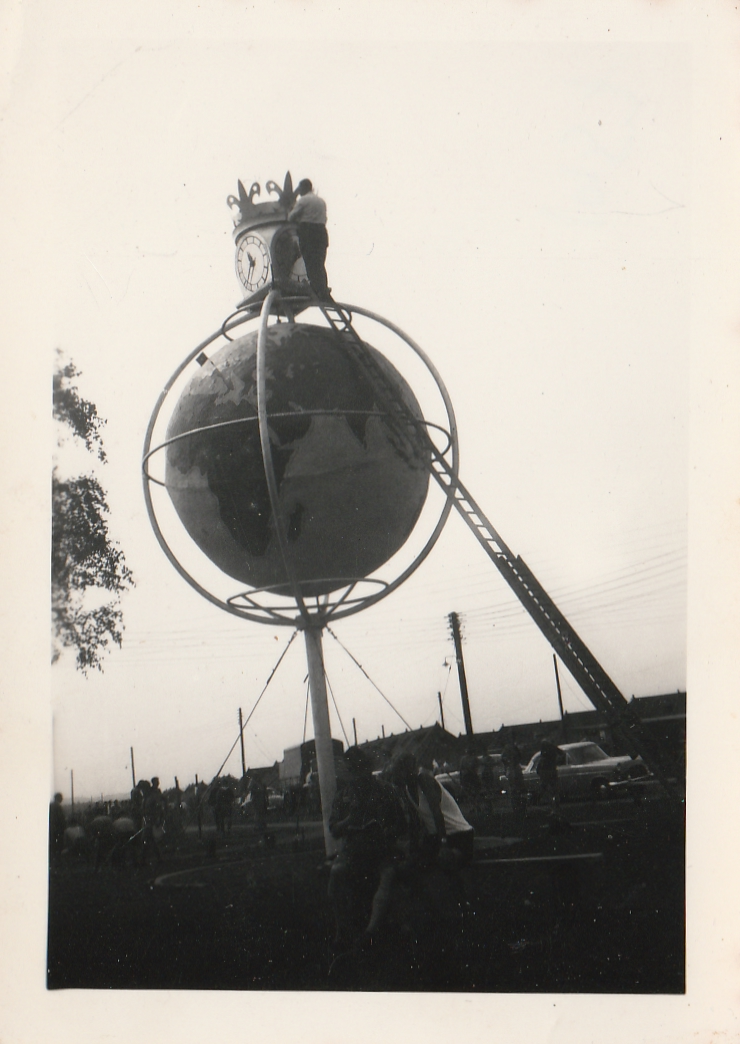
Each subcamp was themed on one of the previous eight jamboree locations

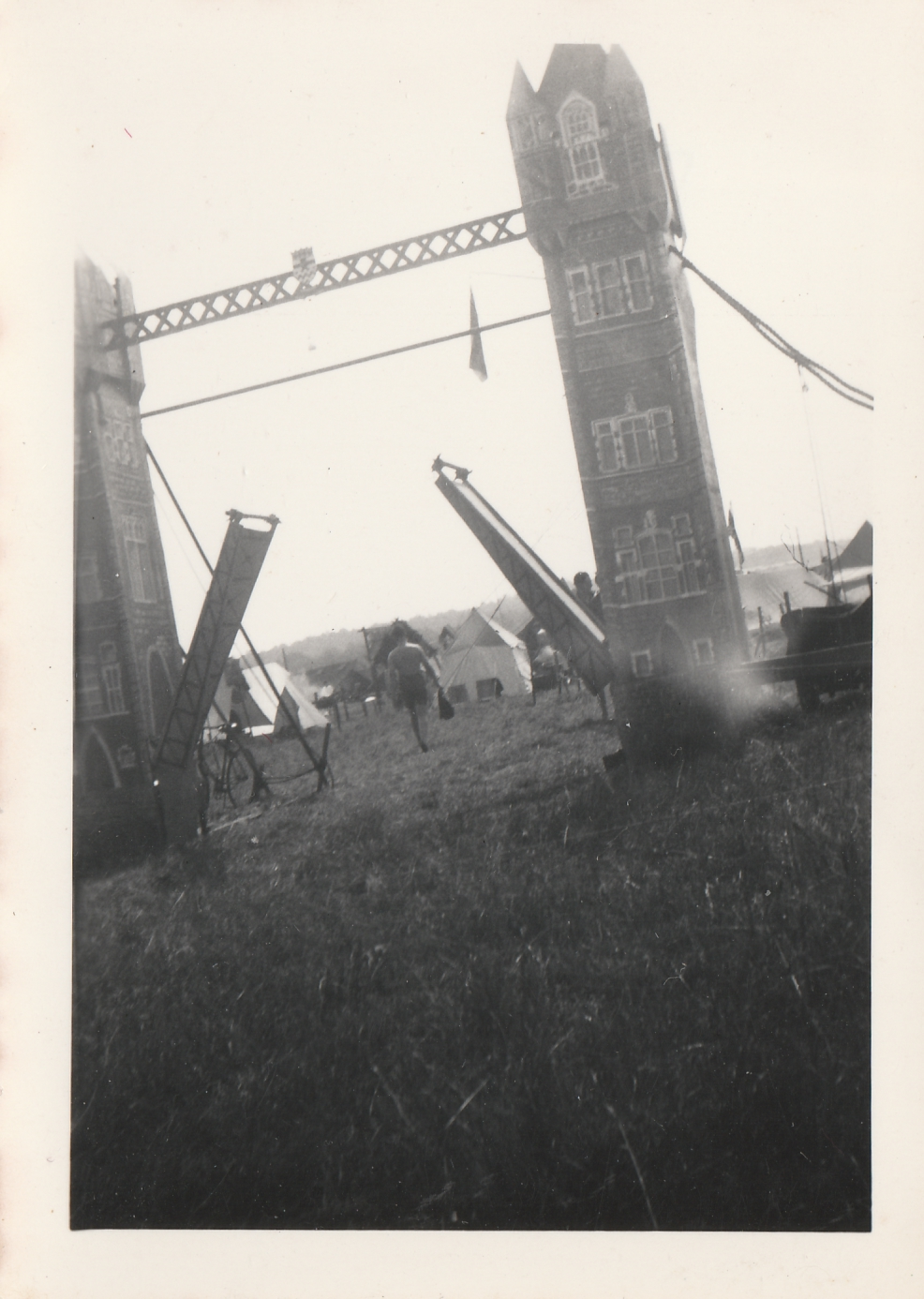
London Bridge (1st World Scout Jamboree)

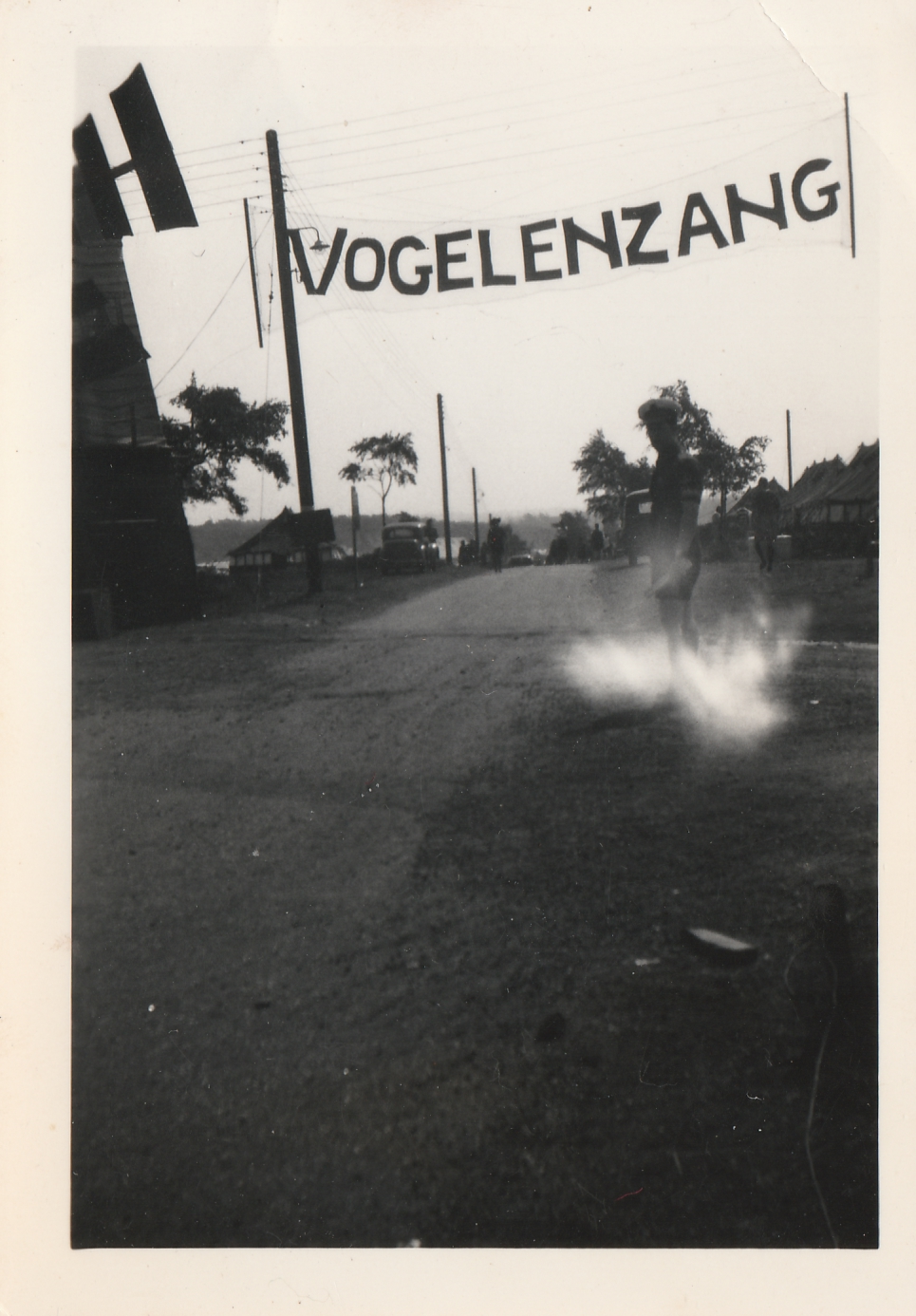
Vogelenzang (5th World Scout Jamboree)

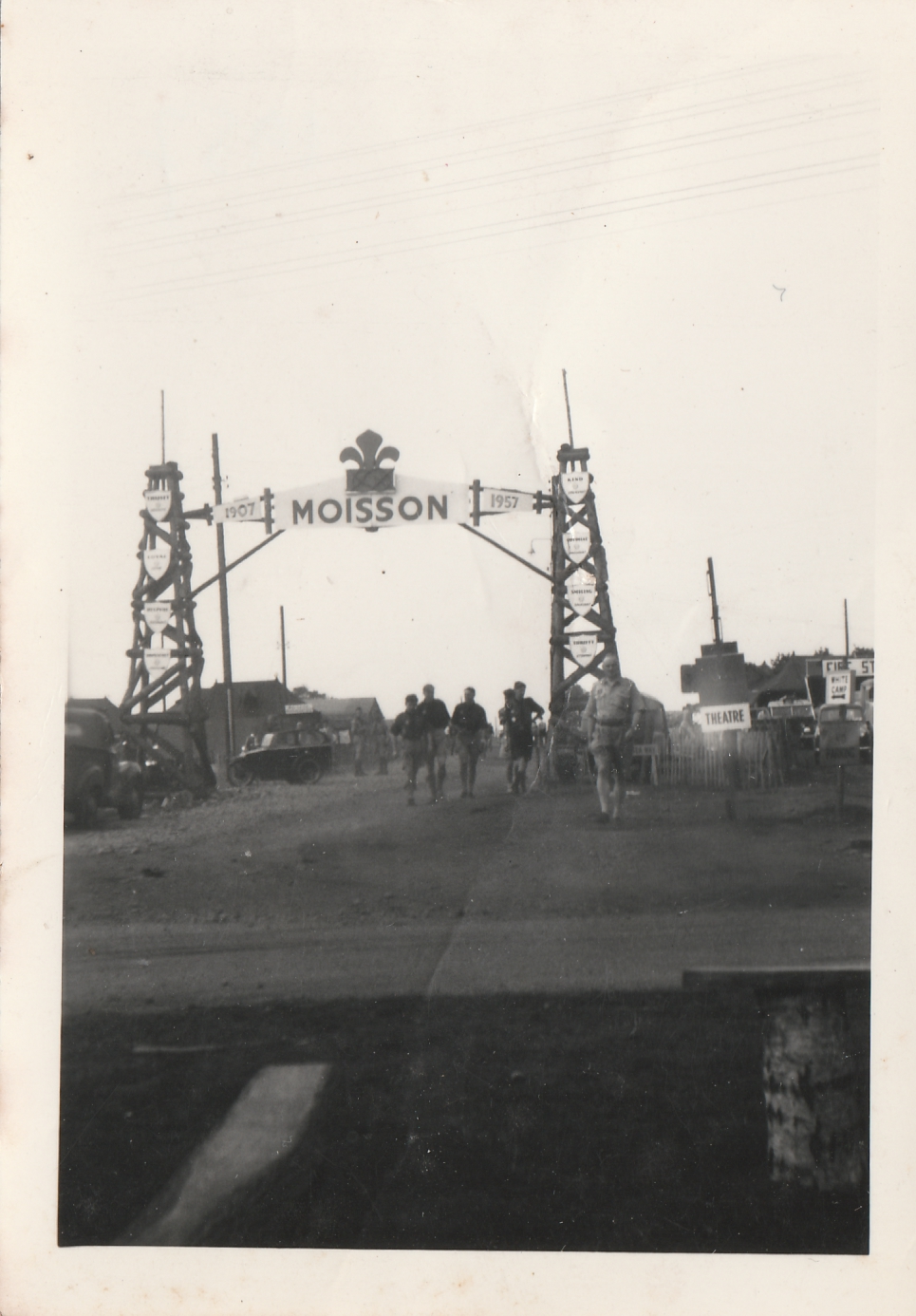
Moisson (6th World Scout Jamboree)

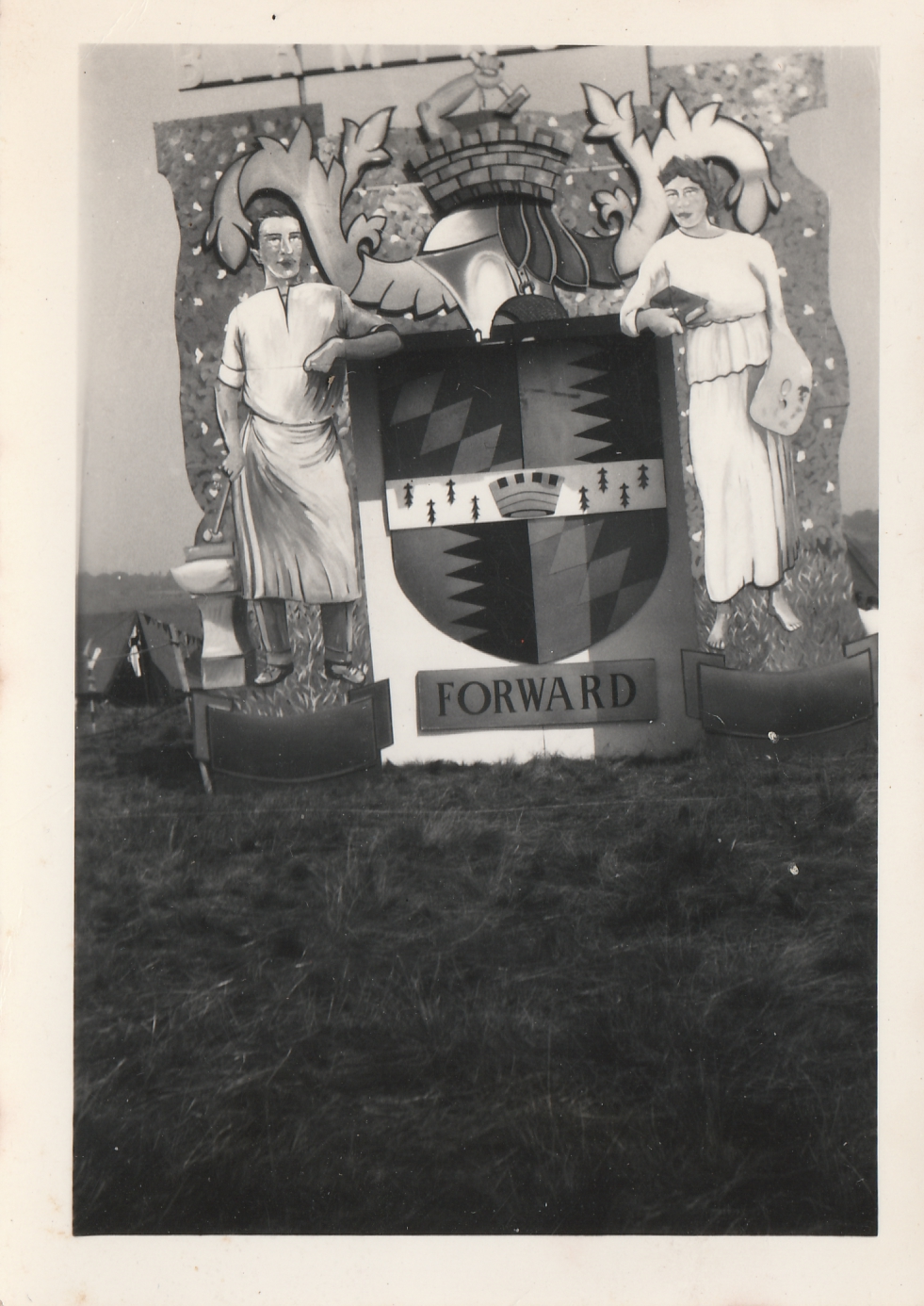
An entrance to a camp
