= Hazel Adair =

Hazel Adair may refer to:

- Hazel Adair (novelist) (1900–1990), British novelist
- Hazel Adair (screenwriter) (1920–2015), British actress and screenwriter
