= John Frederick Colquhoun =

British scouting leader (1890–1968)

- Born: 22 November 1890; Stoke Newington, London
- Died: 28 August 1968 (aged 77); University College Hospital, London
- Occupation: Tax inspector
- Known for: Long-serving headquarters official of The Boy Scouts Association of the United Kingdom

John Frederick Colquhoun, CBE (22 November 1890 – 28 August 1968), nicknamed "Koko", was a long-serving headquarters official of The Boy Scouts Association of the United Kingdom and served on the World Organization of the Scout Movement's committee from 1959 to 1965.

== Background ==
Colquhoun was The Boy Scouts Association Headquarters Commissioner for Wolf Cubs from 1927 to 1938 and Akela Leader (head trainer of Wolf Cub leaders), Gilwell Park. He organized the first International Wolf Cub Conference at Gilwell Park in 1938. At The Boy Scouts Association's Bournemouth Conference of April 1927, Colquhoun presented a paper titled 'The position of Rover leaders' which resulted in discussion on co-ordination (i.e. who was in charge) between Wolf Cubmasters, Scoutmasters and Rover leaders that led to the establishment of the Scout Group organizational structure and new rank of Group Scoutmaster from 1 January 1928. In the leadership changes following the death of The Boy Scouts Association's founder and first Chief Scout, Robert Baden-Powell, Colquhoun became Deputy Chief Commissioner in January 1942 and, in 1943, chairman of the General Purposes Committee, the main sub-committee of the association's committee. In 1948 Colquhoun also became The Boy Scouts Association Headquarters Commissioner for Kindred Societies (later Headquarters Commissioner for Relationships) and, in that role, was the honorary organizer of the B.-P. Guild of Old Scouts from its formation in June 1948 until February 1951, after the Guild had become "autonomous" in October 1950. He was chairman of the association's religious panel. Colquhoun toured Australia and New Zealand in 1950 and 1951 to inspect The Boy Scouts Association's branches. He represented The Boy Scouts Association Imperial Headquarters and its Chief Scout of the British Commonwealth and Empire at the Second Pan-Pacific Jamboree held at Greystanes near Sydney, Australia from 29 December 1952 to 8 January 1953. He and Fred Hurll, The Boy Scouts Association's Chief Executive Commissioner, were the organizers of the 1st World Scout Indaba (a gathering of Scout Leaders from around the world) which took place at Gilwell Park for a week in July, 1952. Colquhoun contributed to books, booklets and articles on Scouting and authored "Scouting as an instrument of Evangelism" in Theology (1949), What I.H.Q. does (1949), You and I.H.Q. (1956) and Running a Scout Group (1954).

Colquhoun was made an Officer of the Order of the British Empire in the 1946 Birthday Honours and a Commander of the order in the 1966 Birthday Honours for his services to The Boy Scouts Association.
