= Silver Wolf Award (The Scout Association) =

Award of The Scout Association in the United Kingdom

Silver Wolf
- Owner: The Scout Association
- Awarded for: Outstanding service to Scouting

The Silver Wolf is an award of The Scout Association now awarded "for services of the most exceptional character." The award consists of a small Silver Wolf sculpture suspended from a dark green and yellow neck ribbon.

== History ==
Originally, the Silver Wolf was awarded to King's Scout award holders of at least 2 years service and who earned 12 proficiency badges, who performed under exceptional circumstances like saving a life or repeated acts of bravery, endurance, or self-sacrifice. The Silver Wolf remained a youth award until 1922, when it became an award for adults, for services to the Scout Movement.

Since its inception, the Silver Wolf has remained the "unrestricted gift of the Chief Scout" and could be withdrawn. "County Commissioners and overseas Chief Scouts may submit recommendations to Scout Headquarters."

It was Robert Baden-Powell's practice to give the Silver Wolf awards to Scouters in any country who had done outstandingly valuable work for the Scout Movement. As it was an award of The Boy Scouts Association in the United Kingdon, in 1934, the International Conference of the Boy Scout Movement introduced its Bronze Wolf Award.

== Recipients ==
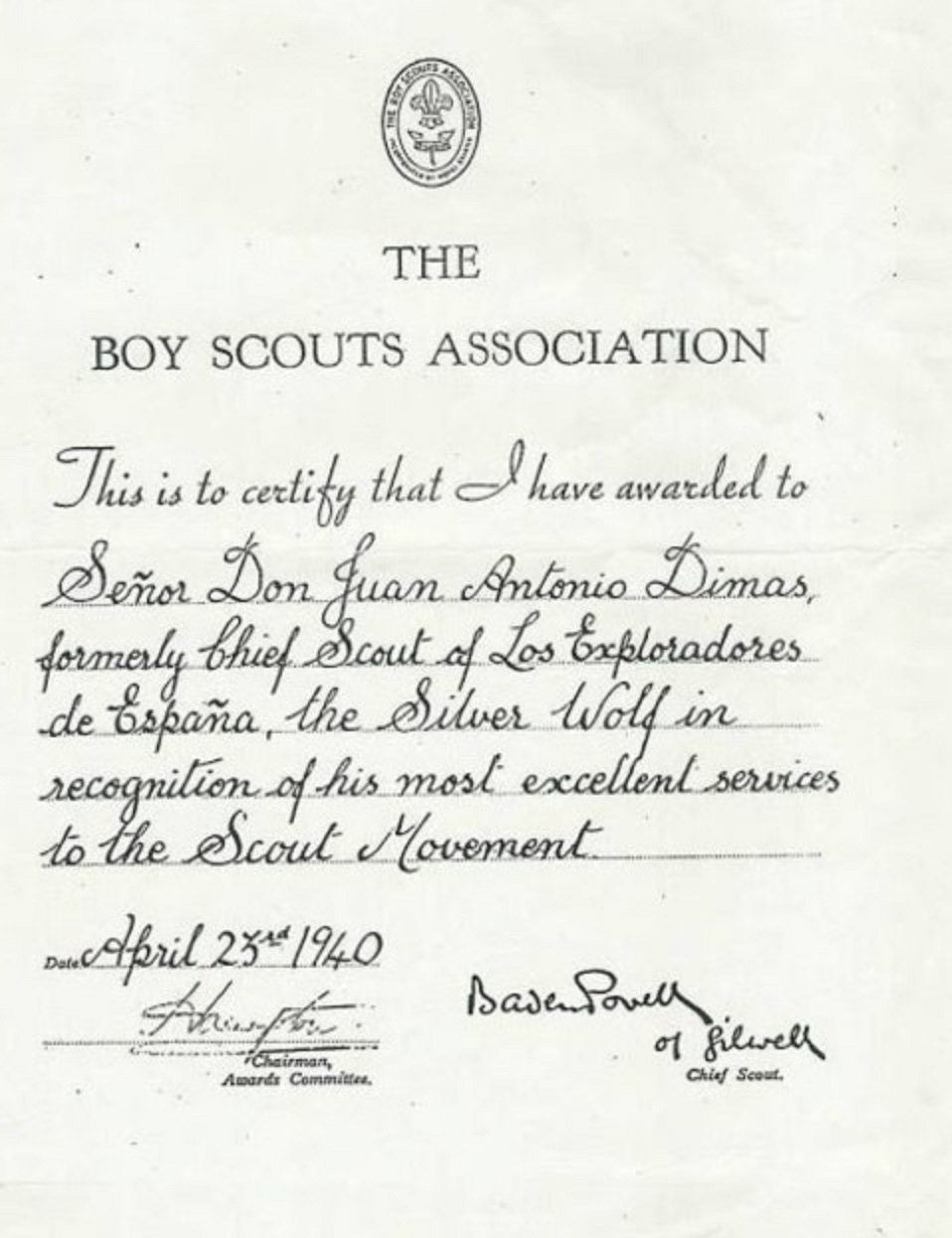
The Silver Wolf Award certificate presented to Juan Antonio Dimas, former Chief Scout of Spain, just a few months after the end of the Spanish Civil War. Spanish Scouting was disbanded by the Franco's regime in that same year.

- Pre-1922, numerous Boy Scouts
- Hazel Adair (novelist)
- Demetrios Alexatos
- Robert Baden-Powell, 1st Baron Baden-Powell
- Martyn Bain
- Mervyn Wingfield, 8th Viscount Powerscourt
- Reginald Brabazon, 12th Earl of Meath
- Francis Ronald Gladstone Sanders
- Vera Barclay
- Dudley Barrow
- Richard Bassett
- Daniel Carter Beard
- Edward Wentworth Beatty
- Annie Besant
- Glad Bincham
- Walter von Bonstetten
- John Buchan
- Matthew K Butterfield (2023)
- Carol II of Romania
- Mario di Carpegna
- Gordon Carr
- Bernard Chacksfield
- Jean Corbisier
- John Dawe
- Donald Deacon
- Juan Antonio Dimas
- Haydn Dimmock
- Kay Fancis (2023)
- Rosemary Fletcher MBE
- Robert Gammon
- William Gentry
- Michal Grazynski
- Jacques Guérin-Desjardins
- Gustaf V
- Victor Halward
- Dean Harding
- Charles Hoadley
- Stuart Howells
- Forbes Howie
- Linda Hurford
- Stanley Ince
- Mike Jackson
- Peter James
- John Kingsmell
- Gail Langton
- Maurice William Lee
- André Lefèvre (Scouting)
- Colin H. Livingstone
- Roderick Lloyd
- Ken Arnold
- Ivison Macadam
- William de Bois Maclaren
- Musette Majendie
- Kenneth Paul Marks
- Hubert S. Martin
- Douglas Mawson
- John May
- Joan Ann McGovern
- Roy Morris
- Garth Morrison
- Alan Naylor
- P. B. Nevill
- Louis-Clément Picalausa
- Peter Charles Pilbeam (2005)
- Rudolf Plajner
- Roger Plumb
- Graeme Popay
- Jean Jacques Rambonnet
- Ian Robinson - Cardiff 2021
- John Rous, 4th Earl of Stradbroke
- Henry Way Rymill
- Mortimer L. Schiff
- Jacques Sevin
- Dougie Simmers
- Alec Spalding
- William M Stern (2003)
- Francis George Stevens
- Steve Sudbury
- Muriel Thedham
- Hirohito
- Sano Tsuneha
- George Turner Waldegrave
- W. F. Waters
- James E. West
- John Frederick Wilkinson
- J. S. Wilson
- Simon C. Yew
- Geoff Hall (2024)
- John Bennett MBE
- Scott Park (1st Stirlingshire)
- Ian Windler (2nd Market Drayton)
- Denis Smith (Taunton)
- Stuart William Dyall (Gt.Manchester East)
- Simon Burgess 2023 (1st Prague Scout Group)
- Adam C Prentice (69th Ayrshire, Tarbolton)
- Frank McHugh BEM (33rd Ayrshire, Dalmellington)
- Iain Burgoyne (46th Ayrshire, New Cumnock)
- John Cunningham (50th Glasgow)
- Roy Snell
- Stanley (Sam) Smart DSO DFC (1987)
- Simon Pickett (DC, Berkshire County)
- Pauline Peace (Rama) (Dosthill) https://supportstaffordshire.org.uk/inspirational-leader-is-given-highest-award-in-scouting/
- Colin Illman
- Graham Burrell (Farsley, West Leeds)
