= Yamanaka Scout Camp =

ボーイスカウト日本連盟 山中野営場/山中ボーイスカウトキャンプ
- August 19–20, 2017 final camp

- J. S. Wilson and Michiharu Mishima, Chief Scout of Japan, at the national training camp at Lake Yamanaka, December 1952
- Owner: Scout Association of Japan
- Location: 〒401-0500 山梨県南都留郡山中湖村旭日丘 Minamitsuru District, Yamanashi
- Country: Japan
- Founded: 1925
- Defunct: Late August 2017
- Founder: Tsuneha Sano
- Website; Yamanaka Scout Camp (in Japanese)

Yamanaka Scout Camp ボーイスカウト日本連盟山中野営場 (Bōi Sukauto Nippon Renmei Yamanaka Yaeijō; Scout Association of Japan Yamanaka Facility) was the mountainous national Scout training camp of the Scout Association of Japan, located in Minamitsuru District, Yamanashi, near Lake Yamanaka, near the base of Mount Fuji in Yamanashi Prefecture. Yamanaka campsite was established at the end of the Taishō era for training Scout leaders. The 1,000 meter altitude, quiet campground is surrounded by the acorn-bearing Quercus mongolica (mizunara) and larch on a northward slope of about 72,732 square meters, (roughly 18 acres) which gently drops towards Lake Yamanaka.

== Background ==
In 1924, Japan fielded a full contingent of 25 to the 2nd World Scout Jamboree in Denmark. Tsuneha Sano was a participant, during which time he attended a Wood Badge course at Gilwell Park, marking the watershed for the first period of Japanese Scouting. In 1925 Sano returned to Japan and created Japan's own training course at Lake Yamanaka, called Jisshu-sho, for both Cub and Scout leaders, which is still used to this day, after completion of two preliminary courses, Koshu-kai and Kenshu-kai. Count Sano discovered clean water there, opened a camp and a leaders training center, which after World War II became a national practical training center, with special training for Fuji Scouts, base camp for hiking Mount Fuji, and year-round camping for Scouts from across Japan and abroad.

However, the land was leased from Yamanashi Prefecture, and expenditures for upkeep on the site exceeded income. Various studies and negotiations were conducted for several years, and the SAJ established the Yamanaka Camp Site Review Committee. SAJ examined whether Yamanaka campsite should be closed or how it could be renovated, and sought all avenues for maintaining the camp, and negotiated with the various parties concerned, but due to the aging building, the problem of asbestos, the cost of rebuilding, and in consideration of financial problems, the Review Committee reported to the Board of Directors held on October 11, 2016. SAJ decided to close down Yamanaka campsite in August 2017. The period necessary for dismantlement work and disposal equipment in order to complete removal of buildings and return the site to Yamanashi Prefecture after inspection is estimated as the end of March 2018.

By 2017, Yamanaka campsite was only available to SAJ-organized events and leaders' training courses. The final farewell camp was held August 19–20, 2017.

Yamanashi prefecture has already leased the site of Camp Yamanaka, to Fujikyu Estimate, Ltd, in 2017, for an 80-year contract, to be converted into area of exclusive villas.

Camp Yamanaka was replaced in August 2017 by Takahagi Scout Camp, (高荻ボーイスカウトキャンプ) a new campsite for the Scout Association of Japan, after the closure of Yamanaka campsite, in Takahagi, Ibaraki on the Pacific coast.

== See also ==
- Cradle of Liberty Council v. City of Philadelphia
