= Sano Tsuneha =

Japanese admiral (1871–1956)

Count Sano Tsuneha
- 佐野 常羽
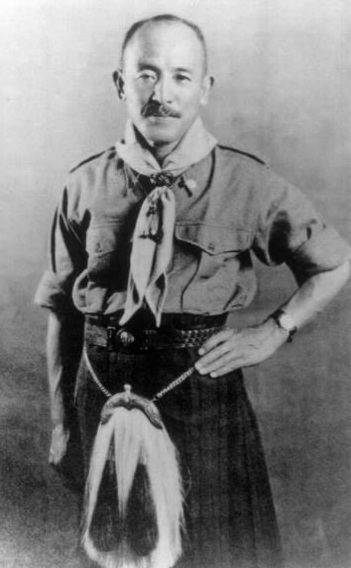
- Sano Tsuneha in Scouting uniform
- Born: June 3, 1871; Tokyo, Japan
- Died: January 25, 1956 (aged 84)
- Military career
- Allegiance: Empire of Japan
- Branch: Imperial Japanese Navy
- Service years: 1891–1920
- Rank: Rear Admiral
- Commands: Tsugaru; Haruna
- Conflicts: Boxer Rebellion; Russo-Japanese War; World War I

Count Sano Tsuneha (佐野 常羽; 3 July 1871 – 25 January 1956) was a Japanese admiral in the Imperial Japanese Navy in World War I. He is also noted for his association with the early Scouting movement in Japan.

== Biography ==
=== Early years ===
Sano was born in the Kōjimachi district of Tokyo. His father, Count Sano Tsunetami, was the founder of the Japanese Red Cross Society.

Sano was a graduate of the 18th class of the Imperial Japanese Naval Academy in 1891. He was ranked 20th in a class of 61 cadets. Sano performed his midshipman training on the corvettes Hiei and Musashi, and the cruiser Itsukushima. On commissioning to sub-lieutenant, he was assigned to the corvette Kohei and cruisers Naniwa, Matsushima, Saien and Tatsuta. After his promotion to lieutenant in 1897, he was sent to southern China during the height of the Boxer Rebellion of 1900-1901. On his return to Japan, he served on the cruisers Izumo and Asama.

=== Count ===
On the death of his father on 26 December 1902, he succeeded to the title of count (hakushaku) in the kazoku peerage. From 1903-1904, he served as chief gunnery officer on the cruiser Izumi.

Following Sano's promotion to lieutenant commander in 1904, he was assigned as aide-de-camp to Prince Yamashina Kikumaro for the duration of the Russo-Japanese War. After the war, he served in a number of staff positions, and was assigned as executive officer to the submarine tender Toyohashi in 1908. Promoted to commander in 1908, he was appointed naval attaché to Germany from 1911-1914. While living in Germany, Sano made frequent trips to England, where he became acquainted with the Scouting movement.

=== World War I ===
With the outbreak of World War I, Sano returned to Japan to assume command of the cruiser Tsugaru. From 1916-1917, he was the Chief of Staff of the Chinkai Guard District in Korea. In 1917, he became captain of the battleship Haruna. He was promoted to rear admiral on 1 December 1919. Sano went into the reserves from August 1920.

=== Scout Jamboree ===
In 1924, Japan fielded a full contingent of 25 to the 2nd World Scout Jamboree in Denmark. Sano was a participant, during which time he attended a Wood Badge course at Gilwell Park, marking the watershed for the first period of Japanese Scouting. Sano returned to Japan and created Japan's own training course at Lake Yamanaka, near the base of Mount Fuji, called Jisshu-sho, for both Cub and Scout leaders. The course is still used to this day, after completion of two preliminary courses, Koshu-kai and Kenshu-kai.

Sano then attended the 3rd World Scout Jamboree in the United Kingdom, and received the Silver Wolf award from Baden-Powell in 1931. The only other person to receive the Silver Wolf in Japan was Emperor Shōwa. Sano was given the title of "Elder" by the National Scout Association of Japan in 1954, and was given the highest award of the NSAJ, the Kijishō, in 1955. He died the next year on January 25, 1956 at the age of 84.
