= Takahagi Scoutfield =

「大和の森」高萩スカウトフィールド
- Owner: Scout Association of Japan
- Location: 〒318-0104, Nakadogawa 412, Takahagi-shi, Ibaraki-ken Telephone 03-5805-2561 Fax 03-5805-2901 E-mail scoutfield@scout.or.jp
- Country: Japan
- Founded: 2012
- Website; Takahagi Scoutfield (in Japanese)

Takahagi Scoutfield (「大和の森」高萩スカウトフィールド "Yamato no Mori" Takahagi Sukautofierudo, "Yamato no Mori" Takahagi Scoutfield) is an educational camp facility owned and managed by the Scout Association of Japan, located in Takahagi, Ibaraki, near the Pacific coast. Takahagi Scoutfield replaced Yamanaka Scout Camp at the end of August 2017 for training Scout leaders. The 350–515-metre (1,148–1,690 ft) altitude campsite is surrounded by forests on about 2.7 square kilometres (670 acres) about 13 kilometres (8.1 mi) from JR Takahagi Station.

== Background ==
In 2012, the Scout Association of Japan received a donation of vast forests of approximately 2.7 square kilometers in Takahagi, Ibaraki Prefecture, from Daiwa House. Permanent facilities include an Administrative Building with accommodations for 44 people, dining room/kitchen, meeting room, training room; an outdoor auditorium of 200 square metres (2,200 sq ft) that seats about 100 people; a tent campsite with accommodations for about 800 people and about 50 campfire places available; a communal plaza (Hiroba 広場), and an outdoor arena stage.

Yamanaka Scout Camp was superseded in August 2017 by Takahagi Scoutfield, after the closure of Yamanaka Scout Camp. It is open to local schools, youth groups, and educational organizations within Ibaraki Prefecture.
