= William de Bois Maclaren =

Scottish publisher and Scouting pioneer (1856–1921)

William de Bois MacLaren
- Director of Rubber Estate Agency
- Born: William Frederick MacLaren; 17 November 1856; Glasgow, Scotland
- Died: 3 June 1921 (aged 64)
- Occupation: Publisher
- Known for: Donation of Gilwell Park to The Scout Association

William Frederick de Bois MacLaren (17 November 1856 – 3 June 1921) was publisher, businessman and Scout Commissioner for Rosneath, Dunbartonshire, Scotland. He is most recognized as the first major benefactor of Scouting by donating Gilwell Park in 1919.

== Publisher, expert in rubber ==
Frontispiece of The Rubber Tree Book, published 1913, MacLaren and Sons, London

William Frederick de Bois MacLaren was born on 17 November 1856, in Blythswood, Glasgow in Scotland, as the son of Walter Gray McLaren (Master Printer, sometimes misspelt as painter) and Caroline Amelia De Bois, from France. He had an elder sister, Margaret Ann Aitken McLaren (born 25 April 1855), and younger brothers: Walter Gray (born 14 April 1858, who attended Glasgow University, was ordained in 1885 in New Zealand where he lived until 1903, and died (1916 in Glasgow), Charles (born 19 November 1859) and John (born 28 June 1861).

By the beginning of the 20th century, MacLaren and Frank Copeman were sole partners of MacLaren & Sons Ltd, 37–38 Shoe Lane, London, in the Fleet Street neighbourhood, who were publishers or publishers' agents of industrial books and magazines, such as The Brick and Pottery Trades Journal, and Ceylon Observer, and publishers of household titles, under the name of The British Baker, such as All About Pastries. One of their periodicals was the India Rubber Journal, the leading publication for the flourishing rubber industry in the beginning of the 20th century, with Sir Herbert Wright as editor for the period 1907–1917. Copeman and MacLaren founded in 1906 the Rubber Estate Agency. It was the first UK company for the specific purpose of financing the acquisition of rubber estates and of acting as secretaries and agents of rubber and other plantation companies. With this expertise in the rubber industry, MacLaren wrote and published The Rubber Tree Book (MacLaren and Sons, London, 1913, 384 pages), about technology and business administration of rubber plantations. In 1919, the Rubber Estate Agency was sold to the Belgium company Societé Internationale de Plantations et de Finance (SIPEF). The R.E.A. company still exists, and was worth approximately GBP 37 million in 2010.

MacLaren wrote several other books including Climbs and Changes, Chuckles from a Cheery Corner, and Word Pictures of War (a book of poetry based on experiences of the First World War, published by Methuen, London, in 1917). He died on 3 June 1921. Posthumously in 1922, his Child's Song-Story Book was published for private circulation by Blackie & Son, Glasgow.

== Scouting ==
On the recommendation of P.B. Nevill, acting on behalf of Baden-Powell, MacLaren purchased the 53 acre Gilwell Hall estate near Epping Forest near the town of Chingford for GBP 7,000, and presented it as Gilwell Park to the Scout Association in July 1919. For reference, the GBP 7,000 in 1919 equals GBP £314.357 in 2025 value. MacLaren also paid another GBP 3,000 to help put the White House into good repair, as the place had been abandoned for the previous 14 years and was virtually derelict. When Gilwell Park was officially opened on 26 July 1919 Mrs MacLaren cut ribbons in Scout colours (green and yellow) that were hung across the doorway to the White House to mark the opening. Baden-Powell then presented MacLaren with the Silver Wolf as a sign of the great debt that the Movement owed to him.

In MacLaren's honour the Gilwell staff wore the MacLaren neckerchief, made of MacLaren tartan. However to reduce the expense, a scarf of dove grey cloth (the colour of humility) with a warm red lining (to signify warmth of feeling) was substituted with only a patch of MacLaren tartan on the point of the scarf and worn by those passing the Gilwell practical course. In 1924 use of the scarf became restricted to Wood Badge holders only. Today the scarf is more the earth tone colour beige than grey.
