= Kenneth H. Stevens =

Kenneth H. Stevens CBE, DL

Chief Executive Commissioner of the Scout Association

Kenneth Henry Stevens, CBE, DL (8 October 1922 – 18 November 2005) served as the Chief Executive Commissioner of the Scout Association, Camp Chief's Deputy at Gilwell Park, and the Executive Commissioner of the 2nd World Scout Indaba held in June, 1957 to mark the centenary of the birth of Robert Baden-Powell, 1st Baron Baden-Powell, the founder of Scouting.,

In 1976, Stevens was awarded the 113th Bronze Wolf, the only distinction of the World Organization of the Scout Movement, awarded by the World Scout Committee for exceptional services to world Scouting.
