= Daiwa House =

Japanese homebuilder

Daiwa House Industry Co, Ltd. 大和ハウス工業株式会社
- Type: Public (K.K)
- Traded as: TYO: 1925; TOPIX Large 70 Component; TOPIX 100 Component; Nikkei 225 Component
- Industry: Construction; Real estate
- Founded: April 5, 1955; 71 years ago
- Headquarters: 3-3-5 Umeda, Kita-ku, Osaka 530-8241, Japan
- Key people: Takeo Higuchi, (CEO and Chairman); Naotake Ohno, (COO and President); Nobuo Ishibashi (Founder)
- Services: Design and construction of residential, commercial and institutional buildings and health care facilities; Renting and leasing of real estate; Operation of resort hotels, golf courses, fitness clubs and health care facilities
- Revenue: $37.371 billion USD (FY 2019)
- Net income: ▲$ 705.042 million USD (FY 2012) (¥ 66.274 billion JPY) (FY 2012)
- Owner: The Master Trust Bank of Japan (9.70%); Japan Trustee Services Bank (5.92%); Odakyu (0.19%); Kanagawa Chuo Kotsu (0.01%)
- Number of employees: 44,947
- Subsidiaries: 92
- Website: Official website

Daiwa House Industry Co., Ltd. (大和ハウス工業株式会社, Daiwa Hausu Kōgyō Kabushiki-gaisha) is Japanese multinational construction company that specializing in prefabricated houses. The company is also engaged in the construction of factories, shopping centers, health care facilities, the management and operation of resort hotels, golf courses and fitness clubs. It is one of the largest construction company in Japan. Daiwa House also operates as a sales agency for HAL robot suits.

Daiwa House is also one of Japan's largest owner and operator of freight logistics centers, with over 250 logistics properties under management, and further expansion planned in this business segment.

The company was founded in 1955 in Osaka and is listed on the Tokyo Stock Exchange and Osaka Securities Exchange, being a constituent of the TOPIX and Nikkei 225 stock indices.

In 2012, the Scout Association of Japan received a donation of a large forest of approximately 2.7 square kilometers in Takahagi, Ibaraki Prefecture from Daiwa. Permanent facilities include an Administrative Building with accommodations for 44 people, dining room/kitchen, meeting room, training room; an outdoor auditorium of 200 m² that seats about 100 people; a tent campsite with accommodations for about 800 people and about 50 campfire places available; a communal plaza (Hiroba 広場), and an outdoor arena stage.

== Gallery ==
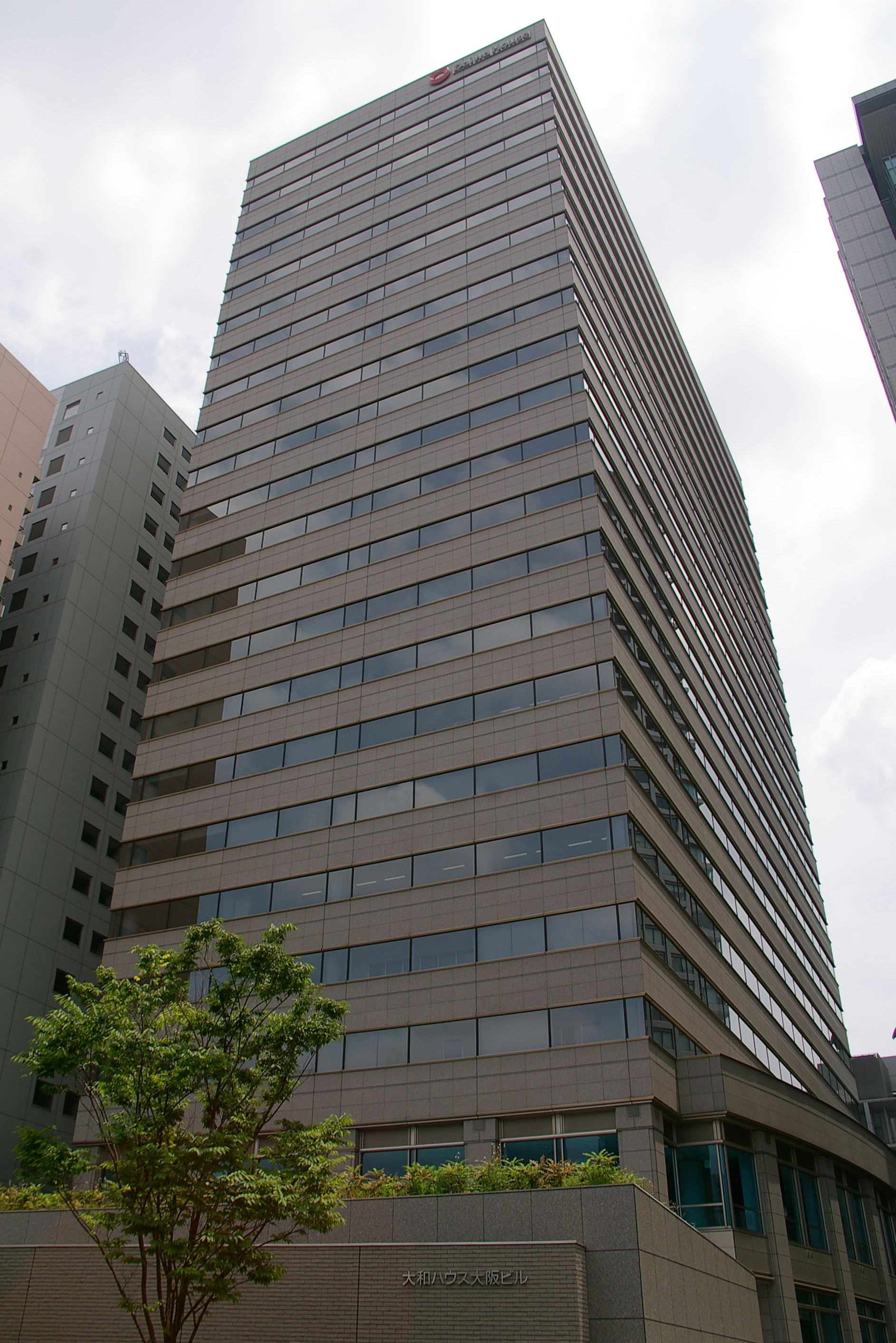
The company's headquarters in Osaka

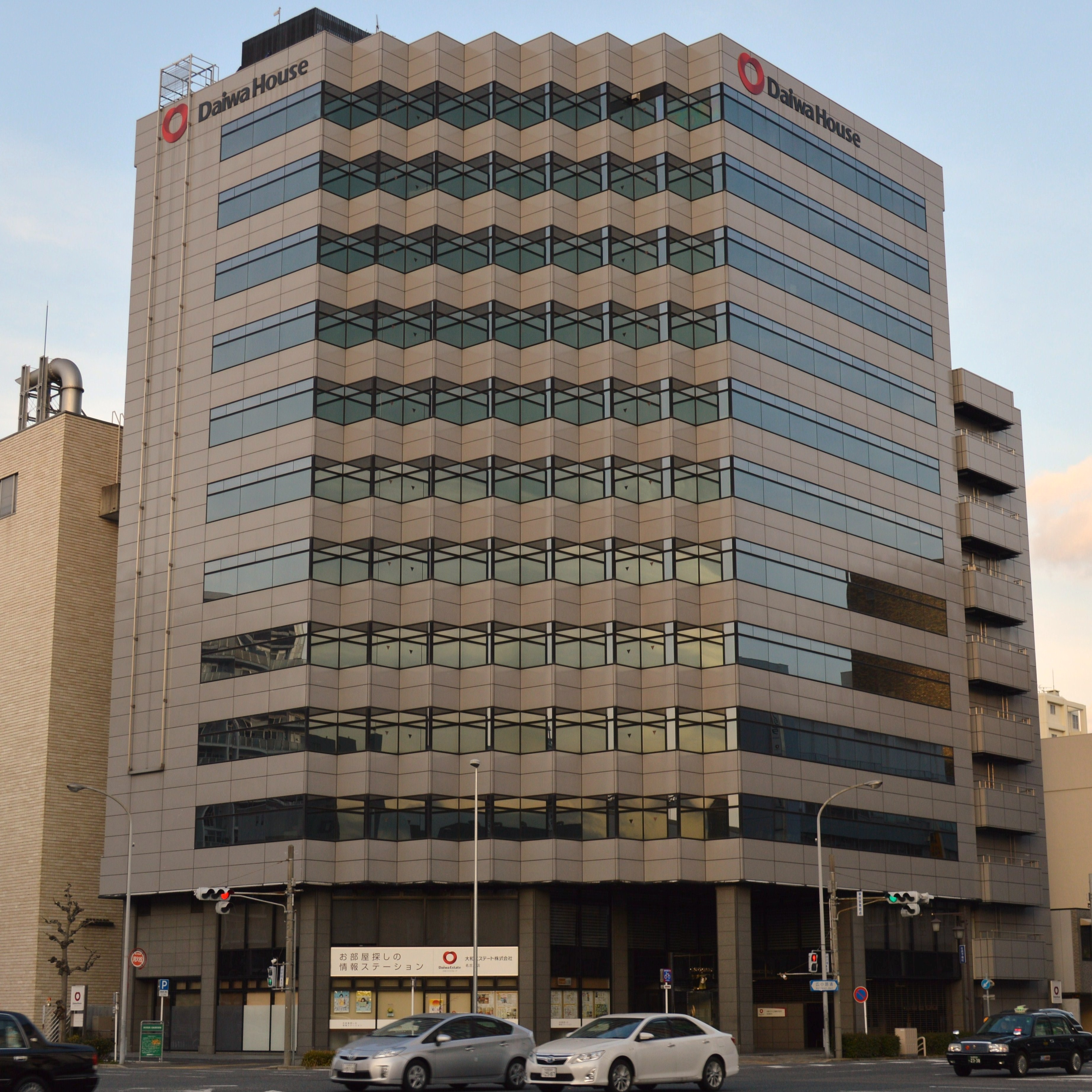
Nagoya branch office building

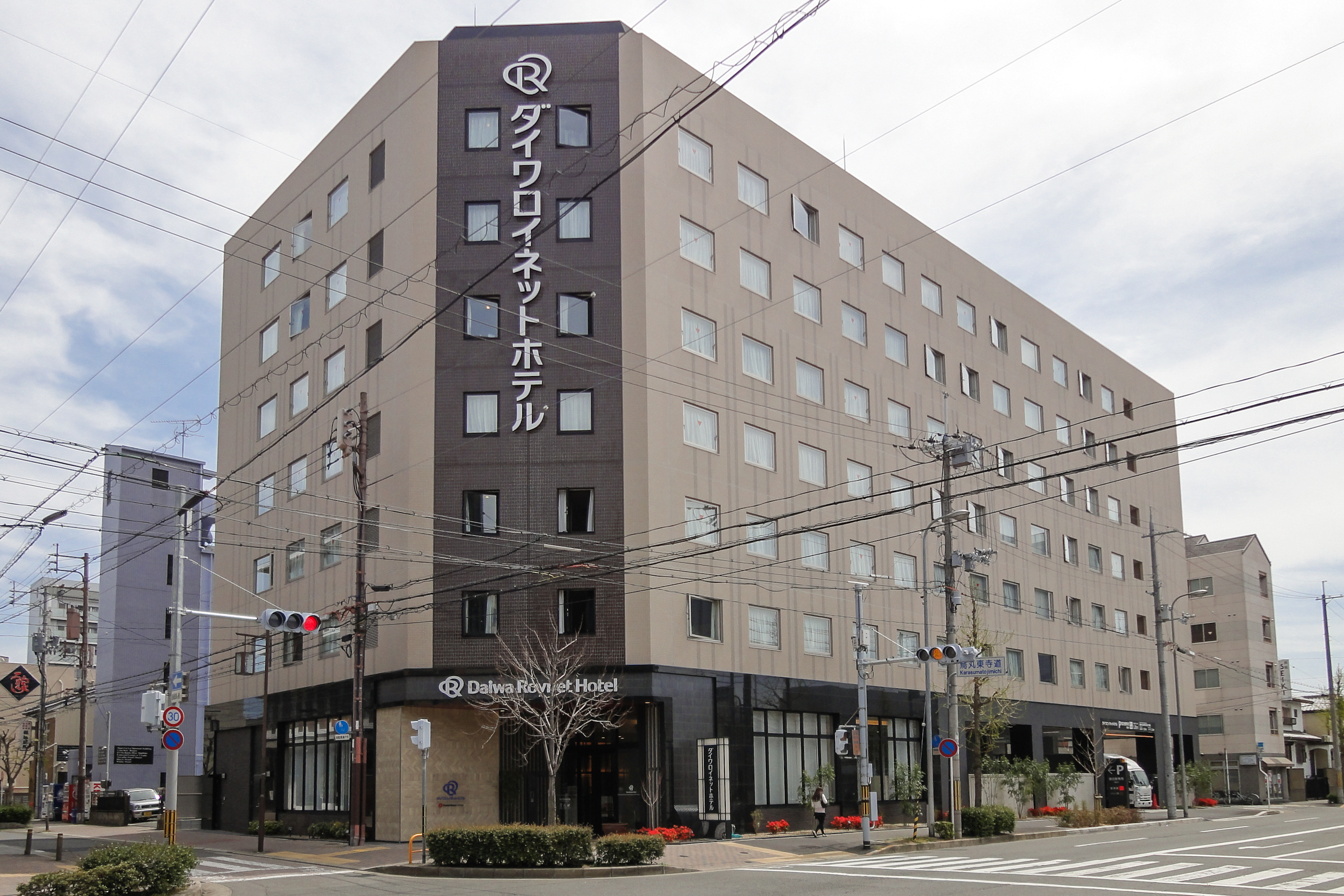
Daiwa Roynet Hotel in Kyoto
