= Alec Spalding =

British scout leader

Alec J. Spalding
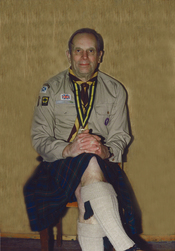
- Born: 9 August 1923; Middlesex, England
- Died: 2 October 2007 (aged 84); Gartnavel General Hospital, Glasgow, Scotland
- Occupations: radar operator agricultural economist
- Known for: Scouting

Alec J. Spalding MBE (9 August 1923 – 2 October 2007) was a prominent figure in the UK Scout Association, serving in the 24th Glasgow (Bearsden) Scout Group for over fifty years. In recognition of his service to Scouting, he received the Silver Wolf and was appointed a Member of the Order of the British Empire. He died of cancer at age 84.

== History ==
=== Education ===
Spalding attended Glasgow Academy, and went on to study Agriculture at the University of Glasgow. His studies were interrupted by his military service, but were resumed after the war. He graduated with a BSc in 1948.

=== Military service ===
Spalding volunteered to join the Royal Navy in the early 1940s and served as a radar operator in the North Atlantic and Pacific Oceans through the rest of World War II until being demobilized in 1946.

=== Career ===
After graduation, Spalding worked as an agricultural economist at the West of Scotland Agricultural College from 1948 to about 1954. He went on to work at Scottish Agricultural Industries until taking early retirement in 1981.

=== Involvement with Scouting ===
Spalding was a Boy Scout with the 24th Glasgow (Bearsden) Scout Group, and in 1939 he was awarded the King Scout Badge. He returned after military service in 1946, and took up a series of leadership positions over the course of more than fifty years, including Scout Leader (leading "A" Troop), Scouter in Charge (acting Group Scout Leader of the 24th), and District Commissioner.

After visiting Kandersteg, Switzerland in 1947, he took a party of 36 Scouts and leaders to the Kandersteg International Scout Centre in 1949. This commenced a tradition of biennial visits to Kandersteg by Scouts from the 24th Glasgow (Bearsden) Scout Group.

Notable features of these camps during the golden years of the group in the 1960s included serious mountain expeditions. Excursions over the Gemmi and Lotschen Passes were regularly undertaken. On top of this was a high level expedition involving an overnight stay in a mountain chalet allowing access to a number of Bernese Oberland peaks including the Rinderhorn and the Balmhorn above 11,000'.

Spalding also organised numerous other expeditions across Europe and North America.

Spalding's Scouting activities also included running the group's biennial jumble sale. He was also a keen photographer, and often contributed pictures and text about scout activities to the local paper.

Spalding was also known for his enthusiastic rendition of songs like Three Blind Mice, Sing a Song of Sixpence, Ging Gang Goolie, Green Grow the Rushes, O, and The Wild Rover at camp fires.

== List of works ==
- The 24th 1908–1988: a history of the 24th Glasgow (Bearsden) Scout Group, May 1988, ISBN 0-9513439-0-4
- Activities and Expeditions for Youth Groups, 2007
- Games and Activities for Scouts, 1985 (reprinted 1996), ISBN 0-85174-502-4

== See also ==
- Bearsden
- Scouting in Greater Glasgow
