= 10th World Scout Jamboree =

1959 event in the Philippines

- Theme: Building Tomorrow Today
- Country: Philippines
- Coordinates: 14.1323399°N 121.1918928°E
- Date: 1959
- Attendance: 12,203 Scouts
Previous; 9th World Scout Jamboree, England	Next; 11th World Scout Jamboree, Greece

The 10th World Scout Jamboree was held from 17–26 July 1959 and was hosted by the Philippines at Mount Makiling, Los Baños, Laguna. Dubbed "The Bamboo Jamboree" due to the prevalence of bamboo and nipa palm. There were a total 12,203 Scouts from 44 countries. The theme was "Building Tomorrow Today". It was the first World Scout Jamboree to be held in Asia, and as well outside Europe and Canada.

== Memorable Facts ==
- Carlos Polestico Garcia, President of the Republic of the Philippines spoke at the opening.
- Attendees of the event included:

- Daniel Charles Spry, Director of the Boy Scouts World Bureau.
- Thomas Godfrey Polson Corbett, the 2nd Baron Rowallan of Rowallan, third Chief Scout of the British territories.

- BSP President Jorge Bartolomé Vargas received the Bronze Wolf.
- The jamboree logo featured a Filipino salakót.
- The Manila firm of Charles W. Miller Sons Studio took formal photographic portraits of a representative Scout from each of the national contingents.
- The BSA contingent was led by Arthur Aloys Schuck (1895-1963), Chief Scout Executive (1948–60).

== The Tenth World Jamboree Song ==
From every clime and region, we crossed mount, vale, and sea
We're in the Philippines now for our World Jamboree.
Here East and West are meeting, as Heaven so decrees
We live and work and play in true fellowship and peace.
Mabuhay to all Scouts who are here
Let the message of BP now resound loud, long, and clear.
I am your brother and friend, so take my hand
For God and Country, Mankind and Scouting
We shall stand, forever stand.

== Participation ==
- Australia: 19.
- Austria: 3.
- Belgium: 3.
- Brunei: 16.
- Burma: 1.
- Cambodia: 17.
- Canada: 93.
- Ceylon: 22.
- Taiwan: 545.
- Denmark: 2.
- Fiji: 1.
- Finland 6.
- France & associates: 81.
- West Germany: 1.
- Greece: 12.
- Hong Kong: 62.
- India: 14.
- Indonesia: 73.
- Irān: 4.
- Ireland: 2.
- Israel: 3.
- Italy: 3.
- Japan: 519.
- South Korea: 121.
- Kuwait: 19.
- Laos: 21.
- Federation of Malaya: 122.
- Netherlands: 6.
- New Guinea: 4.
- New Zealand: 15.
- North Borneo: 12.
- Norway: 2.
- Pakistan: 11.
- Philippines: 7863.
- Sarawak: 8.
- Singapore: 31.
- Sweden: 35.
- Switzerland: 9.
- Thailand: 54.
- United Arab Republic: 7.
- United Kingdom: 112.
- United States of America: 309.
- Venezuela: 1.
- South Vietnam: 59.
- Scouts-in-Exile (Estonia, Hungary, Lithuania, Poland, Ukraine and Russia): 23.
