= P. B. Nevill =

English scout official

- Born: Percy Bantock Nevill; 14 June 1887; Stamford Hill, London, United Kingdom
- Died: 30 July 1975 (aged 88); Surrey, England
- Occupation: Financial accountant (FCA)
- Known for: The Boy Scouts Association's Headquarters Commissioner and vice-president

Percy Bantock Nevill OBE FCA (1887–1975), known as P. B. Nevill, was an early scoutmaster in the Boy Scout Movement, and The Boy Scouts Association of the United Kingdom Headquarters Commissioner and, later, vice-president.

== Personal ==
Nevill was born on 14 June 1887 in Stamford Hill in the London Borough of Hackney, England. His parents were John ("Jack") Nevill and Alice Maria Bantock. He was trained as a financial accountant. In 1914 after the outbreak of war, he volunteered for the army but was refused on health grounds. He married Joan Woodruffe in June 1926. He died in England on 30 July 1975.

== Scouting ==
Nevill was impressed by the September 1909 Crystal Palace Rally of Scouts in London and he established and was the scoutmaster of the 5th Enfield Boy Scout troop. He helped establish and was a warden and trustee of Roland House Boy Scout settlement. He was instrumental in the donation of Gilwell Park to The Boy Scouts Association and, in 1958, he funded the Troop Room at Gilwell Park. In 1948 he donated 37 acres (15 ha) of cliff land adjoining the sea in Kingsdown, Kent to create the Kingsdown Boy Scout Camp. He contributed to Scouting publications, translation of scouting publications and wrote two books on Scouting, My Scouting Story (1960) and Scouting in London (1966)

=== The Boy Scouts Association appointments ===
The Boy Scouts Association appointed him as a district commissioner for East London in 1916, and then a county commissioner. He was the association's headquarters commissioner for kindred societies, to liaise with other organisations, from 1914 until 1949, at the same time as he held other commissionerships and roles. He was also as the association's headquarters commissioner for Rovers from 1920 to 1930, when he resigned to focus on his other commissionerships. In 1926, the association awarded him its Silver Wolf. In the early 1960s, when he ended his commissionerships, the association appointed him as a vice president. He disagreed with changes implemented following the 1966 The Chief Scout's Advance Party Report, particularly the discontinuation of Rovers and resigned all his active positions with the association but was made honorary commissioner for life. When he died in 1975, he was the last of Baden-Powell's contemporaries in The Scout Association headquarters and council.

=== Roland House ===
In 1916, Nevill moved into Roland House Boy Scout Settlement, at 29 Stepney Green, East London as its warden. The house was the legacy of Roland Philipps who was killed in action in the 1914-18 World War. Roland House and its Scout Shop were maintained by its wardens, Rovers and resident Boy Scout leaders. William de Bois Maclaren was a guest of Nevill's at Roland House, which was decisive in De Boise Maclaren's donation of Gilwell Park to The Boy Scouts Association. In 1920, Nevill took over the full lease for Roland House and all financial responsibility. Upon his marriage in 1926, he moved out of Roland House to Reigate, Surrey. He remained on the Roland House committee until the 1960s. Roland House was closed by The Scout Association soon after Nevill's death.

=== Rovers ===
Rovers held Nevill's attention and support from the 1920s, soon after its beginning and The Boy Scouts Association appointed him as its headquarters commissioner for Rovers. He organised the first jamboree for Rovers (which Baden-Powell termed a "moot"). He organised several more moots. After resigning as The Boy Scouts Association headquarters commissioner for Rovers in 1930, he remained involved with Rovers and attended further moots. In 1966, when The Boy Scouts Association discontinued Rovers following The Chief Scout's Advance Party Report, Nevill resigned all his active positions with the association.

== Selected works ==
- The Doctor and the Outlaw, Etc. [A Tableau], 1922
- Contributions to translations of Rovering to Success by Baden-Powell, in many languages, including Czech, German and Dutch
- My Scouting Story, London: Roland House Scout Settlement, 1960, 228 pp.
- Scouting in London 1908–1965, London: The Trustees of the London Scout Council (1913–1965), 1966, 213 pp.
