= Louis-Clément Picalausa =

- Photographer: Alfred Daems / Place: Villers-la-Ville (Chevlipont) (Belgium) / date: 1967
- Born: 17 April 1898
- Died: 19 November 1969 (aged 71)
- Other names: Totem: Plume de flèche
- Occupation: Novelist
- Known for: One of Belgium's first Scouts

Louis-Clément Picalausa (17 April 1898 – 19 November 1969) was one of Belgium's first Scouts and a Scout novelist, chief scout of the Boy-Scouts van België until 1940. The landscape of the Belgian Ardennes inspired him in the writing of his scout novels.

== Background ==
His parents nicknamed him "the man of the woods." He was already camping by 1912, and was Scoutmaster of the 1st Seraing Scout Group in 1919, and became Deputy Camp Chief and Akela (national Cub Scout leader, National Commissioner in 1929, then Chief Scout of the Boy Scouts of Belgium until 1940. He received the Silver Wolf Award from Lord Baden-Powell in 1937.

In 1923 he was Director of Publications of the Belgian Red Cross, where he had created the first aid courses for young people. Seriously wounded in World War II as a cavalry officer, he was at that time professionally Secretary General of the Belgian Red Cross. He founded the Red Cross Cadets in 1942. He later became Deputy Director General of the organization.

== Works ==
- Zi et Za – Histoires pour les enfants de 9 à 99, Édition La Flamme, 1935
- Aventure – (d'apres St. Ed. White), Coll. Autour du feu 1945. Casterman
- Les Aubes Sauvage. Casterman
- Les Chasseures de Mammouths, Coll. Autour du feu. Casterman
- Les Yeux de la Jungle, Coll. Autour du feu. Casterman
- Le Sel de la Mer – (d'après deux légendes norvégiennes), Coll. Autour du feu. Casterman
- L'Enfant des Bêtes – (Introduction de S.A. le prince Albert de Ligne.), Coll. Autour du feu. Casterman
- Framboh – (chronique du Sapin Vert), Coll. Autour du feu. Casterman
- Les Aubes sauvages, Coll. Le Rameau Vert. Casterman
- Sur la piste du Sapin Vert, Coll. Le Rameau Vert. Casterman
- Ceux du Sapin Vert, Coll. Le Rameau Vert. Casterman
- Zi et Za de la jungle, Coll. Le Rameau Vert. Casterman, 1945
