= Glad Bincham =

British non-profit official

International Conference of the Boy Scout Movement Chief International Scout Commissioner
- In office 1944–1956

Thomas Gladstone "Glad" Bincham was the International Conference of the Boy Scout Movement's Chief International Scout Commissioner from 1944 to 1956, as well as The Boy Scouts Association of the United Kingdom International Commissioner, and played a major role in the resumption of Scouting in Europe after World War II. He was an industrialist in the stationery industry.

Bincham and A.W. Hurll, then The Boy Scouts Association's General Secretary, visited Belgium, the Netherlands, Luxembourg and France in October 1945. They made contacts with the leaders of the Scout Movement in these countries and learned of how Scouting had played a part during the occupation and how it proposed to meet the future. In Luxembourg, they were received by Robert Schaffner, the Scout Commissioner, who had been elected mayor of the ruined town of Echternach the day before and was already drawing up plans for its reconstruction.

In 1957, Bincham was awarded the International Conference of the Boy Scout Movement's 13th Bronze Wolf, its only distinction, for exceptional services to world Scouting.
