= Fred Hurll =

The Boy Scouts Association Chief Executive Commissioner

Alfred William "Fred" Hurll CVO CBE (1905–1991) was The Boy Scouts Association's General Secretary and then Chief Executive Commissioner.

== Background ==
Hurll and T. Glad Bincham visited post-war Belgium, the Netherlands, Luxembourg and France in October 1945. They made contacts with the leaders of the Scout Movement in these countries and learnt of how Scouting had played a part during the occupation and how it proposed to meet the future. In Luxembourg, they were received by Robert Schaffner, the Scout Commissioner, who had been elected mayor of the ruined town of Echternach the day before and was already drawing up plans for its reconstruction.

Hurll and John Frederick Colquhoun, the Boy Scouts Association Commissioner for Relations, were the organizers of the 1st World Scout Indaba (a gathering of Scout Leaders from around the world) which took place at Gilwell Park for a week in July 1952.

In 1957, Hurll was Deputy Camp Chief at the 9th World Scout Jamboree which was held at Sutton Park, Birmingham, England.

In 1966 Hurll was cited as being confident that the movement could reach one million members by 1975.

In 1969, Hurll was awarded the World Organization of the Scout Movement's 54th Bronze Wolf, its only distinction, for exceptional services to world Scouting.

== Works ==
- 1961: Hazlewood, Rex; Collis, Henry; Fred Hurll (1961). B-P's Scouts: an official history of The Boy Scouts Association. London: Colins. OCLC 17594720.
