= Gilwell Park =

Headquarters of The Scout Association in the United Kingdom

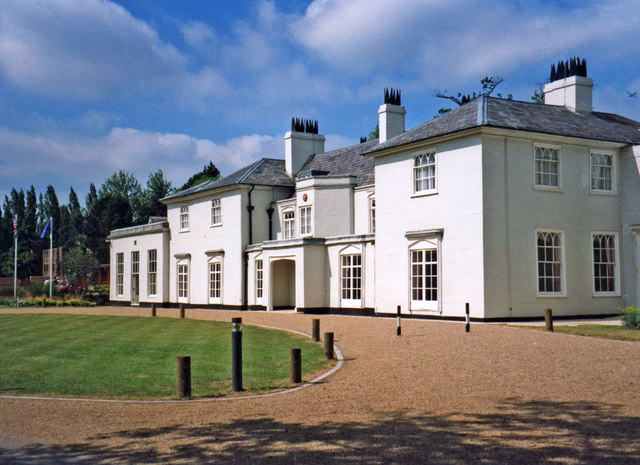

- Gilwell Park (England)
- Owner: The Scout Association
- Location: Waltham Abbey, London, E4 7QW
- Country: England
- Coordinates: 51°39′01″N 0°0′08″E
- Website www.scoutadventures.org.uk

Gilwell Park is the headquarters and principal camp site of The Scout Association in the United Kingdom. It is a 109-acre (44 ha) site on the northeastern outskirts of London, located within Epping Forest in the Sewardstonebury area of Waltham Abbey, near the border with Chingford.

It is used by Scout and Guide groups. Adult Scout leader training undertaken at Gilwell Park since 1919 is known as Wood Badge training. Scout leaders from many countries have trained at Gilwell Park and Wood Badge training was followed by some other Scout organisations, and, therefore, Gilwell Park has taken on importance to other Scout organisations.

Gilwell Park has a number of camping fields, indoor accommodation, historical sites, Scouting monuments and outdoor adventure activities. It can accommodate up to 10,000 people and regularly does so. It is also used by schools and other youth organisations and hosts social events such as weddings and birthday parties.

Gilwell Park is also host to Scout Adventures Gilwell Park, one of eight national centres run by or in partnership with The Scout Association, including Great Tower and Youlbury.

Gilwell Park was bought for The Boy Scouts Association in 1919, by one of its Scout commissioners, William de Bois Maclaren to provide camping facilities for London Scouts.

== History ==
=== Late Middle Ages to 18th century ===
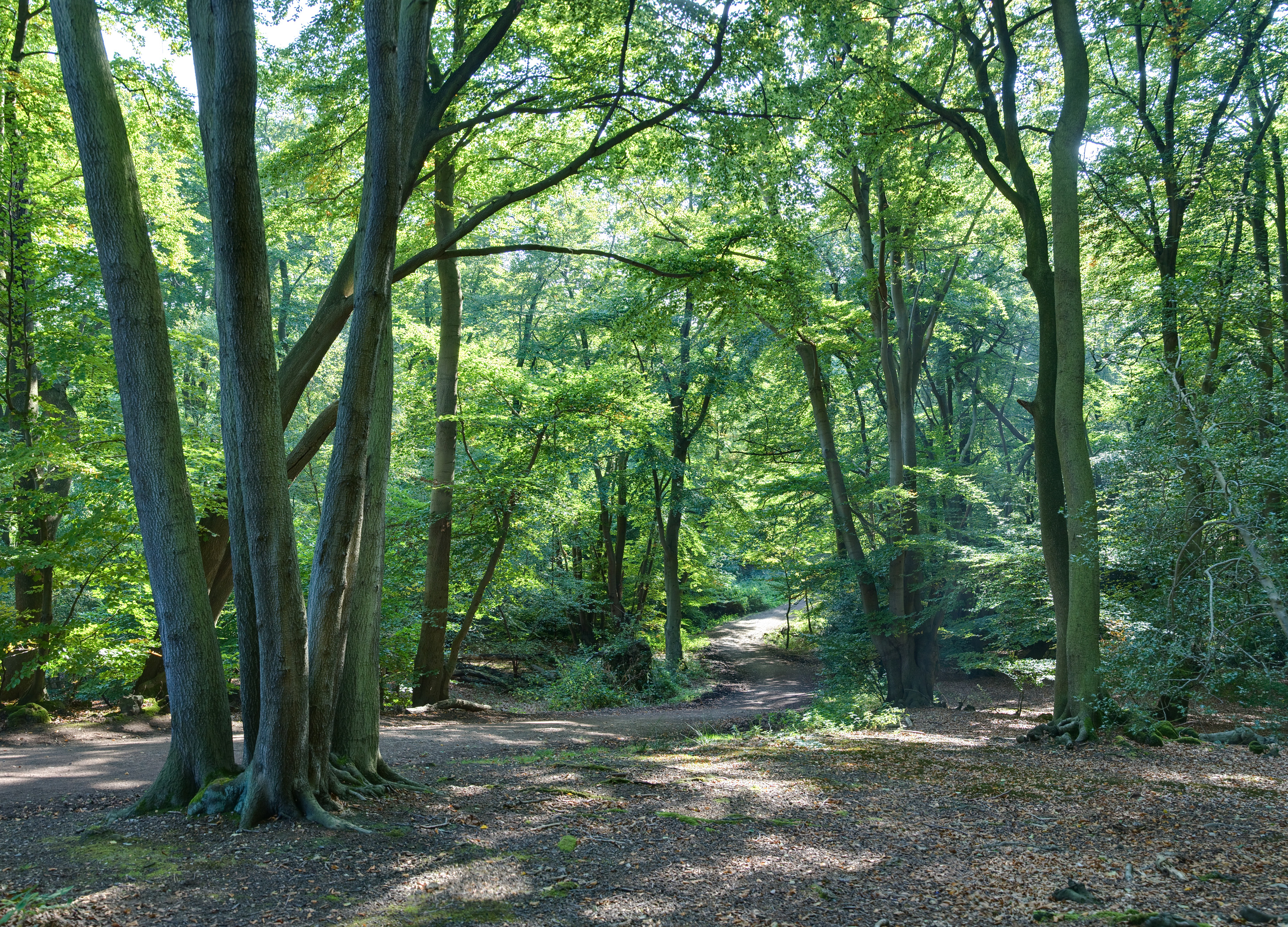
Epping Forest was a regular haunt of Dick Turpin.

The history of Gilwell Park can be traced to 1407, when John Crow owned Gyldiefords, the land that would become Gilwell Park. Between 1407 and 1422, Crow sold the land to Richard Rolfe and the area became known as Gillrolfes; "Gill" being Old English for glen. Following Rolfe's death in 1422, different sections of the property came to be called "Great Gilwell" and "Little Gilwell." The two areas were named after the Old English "wella" (spring). A farmhouse has stood at Gilwell Farm ever since.

Around this time, Richard Osbourne purchased an adjoining 5.6 ha (14 acres) property and in 1442, he built a large dwelling called Osborne Hall, which stood for 300 years. According to a local legend, in the early 16th century, King Henry VIII owned the land and built a hunting lodge for his son Prince Edward. Around 1736, highwayman Dick Turpin began using Gilwell's forests to hide and for ambushing travellers and freight along roads leading into London.^{[a]}

In 1754, William Skrimshire purchased Great Gilwell, Little Gilwell and half of Osborne's estate, including Osborne Hall. Skrimshire demolished Osborne Hall and built a new residence, which he also called Osborne Hall and is now called the White House. Timbers in the White House can be dated to this time but not to any previous era.^{[a]} Leonard Tresilian (?–1792) bought the estate in 1771 and expanded the land holdings and size of the residence.

After Tresilian's first wife Margaret Holland died young after bearing three daughters, he married Elizabeth Fawson. Desiring that Gilwell pass on to his eldest daughter, who was also named Margaret (1750 – c.1844), Tresilian drew up a detailed prenuptial agreement with Fawson's father. By the time of Tresilian's death in 1792, the younger Margaret had married William Bassett Chinnery (1766–1834), the elder brother of painter George Chinnery.

=== 18th century to early 20th century ===
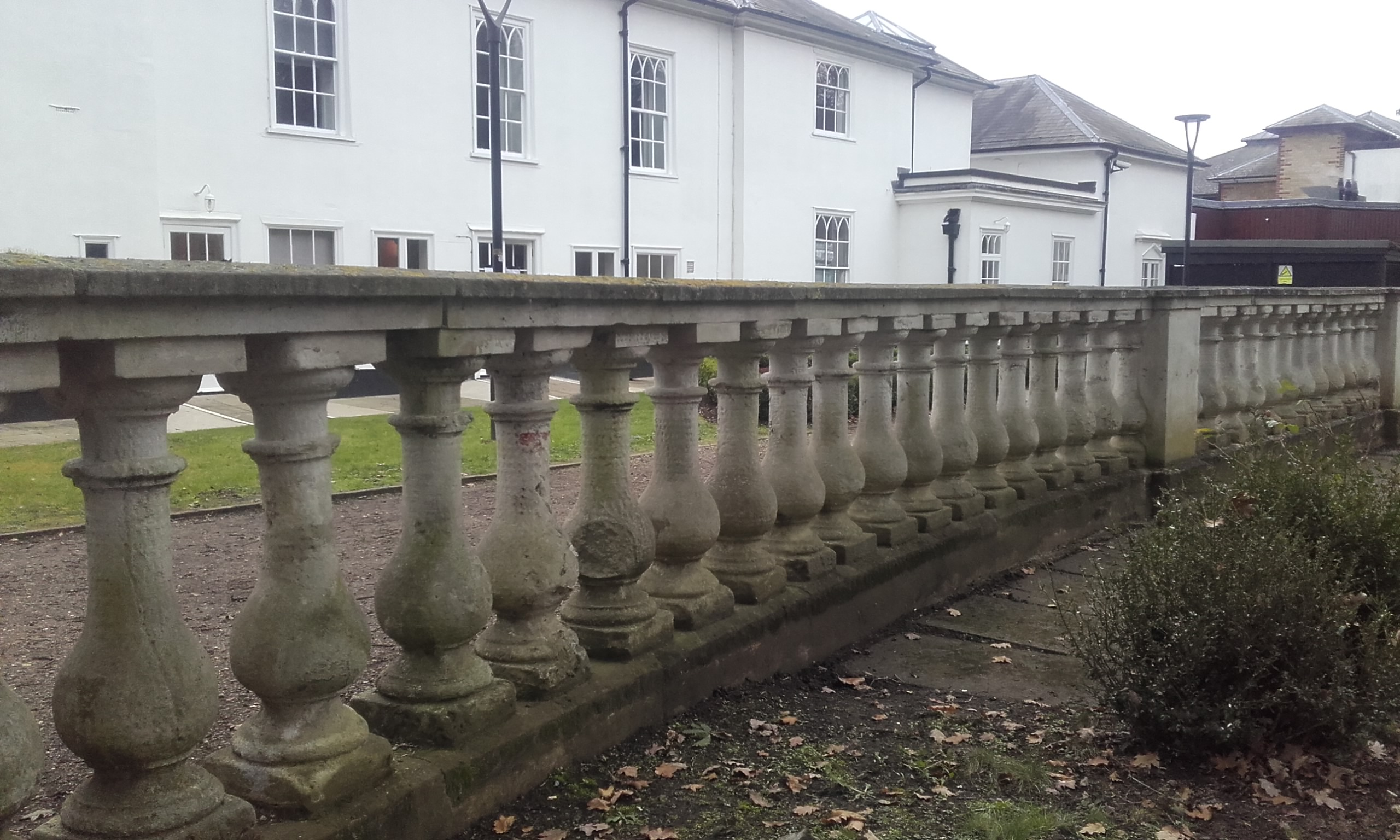
Old London Bridge balustrade at Gilwell Park

The Chinnerys were wealthy and influential. William Chinnery's father, who was also named William, owned trading ships and named one Gilwell in 1800. William and Margaret Chinnery initially lived in London and after three years of marriage they inherited Gilwell in 1792 and moved to the property in 1793. They soon shocked the populace by renaming Osborne Hall to "Gilwell Hall".^{[a]} William Chinnery expanded Gilwell's land holdings through significant purchases over 15 years and with his wife, transformed it into a country estate with gardens, paths and statues. Parts of the garden, paths and dwelling modifications existed into the 21st century. William Chinnery was exposed as the embezzler of a small fortune from his employer the British Treasury and was dismissed from all his posts on 12 March 1812. On 2 July the same year, Margaret Chinnery was forced to sign over Gilwell Estate to the Exchequer.

The Chinnery family were prominent enough for members of the English nobility to visit them often during the 1790s and early 19th century.^{[a]} King George III visited on occasion and the Prince Regent, who later became George IV, was a regular visitor. George III's seventh son Prince Adolphus became a family friend, lived at Gilwell for a while and tutored the Chinnerys' eldest son George.

In 1815, Gilpin Gorst bought the estate at public auction and his son sold it to Thomas Usborne in 1824. When London Bridge was replaced in 1826, Usborne bought pieces of the stone balustrades, which date to 1209 and erected them around the Buffalo Lawn behind the White House. The estate changed ownership more times but these families did not maintain the property and by 1900, it had fallen into disrepair. In 1911 local resident Reverend Cranshaw bought the estate; he was the last owner prior to The Boy Scouts Association.

==== Purchase by The Boy Scouts Association ====
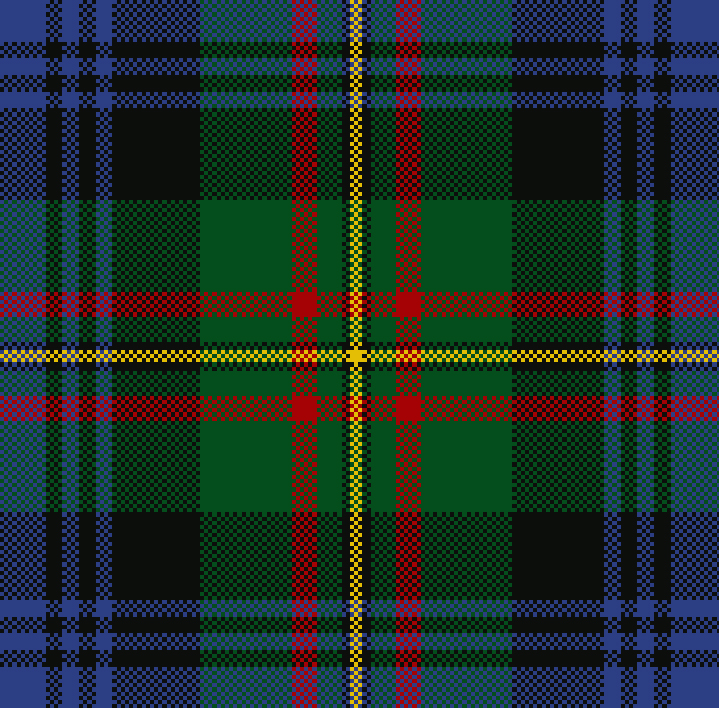
MacLaren Tartan

William de Bois Maclaren, a wealthy publisher and Scout Commissioner from Rosneath, Dumbartonshire, Scotland, suggested a campsite was needed for Scouts in the East End of London. The Boy Scouts Association appointed its Scout Commissioner of the East End, P.B. Nevill, to deal with the issue. On 20 November 1918, over dinner at Roland House, the Scout Hostel in Stepney run by Nevill, Maclaren agreed to donate £7,000 to the project. Part of the agreement included narrowing the search for suitable land to Hainault Forest and Epping Forest. Rover Scouts searched both without success but John Gayfer, a young assistant Scoutmaster, suggested Gilwell Hall, which he visited to watch birds. Nevill visited the estate and was impressed, though the buildings were in poor condition. The estate. which then occupied 21 ha (52 acres), was for sale for £7,000, the sum Maclaren had donated.^{[a]} In early 1919, Maclaren purchased the estate for The Boy Scouts Association. Nevill first took his Rover Scouts to begin repairing the estate on 17 April 1919. Maclaren was a frequent visitor to Gilwell Park and helped repair the buildings and donated another £3,000. An official opening was planned for 19 July 1919 but was delayed until 26 July so Scouts could participate in the Official Peace Festival commemorating the end of the First World War. Invitations were changed by hand to save money.^{[a]}

Maclaren's interest had been to provide a campground for Scouts but Robert Baden-Powell envisaged a training centre for Scouters and the first adult Scout leader training, with eighteen participants, took place in September 1919. In the 1920s, significant remodeling and construction was done but, because of limited finances, few improvements were made during the Great Depression of the 1930s.

Baden-Powell took the park's name as the territorial designation in his peerage title 1st Baron Baden-Powell of Gilwell in 1929.

=== Origin of the axe and log totem ===
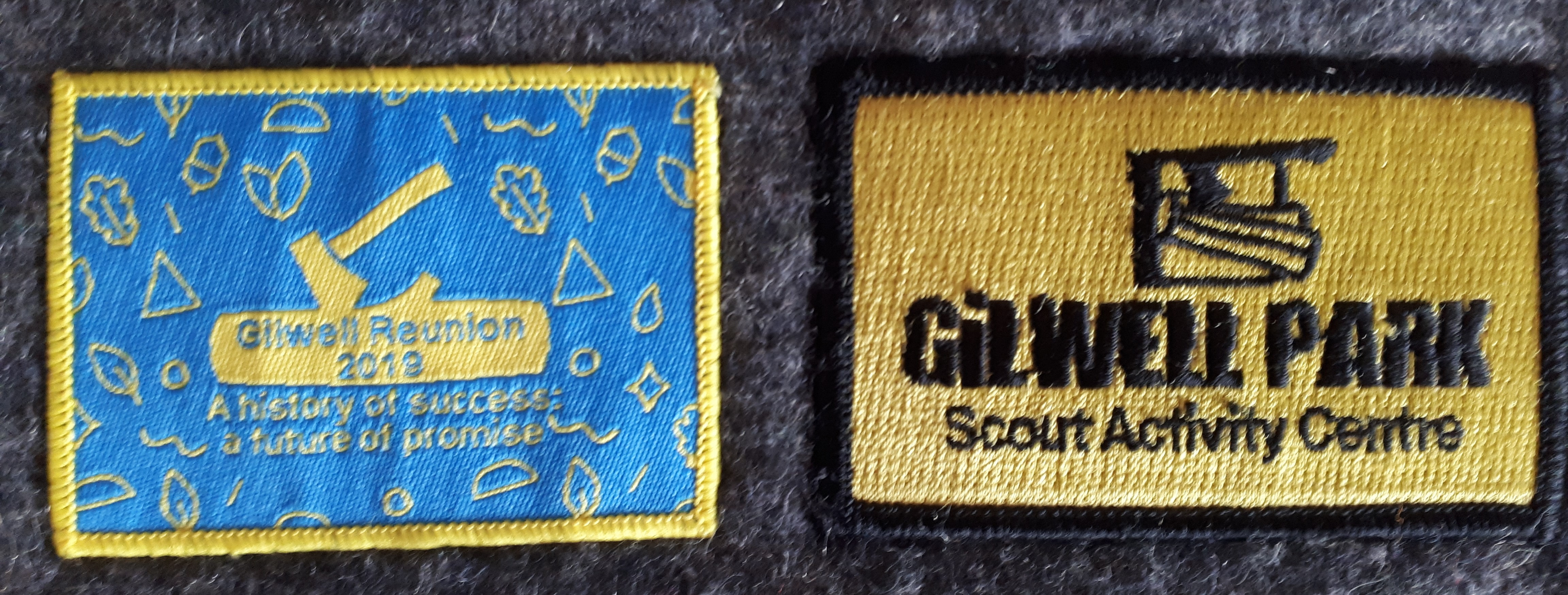
Two examples of the Gilwell axe and log emblem: 2019 Gilwell Reunion badge which marked the 100th anniversary of Gilwell Park (l) and the logo of the activity centre between 2009 and 2016 (r)

The symbol of the axe in the log is associated with feudalism that was instituted after the invasion and conquest of England by William the Conqueror. In that era, property, including forests, were owned by the landed barons and knights. Serfs were forbidden to cut wood from trees in the forest and only permitted to gather fallen wood. A freeman who carried an axe in a nobleman's forest demonstrated he had earned the right by service.

The axe-and-log logo was conceived by Francis Gidney in the early 1920s to distinguish Gilwell Park from the Scout Headquarters. Gidney wanted to associate Gilwell Park with the outdoors and scoutcraft rather than the business and administrative headquarters offices. At Wood Badge courses, axe blades were masked for safety by being buried in a log. Seeing this, Gidney chose the axe-and-log as the totem of Gilwell Park. This logo came to be strongly associated with Wood Badge leader training and is still used on certificates, flags and other items.

=== 1940s and later development ===
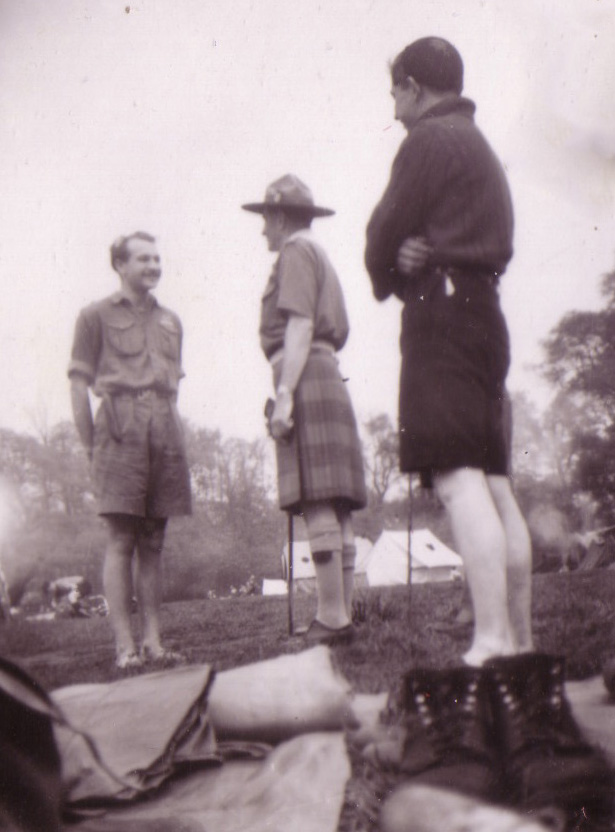
Scouts from the Norwegian Scout group 18. Bergen meet Chief Scout Lord Rowallan (centre) in Gilwell Park, 1950.

In 1940, during the Second World War, the War Ministry requisitioned the Gilwell estate as a local command, training and ordnance centre and remained there until 1945. Little remains at the estate from this period, except a hole that was created by a bomb the Luftwaffe dropped. The hole was enlarged and is now used for swimming and canoeing.

The purchase of Gilwellbury and adjoining land in 1945 allowed The Scout Association to close the original road and fully use Branchet Field. It was originally used for small retreats and conferences but is now used as staff accommodation. The Ministry of Education assisted in the purchase.^{[a]}

After the war, The Boy Scouts Association bought adjoining land to increase the estate and protect it from rapidly approaching new developments. These areas are called The Quick, New Field and Hilly Field. An additional purchase and a donation from South Africa in the early 1950s brought the estate to its present size.^{[a]} Camping facilities for Scouts were extended until the early 1960s. Training and sleeping facilities were added in the early 1970s.

The Gilwell Farmhouse is believed to date from the early 18th century, making it the oldest original building at Gilwell Park. It is composed of two buildings that were joined. There is a brick wellhead on the farm that is known as the Gil Well.^{[a]} A field adjoining the boundaries of Gilwell Park, known as Bill Oddie Field, affords dramatic views of the London skyline over Pole Hill, Chingford. The field was named in 2006 after employees of The Scout Association saw television ornithologist Bill Oddie recording a programme there.

During the 1970s, the Dorothy Hughes Pack Holiday Centre for Cub Scouts and the Colquhoun International Centre for training Scouters – which was originally called The International Hall of Friendship – were built. In the 1980s, the White House was extensive remodelled. In April 2001, The Scout Association moved its program staff from London to Gilwell Park, where its training staff were already located. Extensive renovations were done to the White House and other buildings.^{[a]} With a budget of £20,000,000 and individual contributions as high as £500,000, improvements to programs and facilities occurred in preparation for the 21st World Scout Jamboree in 2007, which was the 100th anniversary of Scouting, hosted at nearby Hylands Park, Chelmsford, with related activities held at Gilwell Park. Gilwell Park generates over £1,000,000 a year for The Scout Association through conference fees, accommodation fees and sales of materials.

=== Leader training ===
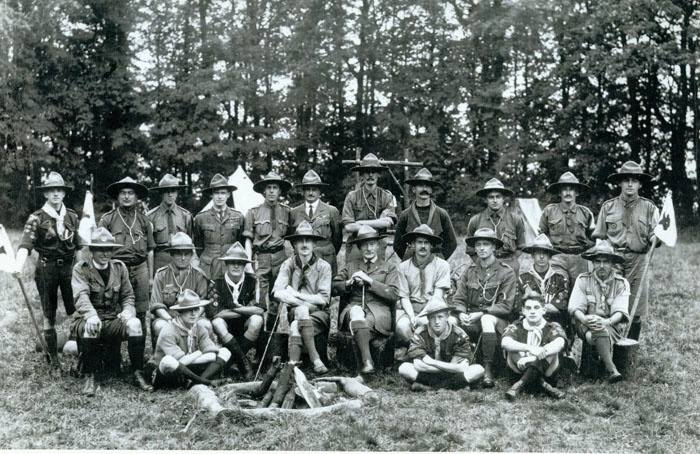
First Wood Badge training at Gilwell Park

The most-prominent leader-training courses conducted at Gilwell Park are Wood Badge courses. Francis Gidney, the first Camp Chief, conducted the first Wood Badge course there in September 1919. Leaders from all over the world receive automatic membership in 1st Gilwell Park Scout Group (Gilwell Troop 1) on completion of the Wood Badge course. These leaders are henceforth called Wood Badgers or Gilwellians. Any location in which Wood Badgers meet is called Gilwell Field. Holders of the Wood Badge become members of the 1st Gilwell Park Scout Group, which meets every first weekend of September in Gilwell Park for the Gilwell Reunion.^{[a]}

=== Camp Chiefs and other staff ===
Captain Francis "Skipper" Gidney became the first Camp Chief in May 1919 and served until 1923. He organized the first Wood Badge training and contributed to setting up Gilwell Park as the Scouters' training centre. The Gidney Cabin was built and named in his honour in 1929 to serve as a training centre.^{[a]} The second Camp Chief was John Skinner Wilson, who served from 1923 until 1939. Wilson had been an Indian Imperial Police colonel when he became a Scout Leader in 1917. In 1921 he travelled to Gilwell Park to take leader training, which led to his retirement from the Indian Police in 1922 to become a full-time Scout Association official. He was honoured with the Bronze Wolf Award in 1937, the only distinction of the World Organization of the Scout Movement.

R.F. "John" Thurman was a British Scout Leader who served as Camp Chief from 1943 until 1969 and was awarded the Bronze Wolf Award in 1959. He was a strong promoter of Scout training and wrote books on the subject. The Thurman Memorial stands near The Pigsty.^{[a]} Thurman was succeeded by John Huskin as director of leader training.

Don Potter (1902–2004) was an English sculptor and wood carver who was a lifelong staff member at Gilwell Park, serving as a Gilwell Master Craftsman. Potter created wood carvings at Gilwell Park, including the Jim Green Gate, Gidney Cabin, the Leopard Gates and totems he carved for the 1929 World Jamboree.

== Facilities ==
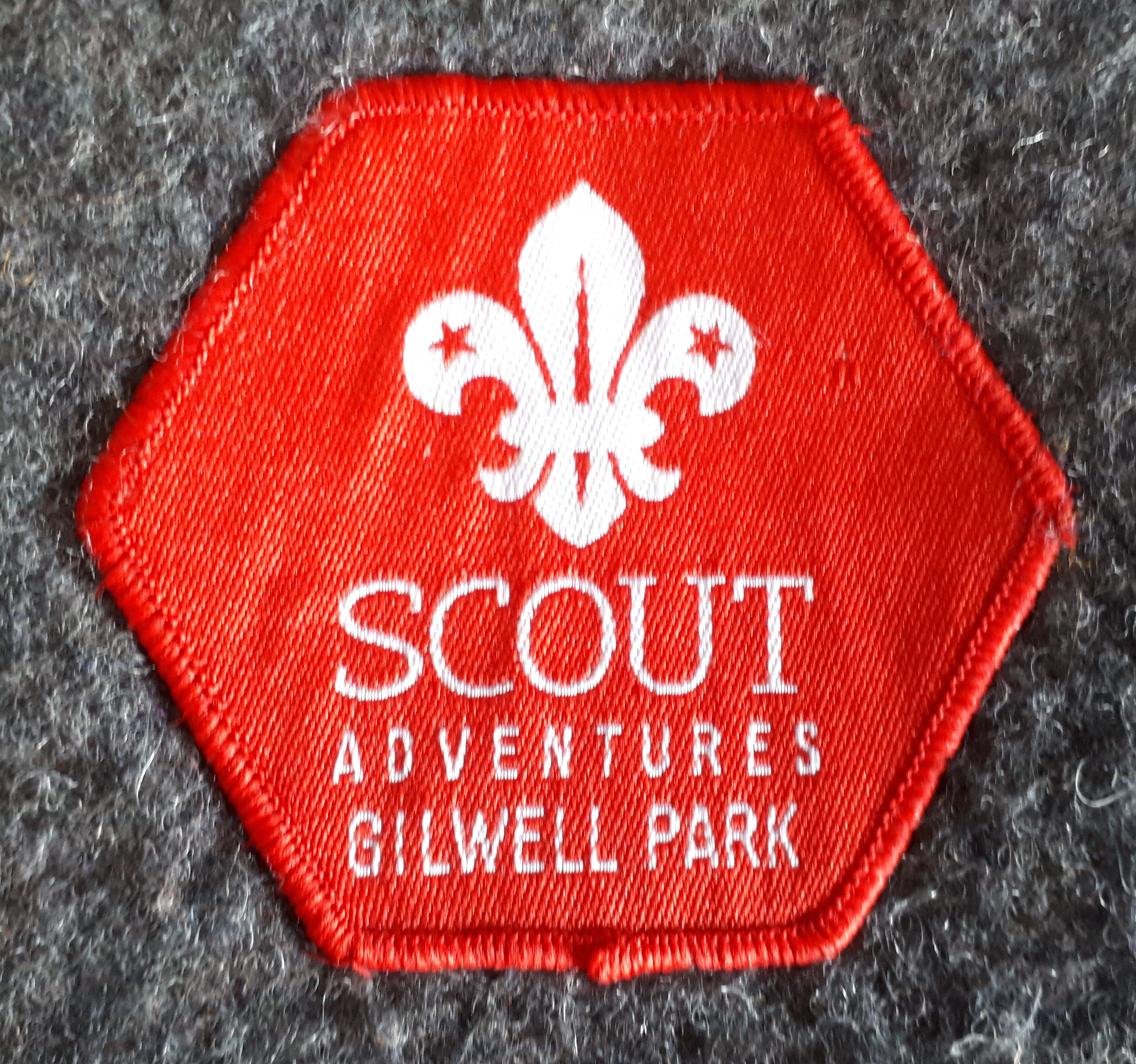
Badge showing the logo for Scout Adventures Gilwell Park as used between 2016 and 2018

Since 2016, the activity centre at Gilwell Park is run and managed by Scout Adventures following a re-branding of Scout Activity Centres. The centre offers outdoor and indoor adventure activities, as well as accommodation and camping for Scout and Guide groups, schools and other youth organisations.

=== Activities ===
Activities provided by Scout Adventures at Gilwell Park include high rope activities, rock climbing, 3G swing, archery, rifle shooting, kayaking and raft building.

=== Camping fields ===
Gilwell Park provides camping facilities for small groups and groups of more than 2,500 people. Facilities include:

- Essex Chase; a large, open field. It is a popular field, due to its proximity to a toilet block, the main campfire circles and Camp Square. During summer months this field is also the site of two tentage villages, a permanent camping facility for groups of up to 40 people.
- Woodlands Field is a large field that can accommodate up to 200 campers.
- Branchet Field is the largest campsite and will hold 1,200 campers.
- Mallinson Field is a small, wooded, secluded area suited to small groups.
- The Paddock is a smaller camping field that has a toilet block and holds 30 campers.
- Ferryman Field is a split-level field that is suitable for basic camping. It is wooded and distant from facilities.

=== Accommodation ===
==== Dorothy Hughes Centre ====
The Dorothy Hughes Centre (previously known as Pack Holiday Centre) was built in 1970.^{[a]} It is named after a Cub Scout Leader from East London who wished to see a purpose-built facility for Cub Scout holidays.^{[a]} The centre can sleep 40 people, primarily in dormitory-style rooms with smaller rooms for use by group leaders.

==== Branchet Lodge ====
Branchet Lodge, named after the field upon which it is sited, opened on 23 May 2003 to replace portable cabins. Branchet Lodge is a single storey building that has central heating and sleeps up to 56 people in two wings with a common kitchen and main hall.

==== Jack Petchey Lodge ====
The Jack Petchey Lodge opened in September 2008, located next to the Branchet Lodge. lt has laundry facilities.

==== Peter Harrison Lodge ====
The Peter Harrison Lodge was built in 2009 and is the newest accommodation building at Gilwell Park. The building sleeps 50 people.

==== Patrol cabins ====
Log cabins on the edge of Woodland Field sleep eight each in bunk beds. Cooking is provided in a separate shelter or an open fire can be used.

=== International volunteers ===
Each year, Scout Adventures recruits up to 120 volunteers from over 30 countries to assist in the running of its centres. Scout Adventures at Gilwell Park has between 20 and 50 volunteers, who stay for a maximum of one year and are provided with accommodation in return for their work. These volunteers are trained to run activity sessions for guests, carry out maintenance and improvement works on the site and provide customer service.

A purpose-built accommodation building was opened in 2016 to house an increasing number of volunteers following the degradation of previous accommodation in The Den (now demolished) and Gilwellbury. The International Volunteer Lodge cost £1.2m to build, the funding for which came from the Jack Petchey Foundation and several private donors. The building is mostly timber framed with a large social space constructed using glulam beams and includes a two-storey sleeping area. This provides 26 double bedrooms and an accessible bedroom, all with en-suite facilities. The single-storey social spaces include a drying and boot room, laundry room, open-plan kitchen, dining and lounge area, quiet room and cinema-style room. Visitors are allowed entry according to stipulations laid down by donor bequests.

=== White House ===
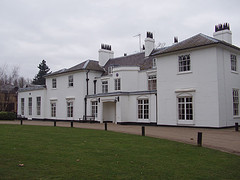
The White House at Gilwell Park

The White House became the headquarters of The Scout Association on 27 April 2001, although Baden-Powell House (the former headquarters) still housed some departments of the association for some time after. The White House is used as a private hotel for staff and family members, closing toto the public in 2020.^{[a]} The hotel comprises 41 guest bedrooms (35 en-suite) across the White House and its modern extension.

=== Colquhoun International Centre ===
Colquhoun International Centre (CIC) was built in 1971 as a Scout leader training centre and was renovated in 1995. The building has a main hall that can seat up to 250 people, two smaller training suites and five seminar rooms. The main hall is regularly used for large weddings, dinners and parties; with the seminar rooms and training suites used for conferences and meetings. The CIC also houses a second bar that is used during functions.

== Attractions ==
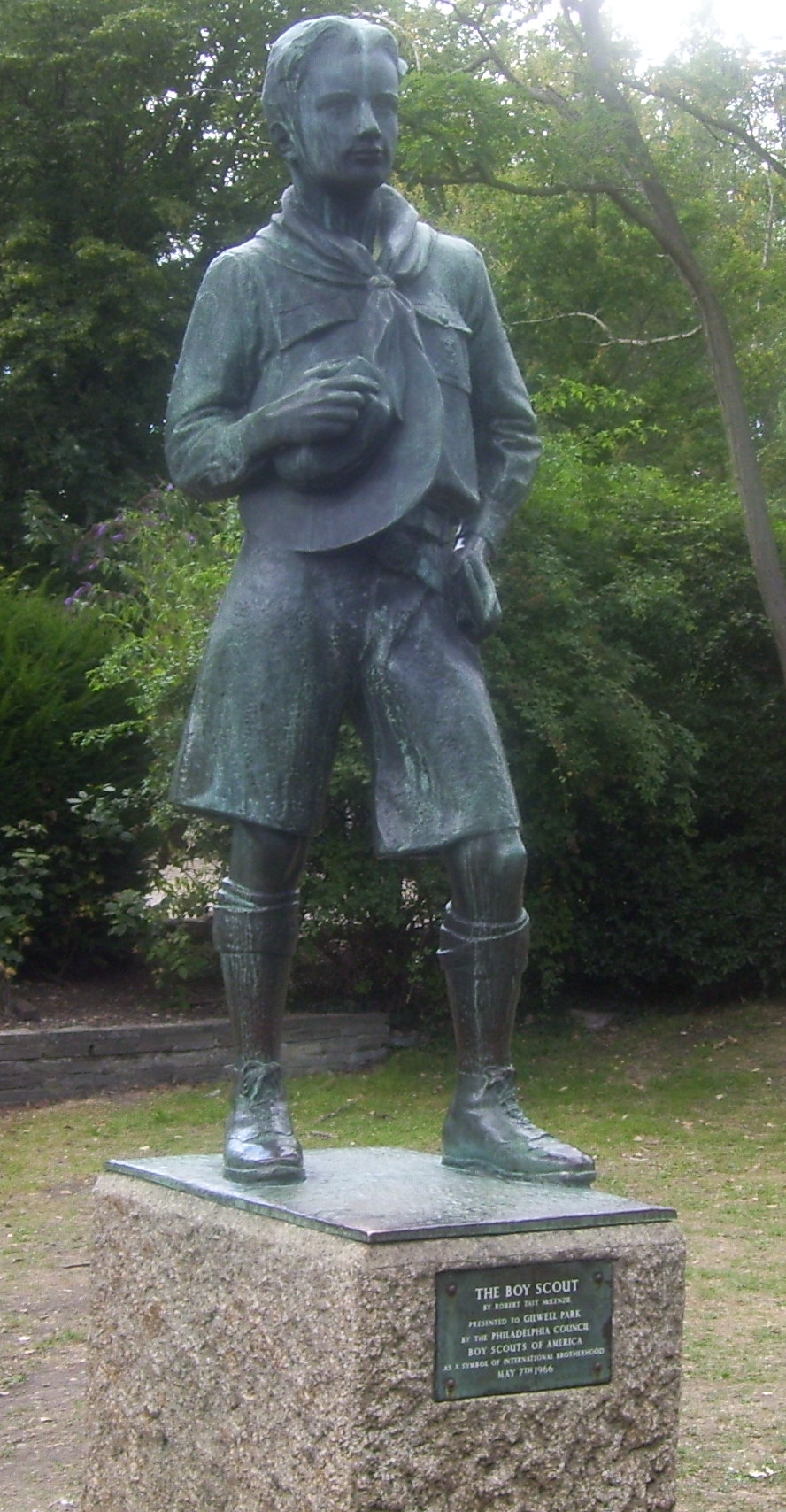
The Ideal Scout

Gilwell Park has many attractions, primarily Scouting in nature. It has a souvenir shop called The Providore. Gilwell Park museum has closed and is now called the "Heritage Collection."

=== Buildings of note ===
The White House, which was built in 1750, is timber framed. It was extended in 1830 and in the 1960s. The exterior is covered in hung slates, which caused extensive damage to the original frame, which required extensive repairs in 1994. The 1797 chimneys are pointed to stop birds nesting and draw smoke up from the fire. The lawn in front of the building was the house's original turning circle and the road was once a thoroughfare from Chingford to Waltham Abbey.^{[a]}

The White House is connected to The Barn (originally The Stables), a red-brick building built in 1926. The archway in the centre of the building was originally an open passageway. It now houses the reception area for the Training and Event Centre. The first floor of the building was used as training rooms for Cub Scout Leaders. A clock on the front of the building was a gift from a former Japanese Chief Scout Count Sano, who was present at an early training course at Gilwell Park.^{[a]} The weather vane on the roof depicts Dick Turpin, who was rumoured to live on the site.

Close to the estate entrance, The Lodge was built in 1934 as the Camp Chief's home; this was succeeded by the Director of Programme and Development.^{[a]} The building is now used to accommodate Scout Association staff and host internal meetings.

Gilwell Farm is the oldest building on the site still extant, dating from the 1600s. The building started as two separate cottages.^{[a]} In the grounds of the building is the site's last-remaining well, which is known as Gil Well. The Farm was refurbished from its derelict state, opening in 2015 as the new offices and reception of Scout Adventures Gilwell Park. The nearby Leopard Gates mark the original entrance to Gilwell Park and were carved by Gilwell master craftsman Don Potter in 1928.

The Lid, which originally consisted of a roof but no walls, was a wet-weather shelter built in 1967.^{[a]} In 2009, the building was renovated and now houses a large activity hall, two classrooms, staff space and a large store room. The activity hall houses all the indoor activities on-site, including an archery range and climbing walls. In front of The Lid is the R. Tait McKenzie statue, The Ideal Scout, which was gifted by the Boy Scouts of America in 1966.

The Barnacle was built in 1950 as a first-aid centre but later became a volunteer-run cottage hospital for visitors and the local community. It housed a six-bed ward, isolation room, dental surgery, X-ray room and operating theatre.^{[a]} In the late 1980s, the building became volunteer accommodation until it was decommissioned in 2016 with the opening of the International Volunteer Lodge. As of 2022, the building is empty and has an uncertain future.

The Pigsty, a small gardener’s shed located on The Orchard, has been preserved as the first campsite at Gilwell Park. The first group of Rover Scouts who arrived to prepare the site when it was purchased in 1919 slept here when the weather proved too inclement to pitch their tents.^{[a]}

The Syd Kesseler Centre opened in November 2025 and now houses the activity centre reception, shop and interactive gallery showing the history of Scouting and Gilwell Park. The building includes a modern timber extension and a refurbishment of The Lodge to house the reception and office facilities of the activity centre.

=== Faith buildings ===
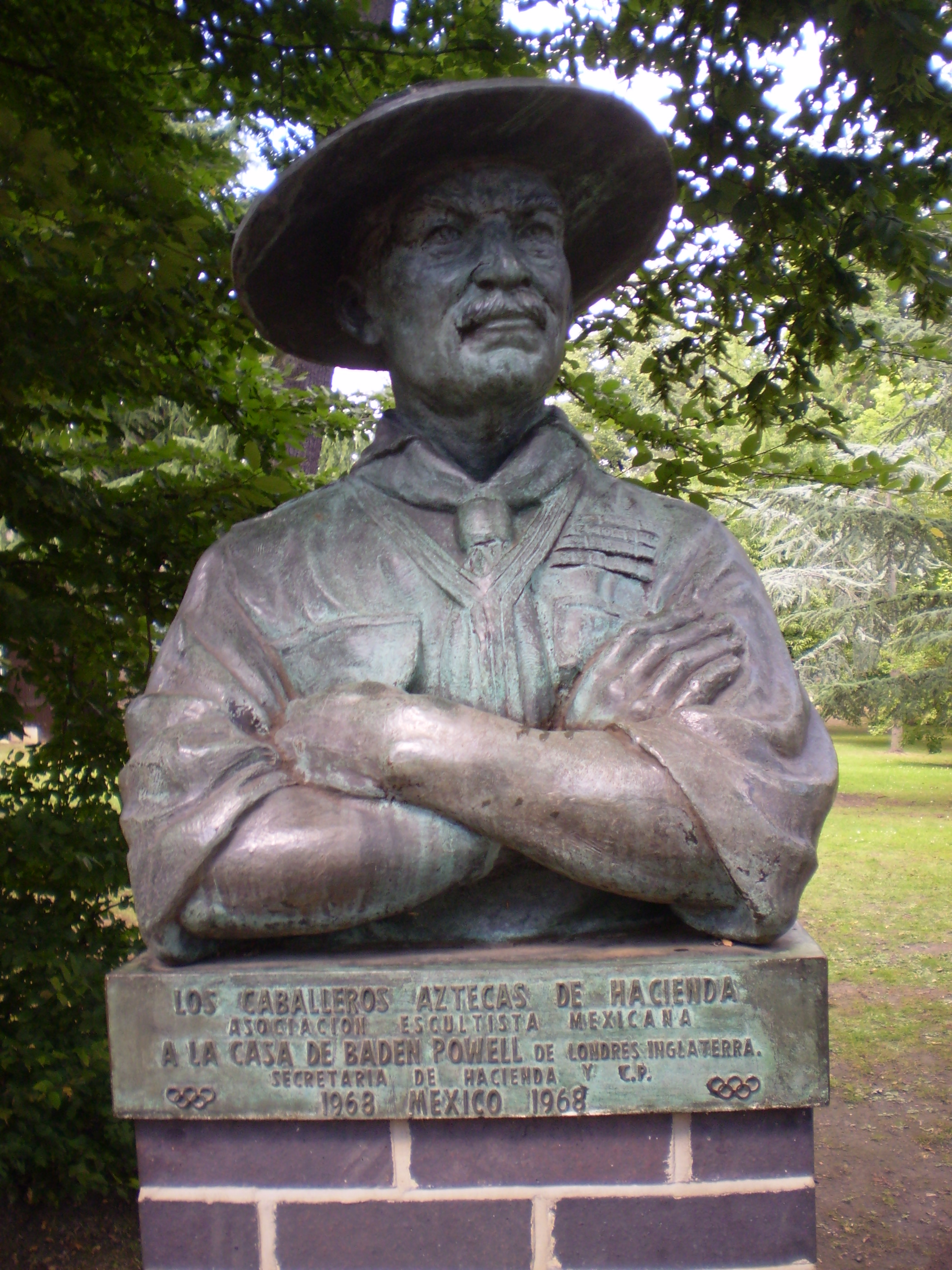
A bust of Baden-Powell presented by the Caballeros Aztecas (Aztecs Knights, a Scout Association of Mexico), located near the Buffalo Lawn at Gilwell Park

The site houses to five places of worship for Scouts and other visitors located along the Gilwell Park Faith Walk, including a Buddhist sala, Jewish synagogue and an Islamic mosque. The sala was donated to Gilwell Park in 1967 by the Boy Scouts of Thailand and the Buddha statue was a gift from the Thai government and is over 1,000 years old. Thai ambassadors to the United Kingdom often visit the sala because it is their responsibility to care for it.^{[a]} The Gilwell Park mosque was established in 2015.

=== Camp Square ===
Camp Square included a Warden's Office (now demolished), shop, soft drinks bar, staff space and toilet block. In the centre of the Square is the clock tower, known as Big Mac, which was named after Camp Warden Alfred Macintosh.^{[a]}

Behind Camp Square, The Bomb Hole was created when a bomb was dropped on the site during the Second World War, creating a small crater. The Bomb Hole has been extended several times and is now used for kayaking, raft building and pond-dipping activities.

=== Other attractions ===
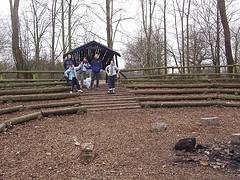
The Small Campfire Circle at Gilwell Park

Two campfire circles are used extensively during the peak camping season. Large Campfire Circle has a Maori Gateway that was presented by the Scouts New Zealand in 1951.

Lime Walk, which was constructed by previous estate owner Margaret Chinnery, surrounds the training ground, which was the original main lawn of the White House.^{[a]} Few of the lime trees survive to this day. On this path sits Jim Green Gate, a 1930 tribute to Jim Green, an editor of The Scouter magazine.

Buffalo Lawn is so called because of a replica of the Boy Scouts of America Silver Buffalo Award that was presented by the Boy Scouts of America in 1926 to honour the Unknown Scout who helped William D. Boyce take Scouting to the United States. Located there is a signpost with the directions and distances to World Scout Jamboree sites from Gilwell Park. Surrounding the Buffalo Lawn is part of the original balustrade of London Bridge, which was re-built in 1820. The sections were moved to Gilwell Park after being purchased at auction in 1826.

Considered by many to be the most important Scouting site, Training Ground is where Wood Badge training was held and where the Gilwell oak tree is located. Contrary to popular belief, Wood Badge beads have never been made of Gilwell Oak.^{[a]} On Training Ground sits Gidney Cabin, a memorial to the first Camp Chief Francis Gidney, in 1929. Across from the Gidney Cabin is Thurman Memorial, which was erected in memory of Camp Chief John Thurman.

A caravan trailer that was presented to Chief Scout Sir Robert Baden-Powell along with a new Rolls-Royce car during the 3rd World Scout Jamboree in 1929 is on display during mid-year months. The caravan was nicknamed Eccles. The car, nicknamed Jam Roll, was sold after his death by Olave Baden-Powell in 1945.

Gilwell Park also has other, smaller memorials, statues, places and objects of historical and Scouting importance.

== See also ==
- Gilwell Campsite, Hong Kong
- Gilwell Park (Victoria), Australia
- Brownsea Island, Baden-Powell House (SA)
- Kandersteg International Scout Centre (WOSM)
- Pax Hill, Our Chalet (WAGGGS)
- Philmont Scout Ranch, Philmont Training Center (BSA)
