= Percy Everett =

Scouting leader and editor (1870–1953)

Sir Percy Everett
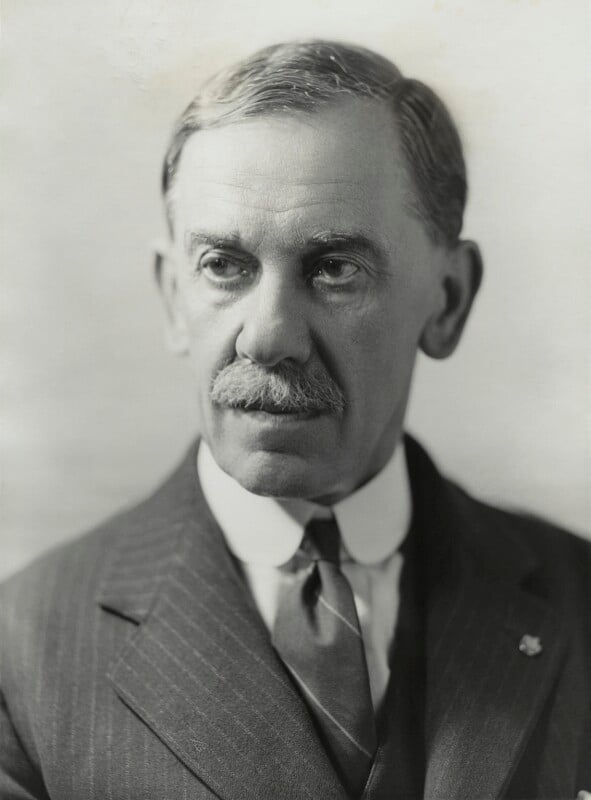
- Everett in 1936
- Born: Percy Winn Everett; 22 April 1870; Rushmere, Ipswich, England
- Died: 23 February 1952 (aged 81); Elstree, England
- Occupation: Editor
- Employer: C. Arthur Pearson Limited
- Known for: Deputy Chief Scout of The Boy Scouts Association
- Spouse: Sarah Cay (m. 1896)
- Children: Geraldine Winn Everett
- Parent(s): Robert Lacey Everett and Elizabeth Nussey

Sir Percy Winn Everett (22 April 1870 – 23 February 1952) was an English editor-in-chief for the publisher C. Arthur Pearson Limited and a Scouter who became The Boy Scouts Association's Deputy Chief Scout.

== Personal life ==
Born on 22 April 1870 in Rushmere, Ipswich, Everett was the third of the eight children of parents Robert Lacey Everett (1833-1916) and Elizabeth Nussey (b. 1840).

Everett married Sarah Cay (b. 1872) in St Hilda's Church, South Shields on 23 April 1896. The couple had a daughter, Geraldine "Winn" Everett (1903–1998), who became a prominent physician in Elstree. Her godfather was the notable English journalist, writer and editor, Bertram Fletcher Robinson.

Everett died in Elstree on 23 February 1952.

== Boy Scouts ==
In 1906, Everett was assigned by Arthur Pearson to support Robert Baden-Powell in publishing Scouting for Boys. He helped organize and participated for a day in the Brownsea Island Scout camp in 1907 and organized much of the promotion around the launch of the book and Boy Scout scheme. He became the first Scoutmaster of the 1st Elstree Scouts on 13 March 1908.

In 1919, he organized the first Wood Badge leadership training in Gilwell Park. The Boy Scouts Association conferred a six-bead Wood Badge on Everett, which, in 1948, he passed to Gilwell Park's Camp Chief John Thurman, to be worn by successive leader trainers. He was knighted in 1930, "For services in connection with the Boy Scouts and Girl Guides Movement".

Everett wrote The First Ten Years in 1948 (88 pages, published by the East Anglian Daily Times), about the first ten years of the Scout Movement.

== Girl Guides ==
Everett was Hon. secretary of the Girl Guides Association and was awarded the Silver Fish Award, the movement's highest adult honour, in 1921.
