= Francis Gidney =

Francis Gidney (1890–1928) was an early leader in the Scout Movement in the United Kingdom. The Boy Scouts Association employed him as its first camp chief of Gilwell Park from May 1919 to 1923 and he organized its first Wood Badge adult leader training course there in September 1919. The Gidney Cabin at Gilwell was named after him.

== Biography ==
Gidney started an early Scout Troop in 1908, while at Lichfield Grammar School and only 16-17 years old. He was educated at Selwyn College, Cambridge, where he was in the rowing team and graduated in 1914. He served as a Lieutenant and then Captain in the Rifle Brigade in World War I and was wounded and invalided out of the army.

In 1919, Gidney was employed by The Boy Scouts Association as its Gilwell Park camp chief and adult leader trainer. It was his idea to start the 1st Gilwell Scout Troop (now 1st Gilwell Park Scout Group) for all Wood Badge holders, with its distinctive neckerchief and he established the Gilwell Reunions. Gidney established the pen name of "Gilcraft", writing articles in The Scout and the Headquarters Gazette and several instructional books and booklets for both adult Scouters and boys and the pseudonym was subsequently continued by his successors at Gilwell in the interwar period. His position in The Scout Association led to financial and marital difficulties. He complained that he was underpaid and his wife did not care much for Scouting. The marriage eventually foundered. They had at least three children, one of whom died in 1921 (his son, Alan Francis Gidney, later became an officer in the 10th Gurkha Rifles and was mentioned in dispatches during the Burma Campaign). Questions about financial administration and disputes about how Gilwell Park should be managed led to Gidney resigning in 1923. Gidney had spent three months in the United States with his wife and had impressed James West of the Boy Scouts of America who asked about offering Gidney a job but Robert Baden-Powell spitefully maligned Gidney.

Gidney then worked as a Master at a preparatory school in Bournemouth, before retiring due to ill health. Gidney died from complications to his war wounds in 1928 at the age of 38.

The Frank Gidney Memorial Cabin was built at Gilwell by Don Potter, one of the staff members, who had been given his first set of woodworking tools by Gidney. The cabin was opened by Baden-Powell on Easter Sunday, 1930.
