= Jan Schaap =

Jan Frederik Schaap

Jan F. Schaap
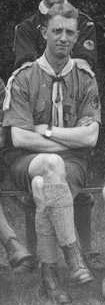
- Hopman Jan Schaap on 3rd Dutch Wood Badge training
- Born: July 9, 1893; Dordrecht
- Died: January 10, 1963; The Hague
- Occupation: Scoutmaster

Jan Frederik Schaap was a Scoutmaster in The Hague and a frontman in the first decades of Scouting in The Netherlands.

== History ==
Schaap's contributions to Scouting include the Dutch translation of Scouting for Boys (1924 and several later editions) and other books. In The Hague, he led the '2nd The Hague Troup' (Dutch: 2e 's-Gravenhaagsche troep) together with Philip Baron van Pallandt (who later inherited his uncle's estates Het Laar en Eerde in Ommen). The estate Het Laar contained the site for Gilwell Ada's Hoeve. In July 1923, Schaap organized the first Dutch Wood Badge Scout leadership training at Scout centre Gilwell Ada's Hoeve in Ommen. As the editor of the monthly magazine De Padvinder (1914 onward), he wrote the campsong of the 5th World Scout Jamboree in Vogelenzang.(lyrics: Dutch: In 19-3-7 zul je wat beleven, dan komt de jamboree naar Nederland).
