= Home Notes =

British women monthly magazine

- Categories: Woman's magazine
- Frequency: Weekly / Monthly
- Publisher: C. Arthur Pearson
- Founder: Arthur Pearson
- Founded: 1894
- First issue: January 1894
- Final issue: 1958
- Country: United Kingdom
- Based in: London
- Language: English

Home Notes was a British monthly women's magazine.

== History and profile ==
Sir Arthur Pearson, 1st Baronet founded Home Notes with the aim of dominating the penny magazine market. Home Notes went on to compete with Amalgamated Press' Home Chat and Woman's Life. Pearson founded it in January 1894 and the magazine ran until 1958 when it was taken over by sister title Woman’s Own. It was published as a small format magazine which was initially issued weekly, but later changed to monthly. The formulation was to cover society gossip and domestic tips along with short stories, dress patterns, recipes and competitions.
