= Neville Pearson =

British newspaper publisher (1898–1982)

Sir Neville Pearson Bt.
- Born: Neville Arthur Pearson; 13 February 1898; Frensham, Surrey, England
- Died: 6 November 1982 (aged 84)
- Occupation: Publisher
- Employer: George Newnes Ltd
- Known for: St Dunstan's Hostel for the Blind
- Title: 2nd Baronet of St Dunstan's
- Spouse(s): Mary Angela Mond (m. 1922; div. 1927) Gladys Cooper (m. 1928; div. 1936)
- Children: Anne Pearson (1923); Nigel Arthur Pearson (1925); Sally Pearson (1929)
- Parent(s): Sir Arthur Pearson, 1st Baronet and Ethel Pearson

Sir Neville Arthur Pearson, 2nd Baronet (13 February 1898 – 6 November 1982) was a British newspaper publisher.

== Biography ==
Born in Frensham, Surrey, he was the son of the British newspaper magnate Sir C. Arthur and Dame Ethel (Fraser) Pearson. His father, who was a journalist, died in 1921, whereupon he succeeded to the baronetage.

Pearson served during the World War I from 1917 to 1918 in the Royal Field Artillery. He succeeded his father as publisher of a number of magazines (working for George Newnes Ltd in London, which had acquired C. Arthur Pearson Ltd as an imprint). From 1923 to 1953 his private secretary at George Newnes Ltd. was the British poet and novelist Stevie Smith.

He was married in 1922 to Hon. Mary Angela Mond, daughter of the Minister of Health Alfred Moritz Mond, 1st Baron Melchett. In 1928 he married the actress Gladys Cooper, but divorced her in 1936. Sir Neville and Lady Pearson had one daughter, Sally Pearson, a.k.a. Sally Cooper, who was married to actor Robert Hardy from 1961 to 1986.

Sir Neville served again, during World War II, as a major in an anti-aircraft regiment of the Royal Artillery. In 1947 he succeeded his mother as president of St Dunstan's Hostel for the Blind, the home for blinded soldiers from World War I which his father, who had become blind himself, had founded in 1915.

Pearson, who by that time had taken residence in the United States at Hightstown, New Jersey, died on 6 November 1982, aged 84. On his death, the baronetcy became extinct.

== See also ==
- Pearson Baronets

== General references ==
- Pine, L. G.. Burke's Genealogical and Heraldic History of the Landed Gentry, 17th edition. London, England: Burke's Peerage Ltd, 1952.
- Photos of Neville Pearson, National Portrait Gallery, London

Baronetage of the United Kingdom
Preceded by Arthur Pearson	Baronet (of St Dunstan's); 1921–1982	Extinct
