= Pearson baronets =

Baronetcy in the Baronetage of the United Kingdom

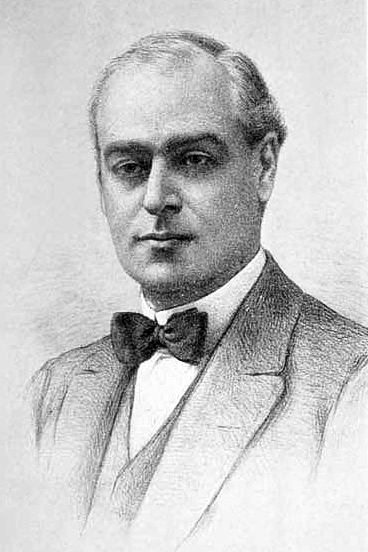
Sir Arthur Pearson, 1st Baronet

There have been three baronetcies for persons with the surname Pearson, all in the Baronetage of the United Kingdom. Two of the creations are extant as of 2010.

The Pearson Baronetcy, of Cowdray in the County of Sussex, was created in the Baronetage of the United Kingdom on 26 June 1894. For more information on this creation, see Viscount Cowdray.

The Pearson Baronetcy, of St Dunstan's in the County of London, was created in the Baronetage of the United Kingdom on 12 July 1916 for the newspaper magnate and publisher Arthur Pearson. He was the founder of the Daily Express. The title became extinct on the death of his son, the second baronet, in 1982. Ethel, Lady Pearson, second wife of the first baronet and mother of the second baronet, was a humanitarian.

The Pearson Baronetcy, of Gressingham in the County Palatine of Lancaster, was created in the Baronetage of the United Kingdom on 30 December 1964 for Francis Pearson, Conservative member of parliament for Clitheroe. As of 2010 the title is held by his son, the second baronet, who succeeded in 1991.

== Pearson baronets, of Cowdray (1894) ==
- see Viscount Cowdray

== Pearson baronets of St Dunstan's (1916) ==
Escutcheon of the Pearson baronets of St Dunstan's

- Sir (Cyril) Arthur Pearson, 1st Baronet (1866–1921)
- Sir Neville Arthur Pearson, 2nd Baronet (1898–1982)

== Pearson baronets, of Gressingham (1964) ==
Escutcheon of the Pearson baronets of Gressingham

- Sir Francis Fenwick Pearson, 1st Baronet (1911–1991)
- Sir Francis Nicholas Fraser Pearson, 2nd Baronet (born 1943)

There is no heir to the title.

== Notes ==
Baronetage of the United Kingdom
Preceded by Finlay baronets	Pearson baronets of Gressingham; 31 December 1964	Succeeded by Thatcher baronets
