= Scouting magazine (The Scout Association) =

Scouting
- Frequency: Bi-monthly
- Publisher: The Scout Association
- Total circulation (2013): 116,700
- Founded: 1909 (as Headquarters Gazette); 1971 (as Scouting)

Scouting magazine was a bi-monthly publication of The Scout Association. The magazine included information, resources and support for both young people and adults involved with The Scout Association and Scouting. From 2004, it was supplied free of direct charge to adult leaders and office holders of the association. The magazine originated in July 1909 as the Headquarters Gazette, merged with other periodical publications and had several changes of title, content, format and distribution method. The last issue was published in the autumn of 2020.

== Previous and other publications ==
=== The Scout (1908–1966) ===
The Scout, a weekly magazine for boys, was first published by Cyril Arthur Pearson on 14 April 1908, only weeks after Scouting for Boys, the book which Robert Baden-Powell and Pearson had used to promote the Scout Movement. The editor's office of The Scout initially provided a focus for both adults and boys seeking assistance with starting and running a Scout Troop. The advice given was sometimes at variance with Baden-Powell's wishes and he was horrified at Pearson's allocation of places at "the first official Scout camp" at Humshaugh, which effectively went to the Scouts who had bought the most copies of the magazine. In August 1933, falling sales prompted a change of title to Every Boy's Weekly with a reduction of content relating directly to Scouting, in an effort to broaden its appeal. In 1939, Newnes and Pearson decided that it was not profitable to continue publication, so it was taken over by The Boy Scouts Association and reverted to its original title. Haydn Dimmock, who had been editor of The Scout at Pearson's since 1919, was taken onto the Headquarters staff and encouraged to develop the Scouting content. Dimmock resigned as editor in June 1954 shortly before his death and was replaced by Rex Hazlewood. Eventually, falling sales led The Boy Scouts Association's Committee of the Council to order the closure of the magazine and it ceased publication with the last issue on 3 September 1966. Some regular features from The Scout transferred to The Scouter.

=== The Wolf Cub (1916–?), The Trail (1918–1923) and The Rover World (1934-1939) ===
Other, less successful magazines were also introduced by The Boy Scout Association. The Wolf Cub, aimed at 8 to 11 year-old boys in the Wolf Cubs, was launched in 1916. The Trail, for over 18 year-old participants in the Rovers, was started in 1918. The Trail was merged with the Headquarters Gazette in 1923 and The Wolf Cub magazine later merged with The Scout. In 1934, another national magazine for Rover Scouts was launched as The Rover World, based on a successful publication for Rovers in the County of London called London Rover. It ran until October 1937, but special supplements under the same title appeared in The Scouter during 1938.

== History ==
=== Headquarters Gazette (1909–1923) ===
In July 1909 Baden-Powell established a monthly publication for adult Scouters titled Headquarters Gazette. The Gazette gave Baden-Powell a direct link to the adults in Scouting that was not controlled by Pearson and he wrote a column called Outlook in almost every issue. The Gazette was renamed The Scouter in 1923. It was edited from 1911 onwards by H. Geoffrey Elwes.

=== The Scouter (1923–1971) ===
In January 1923, The Headquarters Gazette was renamed The Scouter. It had an initial circulation of 14,000 and a cover price of 3d, which was eventually raised to 6d in 1947. Rex Hazlewood was appointed editor in 1944, a position he would hold until his retirement in 1968. Following cessation of publication of The Scout magazine in 1966, The Scouter took on some of its features and some similar content. The magazine was renamed Scouting in January 1971.

=== Scouting (1971–2020) ===
Scouting was available by subscription or could be bought at a newsagent. In October 2004, Scouting was relaunched in A5 size and sent free to adult leaders and officers of The Scout Association. In 2013, the magazine had an average circulation of 116,700 copies. Although plans were being developed to replace Scouting with other means of support online, this change was accelerated by the COVID-19 pandemic and the last issue was published digitally and distributed by email in autumn 2020. There is now a "Scout and Scouting" magazine but it is an independent publication originating from the United Kingdom.
