= Scouting for Boys =

Book on Boy Scout training

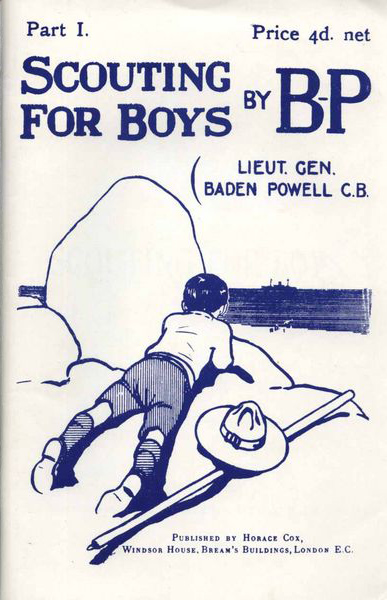
- Cover of first part of Scouting For Boys, January 1908
- Author: Robert Baden-Powell
- Illustrator: Robert Baden-Powell
- Cover artist: John Hassall
- Language: English
- Subject: Scouting
- Genre: Boy's handbook
- Published: 24 January 1908 Horace Cox
- Publication place: United Kingdom
- OCLC: 492503066

Scouting for Boys: A handbook for instruction in good citizenship is a book on Boy Scout training, published in various editions since 1908. Early editions were written and illustrated by Robert Baden-Powell with later editions being extensively rewritten by others. The book was originally a manual for self-instruction in observation, tracking and woodcraft skills as well as self-discipline and self-improvement, about the British Empire and duty as citizens with an eclectic mix of anecdotes and unabashed personal observations and recollections. It includes references to the author's own exploits. It is based on his boyhood experiences, his experience with the Mafeking Cadet Corps during the Second Boer War at the siege of Mafeking, and on his experimental camp on Brownsea Island, England.

== History ==
Scouting for Boys (1908) was Baden-Powell's rewrite of his earlier book Aids to Scouting (1899) with many youth training ideas openly taken from The Birch Bark Roll of the Woodcraft Indians (1906) written by Ernest Thompson Seton, who later became the Chief Scout of the Boy Scouts of America. Aids to Scouting was mostly a written explanation of the military scouting and self-reliance skills lessons Baden-Powell had learned from Frederick Russell Burnham, the British Army Chief of Scouts, but following the siege of Mafeking this military handbook unexpectedly became popular with many youth groups and educators, like Charlotte Mason, in Britain. At Mafeking, Baden-Powell's adjutant had recruited and trained boys aged 12–15 as cadets and during the siege they acted as postmen, messengers, and later to carry the wounded, to free men for fighting. Upon his return to England, following the Second Boer War, Baden-Powell learned some British schools had been using Aids to Scouting to teach observation and deduction. In 1906, Seton discussed youth training ideas with Baden-Powell and shared with him a copy of The Birch Bark Roll of the Woodcraft Indians. Soon after, Baden-Powell decided to revise Aids to Scouting into a book for boys. Several friends supported Baden-Powell, including Sir William Alexander Smith, founder of the Boys' Brigade, Cyril Arthur Pearson, who owned newspapers and printing presses, and the novelist Maria Fetherstonhaugh, who provided a quiet Wimbledon house where he could write. Baden-Powell wrote a draft, then called Boy Patrols, which he used and tested with 22 boys for one week at camp on Brownsea Island in the summer of 1907, where Pearson's literary editor Percy Everett assisted.

Scouting for Boys was published in six fortnightly instalments of approximately 70 pages each, from January to March 1908. They were produced by Pearson's printer, Horace Cox. These six publications were a success and, as planned, were issued in book form on 1 May 1908. Although Aids to Scouting strongly influenced the book, Scouting for Boys presents Scouting from the perspective of outdoorsmen and explorers rather than military men, and it adds the Scout Oath, Scout Law, honours and games for youth. The book was revised and an enormous variety of editions were published. Many of these editions were edited by others and, far beyond mere editing, whole sections were written by authors other than Baden-Powell. The book was a best seller upon release, and, in its various editions, is claimed to have become one of the best-selling books in history. Scouting for Boys has been translated into many languages. In 1948, editions of the book were still selling 50,000 copies annually. Only in 1967 was a decline noted by the publisher and in the last decades of the 20th century the book came to be seen as a period curiosity even by the Scout Movement. It is claimed to be the fourth bestselling book of the 20th century. A realistic estimate is that approximately 4 million copies of the UK edition have been sold. Extrapolating this to 87 different language editions worldwide, historic world sales of Scouting for Boys can be estimated at 100 to 150 million copies since 1908.

In her introduction to the 2005 edition, Elleke Boehmer criticises the book saying "the text was deeply scored through with a contemporary class prejudice which would have been off-putting to non-middle-class readers, as captured in the sharp aphorism that bees form a 'model community, for they respect their Queen and kill their unemployed' (p. 117) Character observation in many ways meant reading for the signs of working-class poverty."

== Editions ==
Scouting for Boys has been published in over thirty consecutive editions by London based C. Arthur Pearson Ltd., and it is translated to all the major languages of the world. Estimatedly, over 100 million books have been printed, making it rank high in the list of best-selling books. The internet page www.scoutingforboysroundtheworld.org has identified more than 300 different editions and included them in a database accessible via this internet page. Users can also add missing editions to the database themselves.

=== British editions ===
- Scouting for Boys (First published ed.). London, Windsor House, Bream's Buildings, E.C.: Horace Cox (printer for C.A. Pearson). January–March 1908. pp. six instalments of approx 70 pages each.
- Scouting for Boys (1st bookform, cloth-bound ed.). London, Henrietta Street: C. Arthur Pearson Ltd. 1 May 1908. pp. 288 pages.
- Scouting for Boys (2nd revised ed.). London: C. Arthur Pearson Ltd. June 1909. pp. 310 pages. plus advertisements
- Scouting for Boys (3rd enlarged ed.). London: C. Arthur Pearson Ltd. July 1910.
- Scouting for Boys (4th enlarged and revised ed.). London: C. Arthur Pearson Ltd. October 1911.
- Scouting for Boys (5th ed.). London: C. Arthur Pearson Ltd. November 1912.
- Scouting for Boys (6th ed.). London: C. Arthur Pearson Ltd. April 1913.
- Scouting for Boys (7th ed.). London: C. Arthur Pearson Ltd. December 1913.
- Scouting for Boys (8th ed.). London: C. Arthur Pearson Ltd. January 1916. pp. 352 pages.
- Scouting for Boys (9th ed.). London: C. Arthur Pearson Ltd. May 1918. pp. 334 pages.
- Scouting for Boys (11th ed.). London, Tower House: C. Arthur Pearson Ltd. 1924. pp. 338 pages.
- Scouting for Boys (12th ed.). London: C. Arthur Pearson Ltd. 1926. pp. 338 pages.
- Scouting for Boys (13th ed.). London: C. Arthur Pearson Ltd. January 1928. pp. 338 pages.
- Baden-Powell's Scouting for Boys (Boy's ed.). London: C. Arthur Pearson Ltd. 1932. pp. 226 pages.
- Sgowtio i Fechgyn gan Arglwydd Baden-Powell o Gilwel (Argraffiad y Bechgyn ed.). Caerfyrddin: W. Spurrell a'i Fab. 1932. pp. 232 pages.
- Baden-Powell's Scouting for Boys (Memorial 22nd ed.). London: C. Arthur Pearson Ltd. 1944. pp. 328 pages.
- Baden-Powell's Scouting for Boys (30th ed.). London: C. Arthur Pearson Ltd. 1957. pp. 328 pages.
- Scouting for Boys (33rd ed.). London: C. Arthur Pearson Ltd. 1961. pp. 330 pages.
- Scouting for Boys (abridged ed.). London: The Boy Scouts Association. 1963. pp. 182 pages.
- Scouting for Boys (paperback ed.). The Scout Association. 1998. ISBN 0-85165-247-6.
- Elleke Boehmer, ed. (2004). Scouting for Boys (hard cover ed.). Oxford: Oxford University Press. ISBN 0-19-280547-9.
- Elleke Boehmer, ed. (June 2005). Scouting for Boys (paperback ed.). Oxford/New York: Oxford University Press. pp. 448 pages. ISBN 0-19-280246-1.

=== Other editions ===
- Scouting for Boys (Special Canadian ed.). Ottawa: The Boy Scouts Association. 1939. pp. 334 pages.
- Jan Schaap, ed. (1944). Het verkennen voor jongens (in Dutch) (5th, cloth bound ed.). 's-Gravenhage: De Nederlandsche Padvinders. pp. 269 pages.
- Scouting for Boys in India (1st Indian ed.). General Headquarters of the Boy Scout Association in India. 1946. pp. 316 pages.
- Scouting for Boys (World Brotherhood ed.). Boy Scouts of America for and on behalf of the Boy Scouts International Bureau. 1946. pp. 328 pages.
- Het verkennen voor jongens (in Dutch) (6th, hard cover ed.). 's-Gravenhage: Nationale Padvindersraad. c. 1950. pp. 395 pages.
- Scouting for Boys. Boy Scouts of Canada. 1973. pp. 331 pages.
- Mir Mohammad Mohsin, ed. (1973). Scouting brā'ē tiflān (in Urdu). Islamabad: National Book Foundation.
- Theo P.M. Palstra, ed. (1977). Verkennen voor jeugd (in Dutch) (10th, paperback ed.). Amersfoort: Scouting Nederland. pp. 301 pages.
- Fausto Catani, ed. (1978). Scautismo per ragazzi (in Italian). Milan: Ancora. pp. 438 pages.
- Baden-Powell's Scouting for Boys (Brownsea jubilee ed.). Boy Scouts of America. 1982. ISBN 0-8395-3591-0.
- P.V. Paulose, ed. (1982). Skauttingu-kuttikalkku (in Malayalam). Trivandrum: Bharat Scouts and Guides. pp. 456 pages.
- Pfadfinder: ein Handbuch der Erziehung (in German) (13th ed.). Bern: Pfadfinder-Materialbüro. 1983. pp. 315 pages.
- Frithiof Dahlby, ed. (1983). Scouting for Boys (in Swedish). Stockholm: Scoutförl. pp. 192 pages.
- Paula Koho, ed. (1986). Partiopojan kirja (in Finnish) (3rd ed.). Helsinki: Partiokirja. pp. 350 pages.
- Stanisław Kapiszewski, ed. (1990). Skauting dla chłopców : wychowanie dobrego obywatela metodą puszczańską (in Polish). Warsaw: Oficyna Przeglądu Powszechnego. pp. 375 pages.
- József Illy, ed. (1994). Cserkészet fiúknak: kézikönyv a jó állampolgár neveléséhez az erdőjárás révén (in Hungarian). Budapest: M. Cserkészcsapatok Szövets. pp. 277 pages.
- José Francisco dos Santos, ed. (May 1993). Escutismo para rapazes (in Portuguese). Lisbon: Corpo Nacional de Escutas. pp. 310 pages.
- Peter Bleeser, ed. (1996). Pfadfinder (in German) (3rd ed.). Neuss: Georgs-Verlag. pp. 309 pages.
- R. Chandrasekharan, ed. (2000). Bālakarigāgi skauting (in Kannada). Bangalore: Navakarnataka. pp. 321 pages.
- Kevin Y.L. Tan, ed. (2004). Scouting for Boys (in Malay) (hard cover ed.). Singapore: Brownsea Singapore. ISBN 981-05-1830-7.
- B. Ramachandran, LT(S), ed. (2008). Siruvar Saaraniyam (Tamil) (in Tamil). Chennai: BRJB Publishers. pp. 335 pages.
- Scouting for Boys – cercetășia pe înțelesul tuturor (in Romanian). Scout Shop. 2017. pp. 280 pages. ISBN 978-973-0-25814-1.

== Contents ==
All parts of the six installments in 1908 have the title Scouting for Boys in big capitals. With a listed price of '4d. net', it was affordable to many boys, many of whom would have been at work, as the school-leaving age was 14. Authorship is attributed thus: 'by B-P (Lieut. Gen. Baden Powell C.B.)' (sic).

Most chapters start with hints to instructors. All chapters have campfire yarns, appealing to boys, most contain sections with games and activities, and they close with recommendations for books to read.

=== Part I. Scoutcraft ===
The first installment contains pages 3 to 70. It provides the basic details of Scouting.

1	Mafeking boy scouts, Scouts' work, "Kim", Books
2	Summary of Scout's course of instruction, the Elsdon murder
3	Boy Scouts' organisation, the scout's oath, Scout's salute and secret sign, Scout's uniform, Scout's war songs, patrol signs
4	Scout law, Scouting games, Scout's play

=== Part II. Tracking, Woodcraft ===
The second part covers pages 71 to 142. It contains chapter II on tracking and chapter III on woodcraft, each with three camp fire yarns.

5	Observation of "sign", Noticing sign, Details of people, Signs round a dead body, Details in the country, Using your eyes, Books to read on observation, hints to instructors, Games in observation
6	Spooring, Men's tracks, hints to spooring, hints to instructors, Tracking games, Books to read on spooring
7	Reading "sign" or deduction, Instances of deduction, Hints to instructors, Example of practice in deduction, Books to read
8	Stalking, How to hide yourself, How to teach stalking, Games in stalking, Books on stalking
9	Animals, Birds, Reptiles and fishes, Insects, Hints to instructors, Honours, Lion hunting, Books to read, Play
10	Plants, Trees, Hints for instructor, Games, Books to read, Play

=== Part III. Camp life, Campaigning ===
The third part covers pages 143 to 206. It contains chapter IV on camp life, and chapter V on campaigning.

11	Pioneering, Hut building, Felling trees, How to make bridges, Self measures, the Scout is always a handy-man, Hints to instructors, Books to read
12	Camping, Comfort in camp, Camp fires – the right way of making them, Tidiness, Hints to instructors
13	Camp life, Cooking, Bread making, Cattle-driving and slaughtering, Cleanliness, Water, Hints to instructors, Camp games, Book to read
14	Life in the open, Exploration, Boat cruising, Watermanship, Mountaineering, Patrolling, Night work, Weather wisdom, Hints to instructors, Games, Books on life in the open
15	Pathfinding, Judging heights and distances, Finding the North, Hints to instructors, Games in pathfinding, Books to read
16	Information by signal, Signalling, Whistle and flag signals, Practices in signalling, Hints to instructors, Marks towards badges of honour in campaigning, Dispatch running, Display

=== Part IV. Endurance and chivalry ===
The fourth part covers pages 207 to 270. It contains chapter VI Endurance for Scouts, or How to be strong, and chapter VII Chivalry of the knights.

17	How to grow strong: A Scout's endurance, Exercises and their object, The nose, Ears, Eyes, Teeth, Hints to instructors, Games to develop strength, Books to read
18	Health-giving habits: How to keep healthy, Keep yourself clean, Smoking, Drinking, Early rising, Smile, Practices, Books to read
19	Prevention of disease: Camp doctoring, Microbes and how to fight them, Food, Clothing, Practices, Games, Books to read
20	Chivalry of the knights: Chivalry to others, St. George, The knights' code, Unselfishness, Self-sacrifice, Kindness, Tips, Friendliness, Politeness, Courtesy to women, Practices, Hints to instructors, Games, Play, Books to read
21	Self-discipline: To instructors, Honour, Obedience and discipline, Courage, Good temper and cheeriness, Books to read, Practice in self-discipline, Games
22	Self-improvement:To instructors, Duty to God, Thrift, How to make money, How to get on, Practices in self-improvement, Information on professions, etc, Books to read, (in part V:) Sobriety, Practise observation, Fortitude, Notes to instructors,

=== Part V. Saving life and patriotism ===
The fifth part covers pages 271 to 334. It contains chapter VIII Saving life, or how to deal with accidents, and chapter IX Patriotism, or our duties as citizens.

23	Be prepared for accidents: Hints to instructors, The knights of St. John, Life-saving medals, Practice for life saving
24	Accidents and how to deal with them: Panics, Rescue from fire, Directions, Rescue from drowning, Rescue from runaway horses, Miscellaneous accidents, Mad dog, Practices in life-saving, Books to read
25	Helping others: Rendering first aid, Snake bite, Grit in the eye, Suicides, How to carry a patient, How to practice, Games, Books to read
26	Our empire: Hints to instructors, Our empire, How our empire grew, how the empire must be held, Hints to instructors, Books to read, Display
27	Citizenship: Scout's duty as a citizen, Duties as citizen-soldier, Marksmanship, Helping police, Hints to instructors, Games, Books to read
28	United we stand, divided we fall: Hints to instructors, Our Navy and Army, Our flag, Our government, Our King, Books to read

=== Part VI. Notes for instructors, Scouting games, practices, and displays ===
The sixth part covers pages 335 to 398. It contains Notes to instructors and Scouting games, practices, and displays.

Play the game: don't look on, The British Empire wants your help, Fall of the Roman Empire was due to bad citizenship, Bad citizenship is becoming apparent in this country to-day, Football, Our future citizens, Peace-Scouting, Militarism, How to teach Scouting, Authorities who might find the scheme useful, Hints to instructors, Be Prepared, Clubroom, The handbook, Course of instruction, Method of instruction, Imagination, Responsibility to juniors, Discipline, Religion, Continence, Hints to instructors, Forming character, Conclusion, Books on the subject
Notes to instructors, Scoutcraft, Tracking, Woodcraft, Camp life, Books to read, Campaigning and pathfinding, Endurance and health, Chivalry, Saving life and first aid, Patriotism, Play the game!, The storming of Delhi, The Maple Leaf Forever, The song of Australia, God bless the Prince of Wales, God save the King, Sample programme of athletics sports, Non-Scouting games, Basket ball, Books to read
Suggestions for a display
True scouting stories
Corrections

== Copyright status ==
Copyright to Scouting for Boys expired on 31 December 2011, at the end of the 70th year after the death of its author on 8 January 1941 and the book is now in the public domain. Baden-Powell had given his copyright to the book to The Scout Association which owned the copyright in the UK, until it expired. The Boy Scouts of America was granted a copyright licence by Baden-Powell himself for their Boy Scout Handbook, written during the BSA's formal founding in 1910.

== See also ==
- The Wolf Cub's Handbook (1916), for Wolf Cubs (Cub Scouts)
- Rovering to Success (1922), for Rovers
- Aids to Scoutmastership (1920), for Scoutmasters
- Baden-Powell (1989) – biography of Baden-Powell
