= Gilwell Ada's Hoeve =

Scouting campsite in Ommen, the Netherlands

- Owner: Scouting Nederland
- Location: Ommen
- Country: Netherlands
- Coordinates: 52°30.871′N 06°24.128′E
- Founded: 9 July 1923; First use 1913
- Founder: Philip baron van Pallandt
- Website http://www.adashoeve.nl

Gilwell Ada's Hoeve is one of the oldest Dutch national Scouting campsites, and from July 1923 until the 1960s hosted the Wood Badge trainings for Scouting leadership in the Netherlands. The site was founded as a Scouting campsite in 1923 by Philip baron van Pallandt on his Eerde Estate in Ommen. One of the largest Dutch sites of Scouting Nederland, it covers 45 hectares, and has 25 camping fields and other accommodation, hosting approximately 10,000 camping nights annually.

== History ==
On 8 September 1853, Ada countess van Rechteren van Appeltern traditionally started a toll house, which later became known as Ada's Farmhouse (Dutch: Ada's Hoeve). It was purchased in 1911 by R baron van Pallandt van Eerde, to be part of his Eerde Estate. Upon his death his nephew Philip baron van Pallandt inherited the estate. Philip was a keen Scouter and invited Scouts to camp on his estate by 1913. Camp Eerde was popular with 2500 camper nights in 1920, and 15,000 in 1924. Late 1922, Ada's Hoeve was dedicated to Scouting use, and on 9 July 1923, the Dutch Chief Scout (Dutch: Hoofdverkenner) J.J. Rambonnet formally opened it.

From the start, the site was leased to De Nederlandsche Padvinders, who became full owner in 1935. In the subsequent years, several additions were done, including the model Scout group house Rambonnet house in 1948, and in the 1950s the campfire area, warehouse, offices, and the ornamental entrance gates. In 1993, the Rambonnet house was destroyed by fire. Two years later, the 18th World Scout Jamboree was organized in nearby Dronten. After the jamboree, the jamboree headquarters was dismantled and re-erected on the site of the former Rambonnet house, and renamed Jamboree house, serving again as Scout group accommodation.

Following the success of Scouting leadership training on Gilwell Park from 1919 onward, Wood Badge training, also known as Gilwell training, was organized also in other countries. Ada's Hoeve was one of the first Gilwell training centers outside the British Empire. The first training was held in July 1923 by Scoutmaster Jan Schaap, close after official opening of the site. Since then, the site is known as Gilwell Ada's Hoeve. The Gilwell training continued on Gilwell Ada's Hoeve until 1975, after which all Gilwell trainings were hosted at Gilwell St. Walrick, where the Katholieke Verkenners (Catholic Boy Scouts) had had their Gilwell trainings from 1950. From the 1990s, the Gilwell trainings of Scouting Nederland are organized on Scout Centre Buitenzorg in Baarn.

== Scouting campsite ==
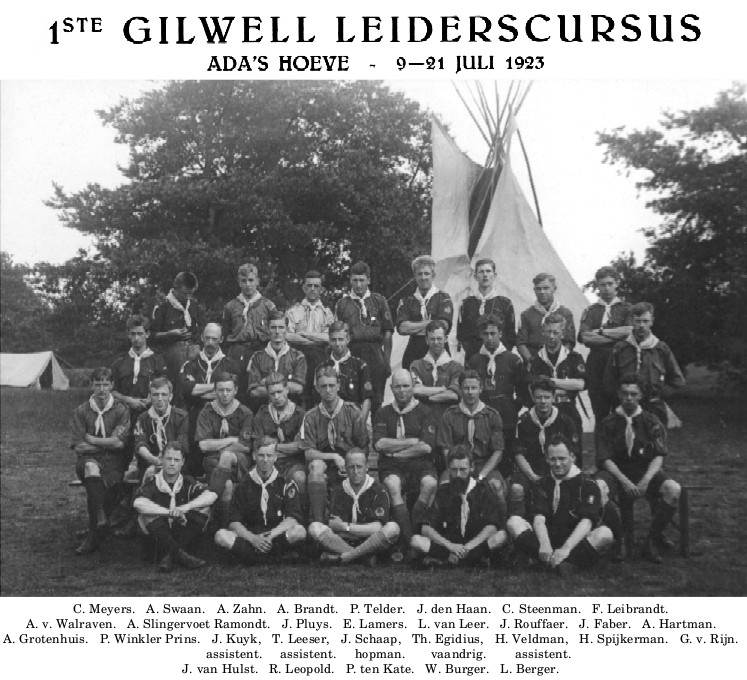
Group picture first Wood Badge training in Ommen

Ada's Hoeve can host over 600 Scouts on 25 camping fields and housing accommodation. As such, it is the one but largest Scouting campsite in the Netherlands. It has always complied with the quality requirements of Scouting Nederland to their campsites, and is therefore a certified Labelled Site (Dutch: Labelterrein).

The campfields (capacity 10 to 120 campers) all have historic names, given by and after the first users of these fields. E.g., the First and Second Leader Fields (Dutch: Leidersveld) were used in the Woodbadge training, and the Young Scouts Field (Dutch: Jonge Verkenners) was first used by the first Dutch Scout Group. In total the fields have a combined capacity of approximately 1000 Scouts.

The site hosts several interesting views. They include a 13 meter high totempole, which was a gift in 1960 by the visiting 34th Sea Scouts group based at Perak House in Singapore, that carved and painted it. There is also the ornamental gates to the Leader Fields, created by the Delftsche Zwervers, which were used in Wood Badge training ceremonies. Other provisions on the site include a small formal Scout shop, and site offices.
