= Rex Hazlewood =

British official of The Scout Association (1903–1985)

- Rex Hazlewood
- Born: Rex Denys Michael Hazlewood; 22 August 1903; Middlesex, England
- Died: 1985 (aged 81–82)
- Occupations: Editor of The Scout and The Scouter magazines
- Known for: Long-serving official of The Boy Scouts Association of the United Kingdom
- Notable work: The Campfire Leader's Book, Scout Camps: A Book for Scouters, The Gilwell Camp Fire Book: Songs and yells from fifty years of Scouting

Rex D. M. Hazlewood (born 22 August 1903) was a long-serving official of The Boy Scouts Association of the United Kingdom and was its editor of The Scout and The Scouter magazines and author of articles, pamphlets and books on Scouting.

== Background ==
Hazlewood was appointed editor of The Scouter magazine in 1944, a position he would hold until his retirement in 1968.

From June 1954 through September 1966, Hazlewood was the editor of The Scout magazine.

Hazlewood wrote a number of instructional Scouting books, primarily on the subject of Scoutcraft. Many of his books were co-authored with his friend John Thurman. In 1961, he co-authored B-P's Scouts: an official history of The Boy Scouts Association.

== Works ==
- Hazlewood, Rex; Arkill, Leslie, eds. (1948). Public Occasions. Boy Scouts Association. OCLC 810657939.
- Hazlewood, Rex; Thurman, John (1949). The Campfire Leader's Book. Hall Press. ISBN 9781446539712.
- Hazlewood, Rex; Thurman, John (1952). Scout Camps: A Book for Scouters. Boy Scouts Association.
- Hazlewood, Rex; Thurman, John (1957). The Gilwell Camp Fire Book: Songs and yells from fifty years of Scouting.
- Hazlewood, Rex (1958). The Scoutmaster's guide from A to Z. "revised and retitled in 1968 as The Scout leader's guide from A to Z"
- Hazlewood, Rex; Thurman, John (1959). Some Training Ideas for Scouts.
- Hazlewood, Rex; Thurman, John (1960). Camping.
- 1961: Hazlewood, Rex (1961). Camping for Boys and Girls. Read Books Design. ISBN 9781445519449.
- Hazlewood, Rex; Collis, Henry; Fred Hurll (1961). B-P's Scouts: an official history of The Boy Scouts Association. London: Colins. OCLC 17594720.
- The Scout Annual – 1962. C. Arthur Pearson Ltd. 1962. OCLC 17594720.
- Hazlewood, Rex; Thurman, John (1962). The Second Gilwell Camp Fire Book: A further collection of songs and yells from fifty years of Scouting.
- Hazlewood, Rex; Thurman, John (1964). Summer Camp All Year Round.
- Hazlewood, Rex; Thurman, John (1969). The Gilwell Story.
