= Philip van Pallandt =

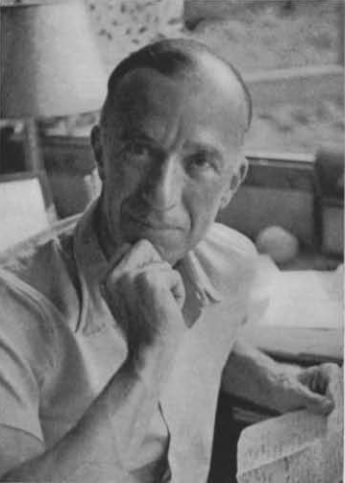
Philip van Pallandt

Philip Dirk baron van Pallandt, heer van Eerde (28 December 1889 – 1 November 1979) was a Scoutmaster in the early years of Dutch scouting. He was the owner of Gilwell Ada's Hoeve on his Eerde Estate, which he gave to Scouting in 1923.

== Biography ==
By birth, he belonged to an old noble Pallandt family. In 1924, Baron Philip van Pallandt deeded the Eerde castle to the Order of the Star in the East, an organization connected to the famous philosopher and spiritual teacher Jiddu Krishnamurti, of whom the baron was an avid follower.
