= Delftsche Zwervers =

Dutch student organization

Coordinates: 51.99275°N 4.36789°E

- Delft Rovers Student Crew
- Headquarters: Kruithuis
- Location: Delft
- Country: Netherlands
- Founded: 11 October 1920; First activities 1915
- Affiliation: Scouting Nederland
- Website www.delftschezwervers.nl

The Studentenstam De Delftsche Zwervers (Delft Rovers Student Crew) is a student society in Delft, Netherlands. Dating from 1915, it is the world's oldest student Scouting group, first as a club for former Scouts, from 1920 as a Rover crew. They are housed in the Scout Centre "Kruithuis", the monumental gunpowder ammunition dump of the Dutch Republic, designed in 1660 by Pieter Post. The members are students at the Delft University of Technology and other higher education institutions.

== History ==
Blue and Black Group neckerchief

On 11 October 1920 the Delftsche Zwervers were founded as a Rover crew for students. The society succeeded De Delftsche Studentenclub van Oud-Padvinders, (Dutch: Delft Student club of former Scouts) which had been formed on 8 November 1915. Until the end of the 1960s, the society was deeply rooted in Scouting, but always critical of the national Scouting organisation. Later the group developed to a student society, albeit still a member of Scouting Nederland. Taking the founding date as that of De Delftsche Studentenclub van Oud-Padvinders in 1915, the Delftsche Zwervers is the oldest student Scouting Group in the world. This title has also been claimed by the Oxford University Scout and Guide Group, which was founded in 1919 and is certainly the oldest student Scouting Group in the United Kingdom.

The crew was founded as the third Rover crew in the Netherlands. A large influence on the work of the first Rover crews were the books of John Hargrave (White Fox). On 11 and 12 June 1921 he was the instructor in a Rover camp in Ommen attended by the Delftsche Zwervers. Despite the "higher" layers thought Service was more important, Woodcraft remained in the first years the main part of the program of the Rover crews.

Delftsche Zwervers were important in the organisation of many national and international events, for example the 5th World Scout Jamboree and the first Agoon, an international camp for handicapped Scouts, at the "Goudsberg", Lunteren, Netherlands in 1949.

Zwervers is the literal translation of Rovers, because of its negative associations, hobo, tramps, the age group was later officially named Voortrekkers, but the Delftsche Zwervers kept their original name.

The logo is a campfire, for Scouting, on a cog, for engineering.

== Housing and activities ==
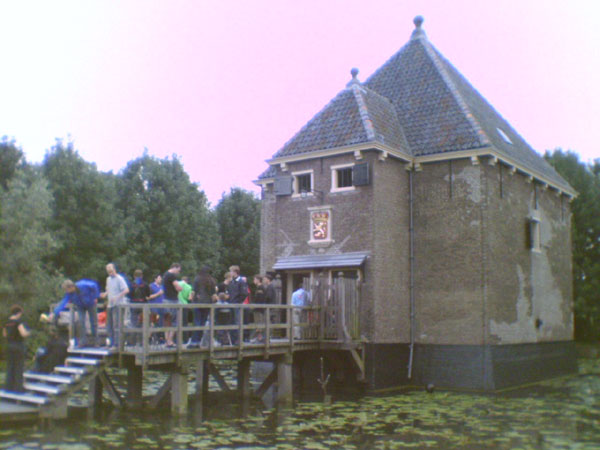
De Delftsche Zwervers on their pier after dinner

Since the mid-1960s, the Delftsche Zwervers, together with some other Scouting Delfland scout groups, are housed in the Scout Centre Kruithuis in Delft. The Kruithuis is the 17th century gunpowder ammunition dump of the Dutch Republic, designed in 1660 by Pieter Post. The walled and moated complex consist of a gatehouse, a former guardhouse and various outbuildings, formerly for gunpowder handling and packaging, around a large central pond with two gunpowder storage towers in the middle. In 1998–2000, the Kruithuis complex was restored. The Delftsche Zwervers are housed in one of the gunpowder storage towers.

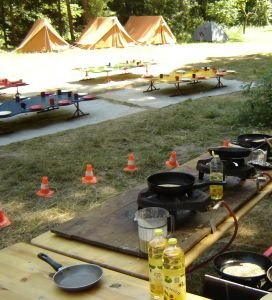
The campsite in Ommen

From time to time, each member of the Delftsche Zwervers organises an evening programme of his or her personal interest. As a result, the activities are diverse, including soldering with LEDs, playing with old computers, role-playing games, painting, sculpting in cellular concrete, pioneering, canoeing. Members frequently go outdoors, for example camping and doing odd jobs on the Scouting campsite Gilwell Ada's Hoeve or in the winter hiking in the Ardennes.

One recurring activity was the organisation of the annual camps for children on the Scouting campsite Gilwell Ada's Hoeve in Ommen, Netherlands. Since their establishment, the Delftsche Zwervers have aimed to contribute to society by organising activities for children in hardship situations. Beginning in 1922, members went camping with children from the Martha Stichting children's home in Alphen aan den Rijn and later with other groups like refugee children from East Germany. Later, however, members organized and led school camps for children in special education from a neighbouring city. These camps were two weeks long. Each week a group of approximately 28 children and approximately 14 leaders. The children were divided into groups of three to four, a "tent". For each tent was one leader directly responsible. The other leaders were two cooks, one "manus" (handyperson) responsible for the equipment, two leaders responsible for the games, one to two leaders as backup and one leader to keep order. In 2018, the organization of annual children's camps was discontinued because it became increasingly difficult to build long-term relationships with organizations in the target group. To replace the camps, starting in 2025, the Delftsche Zwervers organizes one of the HIT activities at Ada's Hoeve during Easter.
