= C. Arthur Pearson Ltd. =

British publisher

- Parent company: George Newnes Ltd. (1929–1960); Odhams Press (1960–1961); IPC (1961–c. 1965)
- Status: Defunct; absorbed into IPC in c. 1965
- Founded: 1890
- Founder: C. Arthur Pearson
- Country of origin: England
- Headquarters location: London
- Key people: Percy Everett, Lawson Wood, Hedley Le Bas
- Publication types: Newspapers, periodicals, books, comics

C. Arthur Pearson Ltd. was a British publisher of newspapers, periodicals, books, and comics that operated from 1890 to c. 1965. The company was founded by C. Arthur Pearson, later to be known as Sir Arthur Pearson, 1st Baronet.

Pearson was involved in the periodical business during its entire existence, known for publishing such titles as Pearson's Weekly, Home Notes, Pearson's Magazine, The Royal Magazine, London Opinion, and Men Only. The company was in the newspaper business from 1898 to 1916, most notably with the formation of the Daily Express. C. Arthur Pearson Ltd also published materials related to the British Boy Scout movement.

Initially an independent publisher, Pearson became an imprint of George Newnes Ltd around 1914. Newnes/Pearson was acquired by Odhams Press in 1960; all three companies became part of the International Publishing Company in 1961.

== History ==
In 1890, after six years of working for George Newnes, C. Arthur Pearson left to form his own publishing business.

Within three weeks of forming C. Arthur Pearson Ltd in 1890, the company began publishing the periodical journal Pearson's Weekly, the first issue of which sold a quarter of a million copies. In January 1894, Pearson launched the women's magazine Home Notes, with the aim of dominating the penny magazine market. In 1896, Pearson launched Pearson's Magazine, a monthly magazine which specialized in speculative literature, political discussion, often of a socialist bent, and the arts. In 1898, Pearson founded The Royal Magazine, a monthly literary magazine which remained in publication until 1939. London Opinion was launched in 1903, running until 1954, when it merged with Men Only (started in 1935).

Pearson also participated in the early British comics publishing business, launching Big Budget in 1897 and Dan Leno's Comic Journal in 1898.

Pearson was in the book business from 1897 to around 1945. In the latter years of the 19th century, Pearson published a number of notable first editions, including H. G. Wells' The Invisible Man (1897), Bram Stoker's Miss Betty (1898), and Baroness Orczy's The Emperor's Candlesticks (1899). Pearson published books by such writers as Winifred Graham, Percy F. Westerman, Norman Hunter, Fâ’iz El-Ghusein, Robert Leighton, Marie Connor, and Catherine Christian.

In 1898, Pearson purchased the Morning Herald, and in 1900 merged it into his new creation, the halfpenny Daily Express. The Express was a departure from the papers of its time and created an immediate impact by carrying news instead of only advertisements on its front page. Pearson was successful in establishing papers in provincial locations such as the Birmingham Daily Gazette. Pearson came into direct competition with the Daily Mail and in the resulting commercial fight almost took control of The Times, being nominated as its manager, but the deal fell through.

In 1904 Pearson purchased the struggling The Standard and its sister paper the Evening Standard for £700,000 from the Johnstone family. He merged the Evening Standard with his St James's Gazette and changed the Conservative stance of both papers into a pro-Liberal one, but was unsuccessful in arresting the slide in sales and in 1910 sold them to the MP Sir Davison Dalziel, and Sir Alexander Henderson. The Daily Express eventually passed, in November 1916, under the control of the Canadian–British tycoon Sir Max Aitken, later Lord Beaverbrook.

Reflecting its founder's support of the British Boy Scout movement, C. Arthur Pearson Ltd was responsible for a number of Scouting publications, including The Scout magazine, launched in 1908; the Scouting for Boys handbook, published in various editions beginning in 1908; and The Wolf Cub's Handbook, by Robert Baden-Powell, founder of the worldwide scouting movement (1916).

Beginning to lose his sight due to glaucoma despite a 1908 operation, C. Arthur Pearson was progressively forced from 1910 onwards to relinquish his newspaper interests.

=== Imprint of George Newnes Ltd ===
Pearson himself retained a cooperative relationship with his old employer, George Newnes Ltd, and by 1914, C. Arthur Pearson Ltd had essentially become an imprint of Newnes. With Pearson's death in 1921, this arrangement was formalized, and in 1929 Newnes purchased all outstanding shares of Pearson's company.

The Pearson imprint focused mostly on magazines from the 1930s through the 1950s, known for ongoing titles like Home Notes and London Opinion, as well as Men Only. Pearson dipped into the pulp magazine market with short-lived titles like Scoops (1934) and Fantasy (1938–1939). Pearson's Magazine, Pearson's Weekly, and The Royal Magazine were all canceled in 1939, on the eve of World War II.

Notable comics titles published by Pearson in the 1950s and early 1960s included the romance comics Mirabelle, The New Glamour, and Marty; and the Picture Stories and Picture Library series.

=== Acquisition by Odhams and then IPC; closure ===
By 1959, Newness/Pearson was considered one of London's three leading magazine publishers — along with Odhams Press and the Hulton Press; that year Odhams acquired both of its rivals. In 1961, Newnes/Pearson became part of the International Publishing Corporation.

The Pearson imprint disappeared sometime around 1965.

== Notable publications ==
=== Periodicals ===
- The Boy's Leader — a story paper
- Glamour (725 issues, 1942–1956) — turned into The New Glamour
- Home Notes (1894–1958)
- London Opinion (1903–1954)
- Men Only (1935–c. 1965; continued by other publishers)
- Pearson's Magazine (1896–1939)
- Pearson's Weekly (1890–1939)
- The Royal Magazine (1898–1939)
- Scoops (10 February 1934 – 23 June 1934)
- The Scout (1908–1939; continued by The Boy Scouts Association)

=== Newspapers ===
- Daily Express (1900–1916; sold to Beaverbrook Newspapers)
- Morning Herald (1898–1900; merged into Daily Express)
- St James's Gazette (1903–1905; merged into Evening Standard)
- The Standard / Evening Standard (1904–1910; sold to Davison Dalziel)

=== Books ===
- The Emperor's Candlesticks by Baroness Orczy (1899)
- The Invisible Man by H. G. Wells (1897)
- Martyred Armenia by Fâ’iz El-Ghusein (1917)
- Miss Betty by Bram Stoker (1898)
- Pearson's Easy Dictionary (1912)
- Scouting for Boys (various editions, 1908–1961)
- Victory Over Blindness: How it Was Won by the Men of St Dunstan's by C. Arthur Pearson (1919)
- The Wolf Cub's Handbook by Robert Baden-Powell (1916)
- Amusements for the Home series:
  - The Drawing Room Entertainer by Cecil H. Bullivant (1903)
  - Magic Made Easy by David Devant (1903)
  - After-Dinner Sleights and Pocket Tricks by C. Lang Neil (1904)
  - Modern Card Manipulation by C. Lang Neil (1906)
  - Tricks for Everyone by David Devant (1910)
  - The New Book of Puzzles by C. Arthur Pearson (1911)
  - Indoor Games for Children and Young People by E. M. Baker (1912)
  - Simple Conjuring Tricks by Will Goldston (1913)
  - The Complete Book of Hand Shadows by Louis Nikola (1913)
  - Card Tricks without Sleight of Hand or Apparatus by L. Widdop (1914)
  - Conjuring with Coins by T. Nelson Downs edited by Nathan Dean (1916)
  - Pearson's Humorous Reciter (1918)
  - Fun on the Billiard Table by Stancliffe (1919)
  - Paper Magic by Will Blyth (1920)
  - Chemical Magic by V. E. Johnson (1920)
  - Match-Stick Magic by Will Blyth (1921)
  - Ventriloquism and Juggling by Harold C. King & E. T. John (1921)
  - Handkerchief Magic by Will Blyth (1922)
  - Water Wizardry by Arthur Ainslie (1922)
  - Have You Heard this One? by Charles Vivian (1922)
  - More Paper Magic by Will Blyth (1923)
  - Simplified Conjuring for All by Norman Hunter (1923)
  - The Pearson Puzzle Book by Mr X (1923)
  - Impromptu Conjuring Without Apparatus by Will Blyth (1924)
  - The Amateur Performer by W. J. Seymour (1924)
  - My Mysteries by Ivor C. Smith (1924)
  - New And Easy Magic by Norman Hunter (1925)
  - Money Magic - Entertaining Tricks & Amusements with Coins by Will Blyth (1926)
  - Original Magic for All by Bert Douglas (1927)
  - Broadcast Conjuring Tricks by Cyril Shields (1930)
  - The Best Tricks and How to Do Them by David Devant (1931)

=== Comic books ===
- Big Budget (614 issues, 1897–1909)
- Dan Leno's Comic Journal (93 issues, 26 February 1898 – 2 December 1899)
- Mirabelle (10 September 1956-c. 1965; continued by IPC/Fleetway until 1977)
- The New Glamour (103 issues, 16 October 1956 – 1958) — continuation of the non-comics periodical Glamour (1942–1956)
- Marty (162 issues, 23 January 1960 – 23 February 1963; merged into Mirabelle)
- Picture Library series:
  - English Heart Beat Picture Library (11 issues, 1965–[1966])
  - Film Picture Library (3 issues, 1 July 1959 – 1959)
  - Hospital Nurse Picture Library (42 issues, 1964–[December 1965])
  - Picture Romance Library (414 issues, October 1956–[1959])
  - Sea War Picture Library (14 issues, 1962)
  - Secret Agent Picture Library (20 issues, 1961–?)
  - Western Picture Library (92 issues, 1958–1962; 4 issues ([March 1965]–1965?)
- Picture Stories series:
  - Air War Picture Stories (54 issues, February 1961 – 1962)
  - Picture Stories of World War II (85 issues, 1960–?)
  - Private-Eye Picture Stories (18 issues, 1963–?)
  - T. V. Picture Stories (57 issues, [June 1958]–March 1960)
  - Wild West Picture Stories (1 issue, May 1960)
  - Young Lovers Picture Story Library (26 issues, 1958–July 1959)

== Sources ==
- Pearson at the Grand Comics Database
