= Miss Betty =

1898 novel by Bram Stoker

- First edition
- Author: Bram Stoker
- Language: English
- Genre: Romance
- Publisher: C. Arthur Pearson Ltd.
- Publication date: 1898
- Publication place: UK
- Media type: Print (Hardcover)
- Pages: 202

Miss Betty is a romance novel by Bram Stoker, written and published in 1898 in London by Arthur Pearson. It was published one year after the release of Stoker's Dracula.

== Background ==
Part of the novel was written in 1891, then titled Seven Golden Buttons. Most of this material was reused in Miss Betty. The original manuscript was published in 2015.

It is a historical romance and suspense novel that takes place in the 18th century. It is about Betty Pole, a young woman who inherits a fortune. She learns that she has a psychic ability to sense events before they happen. The novel revolves around her romance with Rafe, who saves her life.

== Online texts ==
- Bram Stoker Online Full PDF version of this novel.
