= Mafeking Cadet Corps =

Forerunner of the Boy Scouts

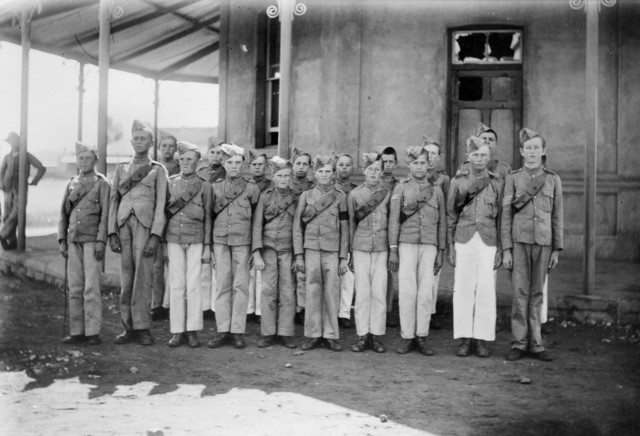
- The Mafeking Cadets, with their leader Sergeant-Major Warner Goodyear on the right.

The Mafeking Cadet Corps was a group of boy cadets formed by Lord Edward Cecil shortly before the 217 day Siege of Mafeking in South Africa during the Second Boer War in 1899–1900. Cecil, the son of the British prime minister, was the staff officer and second-in-command of the garrison. The cadets consisted of volunteer boys below fighting age and were used to support the troops, carry messages, and help in the hospital. This freed up men for military duties, and kept the boys occupied.

The cadets were given khaki uniforms, a wide-brimmed hat which they wore with one side turned up and a Glengarry cap. The towns people often commented on their smartness. 13-year-old Sergeant-Major Warner Goodyear was their leader.

The Mafeking Cadets are claimed to be one of the inspirations for the Boy Scouts.

== Cadet duties ==
One of the cadets' duties was to carry messages around the town and to outlying forts, sometimes as much as a mile away across open ground. At first they used donkeys, but as the siege ran on, food became scarce and the donkeys were killed and eaten. From then on, the cadets used bicycles instead.

Another important duty was to act as lookouts, mainly to warn the townspeople when the Boer siege guns were aimed and fired at different parts of the town.

The town produced its own postage stamps, known as "Mafeking Blues", for postage during the siege. One set depicted the cadet leader Warner Goodyear seated on a bicycle. The Mafeking stamps were unusual among the stamps of the British Empire at that time, because they did not depict the monarch.

Frankie Brown, a nine-year-old boy, was killed by a shell during the siege, and is sometimes claimed as a cadet casualty, although it is unlikely that he was a cadet. The youngest cadets on the nominal roll were aged 11.

At the end of the siege, 24 cadets were awarded the Defence of Mafeking bar to the Queen's South Africa Medal.

== Inspiration for Boy Scouts ==
Robert Baden-Powell was the British commander during the siege of Mafeking. He was impressed by the cadets and wrote of them in the opening pages of his 1908 book, Scouting for Boys. Baden-Powell related the following conversation with one of the cadets: I said to one of these boys on one occasion, when he came in through rather a heavy fire: 'You will get hit one of these days riding about like that when shells are flying'. And he replied 'I pedal so quick, Sir, they'd never catch me'.
