= Van Pallandt =

Original Coat of arms of the Pallandt family: "Barry of six pieces sable and or", part of German and Dutch nobility

The Pallandt family or von Pallandt or van Pallandt is an old European noble family, tracing back their aristocratic ancestry back to 1316 when Rüdiger von Pallandt was first documented in Geldern, North Rhine-Westphalia, then part of the Duchy of Guelders. The family belonged to both German and Dutch nobility.

== History ==
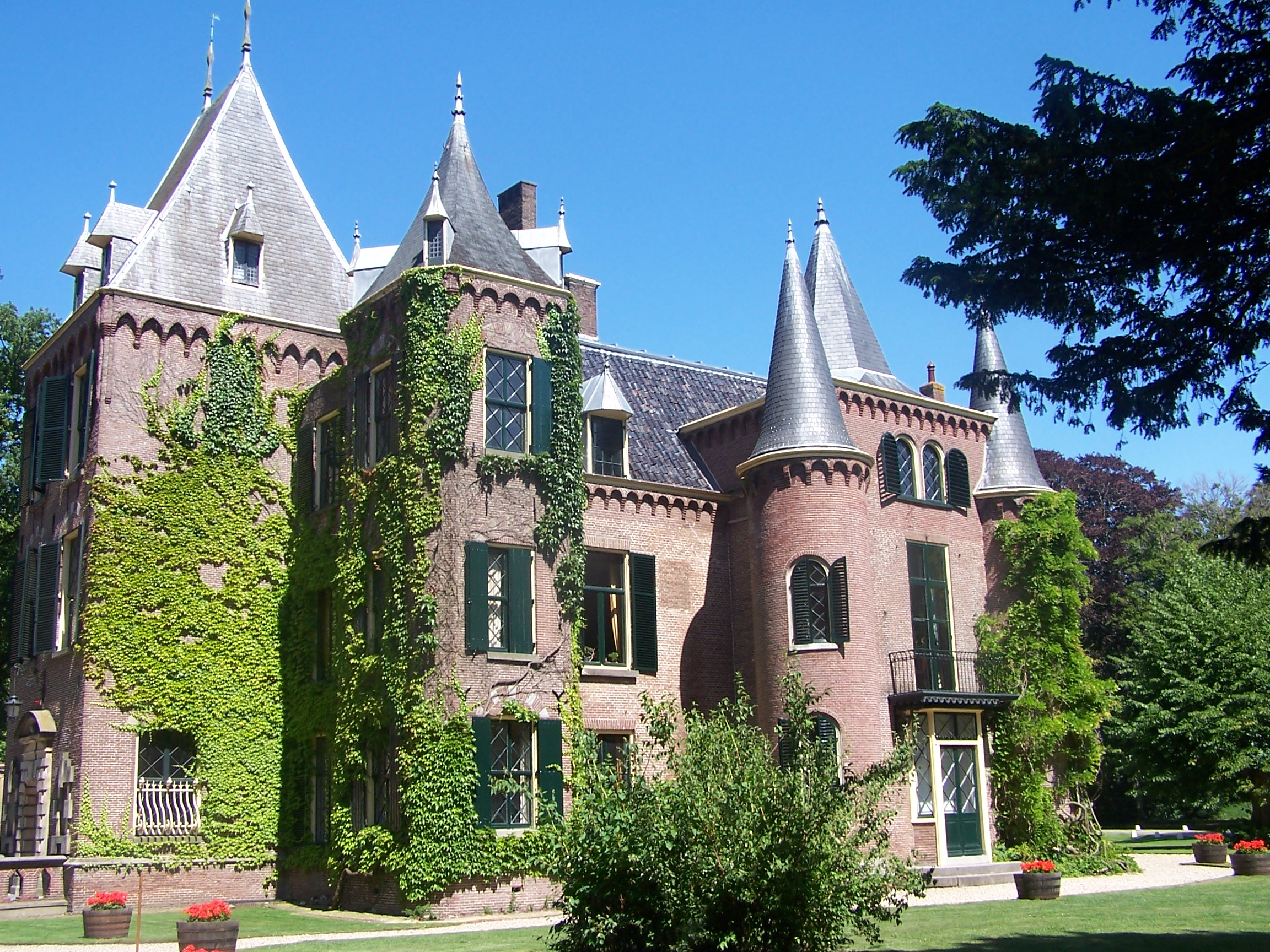
Castle Keukenhof, owned by the Pallandt family from 1857

The family is of German descent, originated in the Duchy of Jülich, then part of the Holy Roman Empire.

Members of the family held the hereditary titles of Baron and Count.

In the second half of the 16th and first half of the 17th century, they were also sovereign Counts of Culemborg and Wittem and as such played an important role in the Dutch revolt against royal authority.

In the second half of the 19th century one branch of the family through marriage inherited Keukenhof castle, gardens and an estate.

== Notable people ==
- Charlotte van Pallandt (1898–1997), Dutch painter and sculptor
- Frederik, Baron van Pallandt (1934–1994), Dutch singer
- Nina, Baroness van Pallandt (born 1932), Danish singer and actress
- Philip baron van Pallandt (1889–1979), Dutch noble and Scoutmaster
- Rudolph van Pallandt (1868–1913), Dutch sport shooter
