= Big Budget =

British comic and story paper

- The Big Budget Vol 1, #1

Publication information
- Publisher: C. Arthur Pearson Ltd
- Schedule: Weekly
- Genre: Humor/comedy
- Publication date: 19 June 1897 – 1909
- No. of issues: 614

Creative team
- Artist(s): Jack Butler Yeats, Ernest Wilkinson, C. H. Chapman, Ralph Hodgson, David Low

Big Budget was a British comic and story paper which ran weekly from 1897 until 1909.

== History ==
Published by C. Arthur Pearson, Big Budget was first published on 19 June 1897. Initially comprising three eight page sections; The Big Budget (a comic), The Comrade's Budget, and The Story Budget, the latter two being text fiction sections. By 1898 the page count was reduced to 20 with all the sections merged into one comic. In 1905 it incorporated a story paper entitled, The Boys' Leader with the comic strips started gradually disappearing until it became a fully fledged story paper. Its title changed to The Comet in 1909 and lasted for just 14 further issues.

Notable contributors include Jack Butler Yeats (Signor McCoy the Circus, John Duff-Pie, Little Boy Pink, and Kiroskewero the Detective), and Ernest Wilkinson (Doings of Von Puff, Von Eye, Iko Italiano and Von Sausage the Dog), C. H. Chapman, and Ralph Hodgson under the pseudonym "Yorick." It is also notable as the first publication to publish the work of cartoonist David Low, a three-strip cartoon in 1902, when he was aged only 11.

The Big Budget was also the home of Kenyon Ford, 'the Up-to-Date Detective' created by Maxwell Scott. There were about forty Kenyon Ford tales in all, running from 1897 to 1902. Scott's other landmark contribution to the series was Hard Pressed one of the first football stories to run in a story paper. Scott drew from his cricketer and footballer days to inform theserial which ran in Big Budget #121-163 in 1899.

== Sources ==
- Big Budget at the Grand Comics Database
- Comet at the Grand Comics Database
