= Home Chat =

British women weekly magazine

- Categories: Woman's magazine
- Frequency: Weekly
- Founder: Alfred C. Harmsworth
- Founded: 1895
- Final issue: 1959
- Company: Amalgamated Press
- Country: United Kingdom
- Language: English

Home Chat was a British weekly women's magazine, published by Amalgamated Press.

== History and profile ==
Alfred Harmsworth founded Home Chat to compete with Home Notes. He ran the Amalgamated Press and through them he published the magazine. He founded it in 1895 and the magazine ran until 1959. It was published as a small format magazine which came out weekly. As was usual for such women's weeklies the formulation was to cover society gossip and domestic tips along with short stories, dress patterns, recipes and competitions.

One of the editors was Maud Brown. She retired in 1919 and was replaced by her sister Flora.

== Reception and circulation ==
It began with a circulation of 186,000 in 1895 and finished up at 323,600 in 1959. It took a severe hit before the Second World War in circulation but had recovered before it was closed down.
