= John Thurman (Scouter) =

John Thurman OBE JP
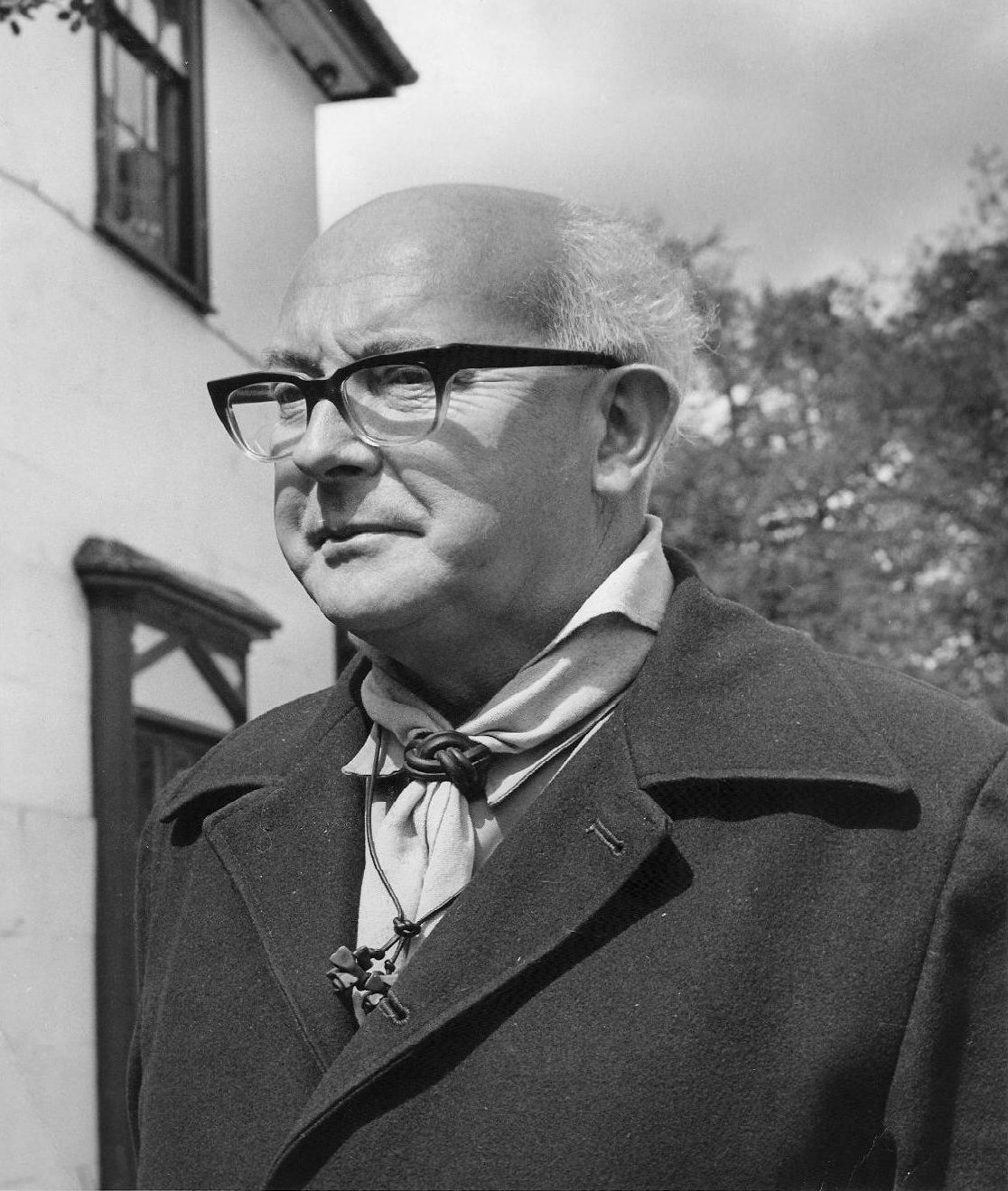
- John Thurman

Camp Chief of Gilwell Park and Director of International Adult Leader Training
- In office 1943–1969

Personal details
- Born: April 11, 1911
- Died: Epping Essex

Richard Francis "John" Thurman OBE JP (4 April 1911 – April 1985) was a British Scouting notable and Camp Chief of Gilwell Park from 1943 to 1969 and scouting's first International Director of Adult Leader Training

In 1943, he introduced the Gilwell woggle as the insignia for Basic Training. The woggle was first created in the early 1920s by Bill Shankley, a member of the Gilwell staff. He produced a two-strand Turk's head slide which was adopted as the official woggle. From 1943 to 1989, the Gilwell woggle was awarded on the completion of Basic Training, and the Gilwell scarf and the Wood Badge beads were awarded on the completion of Advanced Training.

In 1962 Thurman conducted the only Wood Badge course ever in Burma.

He was awarded the Bronze Wolf and the Silver Jay (Dutch scouts) in 1959 and the Silver Buffalo Award in 1962. In 1957 he also received the highest distinction of the Scout Association of Japan, the Golden Pheasant Award. He became an Officer of the Order of the British Empire on 1 January 1963 "for services to the Boy Scouts' Association".

== Works ==
John Thurman wrote a number of instructional Scouting books, notably on the subject of Scout pioneering. They were written in an amusing style, and are credited with increasing the popularity and scope of pioneering within the Scout Movement in the post World War II period. Many of his other books were co-authored with his friend Rex Hazlewood, who was editor of The Scout (magazine) and The Scouter magazines.

- 1949: The Campfire Leader's Book (with Rex Hazlewood)
- 1950: Pioneering Projects
- 1950: The Patrol Leaders' Handbook
- 1951: The Scout's Book of Gilwell
- 1952: Scout Camps: A Book for Scouters (with Rex Hazlewood)
- 1956: Fun with Ropes and Spars
- 1957: The Gilwell Camp Fire Book: Songs and yells from fifty years of Scouting (with Rex Hazlewood)
- 1959: Some Training Ideas for Scouts (with Rex Hazlewood)
- 1960: Camping (with Rex Hazlewood)
- 1962: The Second Gilwell Camp Fire Book: A further collection of songs and yells from fifty years of Scouting (with Rex Hazlewood)
- 1962: Pioneering Principles
- 1963: The Scout and his Axe
- 1964: Progressive Pioneering
- 1964: Summer Camp All Year Round (with Rex Hazlewood)
- 1969: The Gilwell Story (with Rex Hazlewood)
