= Wood Badge =

Training program for adult leaders in Scouting

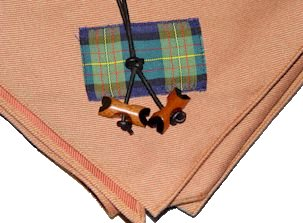
- Wood Badge beads on a Gilwell scarf or neckerchief.
- Founded: 1919
- Founder: The Boy Scouts Association (United Kingdom)

Wood Badge is a Scout leader training program, first implemented by The Boy Scouts Association in the United Kingdom in 1919 and subsequently adopted, with variations, by some other Scout organizations. Wood Badge courses teach Scout leadership skills and instil an ideological bond and commitment to the organizations. Courses generally have theory and practical phases followed by a practice project. Scouters who complete the course are awarded a pair of wood beads on each end of a leather thong, from a necklace of beads Robert Baden-Powell claimed to have taken from the African chief Dinizulu.

== Insignia ==
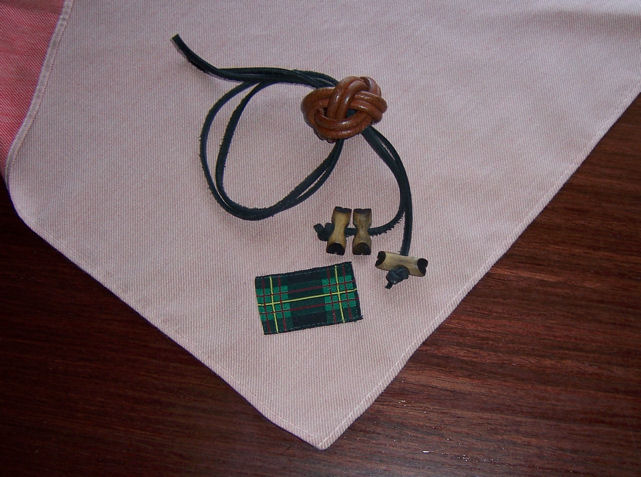
Wood Badge with three beads (training staff) and Gilwell scarf and woggle

The Wood Badge is worn around the neck as part of the Scouter's uniform. In some Scout organizations, the wood badge is presented together with a Gilwell scarf and a Gilwell woggle, denoting membership of the notional 1st Gilwell Scout Group.

=== Beads ===
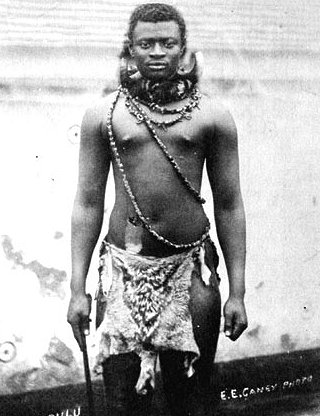
King Dinuzulu, wearing what is possibly the necklace from which the original Wood Badge beads came

Early Wood Badge beads came from a necklace that Baden-Powell claimed to have taken from a deserted Zulu mountain stronghold while on a failed military campaign to capture Dinizulu in Zululand (now part of South Africa). Such necklaces of beads made from acacia, known as iziQu in Zulu, were presented to brave warrior leaders. In 1919, Baden-Powell threaded beads from the necklace he had taken onto leather thong he claimed had been given to him by an elderly South African in Mafeking and called it the Wood Badge.

When produced, the thong is joined by a simple overhand knot but the two ends of the thong are often tied together with a decorative diamond knot. Various rituals are practiced in tying the diamond knot, such as having a fellow course member tie it, having a mentor or course leader tie it or having the recipient tie it after completing an additional activity that shows they have mastered training skills.

==== Additional beads ====
Additional beads are awarded for completion of training for different levels.

Meaning of different numbers of Wood Badge beads
Number of beads	Explanation
2 beads	Wood Badge (WB)
3 beads	For trainers at managing, planning, and implementing level. Deputy Gilwell Course Leader.
4 beads	For trainers at conceptualising, designing, and developing level. Gilwell Course Leader.
5 beads	In some Scouting associations during some time periods, a senior training official wore five beads, for example, William Hillcourt. Holders were sometimes referred-to as a Deputy Camp Chief of Gilwell Park.
6 beads	Baden-Powell wore six beads, as did his Deputy Chief Scout and right-hand man, Percy Everett. Baden-Powell's beads are on display at Baden-Powell House in London. Everett endowed his six beads to be worn by the Camp Chief of Gilwell Park as a badge of office.

=== Gilwell scarf or neckerchief ===
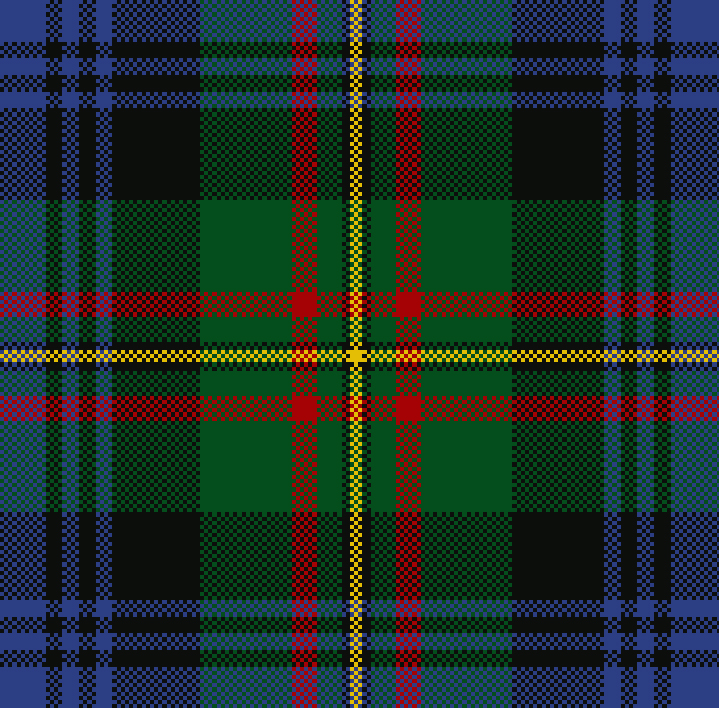
MacLaren Tartan

The Gilwell scarf is a triangular scarf or neckerchief made of cotton or wool twill with a taupe face and red back, with a patch of Clan MacLaren tartan affixed near the point. The patch of Maclaren clan tartan honours William de Bois Maclaren, The Boy Scouts Association commissioner who donated £7000 to The Boy Scouts Association in 1919 to purchase Gilwell Park as a leader training centre and an additional £3000 for improvements to the house on the estate. The Maclaren tartan represents the Wood Badge and training ties to Gilwell Park. Originally, the scarf was made entirely of triangular pieces of the tartan but its expense forced the adoption of the current design.

=== Gilwell woggle ===
A Finnish Gilwell Woggle

The Gilwell woggle is a braided leather two strand Turk's head knot, which has no beginning and no end and symbolizes the commitment to the Scout Movement. In some countries, Wood Badge training is divided into parts and the Gilwell woggle is given for completion of part one. First designed in the early 1920s by British Scouter Bill Shankley, making a Turk's head knot woggle was part of the leader training scheme by 1926.

== Scout leader training course ==
=== History ===
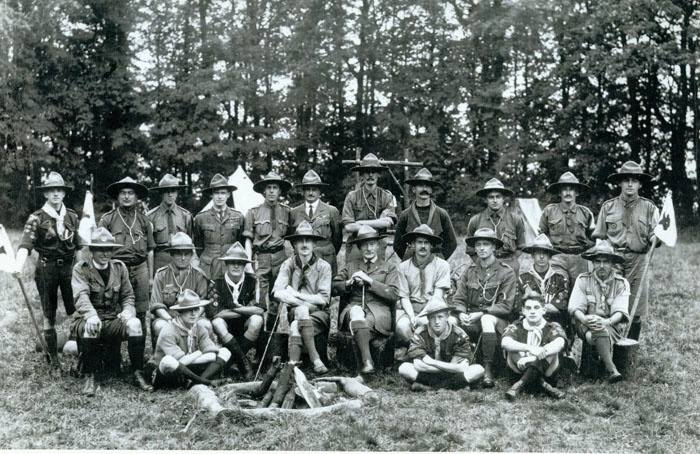
First Wood Badge training at Gilwell Park

The Boy Scouts Association conducted early Scoutmaster training camps in London and Yorkshire. The first Wood Badge training, with 18 participants, was organized by The Boy Scouts Association and held from 8 to 19 September 1919 at its newly acquired leader training centre, Gilwell Park, then just outside London. The training was led by The Boy Scouts Association's Gilwell Park Camp Chief, Francis Gidney and its Commissioner for Training Percy Everett, with lectures by Baden-Powell and others. Wood Badge training courses continued at Gilwell Park. Other sites providing Wood Badge training have taken the Gilwell name.

=== Modern curriculum ===
The principles underpinning the Wood Badge Training Scheme are:

- "Continuous Development": Emphasizes continuous adult development from both internal and external sources.
- "Essential Areas" Directed to include "Fundamentals of Scouting, Leadership and Team Management, Project management, Communication and Adult development."
- "Progressive With Multi-Entry Points" Adaptive to varying skill and knowledge levels.
- "Not Time-Bound"
- "Adaptable" Specifies that it be flexible, adaptable and responsive to the evolving needs of young people, adults and the scout organizations.
- "Recognizing and Using the Scout Method"
- Acceptance of the Principles and Practices of the "Safe from Harm" framework
- "Recognition of Individual Development" Direct that in each country establish a framework of skills to be attained and the participants be recognized when they are attained.

Included in the areas above, a Wood Badge competence framework is directed to cover development of the competencies in the following topic clusters:

- Scouting (fundamentals) essentials such as Essential Characteristics of Scouting, Youth Program Implementation, Vision and Growth, Safe from Harm, etc.
- Leadership and Management such as situational leadership, team management and development, taking initiative, leading change, learning organization, etc.
- Project management such as generating ideas, working on plans and solutions, achieving results, evaluating success etc.
- Communicating meaningfully, effectively and with cultural sensitivity.
- Adult development such as facilitating learning, organizing training, providing coaching and mentoring support etc.

Every suggested topic is directed to have a list of competencies developed through various training programs.

Generally, a Wood Badge course consists of classroom work, a series of self-study modules, outdoor training and the Wood Badge "ticket" or "project". Classroom and outdoor training are often combined and taught together and occur over one or more weeks or weekends. As part of completing this portion of the course, participants must write their tickets.

The exact curriculum varies from country to country but the training generally includes both theoretical and experiential learning. All course participants are introduced to the 1st Gilwell Scout group or Gilwell Scout Troop 1 (the latter name is used in the Boy Scouts of America and some other countries). In the Boy Scouts of America, they are also assigned to one of the traditional Wood Badge "critter" patrols. Instructors deliver training designed to strengthen the patrols. One-on-one work with an assigned troop guide helps each participant to reflect on what they have learned, so that he can better prepare an individualized "ticket". This part of the training program gives the adult Scouter the opportunity to assume the role of a Scout joining the original "model" troop, to learn firsthand how a troop ideally operates. The locale of all initial training is referred to as Gilwell Field, no matter its geographical location.

=== Ticket ===
The phrase 'working your ticket' comes from a story attributed in Scouting legend to Baden-Powell: Upon completion of a British soldier's service in India, he had to pay the cost of his ticket home. The most affordable way for a soldier to return was to engineer a progression of assignments that were successively closer to home.

Part of the transformative power of the Wood Badge experience is the effective use of metaphor and tradition to reach both heart and mind. In most Scout associations, "working your ticket" is the culmination of Wood Badge training. Participants apply themselves and their new knowledge and skills to the completion of items designed to strengthen the individual's leadership and the home unit's organizational resilience in a project or "ticket". The ticket consists of specific goals that must be accomplished within a specified time, often 18 months due to the large amount of work involved. Effective tickets require much planning and are approved by the Wood Badge course staff before the course phase ends. Upon completion of the ticket, a participant is said to have earned his way back to Gilwell.

=== On completion ===
After completion of the Wood Badge course, participants are awarded the insignia in a Wood Badge bead ceremony. They receive automatic membership in the notional 1st Gilwell Park Scout Group or Gilwell Troop 1. Within scouting, these leaders are henceforth called Gilwellians or Wood Badgers. It is estimated that worldwide over 100,000 Scouters have completed their Wood Badge training.

=== 1st Gilwell Scout Group ===
The 1st Gilwell Scout Group is a notional Scout Group composed of Wood Badge recipients. A meeting of the Group is held annually, during the first weekend in September at Gilwell Park for the Gilwell Reunion. Gilwell Reunions are also held in other places, often on that same weekend.

=== Training camp symbols ===
==== Axe and Log ====
The totem of Gilwell Park, the axe and log, has come to represent Wood Badge

The axe and log logo was conceived by the first Camp Chief, Francis Gidney, in the early 1920s to distinguish Gilwell Park from the Scout Headquarters. Gidney wanted to associate Gilwell Park with the outdoors and Scoutcraft rather than the business or administrative Headquarters offices. Scouters present at the original Wood Badge courses regularly saw axe blades masked for safety by being buried in a log. Seeing this, Gidney chose the axe and log as the totem of Gilwell Park.

==== Other symbols ====
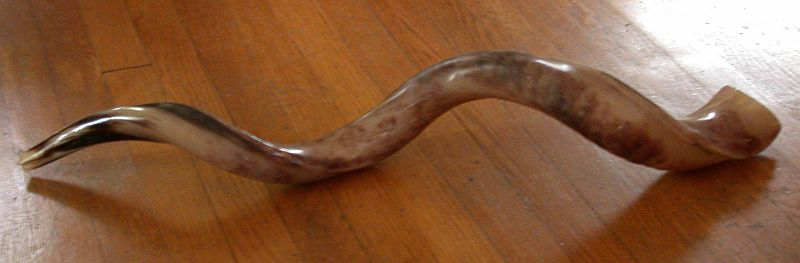
A kudu horn

The kudu horn is another Wood Badge symbol. Baden-Powell first encountered the kudu horn at the Battle of Shangani, where he discovered how the Matabele warriors used it to quickly spread a signal of alarm. He used the horn at the first Scout encampment at Brownsea Island in 1907. It is used from the early Wood Badge courses to signal the beginning of the course or an activity and to inspire Scouters to always do better.

The grass fields at the back of the White House at Gilwell Park are known as the Training Ground and The Orchard and are where Wood Badge training was held from the early years onward. A large oak, known as the Gilwell Oak, separates the two fields. The Gilwell Oak symbol is associated with Wood Badge, although the beads for the Wood Badge have never been made of this oak.

Wolf Cub leaders briefly followed a separate training system beginning in 1922, in which they were awarded the Akela Badge on completion. The badge was a single fang on a leather thong. Wolf Cub Leader Trainers wore two fangs. The Akela Badge was discontinued in 1925 and all leaders were awarded the Wood Badge on completion of their training. Very few of the fangs issued as Akela Badges can now be found.

== International training centers and trainers ==
=== Australia ===
The first Australian Wood Badge courses were held in 1920 at Gilwell Park, Gembrook after the return of two deputy camp chiefs, Charles Hoadley and Mr. Russell from training at Gilwell Park in England. In 2003, Scouts Australia established its Scouts Australia Institute of Training, a government-registered National Vocational & Education Training (VET) provider and awards a "Diploma of Leadership and Management" to adult leaders who complete the Wood Badge training and additional competencies. The VET qualifications are recognized throughout Australia by government and private industry.

=== Austria ===
The first Wood Badge Training in Austria took place in 1932. Scoutmaster Joesef Miegl took his Wood Badge training in Gilwell Park and September 8 to 17, 1922, he led a Leader Training near Vienna, one of the first in Austria. Scouters from Austria, Germany, Italy and Hungary took part. He brought in many things he learned in Gilwell Park about International and British Scouting but it was not an official Wood Badge training.

=== Belgium ===
The first Wood Badge training in Belgium was held in August 1923 at Jannée, led by Étienne Van Hoof. In the largest Scout association of the country, known as Les Scouts – Fédération des Scouts Baden-Powell de Belgique, it is necessary to complete the 3-steps formation in 3 years. After the 3 steps, the scout leader become a Wood Badger and he receives a Certificate as an animator in a holiday centre (Brevet d’animateur en centre de vacances (BACV)) by the French Community of Belgium.

=== Canada ===
Scouts Canada requires that Scouters (volunteers) are required to complete an online Wood Badge Part I Course, and are encouraged to complete a Wood Badge Part II program that includes self-directed learning, conducted through mentorship and coaching in addition to traditional courses and workshops. Upon completion of the Wood Badge Part II program a volunteer is awarded their "beads" and the Gilwell Neckerchief.

=== Finland ===
Alfons Åkerman gave the first eight Wood Badge courses and was from 1927 to 1935 the first Deputy Camp Chief. In lieu of Gilwell training, the Finnish Scouts have a "Kolmiapila-Gilwell" (Trefoil-Gilwell), combining aspects of both girls' and boys' advanced leadership training.

=== France ===
The first Wood Badge training in France was held Easter 1923 by Père Sevin in Chamarande.

=== Ireland ===
Wood Badge training in Ireland goes back to the 1st Larch Hill of the Catholic Boy Scouts of Ireland, who conducted Wood Badge courses that emphasized the Catholic approach to Scouting. This emphasis is now disappeared since the formation of Scouting Ireland.

=== Hungary ===
In 2010, 21 year after the reorganization of Hungarian Scout Association, was the first Scoutmaster training with the Wood Badge. (There was other Scoutmaster training before but these weren't organized according to the Wood Badge Framework.) The head of the first Wood Badge training in Hungary was Balázs Solymosi who has four beads. From 2010 to 2018, in 8 courses more than 50 adult leader performed successfully and awarded. In 2019 started a new era in Wood Badge training in Hungary. Two type of courses are available: one for leaders in the Association and one for local group leaders. The association level have the basis made by Balázs Solymosi, the group leader level based on a new training program. Both program gives the highest level of scouting knowledge from different point of view for the participants.

=== Madagascar ===
The First Wood Badge training of the Tily eto Madagasikara, known as the first Lasy Ravinala, was held in 1957 at Dinta Ambohidratrimo, Antananarivo, led by the first malagasy Chief Commissioner Samuel Randria.

In Madagascar, the participants of the Wood badge camp can only wear the woggle. They will get their first two bead one year later after writing and defend a dissertation. The Gilwell scarf can only be worn by a three-bead (Trainer) and a four-bead (Trainer of trainer) holder.

=== The Netherlands ===
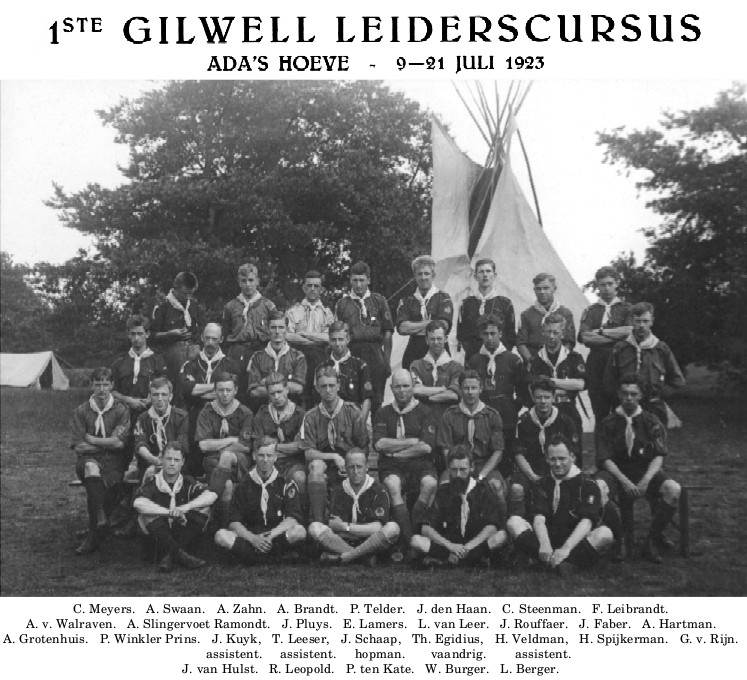
Gilwell Leiderscursus, The Netherlands July 9–21, 1923

The first Wood Badge training in the Netherlands was held in July 1923 by Scoutmaster Jan Schaap, on Gilwell Ada's Hoeve, Ommen. At Gilwell Sint Walrick, Overasselt, the Catholic Scouts had their training. Since approximately 2000, the Dutch Wood Badge training takes place on the Scout campsite Buitenzorg, Baarn, or outdoors in Belgium or Germany under the name 'Gilwell Training'.

=== Norway ===
In Norway, Woodbadge is known as Trefoil-Gilwell Training.

=== Philippines ===
Wood Badge was introduced in the Philippines in 1953 with the first course held at Camp Gre-Zar in Novaliches, Quezon City. Today, Wood Badge courses are held at the Philippine Scouting Center for the Asia-Pacific Region, at the foothills of Mount Makiling, Los Baños, Laguna province.

=== Sweden ===
As in several other Nordic countries, the Swedish Wood Badge training is known as Trefoil Gilwell, being a unification of the former higher leadership programmes of the Swedish Guides and Scouts, known respectively as the Trefoil training and the Gilwell training.

=== United Kingdom ===
The first Wood Badge training took place at Gilwell Park. The estate continues to provide the service for British Scouters of The Scout Association and international participants. Original trainers include Baden-Powell and Gilwell Camp Chiefs Francis Gidney, John Wilson and John Thurman.

=== United States ===
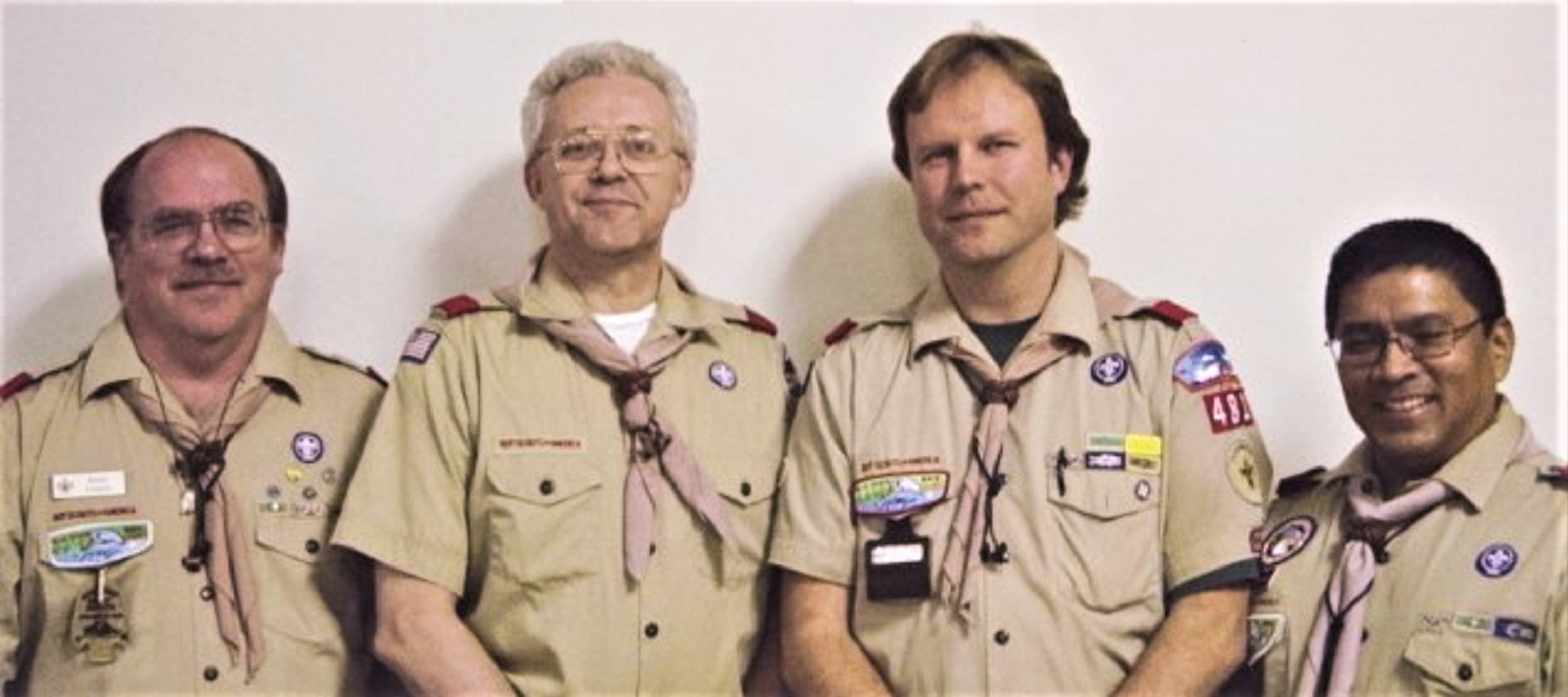
Four American Wood Badgers with insignia

Wood Badge was introduced to the United States by Baden-Powell. The first course was held in 1936 at the Mortimer L. Schiff Scout Reservation, the Boy Scouts of America national training center until 1979. Despite this early first course, Wood Badge was not formally adopted in the United States until 1948 under the guidance of Bill Hillcourt who became the first national Deputy Camp Chief of Gilwell in the BSA, also called the Deputy Camp Chief for the United States. Wood Badge courses are held throughout the country at local council camps, others are held at the National High Adventure Bases.
