= Ethel Pearson =

British humanitarian (1870–1959)

Lady Pearson DBE
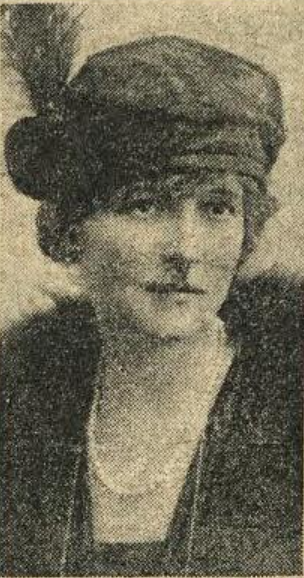
- Pearson in 1921
- Born: Ethel Maud Fraser; 3 November 1870; Hampstead, London, England
- Died: 10 April 1959 (aged 88); 17 Eresby House, Rutland Gate, Knightsbridge, London, England
- Occupation: Humanitarian

Ethel Maud, Lady Pearson, DBE (nee Fraser; 3 November 1870 – 10 April 1959) was a British humanitarian who was active in charities to aid the blind.

She was born in Hampstead, London, the daughter of William John Fraser of Herne Bay, Kent, an engineer, and his wife Jane. On 3 June 1897, she married, as his second wife, the publisher Arthur Pearson, who was created a baronet in 1916.

She became heavily involved in St Dunstan's Hostel for the Blind, the home for blinded soldiers that her husband, who became blind himself, founded in 1915. For these services, she was appointed Dame Commander of the Order of the British Empire (DBE) in the 1920 Birthday Honours.

She was also a vice-president of the Royal National Institute for the Blind (RNIB). She founded the Blind Musicians Concert Party, which enabled musicians who had been blinded in the war to earn a living for themselves, as well as bring in funds for St Dunstan's and the RNIB. By 1920, it had raised an estimated (equivalent to £3,864,000 in 2025). Following her husband's death in 1921 she succeeded him as president of St Dunstan's and held the position until 1947, when she was succeeded by their only son, Sir Neville Pearson.

Lady Pearson died on 10 April 1959, aged 88, at her home at 17 Eresby House, Rutland Gate, Knightsbridge, London.
