= Faiz El-Ghusein =

Syrian lawyer and writer

Historical photo of statesman and lawyer Faiz El-Ghusein

Faiz El-Ghusein (Arabic: فايز الغصين) (1883–1968) was a sheikh from the Hauran, and a former official of the Turkish Government. He is most widely remembered as the author of Martyred Armenia, an eyewitness account of Armenian genocide.

== Early life ==
El-Ghusein was the son of one of the heads of the tribe of El-Sulût who lived in the Haurân territory. He attended the Mekteb-i Aşiret-i Humayun (Tribal School) at Constantinople, and continued on to the Royal College. After being attached to the staff of the Vali of Syria, he held the position of Kaimakâm of Mamouret-el-Azîz for three and a half years. He practised law at Damascus with partners Shukri Bey El-Asli and Abdul-Wahhâb Bey El-Inglîzi, and went to be a member of the General Assembly representing Haurân, and subsequently became a member of the Committee of the General Assembly.

== Exodus ==
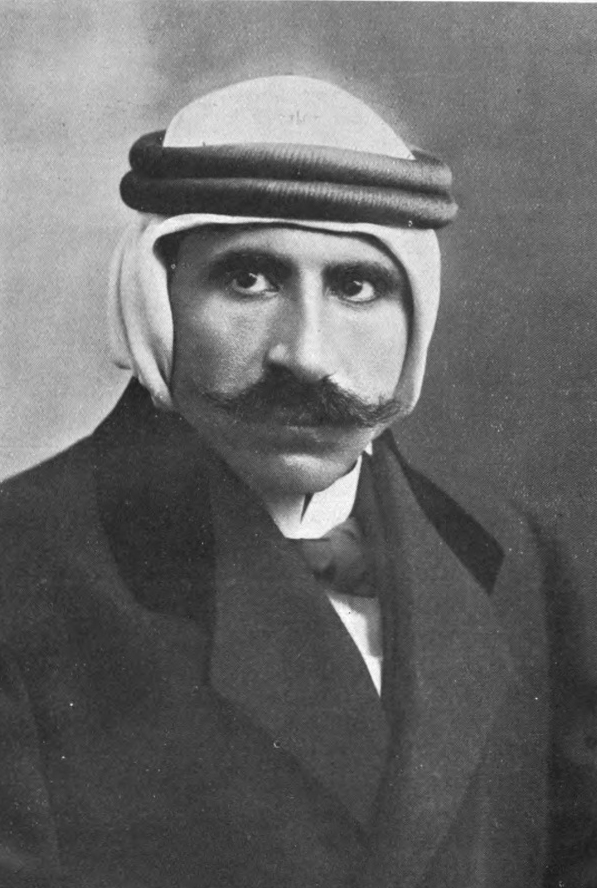

Due to being accused of being involved in a plan to obtain independence for the Arab people under the protection of Britain and France, and of inciting the tribes against the Turkish Government, El-Ghusein was arrested by the Government, thrown into prison, and later taken to Aalîya to be tried for political offences. He was acquitted, but the Government disregarded the decisions and escorted him to Erzurum, however he was detained at Diarbekir by its Vali due to the Russian presence preventing them from reaching Erzurum.

Initially he was imprisoned at Diarbekir for twenty-two days, after which he remained at Diarbekir for six and a half months, witnessing and hearing of the atrocities committed by the Turks against the Armenian people. El-Ghusein then fled as described in Seven Pillars of Wisdom, written by the British soldier T. E. Lawrence:

Another friend at court was Faiz el Ghusein, a secretary. He was a Sulut Sheikh from the Hauran, and a former official of the Turkish Government, who had escaped across Armenia during the war, and had eventually reached Miss Gertrude Bell in Basra. She had sent him on to me with a warm recommendation.

== Martyred Armenia ==
Audio recording of Section 3 of Martyred Armenia, by Faiz El-Ghusein. The section describes methods of massacre adopted by the Turkish Gendarmes and authorities.

Faiz El-Ghusein was exiled to Diyarbekir under the suspicion of supporting the Arab Revolt. While in Diyarbekir, El-Ghusein witnessed the massacres of Armenians in and around the area. El-Ghusein wrote much of what he witnessed in his book Martyred Armenia which provides an eyewitness account of the massacres and exposes its systematic nature. The account was originally published in Arabic in 1916 under the title "Massacres in Armenia" but was changed to Martyred Armenia under its English translation. In the foreword of the book, El-Ghusein states, "The war must needs come to an end after a while, and it will then be plain to readers of this book that all I have written is the truth, and that it contains only a small part of the atrocities committed by the Turks against the hapless Armenian people."

He wrote of the massacres and their opposition to Islamic principles as follows:

Annihilation seemed to be the sole means of deliverance; they found their opportunity in a time of war, and they proceeded to this atrocious deed, which they carried out with every circumstance of brutality — a deed which is contrary to the law of Islam."

The mistreatment of the Armenians in the name of Islam distressed him greatly, and he expressed concern about how his faith was being used to justify the brutality:

Is it right that these imposters, who pretend to be the supports of Islam and the Khilâfat, the protectors of the Moslems, should transgress the command of God, transgress the Koran, the Traditions of the Prophet, and humanity? Truly, they have committed an act at which Islam is revolted, as well as all Moslems and all the peoples of the earth, be they Moslems, Christians, Jews, or idolators. As God lives, it is a shameful deed, the like of which has not been done by any people counting themselves as civilised.

As to their preparations, the flags, bombs and the like, even assuming there to be some truth in the statement, it does not justify the annihilation of the whole people, men and women, old men and children, in a way which revolts all humanity and more especially Islam and the whole body of Moslems, as those unacquainted with the true facts might impute these deeds to Mohammedan fanaticism."

He is buried in El Sharaeh, a village in Ottoman Syria.

== See also ==
- Witnesses and testimonies of the Armenian genocide
