= Sir Arthur Pearson, 1st Baronet =

British journalist and publisher (1866–1921)

Sir Arthur Pearson Bt GBE
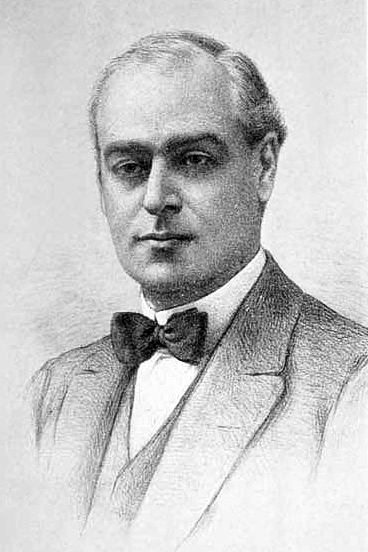
- Sketch published 1919
- Born: Cyril Arthur Pearson; 24 February 1866; Wookey, Somerset, England
- Died: 9 December 1921 (aged 55); London, England
- Burial place: Hampstead Cemetery
- Education: Winchester College
- Occupations: Publishing magnate, Philanthropist
- Known for: Daily Express
- Spouses: Isobel Sarah Bennett (m. 1887) Ethel Pearson (m. 1897)
- Children: 7, including Neville
- Parent(s): Arthur Cyril Pearson and Phillippa Massingberd Maxwell Lyte

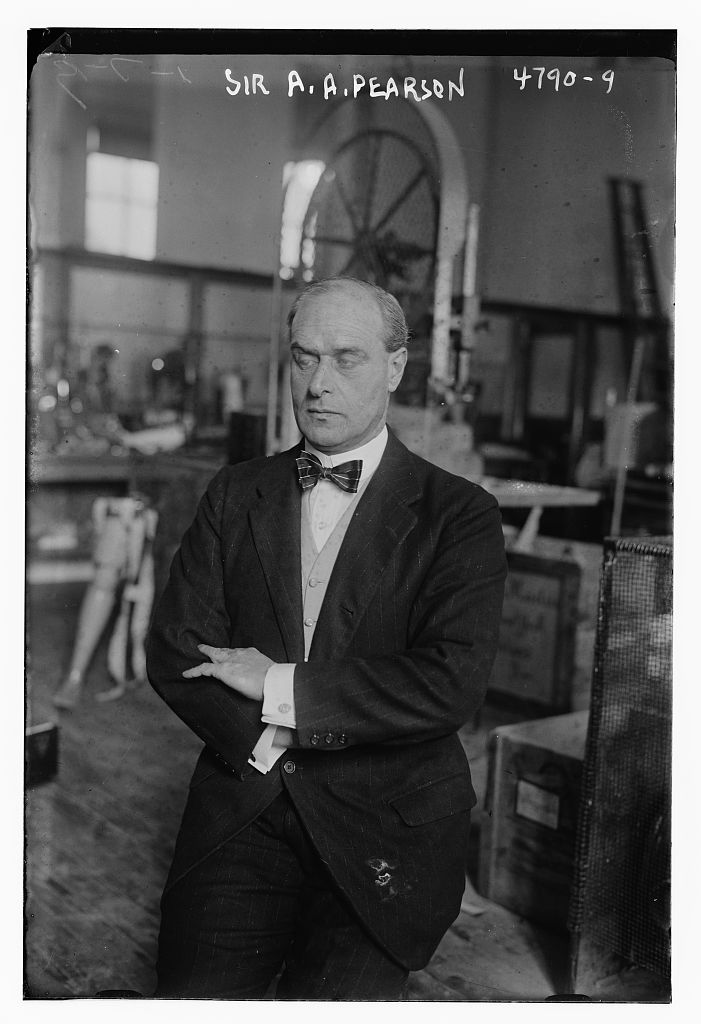
Sir Arthur Pearson, 1st Baronet, in 1918

Sir Cyril Arthur Pearson, 1st Baronet (24 February 1866 – 9 December 1921) was a British newspaper magnate and publisher, who founded the Daily Express.

== Family and early life ==
Pearson was born on 24 February 1866 in the village of Wookey, Somerset, a son of Arthur Cyril Pearson and Phillippa Massingberd Maxwell Lyte, who was a granddaughter of the hymn-writer and poet Henry Francis Lyte. He was educated at Winchester College in Hampshire. His father became rector of Drayton Parslow in Buckinghamshire. His first job was as a journalist working for the London-based publisher George Newnes on Tit-Bits magazine. Within his first year he had impressed Newnes enough to be made his principal assistant.

In December 1887, Pearson married Isobel Sarah Bennett, the daughter of Canon Frederick Bennett, of Maddington, Wiltshire, with whom he had three daughters. In 1897, Pearson married, as his second wife, Ethel, daughter of William John Fraser. Ethel, Lady Pearson, would be appointed Dame Commander of the Order of the British Empire (DBE). The couple had a son, Neville (birth registered in Farnham, Q1 1898), and three daughters.

== Career ==
In 1890, after six years of working for Newnes, Pearson left to form his own publishing business and within three weeks had created the periodical journal Pearson's Weekly, the first issue of which sold a quarter of a million copies. A philanthropist, in 1892 he established the charitable Fresh Air Fund, now part of the Sheldon Trust, to enable disadvantaged children to partake in outdoor activities. In 1898, he purchased the Morning Herald, and in 1900 merged it into his new creation, the halfpenny Daily Express.

The Express was a departure from the papers of its time and created an immediate impact by carrying news instead of only advertisements on its front page. He was successful in establishing papers in provincial locations such as the Birmingham Daily Gazette. He came into direct competition with the Daily Mail and in the resulting commercial fight almost took control of The Times, being nominated as its manager, but the deal fell through.

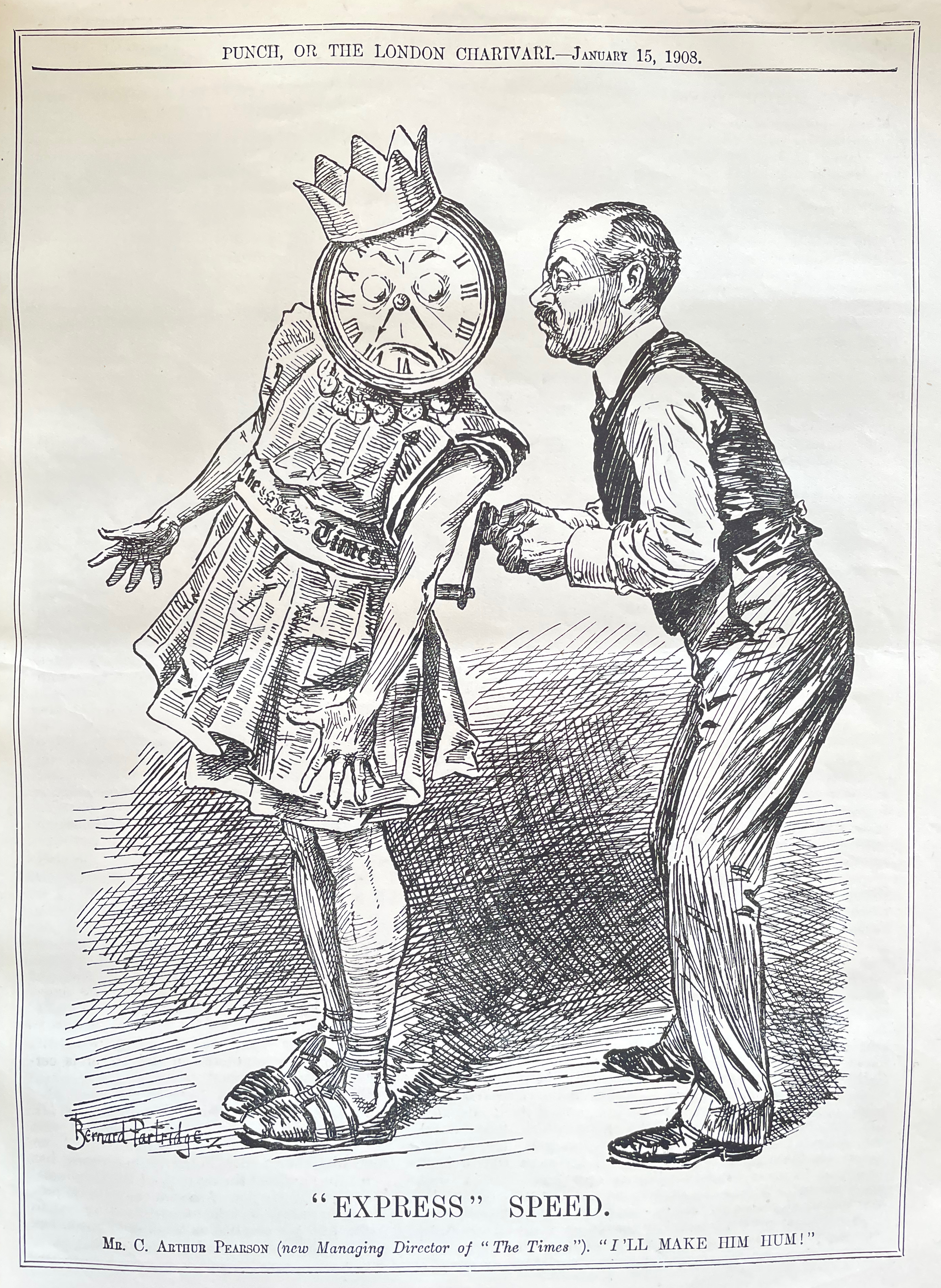
Punch cartoon, January 15, 1908, making fun of Daily Express founder Arthur Pearson's appointment as manager of The Times

In 1898, Pearson founded The Royal Magazine, a monthly literary magazine which remained in publication until 1939.

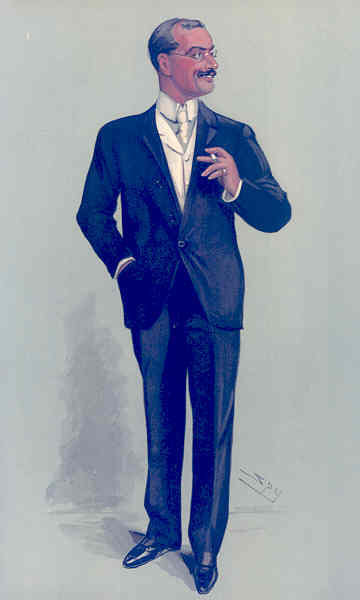
Pearson caricatured by Spy for Vanity Fair, 1904

In 1900 Pearson despatched the explorer and adventurer Hesketh Hesketh-Prichard to Patagonia to investigate dramatic reports of a giant hairy mammal inhabiting the forests, and conjectured to be a giant ground sloth, long since extinct. Hesketh-Prichard's reports from 5,000 miles away gripped readers of The Express, despite his finding no trace of the creature.

During this same period, Pearson was also active as a writer, and wrote a number of tourist guides to locations in Britain and Europe. Under the pseudonym of "Professor P. R. S. Foli", he wrote Handwriting as an Index to Character in 1902, as well as works on fortune-telling and dream interpretation. Pearson was a strong supporter of Joseph Chamberlain's tariff-reform movement, and organised the Tariff Reform League in 1903, becoming its first chairman. In 1904 he purchased the struggling The Standard and its sister paper the Evening Standard for £700,000 from the Johnstone family.

He merged the Evening Standard with his St James's Gazette and changed the Conservative stance of both papers into a pro-Liberal one, but was unsuccessful in arresting the slide in sales and in 1910 sold them to the MP Sir Davison Dalziel, and Sir Alexander Henderson.

== Loss of eyesight and later life ==
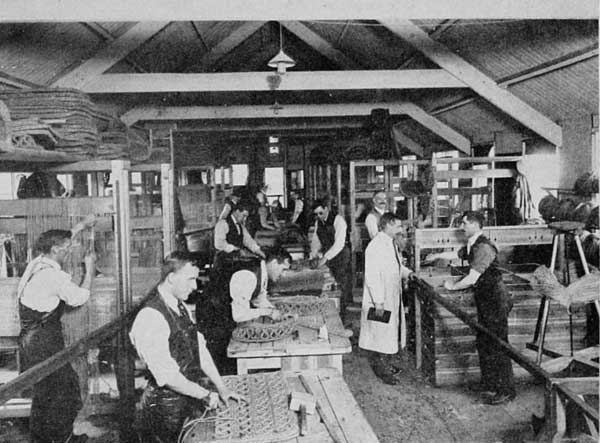
Blinded soldiers learning mat-weaving at St Dunstan's

Beginning to lose his sight due to glaucoma despite a 1908 operation, Pearson was progressively forced from 1910 onwards to relinquish his newspaper interests; the Daily Express eventually passed, in November 1916, under the control of the Canadian–British tycoon Sir Max Aitken, later Lord Beaverbrook.

Through the British and Foreign Blind Association, Pearson published his Pearson's Easy Dictionary in Braille form in 1912. Later completely blind, Pearson was made president of the National Institution for the Blind in 1914, raising its income from £8,000 to £360,000 in only eight years. On 29 January 1915, he cofounded The Blinded Soldiers and Sailors Care Committee (later renamed St Dunstan's and now known as Blind Veterans UK), for soldiers blinded by gas attack or trauma during the First World War. Its goal, radical for the times, was to provide vocational training rather than charity for invalided servicemen, and thus to enable them to carry out independent and productive lives. Not only were blinded soldiers trained in work such as basket weaving or massage, but also in social skills such as dancing, braille reading or sports to give them back self-confidence. Upon releasing them, they were gifted little tokens of independence such as braille watches.

Pearson's dedication to this work led to his receiving a baronetcy on 12 July 1916, whereupon he took the title Sir Arthur Pearson, 1st Baronet of St Dunstan's, London. He received the GBE in 1917.

Pearson was a close friend of the pioneer of the Scouting movement Baden-Powell, and supportive of his efforts in setting up the movement and publishing its magazine The Scout. When Pearson's scheme for publishing in Braille was faltering due to lack of funds, on 2 May 1914 Baden-Powell publicly requested that "all Scouts perform a 'good turn' for The Scout magazine publisher Mr C. Arthur Pearson, in order to raise money for his scheme of publishing literature in Braille for the blind."

In 1919, Pearson wrote the book Victory Over Blindness: How it Was Won by the Men of St Dunstan's. He founded the Greater London Fund for the Blind in 1921, funded by the establishment of its annual 'Geranium Day' appeal.

== Death ==
Pearson died on 9 December 1921 when he drowned in his bath after knocking himself unconscious in a fall. He was buried in Hampstead Cemetery after a service to which the Cabinet, the British and Norwegian royal families, and many institutes for the blind all sent official representatives. Two of his pallbearers were blind. He was survived by his wife, son and three daughters.

In 1922, a biography, The Life of Sir Arthur Pearson, was written by Sidney Dark and published by Hodder & Stoughton.

Pearson's publishing company, C. Arthur Pearson Ltd., had had a cooperative relationship with Pearson's old employer, George Newnes Ltd, and as Pearson gradually gave up his publishing duties due to his blindness, by 1914, Pearson had essentially become an imprint of Newnes. With Pearson's death, this arrangement was formalized, and in 1929, Newnes purchased all outstanding shares of Pearson's company.

Decades after the founder's death, into the 1960s, the C. Arthur Pearson Ltd. imprint was one of London's four leading magazine publishers — along with Newnes, Odhams Press, and the Hulton Press. (By 1963, all three had become part of the International Publishing Corporation.)

== Sources ==
- Pearson, Arthur (1919). Victory Over Blindness. George H. Doran.
- Sidney, Dark (1922). The Life of Sir Arthur Pearson. Hodder and Stoughton.
- Fraser, Ian (1961) My Story of St Dunstan's.
- Wainewright, John Bannerman (ed) (1907) Winchester College 1836–1906: A Register. P. and G. Wells.

Baronetage of the United Kingdom
New creation	Baronet (of St Dunstans); 1916 – 1921	Succeeded by Neville Pearson
