= Scout leader =

Trained adult leader of a Scout unit

Scouters
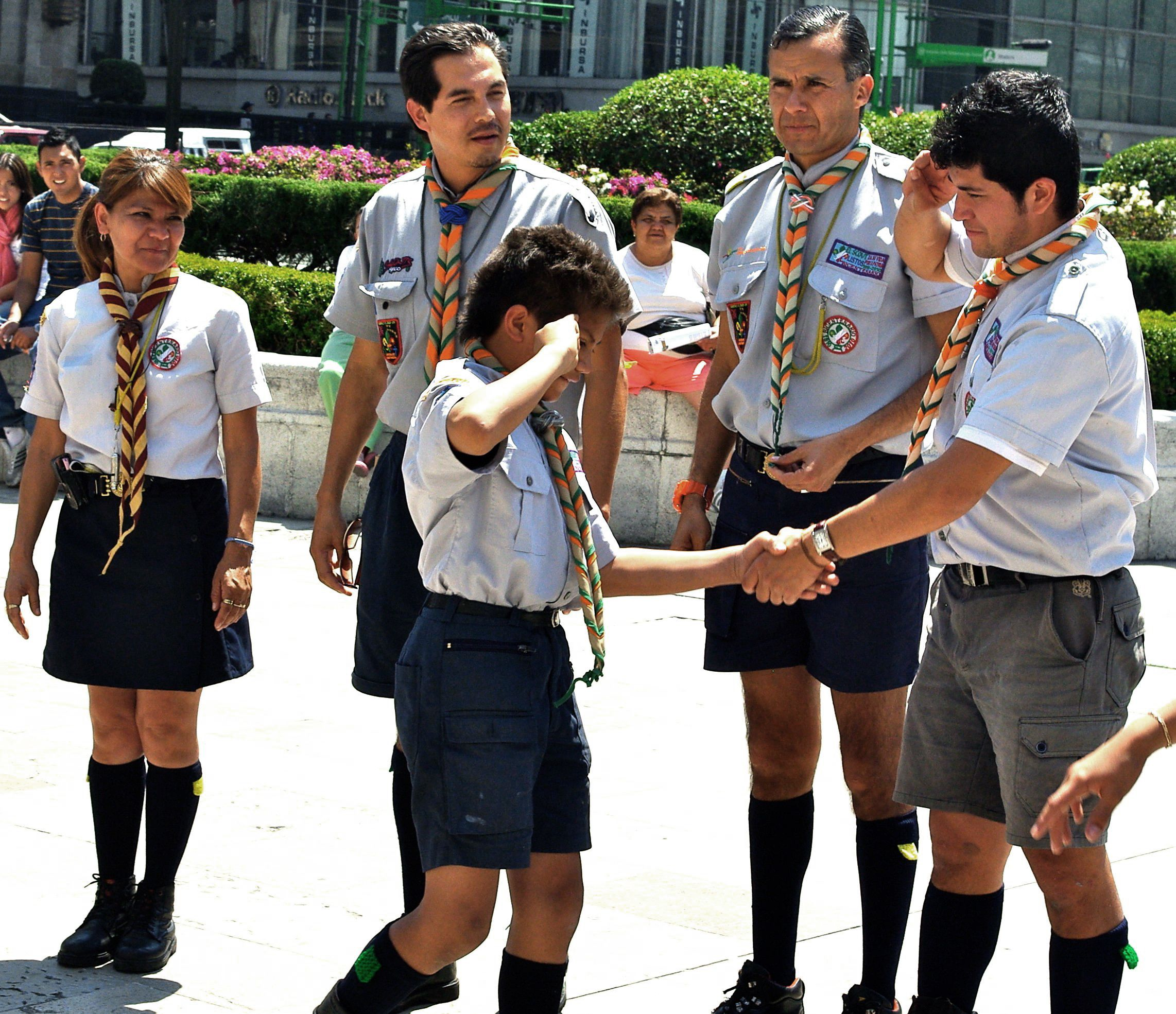
- Leaders welcome a boy into Scouting, March 2010, Mexico
- Founded: 1907

Scout leader, Scoutmaster, Scouter, Scout Advisor or Scout Counsellor generally refers to the trained adult leader of a Scout unit. The terms used vary from country to country, over time, and with the type of unit.

== Roles ==
There are many different roles a leader can fulfil depending on the type of unit. Positions are usually voluntary and are often divided between "uniform" and "lay" roles. For many, this volunteerism is an avocation.

Uniformed Scout Leaders are primarily responsible for organising the activities of the group, and training the youth members through the Scout programme. Other roles include liaison with parents, districts, or other parties such as the unit's sponsoring (chartered) organisation.

Lay supporters are not always called scout Leaders; although they may assist with activities and training, they do not always hold a formal position and may not have received training. Beyond the Scout programme, lay supporters may take responsibility for administrative tasks such as budgets, managing properties, recruitment, equipment, transport, and many other roles.

The roles of leaders in senior units like Venture Scout, Explorer Scout and Rover Scout sections tend to be consultative, with much of the administration and activity planning in the hand of older Scouts, while in junior units like Cub Scout and Scout sections, the adult leaders need to take a more central role.

Beyond the group are further uniformed positions (sometimes called Commissioners) at levels such as district, county, council or province, depending on the structure of the national organisation. They also work along with lay teams and professionals. Training teams and other related functions are often formed at these levels. Some countries appoint a Chief Scout or Chief Commissioner as the most senior uniformed member.

== Training, screening and appointment of leaders ==
Scout Leaders participate in a series of training courses, typically aiming for the Wood Badge as the main qualification of an adult leader in Scouting. In most countries, Wood Badge holders can wear a Gilwell scarf, Turk's head knot woggle, and Wood Badge beads.

Scout Leaders are given a formal appointment (called a warrant in many countries). Before appointing an adult leader, most associations perform background checks on candidates to ensure their suitability for working with children.

== Terminology ==
Robert Baden-Powell initially used the terms Scoutmaster and Cubmaster for adult leaders (coming from the English usage of the word "master" as a synonym for "teacher"), and these terms are still used in some countries and units, including the United States. As the word master picked up old-fashioned connotations, it was replaced by other terms such as Scout Leader or Scouter in many Commonwealth countries, following The Scout Association in the United Kingdom.

=== Australia ===
In Scouts Australia, all five sections have a Leader, although a Joey Leader has a much more driving role than a Venturer Leader, who should be standing back and assisting the elected Unit Chair. Rover Leaders stepped back during the 1970s, becoming Rover Advisors, the responsibility for the Crew passing to the elected Crew Leader.

There are several different types of Leader in Australia, all of them (and all members of the Rover Section) have the opportunity to complete the Wood Badge training scheme

Sectional Leaders

Run a Unit each week. They are the ones who attend weekly activities, sign off badge work and join Scouts for weekend activities.

Group Leaders

Run the Group as a whole, liaising between the Committee, who see to the needs of the Group, hall, power, gear, etc. and the Sectional Leaders.

Activity Leaders

Have qualifications in Adventurous activities, from Water Activities to Abseilling to Radio and Four Wheel Driving and First Aid, who put these skills at the disposal of a Region or Branch. These leaders often have another role in Scouting at the same time.

Leader Trainers

Provide the Training to other Leaders and usually have been in Scouting for several years. Training is not usually their only role in Scouting.

District Leaders

Provide help and assistance to local groups. Most Districts try to have at least one District Leader for each Section, as well as Public Relations, Adult Training & Development and Water Activities.

Commissioners

are responsible for the management of an aspect of Scouting and/or the leadership of other adults, as opposed to sectional leaders who run the youth program.

The Scout Fellowship

Is a group of former Leaders who no longer have the time or desire to be a part of Scouting every week. They have the opportunity to help out occasionally when leaders are needed temporarily because of hospital or travel, at large camps such as Jamborees and are still covered by Scout Insurance.

All Leader positions are appointments for three years, when the appointment is reviewed and the Leader is renewed, reassigned or resigns. When a new Probationary Leader begins, they are presented with a Certificate of Adult Membership and complete a three-hour seminar called Intro to Scouting (or Rovering) which outlines the basic structure and procedures. After this comes the Basic Sectional Techniques course, which gives the Leader the right to wear the two-strand Turks Head or "Gilwell" Woggle. After the 2007 review of the Venturer Section, Venturer Scouts will soon be allowed to complete Venturer Basic. Leaders are then presented with a Certificate of Adult Leadership, and this is where most people stop their training, but after at least six months, Leaders then are eligible to complete the Advanced Sectional Techniques Course, which allows them to conduct more advanced activities, network with other experienced Leaders and then after successful completion of the Course be presented with the Wood Badge.

Scouts Australia is an Enterprise Registered Training Organisation (RTO:5443) and Leaders can apply to be granted a Certificate III in Business after completing the Basic Course, and a Certificate IV in Leadership and Management after the Advanced Course. Later they can also complete a Diploma of Leadership and Management or Certificate Qualifications in Outdoor Recreation through the Scouts Australia Institute of Training.

=== Ireland ===
A uniformed adult member of Scouting Ireland who commits to the Scout Promise and Law is known as a "Scouter". Rover Scouts can also be adults, and an eligible member can be a Scouter or Rover or both. Adult members are subject to police vetting (in either jurisdiction). Scouters who provide Youth Programme are known as "Programme Scouters". Various Group, County, Provincial and National appointment holders in general need to be Scouters. Associate members are adult members who do not take the Scout Promise, and may include supporting Officers such as Group Secretary or County Treasurer.

=== Philippines ===
In the Boy Scouts of the Philippines, all uniformed adults, including office employees, are "Scouters." Not all Scouters are Unit Leaders, but all Unit Leaders are Scouters. The generic term for an adult in charge of a Scout unit is "Unit Leader." There are five types:

1. A "Langkay Leader" takes charge of KID Scouts.
2. A "Kawan Leader" takes charge of KAB Scouts.
3. A "Troop Leader" takes charge of Boy Scouts.
4. An "Outfit Advisor" takes charge of Senior Scouts.
5. A "Circle Manager" advises Rovers and Roverettes.

Langkay Leaders and Kawan Leaders are women. Troop Leaders, Outfit Advisors, and Circle Managers may be men or women, and are often informally called "Scoutmasters."

=== Poland ===
Scoutmaster of Polish People's Republic

Scoutmaster of Polish People's Republic was the highest honourable rank in ZHP during Polish People's Republic from 1965 until 1989. To gain the rank someone should have been serving as a Scoutmaster, have received positive assessment of the service and finally have submitted a record of his (or her) activity to the Chief Scout. Nomination to this rank was celebrated yearly on the occasion of National Holiday of Polish Restitution on 22 July. The insignia of this rank was a red & white felt tee under the Scouting Cross and a red & white chevron in the shape of a Fleur-de-lis worn on the left sleeve of their Scout uniform.

This rank was given to approximately 6000 people, which significantly diminished its initial purpose. Nominations to the rank were ended with collapse of Polish People's Republic and holders were proposed to return to Scoutmaster. Attempts to change the rank's name to Scoutmaster of Republic of Poland were abandoned because of protests of majority of traditional Scout groups of ZHP. Since 1990 the system of Instructor Ranks of ZHP no longer includes the rank of Scoutmaster of Polish People's Republic.

=== South Africa ===
Scouts South Africa (then called Boy Scouts of South Africa) decided in the early 90s to change the name of a Scoutmaster to Scouter. The reason for this change was due to negative connotations of the word master. The terms Troop Scouter and Pack Scouter are used for adult leaders of Scout Troops and Cub Packs. Rover Crews are mentored by a Rover Scouter.

=== United Kingdom ===
==== The Scout Association ====
The Scout Association used the term Scoutmaster originally, but the term Scout Section Team Leader is now used. Other adult leaders in the Scout Troop are called Scout Section Team Members. Terms used in other sections are Beaver Section Team Leader, Beaver Section team Member, Cub Section Team Leader, Cub Section Team Member, Explorer Section Team Leader, Explorer Section Team Member, and so on. The Scout Group is led by a Group Lead Volunteer. When Rover Scouts existed, there were Rover Scout Leaders and Assistant Rover Scout Leaders. Collectively all adult leaders are called Scouters. One of the leaders may take on the role of Quartermaster, although this role can also be taken on by a parent or other member of the Group Trustee Board.

Traditionally the primary adult Scout Leader is called Skip, short for Skipper, but recently more often by their first name. Similarly, the primary Cub Scout Leader is called Akela, after the leader of the Wolf pack in The Jungle Book, although this is more common.

Explorer Scouts can help out at younger sections as a Young Leader.

At District level a District Lead Volunteer may appoint a District Beaver Team Lead, District Cub Team Lead and a District Scout Team Lead and a District 14-24 Team Lead (Explorers and Network) as well as a District Youth Lead. At County Level a County Lead Volunteer may appoint similar roles to District Level.

Changes aimed at developing a "teams based volunteering" culture adopted from 2023 included introduction of the term lead volunteer to replace the term Commissioner.

==== Baden-Powell Scouts' Association ====
Adult leaders

The Baden-Powell Scouts' Association continue to use the traditional title of Scoutmaster. Other adult leaders in the Scout Troop are called Assistant Scout Masters. Other titles include Cub Scout Master, Assistant Cub Scout Master and so on. The Group is led by a Group Scout Master. In common with The Scout Association, adult leaders are sometimes referred to as Scouters.

Youth leaders

In the Scout and Senior Scout sections, youth leaders include Senior Troop Leader, Senior Patrol Leader, Assistant Senior Patrol Leader, Patrol Leaders, Assistant Patrol Leaders, Quartermaster, and Instructor.

=== United States ===
==== Scouting America ====
In Scouting America, in all Scouting units above the Cub Scout pack, units serving adolescent Scouts, leadership of the unit comprises both adult leaders (Scouters) and youth leaders (Scouts). In fact, this is a critical component of the program. In order to learn leadership, the youth must actually serve in leadership roles. Adult leaders may be either men or women in all positions.

A Scouts BSA troop is run by the Senior Patrol Leader (SPL), who is elected by the troop, and their assistant, who is appointed by the SPL. These and the other youth leaders are advised and supported by the adult leaders.

==== Girl Scouts of the USA ====
Volunteers are important in the GSUSA, but their roles are less defined than in Scouting America.

=== Other countries ===
In other countries, Scouter refers to any adult leader, professional Scout employee, or any Scout alumnus.

== See also ==
- Scout Commissioner
