= Slide of the Month =

Series published in Boys' Life magazine

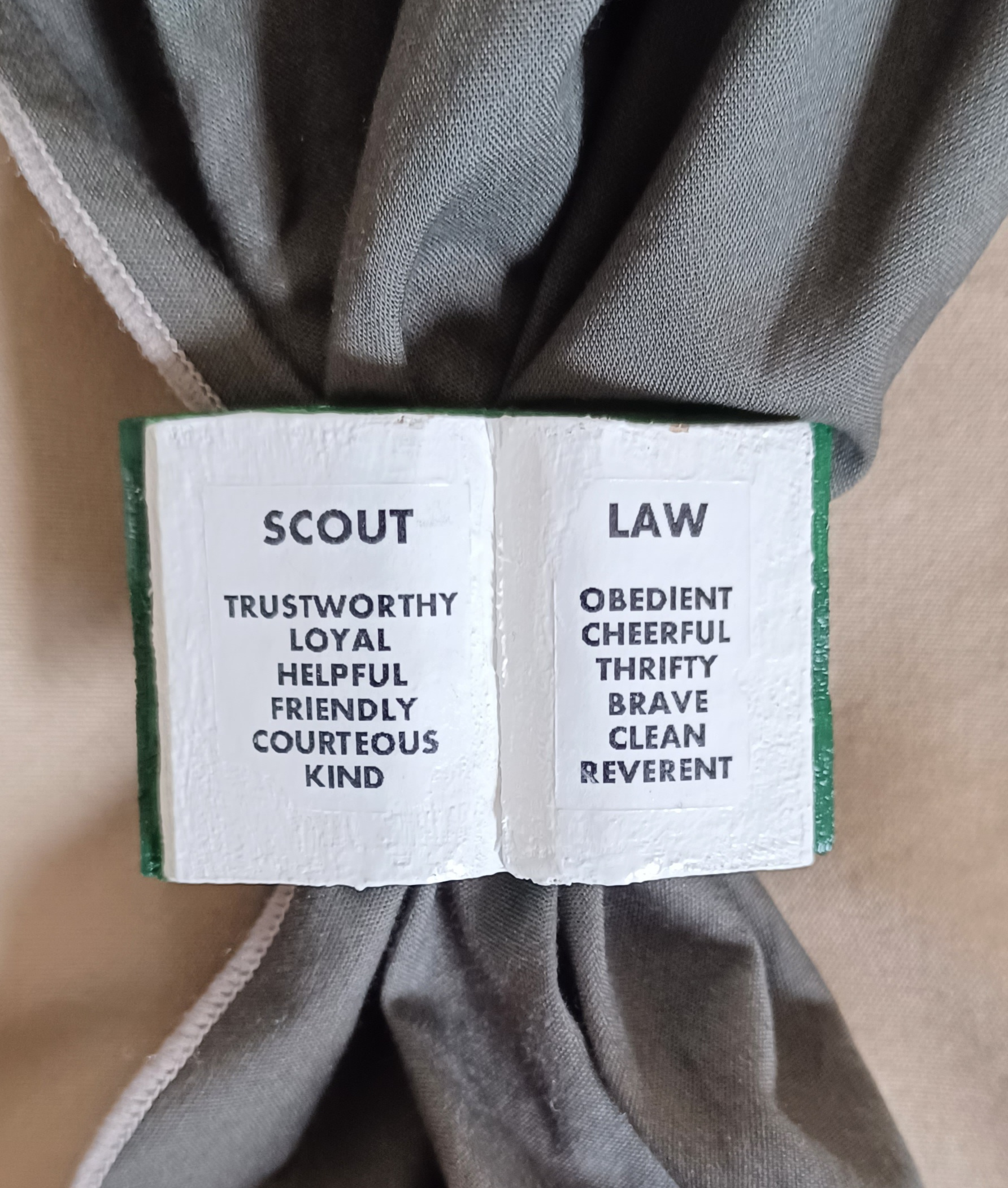
- Modern recreation of the Slide of the Month from February 1959
- Publisher: Boy Scouts of America
- First issue: February 1951
- Final issue: March 2001
- Country: United States
- Language: English

The Slide of the Month was a series of articles published in Boys' Life running from February 1951 to March 2001. Boys' Life was the predecessor to Scout Life, the current magazine published by Boy Scouts of America. Several authors contributed to the articles over the years. Most involved whittling wood. However, other crafts were used for specific projects including beadwork, horn carving, and some metalwork. Common materials such as wood, leather, beads, metal are usually used. However, some unusual materials can be found including animal bone, fungi or pieces of armadillo tail. The frequency varied from one period to another: sometimes monthly and other times only once a year.

Most of the early articles were written by W. Ben Hunt signing occasionally as "Ben Hunt" and most often as Whittlin' Jim. Upon his death, several other contributors took over Slide of the Month.

== Inspiration ==
Inspiration for the slides came from a wide range of subjects commonly appealing to the boys involved in the Boy Scouts at the time.

These include:

- Scouting related activities
- Fauna
- Native American Folklore
- Americana
- Christianity
- Foreign artifacts
- weapons

== The Whittlin' Jim era ==
Prior to starting the Slide of the Month section W. Ben Hunt had been featured in Boys' Life magazine as early as December 1942, where he explained how to build an arctic sled from scratch in his typical ink-and-pen artwork that would later be featured in so many of his slide articles.

Unless stated all Slide of the Month articles in this section were signed by Whittlin' Jim. In parentheses are the materials used to construct the slide.

=== 1940s ===
Starting in 1945, some early work of neckerchief slides by W. Ben Hunt could be seen in Boys' Life. In the February 1945 issue, readers learn how to do beadwork and how it can be used among other things to create slides. The design presented would be reused in the April 1951 issue. In the September 1945 issue an article by W. Ben Hunt was published titled Neckerchief Slides. It featured some of the designs readers would later enjoy in Slide of the Month. In the October 1948 issue featured an article titled Make a Neckerchief Slide by Whittlin' Jim featuring the original Chief Hangs-On made out of wood.

Unless stated all Slide of the Month articles in this section were signed by Whittlin' Jim. In parentheses are the materials used to construct the slide.

=== 1951 ===
- January Ox Yoke (wood)
- February: Moose Head (wood)
- March: Knot Slides (wood) no author listed
- April: Beaded Thunderbird Rosette (beads & leather)
- May: Cow Skull (wood)
- June: Steer Head and Thunder Bird (aluminum) by Ben Hunt
- July: Fishing tackle kit (various) by E.S
- August: Sioux Moccasins (wood)
- September: First aid kit (various) by E.F.S.
- October: Peyote Beadwork (beads & leather) no author listed
- November: Turtle, Katcina Mask and Horned Owl (aluminum)
- December: Ball in a Cage with Rings (wood) no author listed

=== 1952 ===
- January: Leather shield (leather) by Ben Hunt
- February: Arrow (wood)
- March: Tribe O'Slide: Chief Hangs-On, Squaw Hangs-On and Footsie (wood) by Ben Hunt
- April: no article
- May: Ax in a Block (wood)
- June: Hawaiian Aumakuas (wood) no author listed
- July: Hungry Frog (wood)
- August: Philippine Water Buffalo (wood)
- September: Horse's Bit (wood)
- October: Mountain Sheep (cow horn) no author listed
- November: Snowshoe (bamboo & thread)
- December: Walrus (wood)

=== 1953 ===
- January: Northern Totem (wood) signed W.J.
- February: Sabbath Slide (cow horn)
- March: Mass Production Slide* (stamping on wood) signed W.A.
- April: no article
- May: Elephant (wood)
- June: Paul Bunyan (wood)
- July: Packboard (wood & cloth) signed W.J.
- August: no article
- September: Bamboo (bamboo)
- October: Carved Fist (wood)
- November: OA (wood)
- December: Takedown Bucksaw (wood & copper)

*Not labeled as a Slide of the Month in the magazine but instructions are provided to make a slide.

=== 1954 ===
- January: Steer Horns (wood) by Ben Hunt
- February: Hoop Dancer (wood)
- March: no article
- April: Bear eating a salmon (wood)
- May: Indian Neckerchief (wood) by Bud R. Erb
- June: Fungi (wood fungi)
- July: Jaguar (wood)
- August: Key-Key Bird (wood)
- September: Riding Quirt (wood & leather)
- October: Sailors Rosette (cord)
- November: Trout (wood)
- December: Wormy Apple (wood)

=== 1955 ===
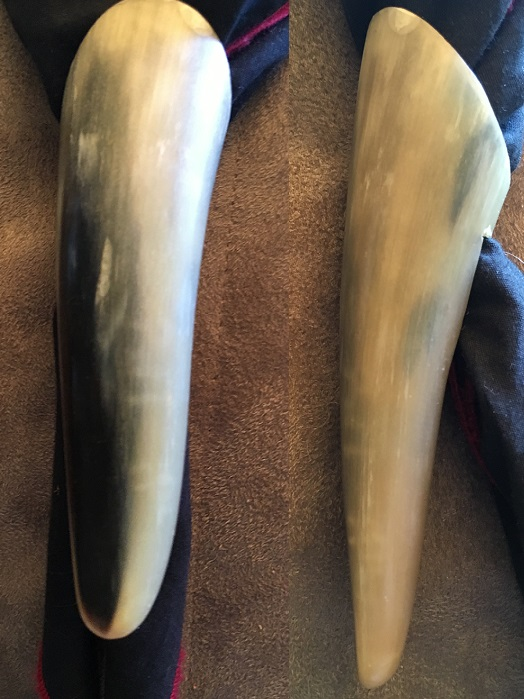
Cow Horn Slide of the Month

- January: Ax in Sheath (wood)
- February: Copper Arrowhead (copper)
- March: The Bold Knight (wood)
- April: Monkey (wood)
- May: Hungry Bass (wood)
- June: Cowhorns and Antlers (cow horn & antlers)
- July: no article
- August: Tepee (wood)
- September: Padlock (wood)
- October: Solomon Island Carving (wood)
- November: Birchbark Canoe (wood)
- December: African Masai Shield (wood)

=== 1956 ===
- January: Jolly Roger (wood)
- February: Pick and Shovel (wood)
- March: Snag Tooth Charlie (wood)
- April: Crosscut Saw in a Log (wood & tin)
- May: Flashlight (leather & flashlight)
- June: Pedro - His Mark (wood)
- July: Tom-Tom (rawhide & tubing)
- August: no article
- September: Rocket Slide (wood)
- October: no article
- November: John Henry (wood)
- December: Old Zeke (wood)

In the December 1956 issue, on page 74 Whittlin' Jim also offered instructions to make a Slide Rack to hold all these slides the Scouts could have done by then.

=== 1957 ===
- January: Copper Foil (copper)
- February: Pin Cone (pin cone)
- March: Peachstone Monkey (wood)
- April: Flying Mallard (wood)
- May: You Name It (wood)
- June: Totem Pole (wood)
- July: Arrowhead (brass or copper) no author listed
- August: no article
- September: Locomotive (wood)
- October: Diving Eagle (wood)
- November: Gooneybird (wood)
- December: Patch Slide (cardboard)

=== 1958 ===
- January: Brass Pipe Tomahawk (brass and wood)
- February: Carved Eagle (wood)
- March: Make This Sundial(brass or copper)
- April: Archery (wood)
- May: Gob [Sailor] (wood)
- June: Cannibal (wood)
- July: Hound Dog (bone)
- August: Busy Beaver (wood)
- September: N.W. Coast Totem (wood)
- October: Old-Oil Lantern (wood)
- November: Water Buffalo (wood)
- December: Little Eskimo (wood)

A special article by Ben Hunt titled Here's How To Whittle Neckerchief Slides was published in the July 1953 issue of Boys’ Life on page 34 followed by illustrations by Whittlin' Jim and Richard E. Williams on page C1.

=== 1959 ===
- January: Pueblo Indian Drum (wood)
- February: Scout Law Book (wood)
- March: Plaque Slides (wood)
- April: A Nutty Squirrel (walnuts)
- May: Button N Things (buttons) by Kenneth W. Damm
- June: The Pretzel (wood)
- July: Blood hound (wood)
- August: Hand Grenade (wood)
- September: Motor Boat (wood)
- October: A Rugged Scotsman (wood)
- November: Jenny Wren House (wood)
- December: Crossed Skis (wood)

=== 1960 ===
- January: Block House (wood)
- February: Sunday Slide (wood)
- March: Knot Slide (wood) no author listed
- April: Giant Titanus Beetle (wood)
- May: Ice Cream Cone (wood)
- June: Imbedded Arrowhead (bone & arrow head)
- July: Ole' Man of Hawaii (wood)
- August: Milkweed Butterfly (wood & paper)
- September: Just Call Him Sorrowful [dog] (wood)
- October: Boiled Lobster (wood)
- November: Paul Bunyan's Hollow Tooth (wood)
- December: Hide Frame (wood & hide)

The February 1960 issue featured a How to Make It... Jubilee Patch Neckerchief Slide instructional in full color.

=== 1961 ===
- January: Texas Longhorn (wood)
- February: Pueblo Indian Pottery (wood)
- March: Tarascan Indian Mask (wood)
- April: Easter Island Stone Face (wood)
- May: Ouch! (wood)
- June: Gaff, The Sailor (wood)
- July: Old Vet (wood)
- August: Lincoln Log Cabin (wood)
- September: For Special Award [Giant Match for Scout Masters] (wood)
- October: Derringer (wood)
- November: Bacon an' Eggs (wood)
- December: no article

The December 1961 issue features an Elephant Neckerchief Slide instructional in full color made of an inner tube instead of the Slide of the Month.

=== 1962 ===
- January: Neckerchief Slides* (various) by Maurice Naggiar
- February: Thermometers (wood)
- March: Little Stinker [skunk] (wood)
- April: Mexican Zapotec Mask (wood)
- May: Cow Horn Indian Chief (cow horn)
- June: Armadillo Slide (armadillo tail)
- July: Surfboard (wood)
- August: Skygeek from Mars (wood)
- September: Pedro [Donkey] (wood)
- October: Pirate Cannon (wood)
- November: Miniature Knot Board (plywood & string)
- December: no article

* Not labeled as a Slide of the Month but located in the space usually reserved for these articles.

=== 1963 ===
- January: no article (replaced by a Pedro slide title I'll Be With You Always! made of paper)
- February: no article (replaced by a instructional by Ben Hunt for a Neckerchief Slide Rack)
- March: Survival Kit (various) by William Poese
- April: no article
- May: Fire Drill (wood)
- June: The Tenderfoot Camper (wood)
- July: South Sea Island Slides (wood)
- August: Painted Turtle (wood)
- September: no article
- October: Watch-Work Slide (watch)
- November: no article (replaced with a detailed instructional on how to Whittle Slides by Whittlin' Jim)
- December: no article

=== 1964 ===
- January: no article
- February: no article
- March: Monkey Slide (wood)
- April: no article
- May: Sittin' Pretty [Mouse and Cheese] (wood)
- June: Life Ring (wood)
- July: Fourth of July (wood)
- August: Bugle (wood)
- September: Bongo Drums (wood)
- October: no article
- November: Bullfrog (wood)
- December: no article

=== 1965 ===
- January: no article
- February: no article
- March: Prospector's Poke Flint-and-Steel Kit (various) by William Poese
- April: no article
- May: no article
- June: Siesta Slide (wood)
- July: Reflector Oven (wood & other materials)
- August: no article
- September: Sea Horse (wood)
- October: Sewing-Kit Slide (various) by Bill Poese
- November: Korea (wood)
- December: Cider Keg (wood)

=== 1966 ===
- January: no article
- February: Emergency Slides (rope)
- March: Artist's Palette (wood)
- April: jackknife (jackknife)
- May: Chain Slide (wood)
- June: Chinese Figurine (wood)
- July: no article
- August: no article
- September: Goal Kick (wood)
- October: no article (full color instructional titled: You Can Make Neckerchief Slides)
- November: Apple Core (wood)
- December: Gourd Slide (gourd)

=== 1967 ===
- January: Cob Of Corn (wood)
- February: no article
- March: no article
- April: no article
- May: no article
- June: no article
- July: no article
- August: no article
- September: no article
- October: Black Knight (wood)
- November: Hikin' Boots (wood)
- December: Yacht (wood & fabric)

=== 1968 ===
- January: no article
- February: no article
- March: no article
- April: Wood slice - Sawed Sumac (wood)
- May: no article
- June: no article
- July: no article
- August: African Mali Mask (wood)
- September: no article
- October: Emblem of Freedom (wood)
- November: no article
- December: Guitar (wood)

=== 1969 ===
- January: Eskimo Billykin (wood)
- February: no article
- March: Clip Board (wood)
- April: no article
- May: no article
- June: Iron Kettle (wood)
- July: no article
- August: no article
- September: Cree Toboggan Slide (wood)
- October: Black Walnut Slide (walnut)
- November: O.A. Slide (wood)
- December: A What's-It Slide (wood)

=== 1970 ===
- January: Miniature Mounted Trophy (wood)
- February: no article
- March: Blacksmith's Anvil Slide* (wood)
- April: no article
- May: Cherry Pie Slide* (various)
- June: no article
- July: no article
- August: no article
- September: no article
- October: no article*
- November: no article
- December: no article

* Ben "Whittlin' Jim" Hunt's death was announced to the readers of Boys' Life in the Hitchin' Rack section. In this section, readers could write in and get answers from Pedro, the magazine's mascot. Ben Hunt had died on March 30, 1970. They also announced that the section would remain but not happen every month.

=== W. Ben Hunt's slide legacy ===
In the June 1981 issue of Boys’ Life, it was announced that the Ben Hunt neckerchief slide collection containing all the slides he made for Slide of the Month would be on display at the 1981 National Jamboree in Fort A.P. Hill, Virginia. It was again on display at the 1985 National Scout Jamboree in July 1985 which took place at the same location as the 1981 event.

A full-color article was published on pages 22 to 24 called Masters of the Neckerchief Slide which featured full-color pictures of some of Ben Hunt's Slide of the Month creations. It also talks about Lauren "Lew" Weston who was first inspired to carve slides after seeing Ben's creations and who later contributed to the column after Ben's death.

== Post Whittlin' Jim era ==
=== Slide of the Month continues (1971–1974) ===
Following the death of Whittlin' Jim, articles became rarer, with only a few coming out each year.

- March 1971: Slide of the Month article with reprints of some past articles: Neckerchief Slide Contest Winners (1953), Sundial (1958), African Masai Shield (1955), Fishing Tackle (1951), Block House (1960), First-aid Kit (1951), Carved Ball in a Cage (1951) and Pedro - His Mark (1956).
- November 1971: Observation Tester (wood) by John Taylor.
- December 1971: Rock and Mineral Specimens (minerals) by John Taylor.
- July 1972: Pedro's Lucky Shoe (wood) no author listed.
- September 1972: Cable Car (wood) no author listed.
- January 1973: Pancake Stack (pancake mix) no author listed.
- April 1974: Smiley (wood) by William D. Fleming and John Taylor.

=== Title temporarily dropped (1975–1979) ===
From April 1975 to August 1979, the name Slide of the Month was dropped. However, articles were still being published a few times a year and followed the style and format set by the previous authors: the name of the slide, a few paragraphs explaining the process with a picture of the finished slide, and detailed plans at the bottom. The entire article would fit in a quarter or half page of the magazine.

- April 1975: Carve-a-face Slide (wood) by Bill Burch and John Taylor.
- July 1975: Battle Drum (wood) by Wayne Mason.
- August 1975: Wooden Canteen (wood) by Wayne Mason.
- February 1976: Roll Out the Barrel (wood) by Wayne Mason.
- August 1976: Windmill Slide (wood) by Wayne Mason.
- June 1977: Road Sign Slides (wood) by Wayne Mason.
- September 1977: A Leather Neckerchief Slide (leather) by Glenn Wagner and David Gewirtz.
- February 1978: A Basketball Net Slide (wood & metal) by Wayne Mason.
- May 1978: Stamp Neckerchief Slide (wood & postage stamp) by Wayne Mason.
- May 1979: Popsicle Slide (wood) by Wayne Mason.
- August 1979: Whistle Slide (wood) by Tom Dwyer.

=== Slide of the Month' Returns (1979- ) ===
In September 1979, the Slide of the Month title reappeared. It is unclear why it was not used for several years.

==== 1979 ====
- September 1979: An artist's Palette Slide (wood) by Wayne Mason.

==== 1980s ====
- March 1980: Woodland Slide (wood) by Wayne Mason.
- April 1980: Shell Slides (sea shell) by Wayne Mason.
- October 1980: Jack-O-Lantern Slide (wood) by Wayne Mason.
- November 1980: Checkerboard Slide (wood) no author listed.
- January 1981: Seagull Slide (wood) by Wayne Mason.
- July 1982: Indian Plaque Slides: Corn Dancer, Sun Burst and Thunderbird (wood) by Lauren E. (Ol' Lew) Weston.
- December 1982: Eggs 'n Bacon (button) by Kenneth Koob.
- May 1983: Bow-Legged Cowboy (wood) by Fritz Hines.
- June 1983: Pizza (lid from an biscuit tube) by Kenneth Koob.
- July 1983: Dental Disaster (wood) by Fritz Hines.
- August 1983: Billy Goat (wood) by Lauren E. (Ol' Lew) Weston.
- October 1983: Camp Lantern (various) by Bill Andrews.
- November 1983: Dutch Oven Dinner (wood) by Kenneth Koob.
- February 1984: Backpack (wood and leather) by Bill Andrews.
- April 1984: States (wood) by Bill Andrews.
- May 1984: Kachina (wood) by Fritz Hines.
- August 1984: Clown (wood) by Fritz Hines.
- September 1984: Happy Hound (wood) by Lew Weston.
- December 1984: Old Tooth Nose (wood) by Lew Weston.
- May 1985: Bucking Burro (wood) by Lew Weston.
- October 1985: Puzzler's Cube (Rubik's Cube) (wood) by Tell and Don Gubler.
- December 1985: Troop Number (wood) by Lew Weston.
- October 1986: Sundial (wood) by George E. Haddad.
- January 1987: Acorn (wood) by Bill Fleming.
- March 1987: Turtle Shell (wood) by Bill D. Fleming.
- April 1987: Ladybug (wood) by Bill Fleming.
- July 1987: Postage Stamp (wood) by Robert Schleicher.
- August 1987: Abacus (wood) by Tell and Don Gubler.
- December 1987: Square Knot (wood) by Bill Fleming.
- July 1988: Diamondback (wood) by Lew Weston.
- September 1988: Camp Saw (wood) by Bill Andrews.
- August 1989: Mess Kit (wood) by Bill Andrews.

==== 1990s ====
- March 1990: "Pedro" The Boy's Life Mail Burro (wood) inspired by Whittin's Jim design. Article in full color
- November 1990: Holiday Wreath (wood) by Terry Gilbert.
- January 1991: Canoe Paddle (wood) by Terry Gilbert.
- October 1991: Old Zeke (wood) by Whittlin' Jim. Reprint of the December 1956 instructions.
- November 1991: The Clipboard (wood & paper) by Martin I. Engel.
- December 1991: Longhorn Skull (wood) by Lew Weston.
- June 1992: Howling Coyote (wood) by Jeff Springer.
- July 1992: Baden-Powell's Hat (wood) by James C. Hansen Sr.
- September 1992: The Pirate (wood) by Jeff Springer.
- December 1992: Old-time Sled (wood) by Jeff Springer.
- July 1993: The Firecracker (wood) by Jeff Springer.
- September 1993: The Soaring Eagle (wood) by Jeff Springer.
- October 1993: Pole Crest Slide (wood) by Jeff Springer.
- December 1993: Snowman (wood) by Jeff Springer.
- April 1994: The Pin Slide (wood) by Jeff Springer.
- August 1994: The State Slide (wood) by Jeff Springer.
- September 1994: Cowboy Chaps (Leather) by Jeff Springer.
- October 1994: Cartoon Fish Slide (wood) by Jeff Springer.
- November 1994: Jack-o'-Lantern Slide (wood) by Don Gubler.
- September 1995: Beaver (wood) by Jeff Springer.
- November 1995: The Arrowhead (wood) by Jeff Springer.
- July 1997: The shield Slide (wood) by Jeff Springer.
- February 1998: The Fox Slide (wood) by Jeff Springer.
- August 1998: The Viking (wood) by Jeff Springer.
- February 1999: Bison Skull (wood) by Carl Bailey.
- July 1999: Liberty Bell (wood) by Will Scarlett.

==== 2000s ====
- January 2000: Tomahawk Slide (wood) by Jeff Springer.
- June 2000: The Shield Slide (wood) by Jeff Springer.
- August 2000: The Dolphin Slide (wood) by Rene H. Bonneau.
- March 2001: Rattlesnake (wire & tubing) by Luke Fisher (Troop 109, Phoenix, AZ).

== Merchandise associated with Slide of the Month ==
=== Neckerchief carving kits ===
The Supply Division of Boy Scouts of America offered in the 1970s several neckerchief slide carving kits based on Slide of the Month models of years past that could be ordered by mail or found locally at some Boy Scouts equipment distributors.

These kits (with catalog numbers) were sold 29 cents in 1971:

- Steer Head (1770)
- Paul Bunyan (1771)
- Indian Head (1772)
- Indian Chief (1774)
- Cosmo the Cosmic Crow (1775)
- Scout Sign (1776)
- Flying Eagle (1777)

Two extra kits were available that same year:

- Kachina Doll Totem Pole (1602) for $1.45
- Mortuary Totem Pole (1603) for 89 cents

=== Plastic castings ===
Some of the designs along with other designs were later cast in plastic and sold in Scout stores for 45 cents each in 1972:

- Cross (1779)
- Three Monkeys (1780)
- Panfish (1781)
- Frying Pan with Eggs (1782)
- Indian Chief (1783)
- Eagle (1784)
- Scout Hand Sign (1785)
- Arrowhead (1786)
- Horse Head (1787)
- Indian (1788)
- Ax in Log (1789)
- Hiker's Shoe Sole (1790)

=== Other items ===
A Whitting Set could also be purchased. It contained a Handi-Kraft knife, five blades and four cutout carving blocks sold for $2.25 in 1971.

A booklet was also available containing reprints of the Slide of the Month. It was sold for 25 cents in 1971 and could be picked up at the local Scout store or ordered by mail.

== See also ==
- Friendship knot, instead of a slide
- Woggle as an alternative to a slide
- Neal Manufacturing Company neckerchief slide US company
- Woggle hopping activity
