= Bath Council =

Bath Council may refer to:

- Bath, Somerset
- Bath Council, BSA
