= Oxford County Council =

Oxford County Council may be:

- Oxfordshire County Council
- Oxford County Council (Maine)
- Oxford County Council (Ontario)
