= Auburn Council =

Auburn Council may be:

- City of Auburn, Sydney, Australia
- Auburn Council BSA, Maine, United States of America
- Auburn Council BSA, New York, United States of America
