= Friendship knot loop =

Type of knot

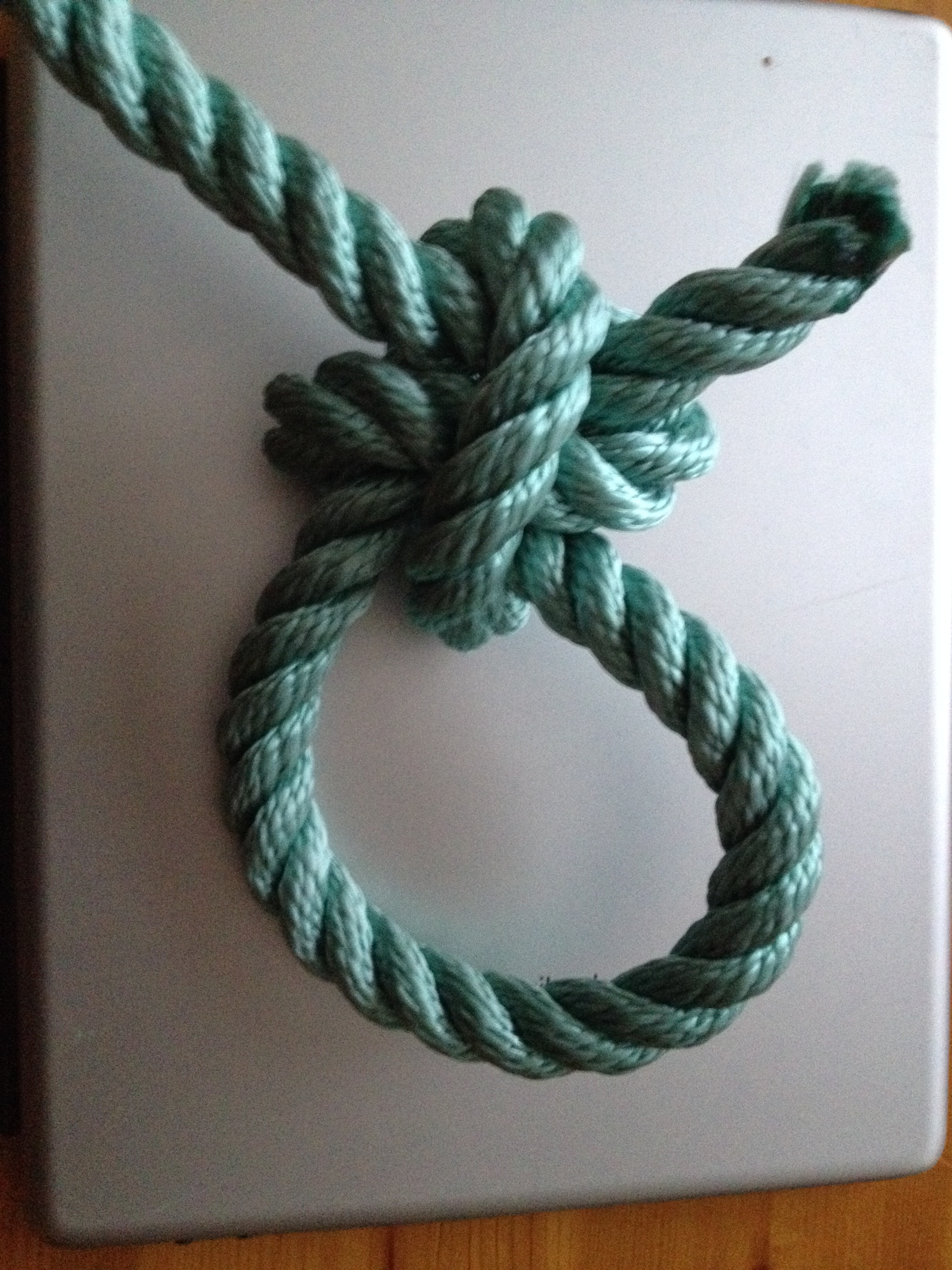
- Names: Friendship knot loop, Chinese crown knot loop, Slipped friendship knot loop, Sliding Chinese crown knot loop
- Category: Loop
- Related: Friendship knot
- ABoK: #1032

Friendship knot loop is a knot to tie a secure and stable loop at the end of a rope.

The slipped version where the last move is done with a bight of the end, rather than with the end itself, is one that can be tightened flat, slid, locked (like a belt buckle), and then untied quickly (like when nature calls) with an exploding pop. If not tightened flat, this Slipped friendship knot loop collapses into a cube and will neither slide nor pop.

== Tying ==
Like tying a friendship knot, except that it is tied to the ropes own end, coming back from forming the loop.

== See also ==
- List of knots
- Friendship knot
