= Woggle =

Device to fasten a neckerchief

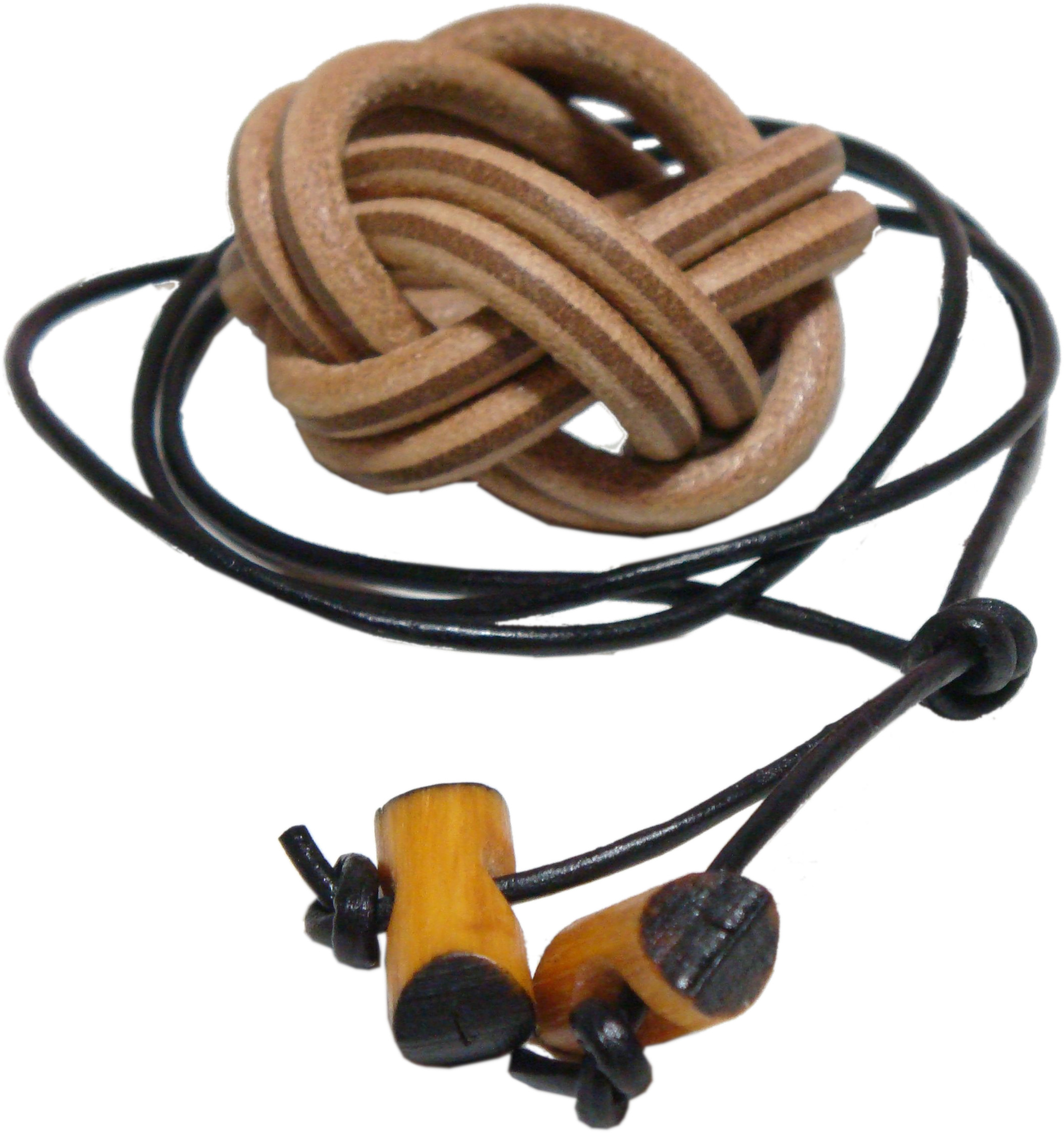
A Gilwell Woggle and Wood Badge

A woggle (or neckerchief slide) is a device to fasten the neckerchief, or scarf, worn as part of the Scout or Girl Guides uniform, originated by a Scout in the 1920s.

In form and function, a woggle is similar to the Tie ring, a formal piece of jewelry used to secure the bulk of a Necktie or an Ascot tie, popularized in the 1800s.

== Name origin ==
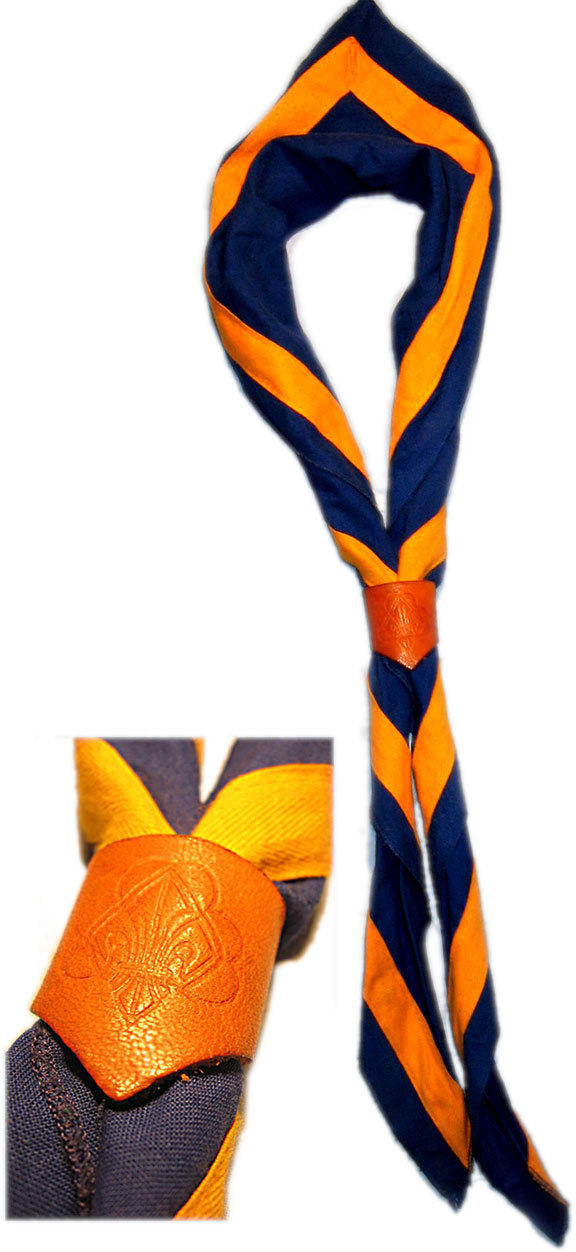
A German Scout neckerchief and woggle

One story relating to the origin of the word 'woggle' is that it was named to rhyme with the word boon doggle used in America. However the term woggle pre-dates the first known reference to this in 1925. There are a few other references to the word woggle before its adoption by the Scout movement. It is thought that woggle was a verb, with similar meanings to waggle and wobble, in the 16th century. It was in limited use as a noun around 1900.

Another report is that William 'Bill' Shankley, while working at Gilwell Park with Scouting's founder, prior to 1922, called it a woggle, 'a name given to something without a name'.

=== Earliest use ===
The earliest known reference to a woggle is the June 1923 edition of British The Scout. The term was quickly applied to other designs of fastener, of many shapes and sizes, and is today used around the world.

The word ring was used in editions of the Scouting handbook Scouting for Boys until 1929 when Baden-Powell changed it in the 14th edition:

It [the scarf] may be fastened at the throat by a knot or woggle, which is some form of ring made of cord, metal or bone, or anything you like.

== Design origins ==
Early Scouts tied a knot in their neckerchief (scarf) to fasten it around the neck. In the United States, experiments were made with rings made from bone, rope or wood.

A young British Scouter, Bill Shankley, who was responsible for running a workshop and developing ideas for camping equipment at Gilwell Park, became aware of the American rings, and set out to create something similar. The result was the Gilwell Woggle.

On the origin of the woggle, Shankley said:

They used to knot their scarves, which used to get creased and stick out at the ends. But in America the early Scouts used to plait up various stuffs to make a ring for theirs — they called it a boon-doggle. I got some thin sewing machine leather belting, plaited it into a neat ring, submitted it, and had it accepted. I called it a Woggle and that's the name it's known by throughout the world.

== Woggles ==
=== Gilwell Woggle ===
A Finnish Gilwell Woggle

The Turk's head knot woggle designed by Bill Shankley became known as the Gilwell Woggle, as it has been traditionally presented to leaders who have completed their Wood Badge training. Trained leaders are admitted into 1st Gilwell Park Scout Troop, with the Gilwell Woggle as one of its symbols (since at least 1926). Because of its association with leader training, it is not worn by other Scouts.

Shankley's original Gilwell woggle is at the Scout Heritage Museum in Tasmania.

=== New Zealand Scout woggle ===
New Zealand Scout woggle

The New Zealand Scouts sometimes use a plastic woggle in the shape of a traditional Maori carved head. More commonly though warranted leaders trained to Gilwell Woggle standard are allowed to wear the "traditional" leather Turk's head woggle. Keas, Cubs, Scouts, Venturers and Rovers all wear either a "standard" woggle for their section, or home-made "special occasion" woggles such as the tiki mentioned above. Until trained to the Gilwell woggle level, leaders wear a plaited leather woggle with a dome fastening.

== Other names ==
Although the name woggle is used in many English-speaking countries, in the United States, the term woggle is reserved for the turk's head knot used to secure the neckerchief of Wood Badge participants. In the US, the object used to secure the neckerchief is called a neckerchief slide.

=== Neckerchief slides in the United States ===
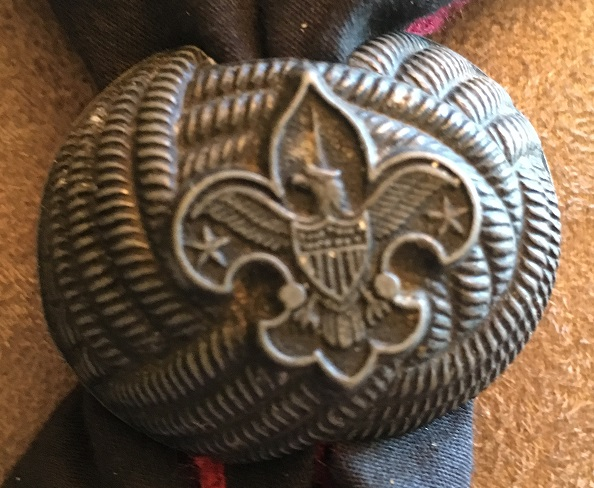
Standard BSA metal scout slide

An early photographic reference to a slide is in the Boy Scouts of America (BSA) magazine Scouting of 1 April 1917. The cover for November 1917 issue prominently shows a Scout wearing a slide to hold the neckerchief in place.

In the BSA magazine Scouting from August 1923, the term "slip-on" and "slide" are both referenced. There is an example of a rams head made of bone and an illustration on how to make your own Turk's head slip-on. The article also comments that the neckerchief should be tied using the four-in-hand knot (often used to tie a necktie) when not using a slide.

Two months later, Boys' Life magazine repeated many of the article key points. The name slide or neckerchief slide appears as early as October 1923 with a discussion of the slide being a smart addition to the neckerchief and having some benefits over a knot to tie the neckerchief on. The article makes reference to making a troop's or patrol's own slide. In the same article, on page 63, the slide is referred to as a "Slip-On".

In the 1930s through the 2000s, Boys' Life magazine (the Boy Scouts of America youth magazine) promoted the use and making of slides through articles and Slide Contests.

In the 1920s and 1930s, Boys' Life sponsored contests for unique slides, and winning designs were featured in the magazine. In the late 1940s, a feature article called Slide of the Month began to grace the pages. Most of the articles were written by W. Ben Hunt from Hales Corners, Wisconsin under the pen name "Whittlin' Jim". Many of the slide ideas were sent into the magazine by Scouts and Scouters as evidenced by the notes Jim included in the article thanking individuals for the slide ideas. After Mr. Hunt's death in the early 1970s, several authors took on the "Slide of the Month" responsibility. The last article was printed in March 2001, the "Rattlesnake" made from wire, tube, colored tape, beads, and googly eyes. Over 300 Slide of the Month articles appeared in Boys' Life magazine.

The first appearance of the term "woggle" in Boys' Life was in February 1966 with reference to a question in a quiz, asking what woggle is to a British Scout.

== See also ==
- Friendship knot, in lieu of a woggle
- Neal Manufacturing Company neckerchief slide US company
- Woggle hopping activity
