= Friendship knot =

Type of knot

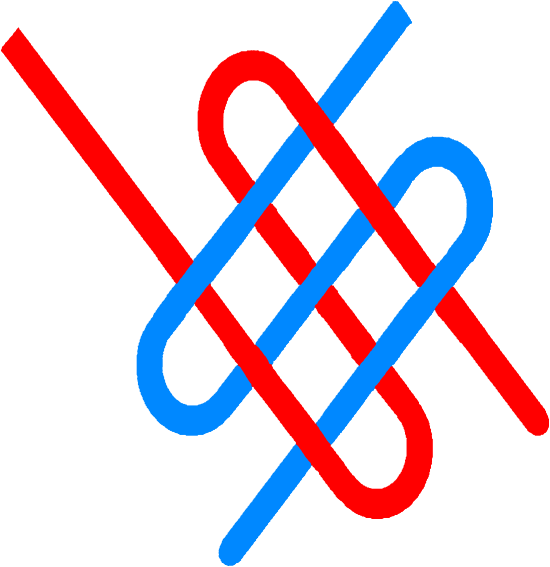
- Friendship knot
- Names: Friendship knot, Chinese cross knot, Japanese crown knot, Square knot (British usage), Success knot, Rustler's knot, Buckaroo knot
- Category: Decorative
- Origin: China
- Related: Carrick bend
- Typical use: Neckerchieves, lanyards and Chinese knotting
- ABoK: #808, #809, #1032, #1066, #1423

The friendship knot is a decorative knot which is used to tie neckerchieves, lanyards and in Chinese knotting.

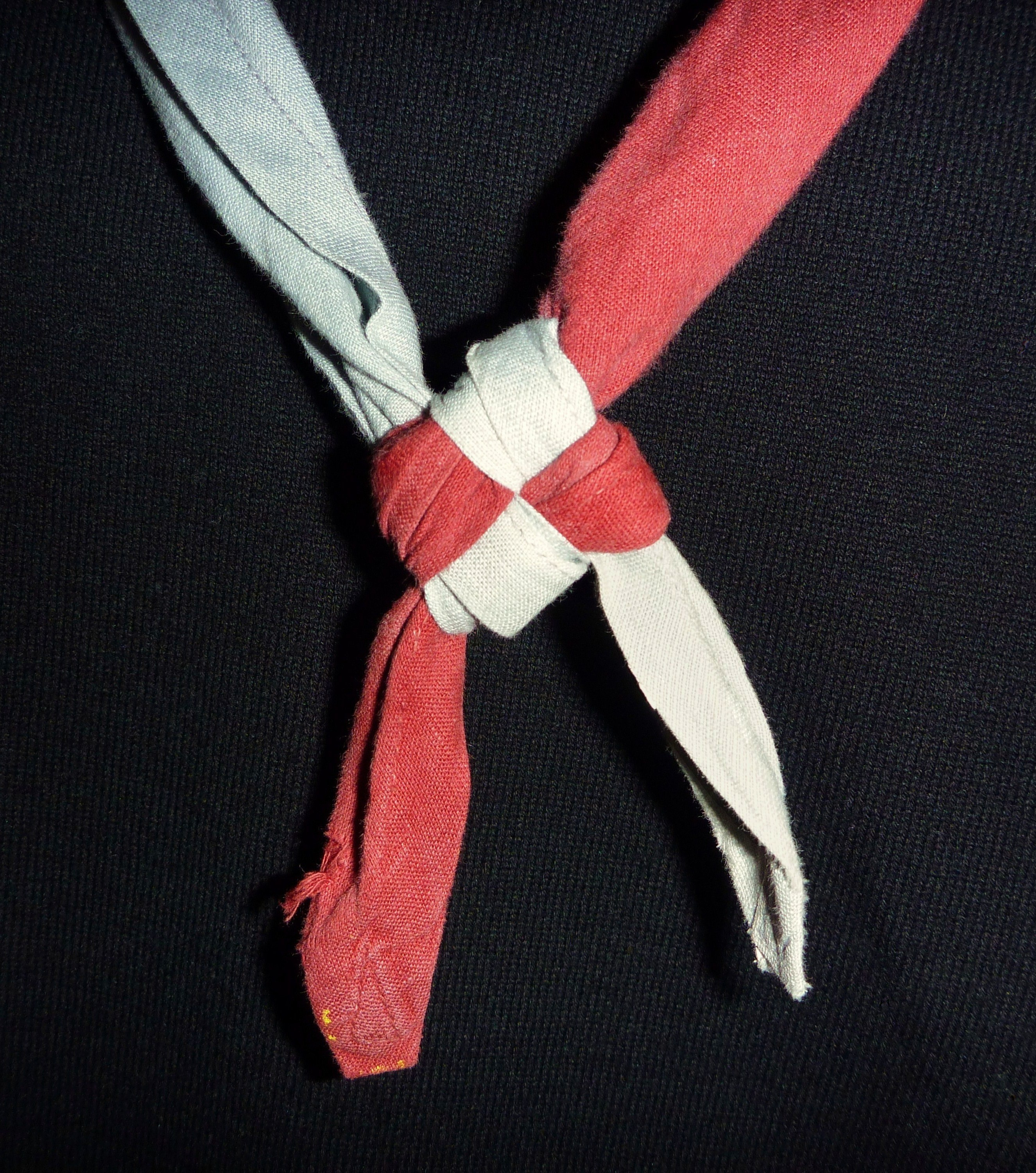
A two-coloured Scout neckerchief tied with a friendship knot.

== History and use ==
This is one of the eleven basic knots of traditional Chinese knotting, a craft which began in the Tang and Song dynasty (960–1279 AD) in China. The Chinese and Japanese names for this knot are based on the shape of the ideogram for the number ten, which is in the shape of a cross that appears on one face (and a square on the other face). The Ashley Book of Knots, first published in 1944, says: "A decorative Chinese Loop. This is commonly employed as a Lanyard Knot. It is handsome and secure." In recent years, it has become popular with members of the Scout and Guide movements for tying their neckerchieves instead of using a woggle.

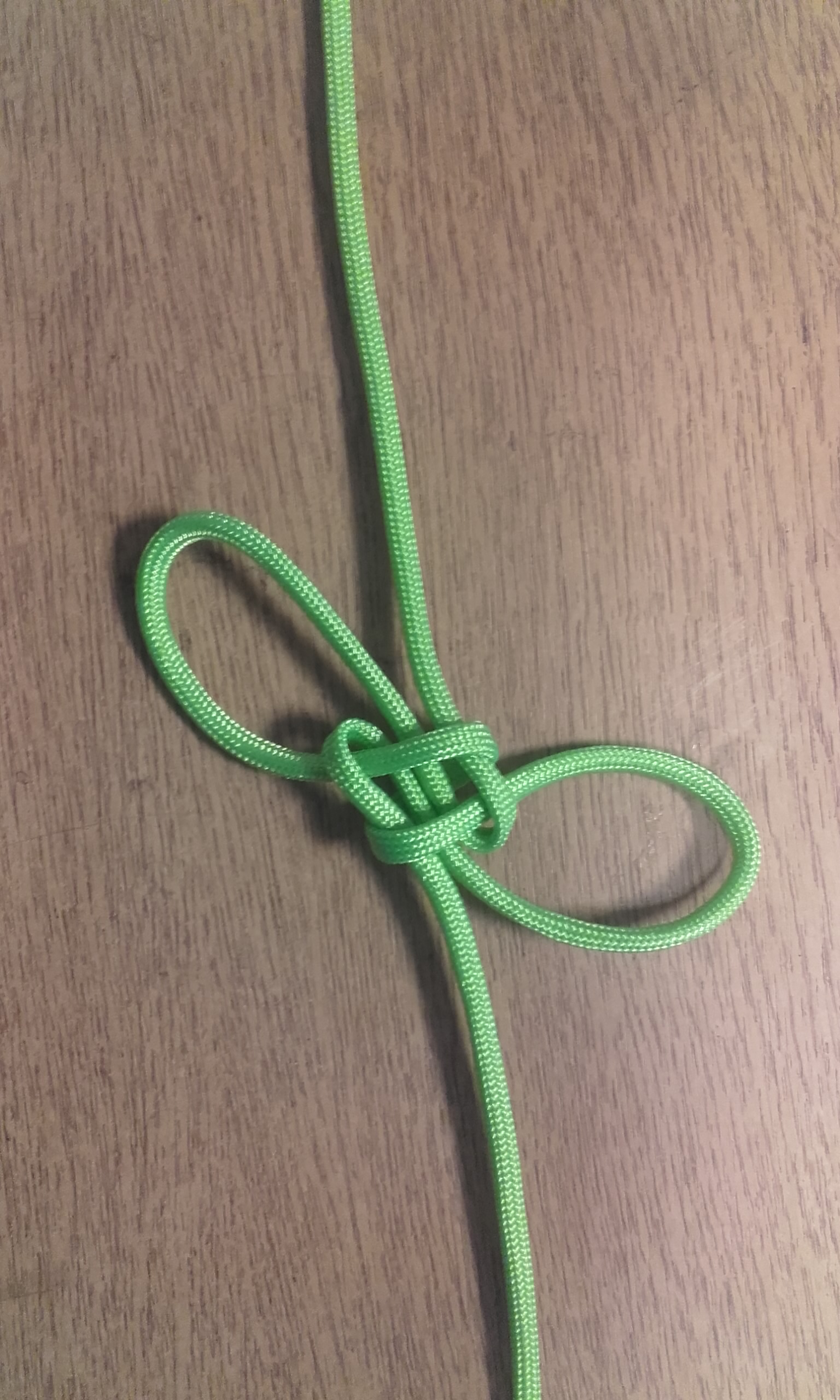
A winged cross knot.

A more complicated version of this knot with a loop on either side is called a winged cross knot in Chinese knotting and macramé.

== See also ==
- Friendship knot loop
- Diamond knot (also known as the "Friendship knot")
- Square knot
