= Neckerchief =

Type of neckwear

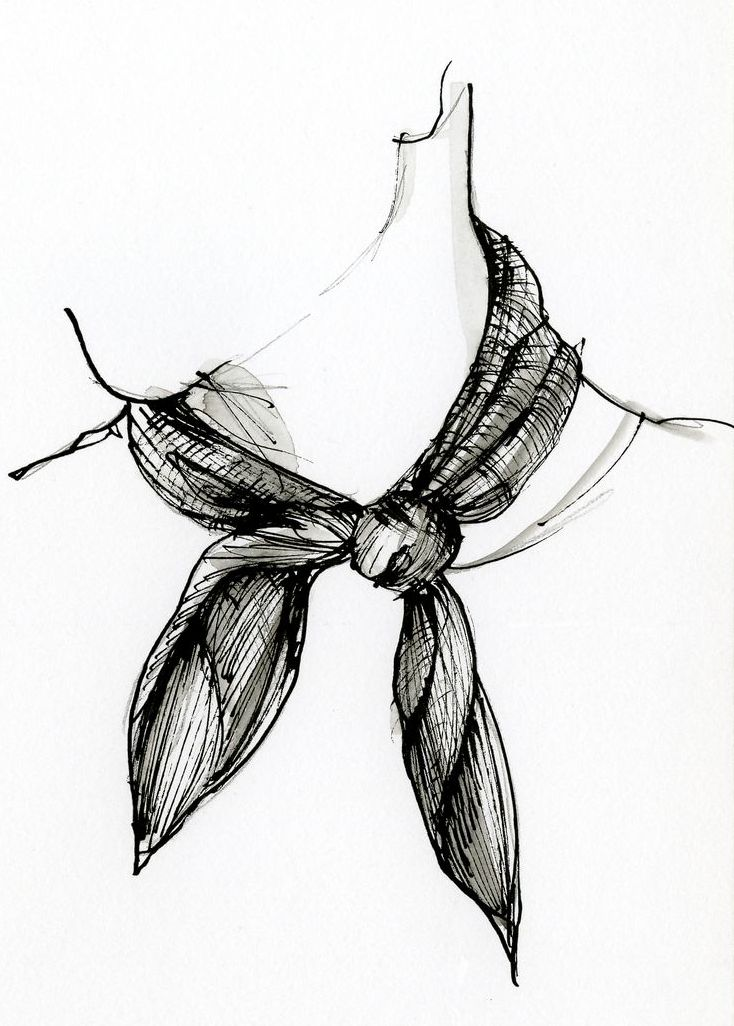
A knotted neckerchief

A neckerchief (from neck (n.) + kerchief), also kerchief, scarf, and bandana, is a type of neckwear associated with those working or living outdoors, including farm laborers, cowboys and sailors. It is most commonly still seen today in the Scouts, Girl Guides and other similar youth movements. A neckerchief consists of a triangular piece of cloth or a rectangular piece folded into a triangle. The long edge is rolled towards the point, leaving a portion unrolled. The neckerchief is then fastened around the neck with the ends either tied or clasped with a slide or woggle.

== History ==
=== Terracotta Army ===
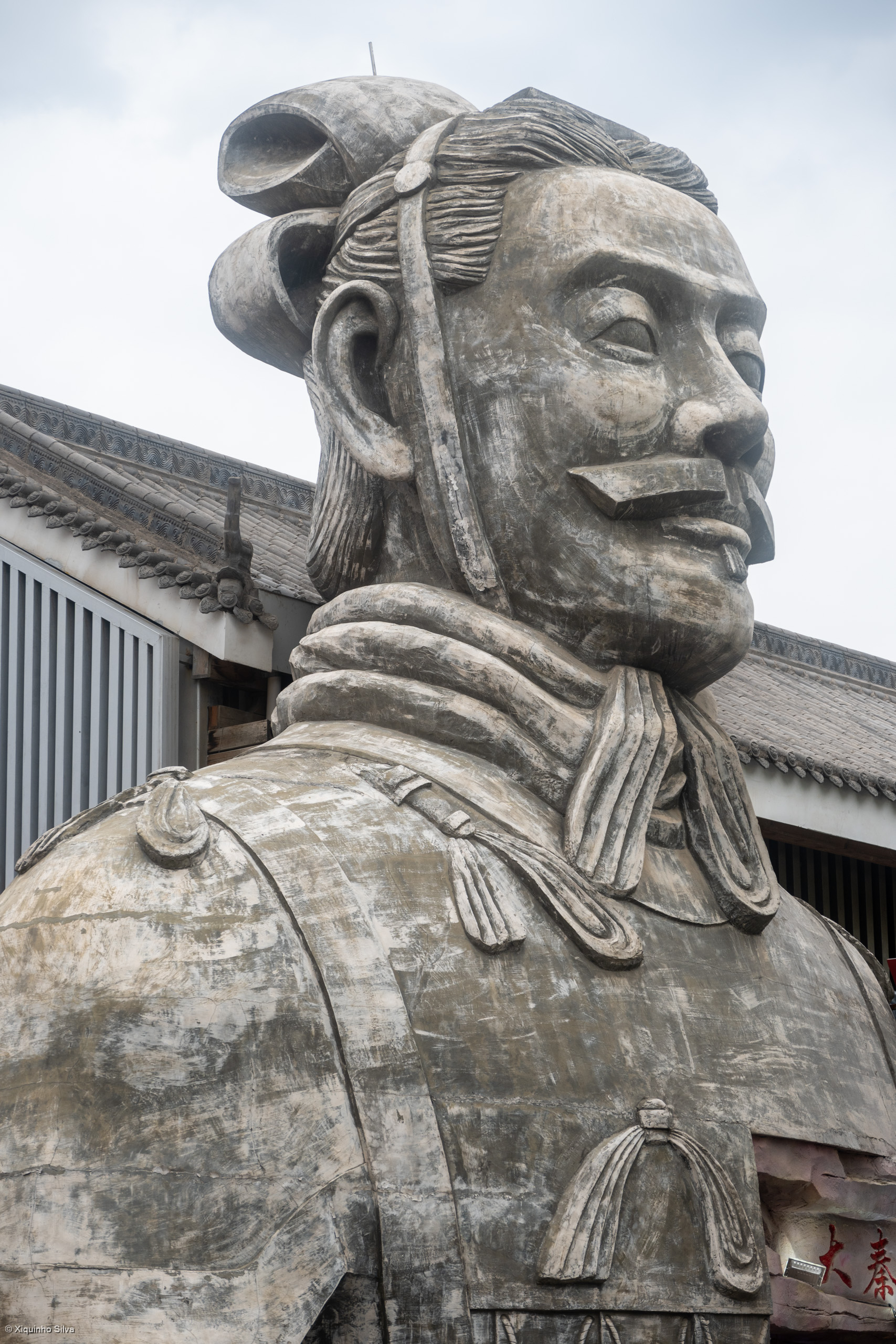
Terracotta soldier with a neckerchief

The figures of the Terracotta Army, dating from the 3rd century BCE, are notable for prominently featuring neckerchiefs, as each of the approximately 7,500 statues is depicted wearing one. This detail is particularly unusual, as no comparable artistic or sculptural evidence of neck cloths appears in Chinese or other world cultures for many centuries thereafter.

Contemporary Chinese textile production was capable of manufacturing silk in appropriate dimensions for such garments. Historical sources from 16 BCE, during the reign of Emperor Ch’eng Ti, document the distribution of one million bolts of silk to a frontier garrison, each measuring approximately 10 meters in length and 53 centimeters in width. Despite this technological capacity, the practice of wearing neckerchiefs appears to have been limited to the imperial guard of Qin Shi Huang. The specific purpose or symbolism of this neckwear remains uncertain.

=== Navy ===
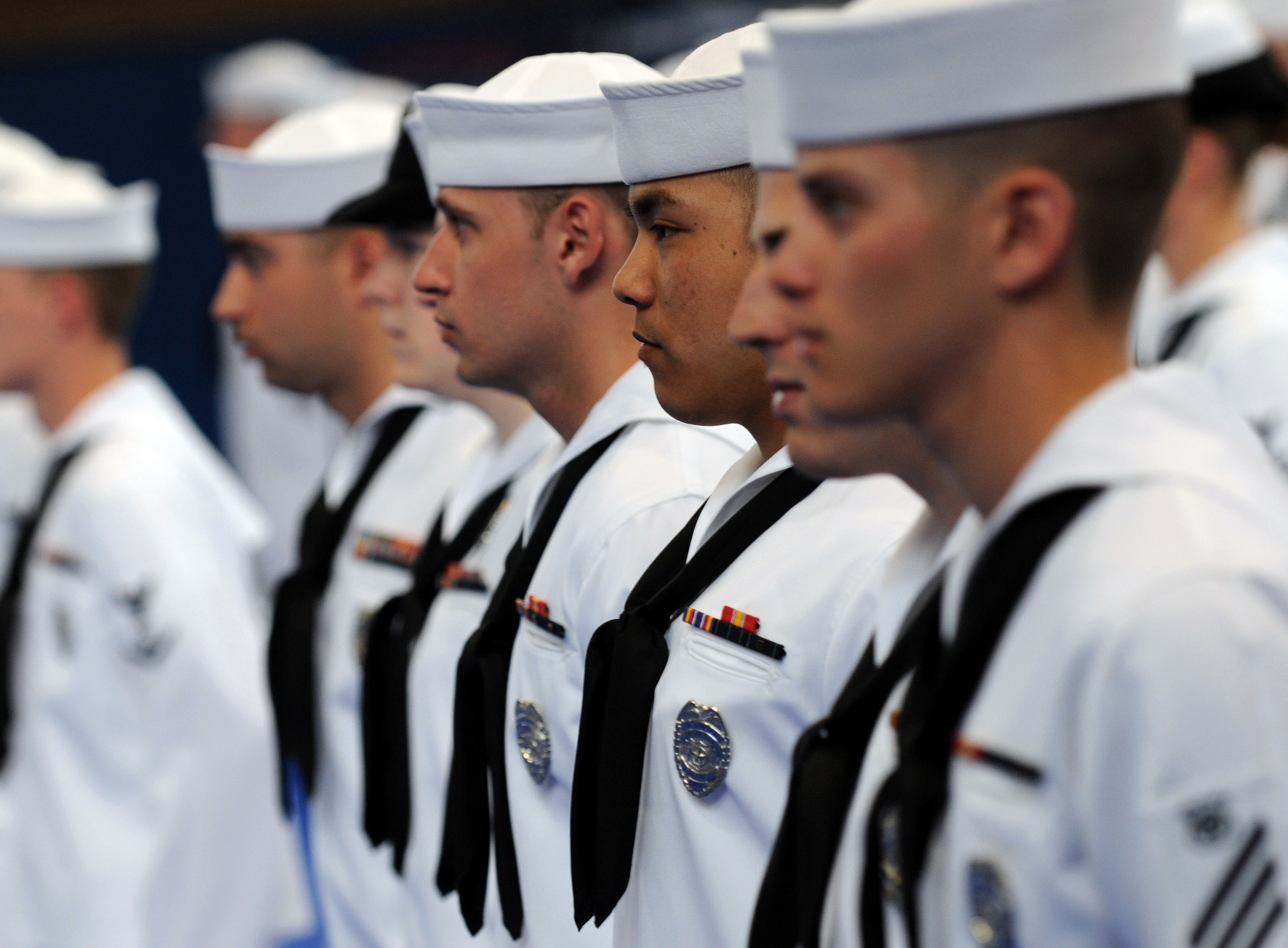
Sailors of the US Navy in Service Dress White Uniforms with their neckerchiefs

Sailors in the United States Navy have worn a rolled black neckerchief since the American Civil War. It is currently part of the men's service dress uniform for junior enlisted sailors as well as the women's summer dress uniform.

=== Scouting ===
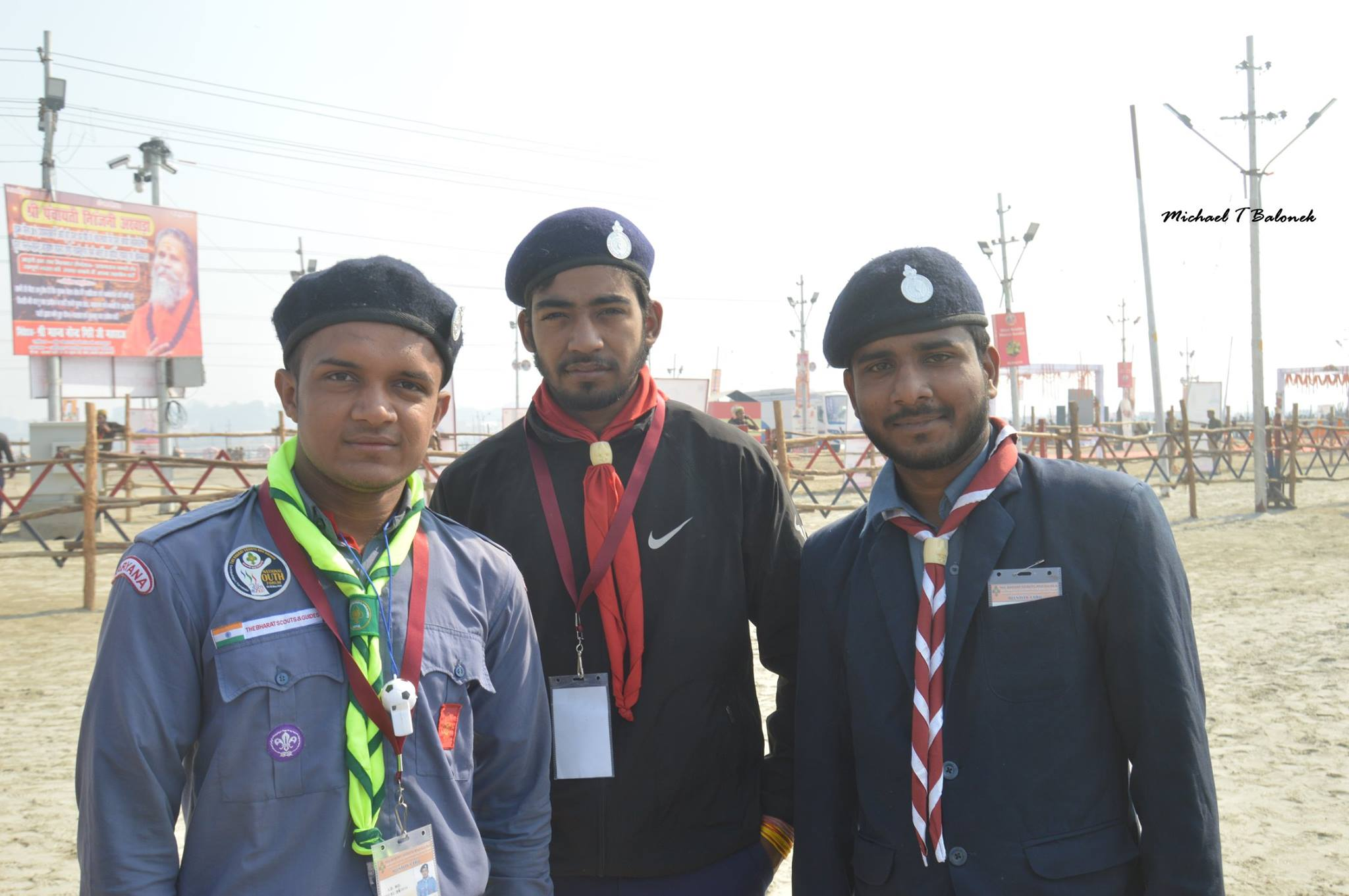
Scouts from India wearing neckerchiefs secured with woggles

The Scouting movement makes the neckerchief part of its uniform, where the neckerchiefs are secured by a neckerchief slide known in some areas as a "woggle." A utilitarian accessory in addition to being a decoration, the neckerchief may be used as a utility cloth for washing, wetting, absorbing sweat, and a triangular bandage for first aid.

The origin of the Scouting neckerchief seems to be in Robert Baden-Powell's 1896 participation in the Second Matabele War in then Southern Rhodesia, where he worked with Frederick Russell Burnham, an American-born scout employed by the British Army. Baden-Powell copied Burnham's practical style of dress, including "a grey-coloured handkerchief, loosely tied around the neck to prevent sunburn". When Baden-Powell launched the Scout Movement with the book Scouting for Boys in 1908, he prescribed a neckerchief or scarf as part of the Scout uniform, which he stated was:

"...very like the uniform worn by my men when I commanded the South African Constabulary... Every Troop has its own scarf colour, since the honour of your Troop is bound up in the scarf, you must be very careful to keep it tidy and clean."

Initially, Scout neckerchiefs were tied with a variety of knots, but the use of a "woggle", or slide, originated in the United States in the early 1920s and quickly spread around the Scouting world.

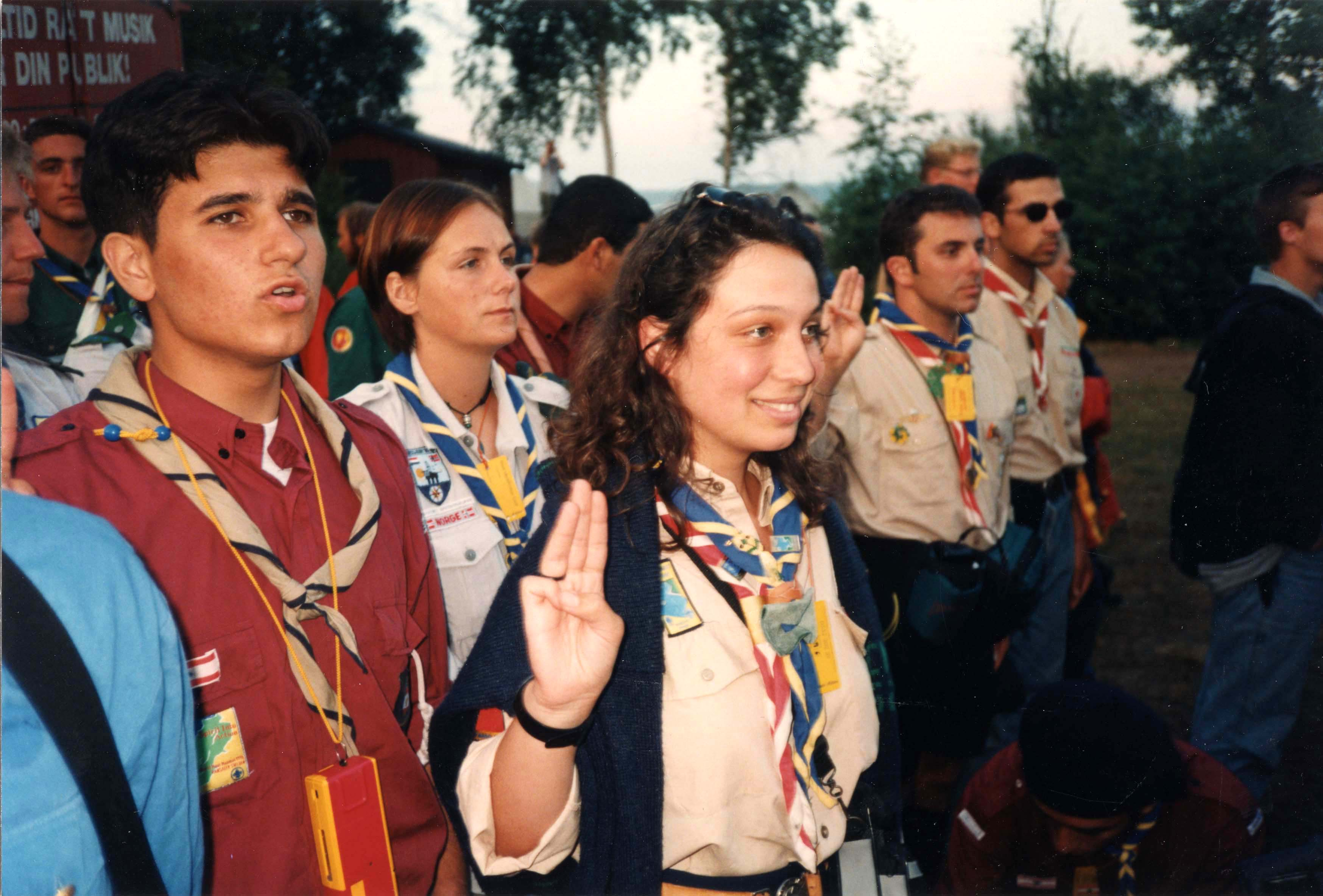
Scouts from many different countries wearing neckerchiefs at the World Scout Moot

Each Scout group would have a neckerchief of different design and colours. In most countries each Scout Troop uses its own colour neckerchief. The colours are usually the "Troop Colours" which may have a particular historical significance to the troop or to the local community.

At Scouting camps and jamborees these neckerchiefs represent units, subcamps or the camp as a whole. Scarves are also used as memorabilia at Scouting events and country scarves are often traded at international gatherings, such as the World Scout Jamboree.

In Canada, while most groups use colour neckerchiefs, there is also an optional alternate universal pattern tartan neckerchief: white plaid on red for Scouts, gold plaid on dark green for Cubs. Alternating thick and thin lines of the plaid spell out "CANADA" in Morse code.

In Australia, Queensland uses a single maroon necker for the whole state, while the other states allow groups, Venturer Units and Rover Crews to choose their own necker. Region and Branch Teams also have their own neckers.

In Hungary, as well as the Hungarian diaspora communities in countries such as the US, the necktie color is national rather than distinctive for each troop, being light blue for ages 10 and younger and grass green for ages 11 and up.

In other countries individual patrols are identifiable by their neckerchiefs and so troops may have many different neckerchiefs all at once. In both of these cases the neckerchief and its colours are an issue of identity, and become emblematic of a troop or a patrol.

Neckerchiefs can also have important ceremonial functions in Scouting, for example, the 1st Gilwell Scout Group present a special neckerchief on completion of the Wood Badge.

Some Traditional Scouting Associations use a square neckerchief folded over, as Scouts originally wore.

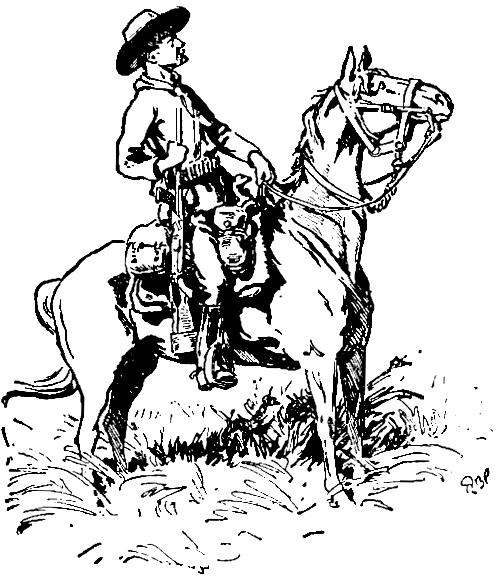
Baden-Powell's sketch of Burnham in 1896, wearing a neckerchief

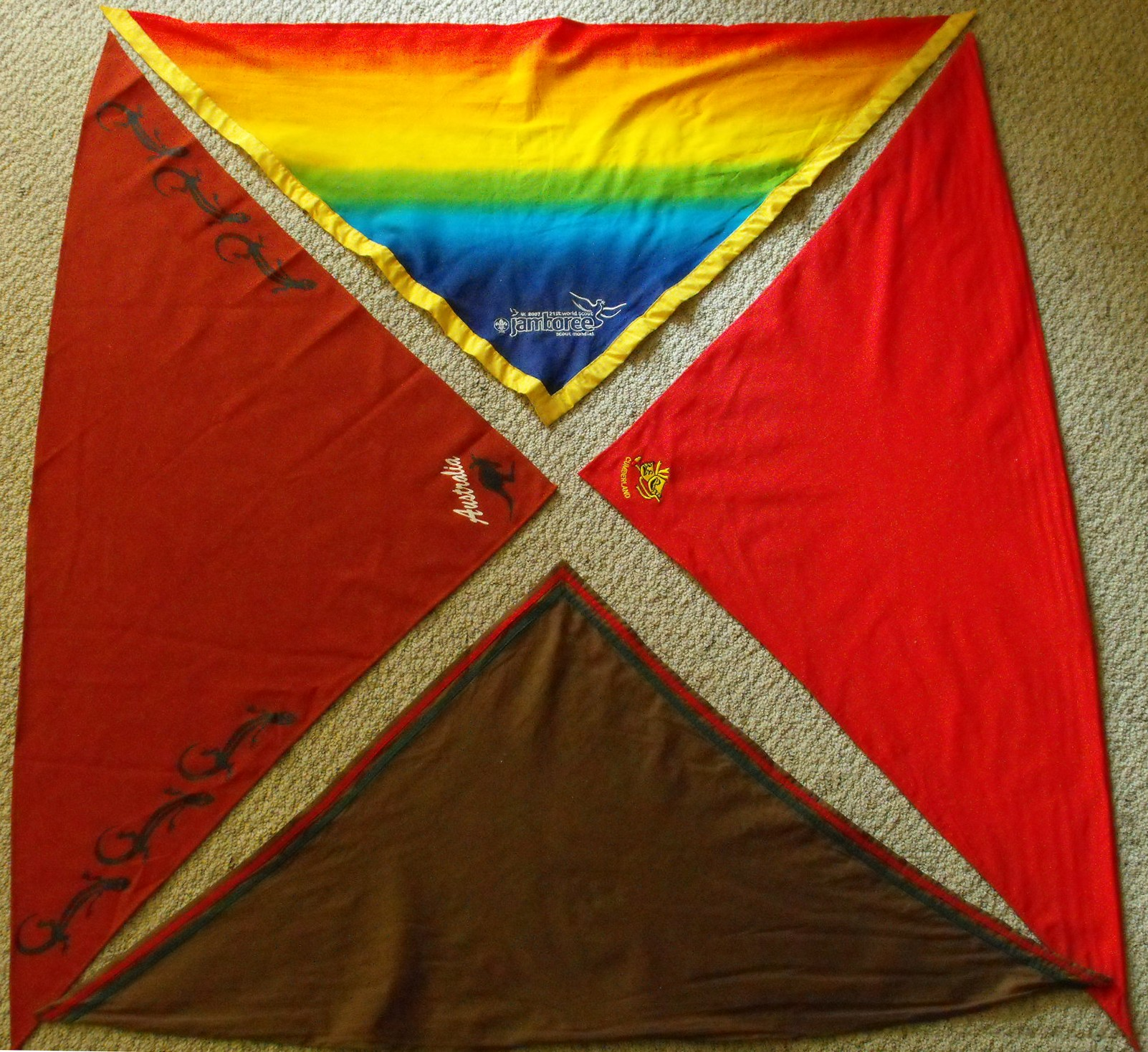
Four Scout scarves (clockwise from top) the 21st World Scout Jamboree scarf, a Gang Show scarf from Cumberland Gang Show, the troop and group scarf from 1st Cherrybrook Scout Group, and the national scarf for Australia

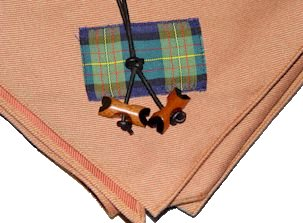
Gilwell Wood Badge neckerchief and beads

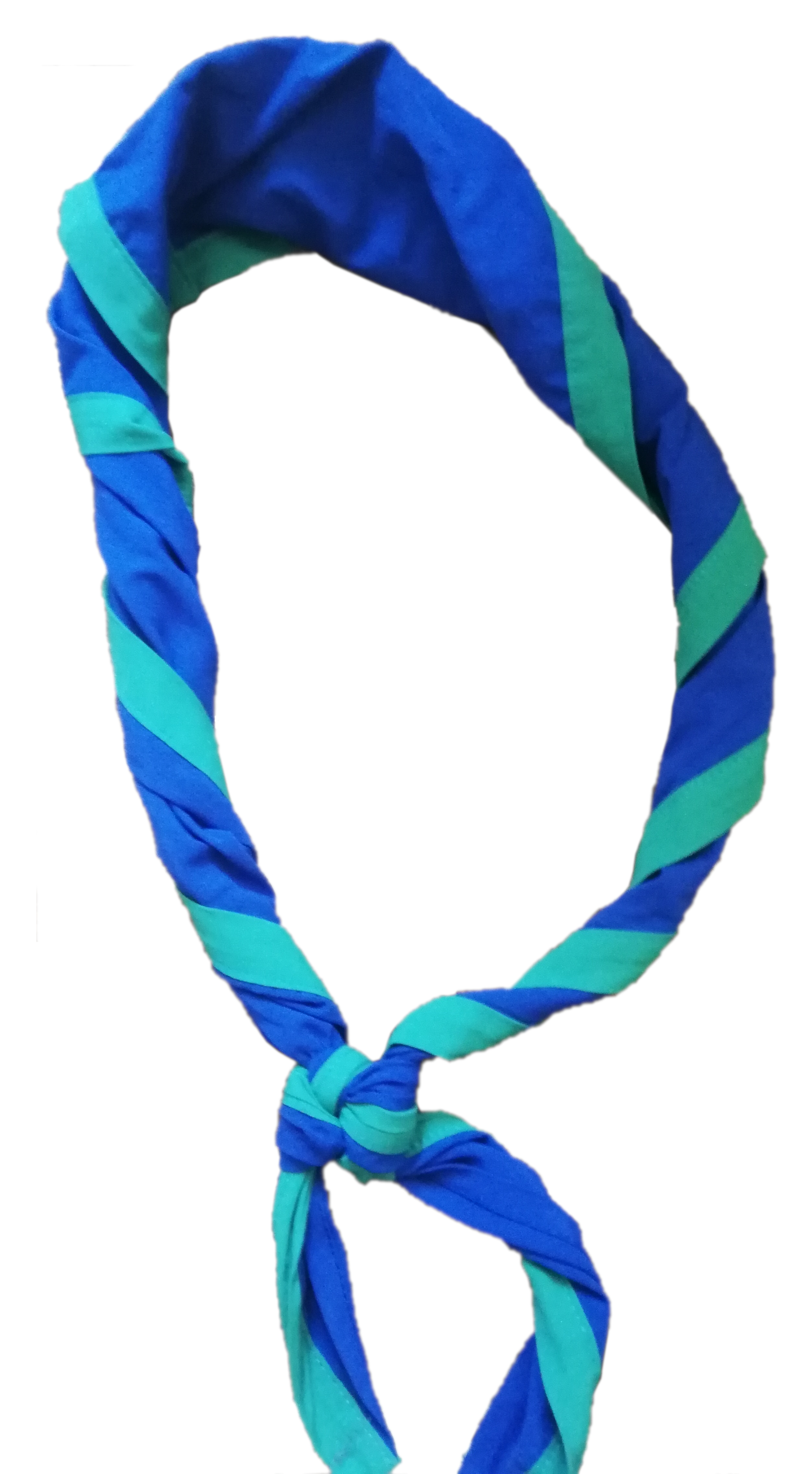
A double-colour neckerchief on use in Turkey

=== Political youth movements ===
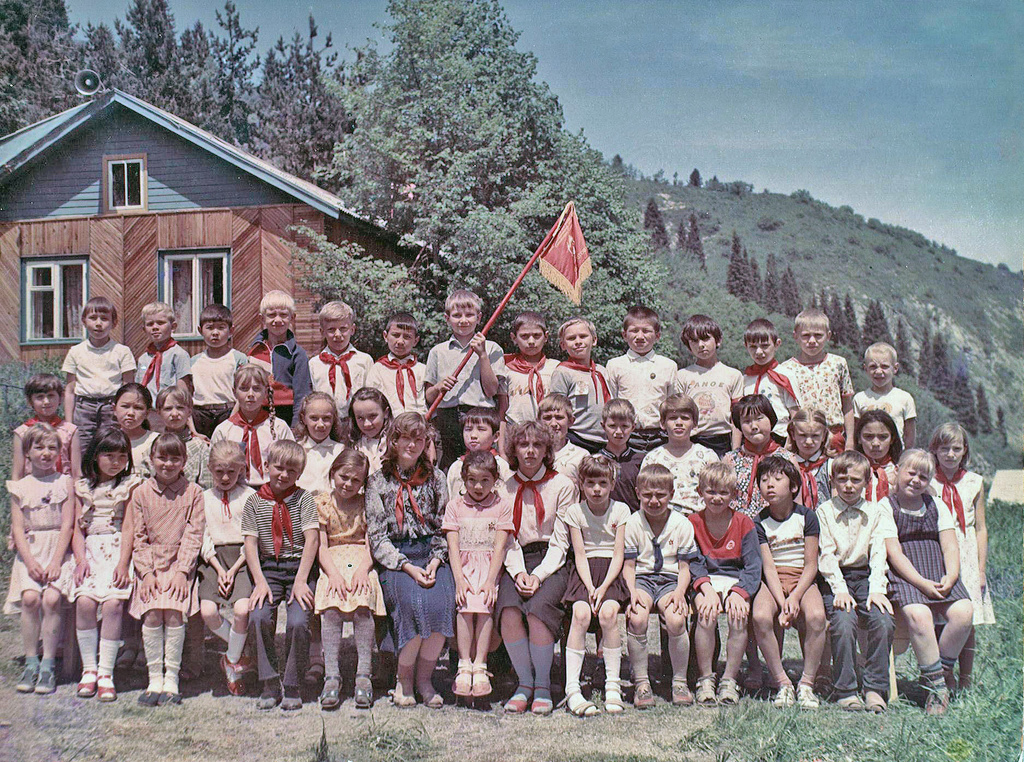
Young Pioneers in the former Kazakh SSR wearing red neckerchieves

In Nazi Germany, the Hitler Jugend, Deutsches Jungvolk and Bund Deutscher Mädel all wore a black neckerchief as part of their uniform, usually folded under the shirt collar. It has been suggested that it was copied from Scouting, which was banned in Germany in 1935.

In many Communist states, members of the Pioneer movement wore a red neckerchief, which was sometimes worn without the rest of the uniform. This continues at present in China, Vietnam, and North Korea.

== See also ==
- Ascot
- Bandanna
- Cravat
- Fichu
- Friendship knot
- Kerchief
- Neal Manufacturing Company
- Red scarf
- Scarf
- Scout Scarf Day
