= Woggle hopping =

Athletic training discipline

Originating in Yorkshire, in the 1940s, woggle hopping is the act of jumping over an object that is the same height, or higher than a woggle.

== Background ==
George Corner, a scoutmaster in West Yorkshire wanted his scouts to stay fit. He told the scouts they should be fit enough to jump over any item the height of their woggle. Corner would often demonstrate this point by jumping over pillar boxes.

== See also ==
- Leap frog
- Parkour
