= Neal Manufacturing Company =

- Industry: Neckerchief slide
- Founder: C. Millard Neal
- Headquarters: Biddeford, Maine, United States

The Neal Manufacturing Company was a neckerchief slide company based in Biddeford, Maine. It was founded by C. Millard Neal, proprietor of Neal's Novelty Shop.

== Background ==
Neal was a Unit and District Level Volunteer with the Pine Tree Council. The company made a large series of bakelite neckerchief slides. They also made many special event slides. Most slides were sold unpainted. Earlier slides have the word "NEAL" written on the neckerchief holder, while later ones say, "NEAL SLIDE", and "NEAL SLIDE ®". The "®" on the last style, the most prevalent, is actually a circled r stands for registered trademark. The period of their manufacture may also be indicated by the color of the resin used.

These were sold to summer camps and local councils, often sold at the trading post. The Scout Museum at the Pine Tree Council offices has a display on these nationally popular plastic slides. The slides featured every imaginable Scout image. Some came pre-painted but most scouts bought the plain ones and painted them themselves.

== Gallery ==
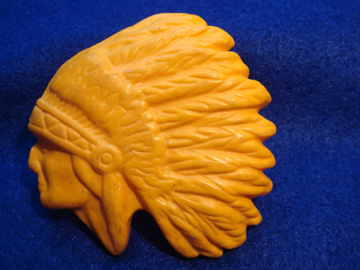
Indian head

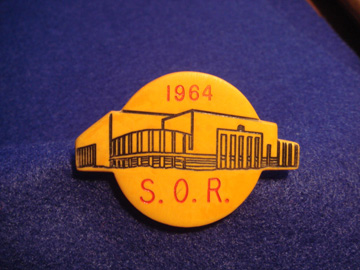
1964 scoutoree

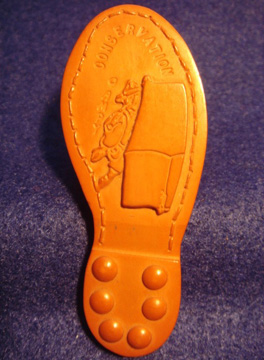
Conservation foot

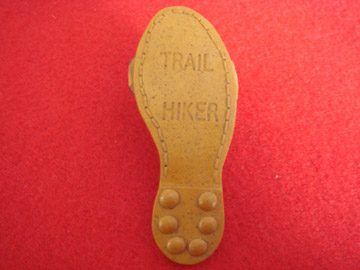
Trail Hiker

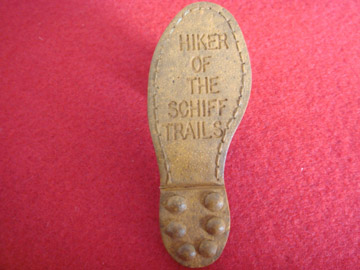
Hiker of the Schiff Trails

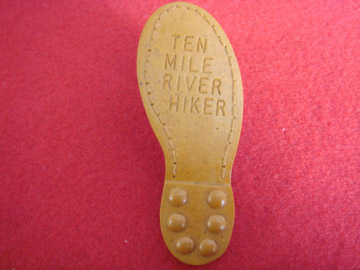
Ten Mile River

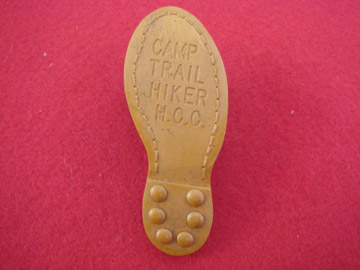
Camp Trail Hiker HCC
