= Scouting in Maine =

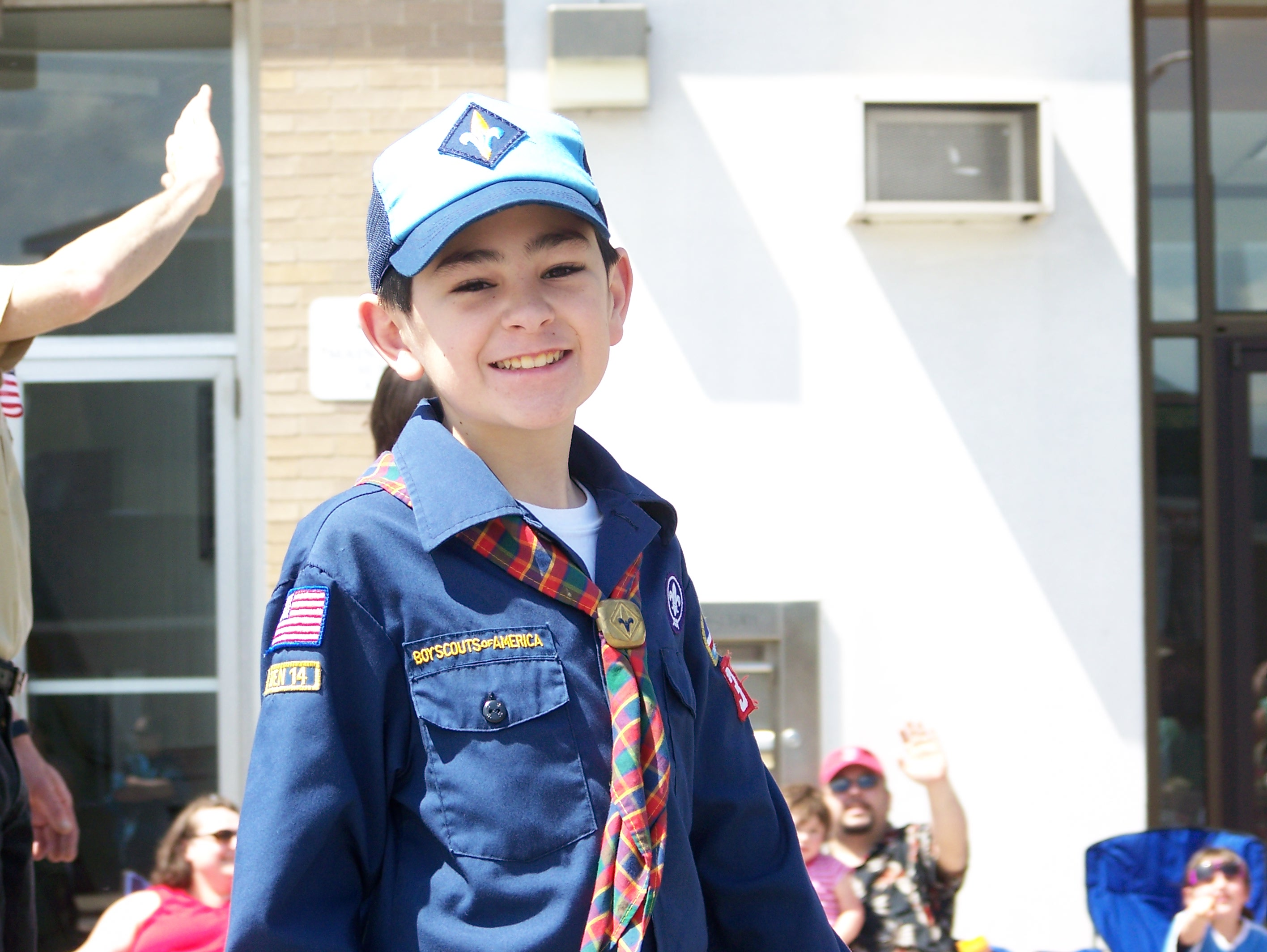
- Memorial Day parade in Springvale, Maine

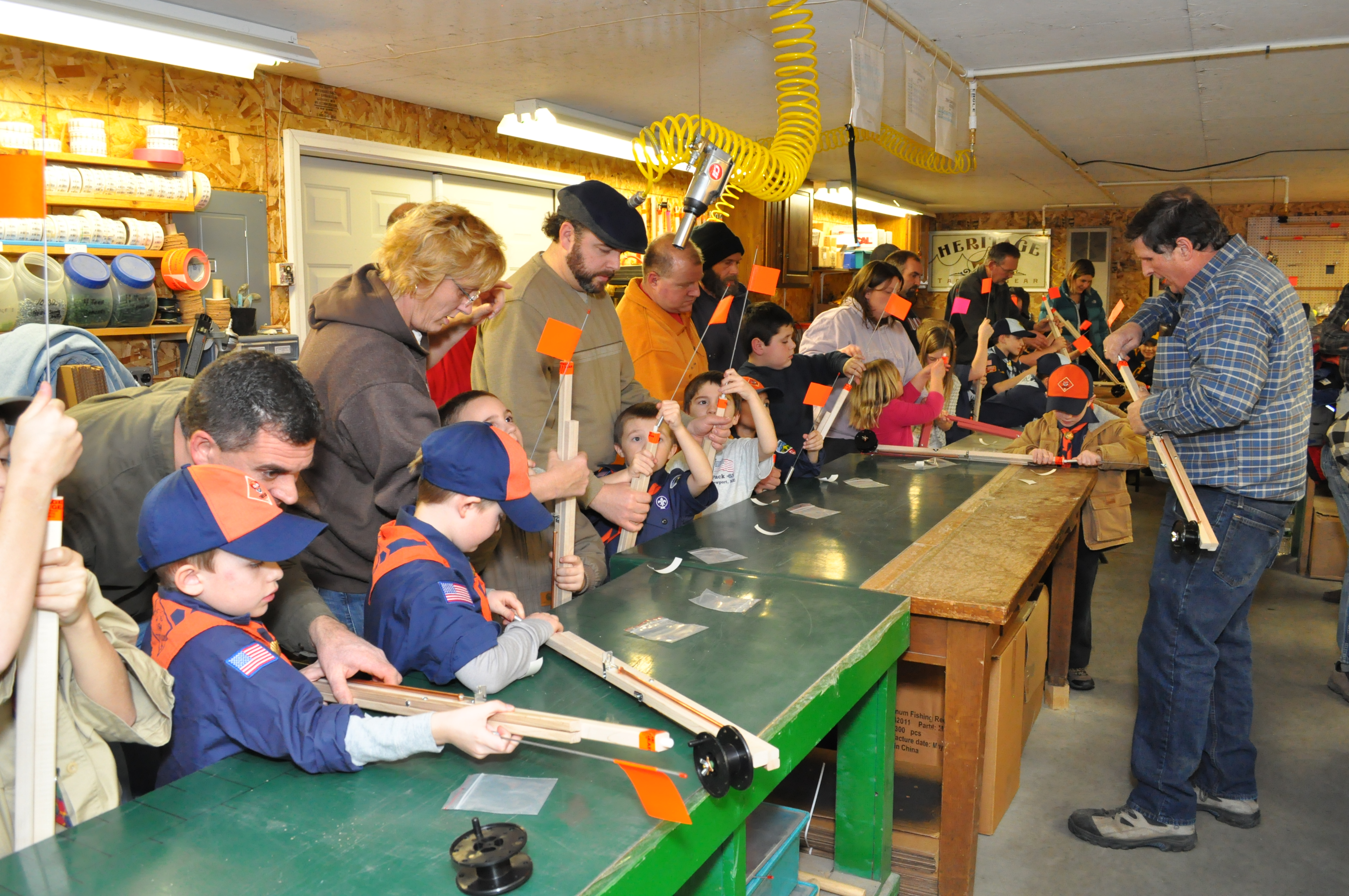
- Cub Scouts make ice fishing traps in Eddington

Scouting in Maine dates back to the creation of the Katahdin Area Council in 1920 and has continued prominently to the present day.

== Scouting America ==
=== History ===
Boy Scouting started early in Maine, with two local councils in operation by February 1915. The first second-class council was in operation by 1916, and by 1917, three second-class councils existed in Auburn, Bath, and Saco. South Portland Council began in 1918, as did Waterville Council, but that council apparently only existed for a year. Bangor, Old Town, and Portland Councils were started in 1919 in those localities, while in that same year, Auburn, Bath, and Saco's councils all ceased to exist. Old Town's council ceased to exist in 1920, while Oxford County Council (#219) was formed, with its headquarters in South Paris, Maine.

In 1921, South Portland Council ceased to exist, while a new one, Biddeford & Saco Council, blossomed once again in Saco. Bangor Council opened Camp Roosevelt, believed to be the first council camp in Maine, the same year. Portland Council changed its name to Cumberland County Council in 1922, no doubt reflecting its expansion beyond the city of Portland (Portland Council had probably absorbed South Portland Council's troops upon its demise the previous year). No organizational changes appeared in 1923, but big changes would happen the following year.

In 1924, the leaders of Bangor Council took a step similar to that taken by Portland Council in 1922; they changed the council's name to one more reflective of the region served—Penobscot Council—with the change effective at the New Year. Meanwhile, Scouting in the Saco area again took a downturn, with Biddeford & Saco Council ceasing to exist. Oxford County Council also ceased to exist in 1924.

In September 1925 organizers formed a council headquartered in Rockland—Pine Tree Council. Camden was added to this council in 1928, but then Pine Tree Council was absorbed into Cumberland County Council in 1929. The latter council had been growing quite nicely already, as it had added eight towns in Oxford County in May 1929. Also added in 1929 were units in Sagadahoc, Franklin, and Kennebec Counties and those in parts of Knox, Lincoln, and Somerset Counties. Five more towns in Knox County were added in 1930.

Organizers in Saco tried again in 1927, forming York County Council, which also included units in Biddeford and North Berwick. Units in Somersworth, New Hampshire joined York County Council in 1929, but that town moved to New Hampshire's Daniel Webster Council in 1932.

In 1929, Penobscot Council changed its name to Katahdin Area Council, possibly reflecting its growth to encompass all of northern Maine. Although there are references to the council being named "Katahdin Council" on Camp Roosevelt patches, it is generally believed that "Area" has been a part of the council name since its inception.

After two decades of growth and consolidation, by the BSA's twentieth anniversary in early 1930, there were just three councils in Maine—Katahdin Area Council, headquartered in Bangor; Cumberland County Council, headquartered in Portland; and York County Council, headquartered in Saco. The 1930s would see the final changes in council organization: at the end of 1932, Cumberland County Council changed its name to Pine Tree Council, and in 1935, York County Council merged into Pine Tree Council. That merger left Maine with the two councils present there today — Katahdin Area Council in Bangor and Pine Tree Council in Portland.

=== Katahdin Area Council ===
Katahdin Area Council (#216)
- Owner: Scouting America
- Headquarters: Eddington, ME
- Country: United States
- Founded: 1919
- President: Ken Jarivs
- Scout Executive: Charles Major
- Website katahdinareabsa.org

The Katahdin Area Council cites 1920 as its starting date, though the Bangor Council (#216) actually began operation in 1919. The Council changed its name to the Penobscot Council (#216), then in 1924 and to the Katahdin Area Council in 1929.

==== Organization ====
The council is broken down into four districts:

- Central Highlands
- North Star District
- Sunrise District
- Waldo District

==== Camps ====
===== Camp Roosevelt/Katahdin Scout Reservation =====
Katahdin Scout Reservation
- Owner: Katahdin Area Council
- Location: Eddington, Maine
- Country: United States
- Coordinates: 44.76863380°N 68.55345540°W
- Founded: 1921

Camp Roosevelt or KSR (Katahdin Scout Reservation) is Katahdin Area Council's resident Scouts BSA camp and has been in operation since 1921. The camp is in Eddington, Maine and has over 1,800 acres (730 ha) of pristine forest at the base of Black Cap Mountain that surround the 300 acres (120 ha) Fitts Pond.

The camp has 19 campsites and can handle about 500 campers at one time. One of the hallmarks of the camp is the log cabin-style Dining lodge - Pamola Lodge, which was built in 1929. It remains one of the largest free-standing log cabins in the country.

In 2001, the camp added a COPE program (Challenging Outdoor Personal Experience), which provides both high- and low-element activities and challenges for scouts over 14 years old.

The Peter Vigue Scout Center was completed in August 2006. It includes the Teddy Roosevelt Welcome Room and a Lodge/dining hall that seats 420 people. The prior lodge/dining hall was renamed the Pamola Lodge in 2009 and is now used for program activities to insulate and improve opportunities for packs, troops, and crews throughout the winter.

===== Maine High Adventure BSA =====
Maine High Adventure BSA, formerly Maine National High Adventure Area, is operated by the Katahdin Area Council and serves as a high adventure program for Scouts from throughout the country. Hundreds of Scouts and Ventures, enjoy a unique backcountry experience in northern Maine. The area encompasses nearly 3 million acres (12,000 km^{2}), including Mt. Katahdin, the Allagash Wilderness Waterway, the Penobscot River watershed (East and West branches), the St.Croix International Waterway, the northernmost 100 miles (160 km) of the Appalachian Trail, and many other streams and lakes. Much of the almost 10,000 square miles (26,000 km^{2}) open for exploration remain untouched - as travelers like Henry David Thoreau experienced it over 150 years ago.

Since 1970, Maine High Adventure has been providing customized, fully outfitted, guided trips for youth groups of all kinds. Participants have come from across the country and the world to experience the type of backcountry adventure that is becoming increasingly scarce each day. Maine High Adventure provides food, camping equipment, van transportation, and a fully trained "Matagamon guide."

==== Order of the Arrow ====
Pamola Lodge 211
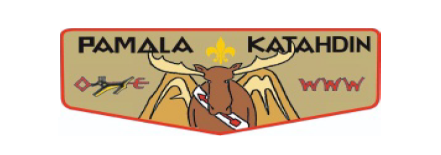
- Pamola Lodge Pocket Flap
- Totem: Running Moose
- Founded: 1941
- Lodge Chief: Devin Plant
- Lodge Adviser: Les Stackpole
- Staff Adviser: Scott Harvey

Pamola Lodge 211 is the Order of the Arrow lodge for Katahdin Area Council, serving northern and eastern Maine, and is part of the Northeast Region, Section NE-1. Pamola Lodge encompasses the largest geographical area of any lodge east of the Mississippi and is the most northern lodge in the continental United States. The Lodge was first chartered in 1941, although much of its early history is shrouded in mystery. In 1951 the lodge disbanded only to be rechartered again in 1955. Lodge activity continued to grow in the late 1950s and 1960s with the Lodge's first Vigil ceremony being held in 1961.

The Lodge's totem is the Running Moose, shown on the flap. It is named after the legendary Penobscot Indian Spirit of Mount Katahdin, Pamola. Pamola Lodge was one of the few lodges to retain its original flap for its entire history until 2007, when it was reinvented.

In 2006, Pamola Lodge received the National Service Award, which was established to recognize lodges in each region that have performed outstanding service, both qualitatively and quantitatively, to their council. In 2015, Pamola Lodge received the Section NE-1 Ordeal Ceremonies award.

=== Pine Tree Council ===
Pine Tree Council
- Owner: Scouting America
- Headquarters: Raymond, ME
- Country: United States
- Founded: 1919
- President: Jack O'Toole
- Council Commissioner: Mike L'Abbe
- Scout Executive: Matthew Klutzaritz
- Website pinetreebsa.org

The present-day Pine Tree Council (#218) can trace its beginnings to 1919 when organizers formed Portland Council (#218) in that city. South Portland Council was formed a year earlier but that council folded in 1921. In 1922, Portland Council became Cumberland County Council (#218), no doubt reflecting its growth outside of the city of Portland. Between 1922 and 1932 Cumberland County Council continued to grow, adding units in Oxford, Sagadahoc, Androscoggin, Franklin, Kennebec, Knox, Lincoln, and Somerset counties. The original Pine Tree Council (#710), formed in Rockland in 1925, merged into Cumberland County Council in 1929, and in 1933, Cumberland County Council became the Pine Tree Council we know today. York County Council (#217) merged into Pine Tree Council in 1935.

==== Background ====
Scouts from Maine have been active throughout the years and highly involved in the community.

In 1953, 39 Scouts traveled to the National Scout Jamboree led by Stanley McCurdy, Millard Neal, and Clyde Nason. They were known as special Troop 27.

==== Districts ====
The council contains four districts:

- Abnaki District
- Casco Bay District
- Kennebec Valley District
- York District

==== Camps ====
===== Camp Bomazeen =====
Camp Bomazeen is located on Great Pond in North Belgrade, Maine, where Screenwriter Ernest Thompson spent his summers as a youth on its shores. Thus, Great Pond inspired the screenplay "On Golden Pond". The Camp Bomazeen property was donated in 1944 by George G. and Francis M. Averill of Waterville and the camp was opened in 1946. For 57 years, the camp provided a long-term Boy Scout summer camp experience, adding specialty weeks in later years (Be First Class, wilderness survival, mountain man, Indian lore, drama, photography, bike treks, backpacking, environmental science, and art among others) along with Webelos camp programs.

In the summer of 2004, Pine Tree Council stopped using Camp Bomazeen as a Summer Camp. For the next 10 years, It was used as a day camp for Cub Scouts only. In 2014, Pine Tree Council re-opened the Camp to Boy Scouts, launching a brand new program using specialty themes. These themes were Maine Junior Woodsman Guide, Nechemis (the new scout program), Trades and Technology, and Bush Craft Adventure.

Today, Bomazeen, with campsites and cabins with wood stoves, provides year-round opportunities to packs, troops, crews, and ships. It is a site for district camporees and the venue for Trailblazer days for new Cubs and Parents just joining Scouting. Wood Badge training courses and Order of the Arrow ordeals are regularly held there.

Pine Tree Council is currently in a fundraising campaign to develop and improve its year-round facilities. Kennebec Valley District uses Camp Bomazeen for summer Cub day camp.

Camp Bomazeen is named for Chief Bomazeen (whose name translates as 'keeper of the ceremonial flames') of the Norridgewock tribe of the Wabenaki nation.

===== Camp Gustin =====
Located on Loon Pond, Sabattus, Maine, Camporees have been held on this council property since at least 1947. The camp has been a regular site for Abnaki district (surrounding Auburn, Lisbon, Lewiston, Norway, Paris, and Bethel in Androscoggin and Oxford Counties) events, including camporees, Cub events, and district Cub Day Camps. Although a favorite of Abnaki, many units from other parts of the Council have camped there, taken part in "Beaver" work days, and done service projects to improve campsites.

With open fields and wooded campsites for tenting, a clean water source and latrines, a pond, a pavilion, and backcountry roads in the area, Camp Gustin hosts troop shakedowns and junior leader training, design-your-own second-class rural hiking, troop challenges, Cub family camping, picnics, and field days, and for older Scout retreats.

The camp had been considered for sale to support other properties and/or relieve council debt, but in November 2010, Pine Tree Council announced its intention to keep the camp as a site for unit outdoor programs for Boy Scouts of all ages.

===== Camp William Hinds =====
Camp William Hinds
- Owner: Pine Tree Council
- Location: Raymond, Maine
- Country: United States
- Coordinates: 43.94934°N 70.46936°W
- Founded: 1927
- Website www.camphinds.org

Camp William Hinds opened in 1927 as the summer camp for Cumberland County Council. The camp was named after the businessman's son, who had donated the property to the council. The camp is located on 230 acres (0.93 km^{2}) of land on Panther Pond in Raymond, Maine, and is currently the only long-term Pine Tree Council camp supporting troops and packs in southern Maine.

Scouts use Camp Hinds for an entire week-long summer program of aquatics, nature/ecology, Scoutcraft (outdoor skills), archery and riflery, handicraft, ropes course, and climbing. The Ring Dining Hall is a place for family-style dining and mealtime programs. The summer camp also has campfire programs. Week-long winter programs during Maine school vacations and winter camping programs based in the Rotary Training Center are popular. Troops and packs use the facilities at summer camp and unit-based programs in spring, fall, and winter.

The camp has 14 large, wooded campsites and three cabins available through Pine Tree Council throughout the year. Summer camp programs include 7 Scouts BSA weeks and 2 4-day, 3-night Webelos camping sessions. Summer Fun Pack Weekends are designed for Cub Scout Packs and their families.

The camp has been extensively used throughout the years. In 1954, the camp hosted an adult leader training for 2,00 volunteers in the area.

The Trading Post once sold many Neal Manufacturing Company slides, manufactured by C. Millard Neal, a volunteer in the Pine Tree Council. The Scout Museum at the Pine Tree Council offices has a display on these nationally popular plastic slides. The slides featured every imaginable Scout image. Some came pre-painted, but most scouts bought the plain ones and painted them themselves.

===== Camp Nutter =====
Camp William Nutter, located on Loon Pond in Acton, Maine, was originally the summer camp for York County Council. When that council merged with Pine Tree Council in 1935, it was initially not used as a summer camp; however, sometime after 1944, the council opened it as a summer camp. It operated as such into the 1950s. The earliest dated patch is 1949. The council still owns the property, but it is only used by the York District for weekend events & Cub Scout Day Camp.

==== Order of the Arrow ====
Madockawanda Lodge 271 is the Order of the Arrow Lodge for the Pine Tree Council, serving scouts in central and southern Maine. It is a part of the Section E-19 of the Eastern Region. Madockawanda Lodge has continuously operated since its founding in 1944 at Camp Hinds. Frank W.P. Bailey, a long-time staff member of Camp Hinds, founded Madockawanda Lodge. Bailey gave the name Madockawanda, after the story of the great Indian Chief Madockawanda who unified the Penobscot Nation. The Lodge totem is the snapping turtle.

In the early years, chapters of the Lodge were located at the council's summer camp facilities (Hinds, Bomazeen). Camp Nutter was the summer camp of the former York County Council. They had adopted a different honor society, the "Nikiwigi", and a period of negotiation was required before Camp Nutter OA chapter replaced the Nikiwigi tribe there. The chapter was active for only a few years before summer camp operations ceased at Nutter, and the chapter disbanded.

As the elections moved from summer camp to units, camp-based chapters coexisted, with chapters divided along the lines of the council's districts. Each camp chapter had a Lodge Vice Chief who supervised the districts closest to his camp.

The Lodge inducted its first Vigil Honor member (& the first Vigil Honor member in any Maine Council) in 1952 when founder Frank W.P. Bailey was inducted and given the name Sirus. The Lodge continued the tradition of star and constellation-based Vigil names until 1971.

Four members of Madockawanda have received the National Distinguished Service Award, and numerous youth and adults have served as Section officers and advisers. In 2000, Madockawanda Lodge was one of eight Lodges to receive the first National Service Award. It also earned the award in 2006, 2008 and 2009. It holds the record for the most National Service Awards awarded to a single lodge in the Northeast Region. Madockawanda has received quality lodge recognition for 14 years since 1991.

== Girl Scouts of the USA ==
=== Girl Scouts of Maine ===
Girl Scouts of Maine
- Map of Girl Scout Councils in Maine
- Headquarters: South Portland, Maine
- Country: United States
- Website girlscoutsofmaine.org

The sole Maine Girl Scout council, Girl Scouts of Maine, was formed in October 2007 by merging the Abnaki Girl Scout Council and Girl Scouts of Kennebec Council. It serves over 14,000 girls, has about 4,000 adult volunteers, and is headquartered in South Portland, Maine.

==== History ====
The first known active troop in Maine was in 1912 in Portland. Abnaki Girl Scout Council was established in northern Maine in 1962 from Bangor-Brewer, Central Penobscot, Presque Isle, and Houlton councils and many lone troops. Girl Scouts of Kennebec Council was established in 1963 from 11 southern Maine councils and, again, many lone troops.

==== Organization ====
Service Centers:

- Bangor, Maine
- Presque Isle, Maine
- South Portland, Maine

==== Camps ====
- Kirkwold is in Readfield
- Natarswi is in Baxter State Park near Millinocket
- Pondicherry is 700 acres (2.8 km^{2}) in the White Mountains near Bridgton
- Scelkit is 5 acres (20,000 m^{2}) on Gerrish Island, Kittery Point

== See also ==
- Neal Manufacturing Company
- Scouting in New Brunswick
- Scouting in Québec
- Scouting in New Hampshire
