= Cub Scouts (The Scout Association) =

UK children's organization

- Cub Scout section logo
- Owner: The Scout Association
- Age range: 8-10½
- Country: United Kingdom
- Founded: 1916
- Membership: 142,273 (January 2023)
Previous; Beaver Scouts	Next; Scouts; Sea Scouts; Air Scouts

Cub Scouts, often shortened to Cubs, are a section of Scouting operated by The Scout Association with a core age of eight to ten and a half years of age. This section follows on from the Beaver Scouts (6–8 year olds) and precedes the Scout section (10½–14 year olds).

Originally beginning in 1916 as Wolf Cubs, the section gained its current name in 1966 as a result of the Advance Party Report. Because of this early name, the section has themed links to wolves and the novel The Jungle Book with the section being called a Cub Pack and the volunteer leaders taking their names from this story.

Cub Scouts has been open to both boys and girls since 1991 as well as those of different faiths and none. Cub Scouts wear a green sweatshirt for their uniform and earn badges for skills learned and challenges overcome.

== History ==
=== Wolf Cubs: 1916-1966 ===
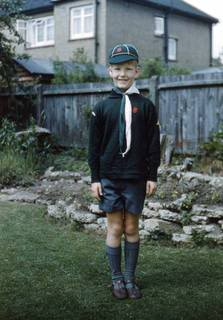
An example of a Wolf Cub uniform c.1960.

The Cub Scout section was first launched in 1916 as Wolf Cubs. Early in the development of the Scouting movement, there was a need for provision for those too young to join the Boy Scouts at the age of 11. In a number of cases, those too young were not turned away and unofficial junior troops existed in the UK as early as 1909, only a year after the official formation of troops. These boys were often taught simple Scout skills such as tracking, First Aid, simple knots or semaphore and wore a simple uniform of a green cap and dark green or blue jersey.

These early programmes, being a watered down version of full Scouting, was seen as unacceptable to Chief Scout, Robert Baden-Powell, and a draft scheme for younger boys was drawn up in 1913 and published in the Headquarters Gazette in January 1914 in an article called 'Wolf Cubs or Young Scouts - How to train them.' The outbreak of World War I in August 1914 led to older Scouts and Scoutmasters joining the army which brought new people into these roles including women leaders and more demand for a younger section and helped demonstrate the benefit of a younger section. The section became more widespread with the first Cub Conference on 24 June 1916 and the publication of the first Wolf Cubs Handbook on 29 November 1916, authored by Baden-Powell and influenced by Vera Barclay an influential figure at the beginning of the section being one of the first Cubmasters and writer or many publications and articles to help lead the section. The Wolf Cubs were officially launched at Caxton Hall in central London on 16 December 1916 and this is today considered the section's birthday.

The structure for the section revolved around Wolves and the Rudyard Kipling novel The Jungle Book. The name Wolf Cubs was chosen by Baden-Powell as 'wolf' was a Native American name for a good scout and a pack of wolves was the family of the boy Mowgli from the stories in The Jungle Book. Baden-Powell saw the story as a useful way to introduce the boys to Scouting in a fun and entertaining way, hoping that the boys would be inspired by the adventure and the teamwork of the pack, whereas Kipling (who was a neighbour of Baden-Powell for a time) focused his stories on Mowgli as a unique individual who would lead the pack. Leaders were known by the names of the main characters that taught lessons to Mowgli and the other animals of the jungle and each meeting was to start and finish with the "Grand Howl", a ceremony in which the Cubs greeted Akela, the Pack's leader. Some of the phrases used in this ceremony, Do Your Best and Do Our Best, would go on to be shortened to 'dyb' and 'dob' and used three times in the pack. Different to the Scout sign and salute which used three fingers, the Wolf Cub salute used two fingers to symbolise the ears of a wolf.

The uniform for the section settled very early on to a green cap with yellow piping and a green jersey. Similar to the older Scout section, Wolf Cubs also earned badges for achievement of a skill and at launch there were originally 12: artist, athlete, collector, first aider, guide, house orderly, observer, signaller, swimmer, team player, weaver and woodworker. Higher achievement was marked through the achievement of a One Star test and a Two Star test which required the boys to complete a variety of different skills and were recognised by the appropriate number of starts in their cap. The achievement of the pack was marked by attaching ribbons with the Cubs name and badge on it to a large wolf's head on a pole which was used for ceremonies and displayed during the meetings.

Early notable events that Wolf Cubs were involved in included a Posse of Welcome on 7 October 1922 welcoming the Prince of Wales returning from a tour of the Empire and a Wolf Cubs Day at the Imperial Jamboree on 6 August 1924 which was attended by Rudyard Kipling and The Duke of York. In addition to Vera Barclay, who had helped shape the section at the very start of its existence, two other individuals became well known at this time for developing the section. Dorothy Hughes became well known in the East of London running various Cub packs, buying a Scout Hall for her group and contributing funds for an indoor accommodation centre for Wolf Cubs at Gilwell Park which would go on to be named the Dorothy Hughes Pack Holiday Centre in her honour. Betty Melville Smith grew up in Hong Kong running Cub packs there in 1925 before being involved with Cub packs in Birmingham when she returned to Britain including a group for evacuees in the Second World War before being appointed as HQ Wolf Cubs Secretary after the war. She delivered Cub Leader training at Gilwell Park until 1969 and one of the kit stores was named 'Rikki's Store' after her nickname.

=== Cub Scouts and Arrows: 1966-1990 ===
1966 was an eventful year for the section, being the 50th anniversary of the Wolf Cubs and included large Pack Meetings and a musical pageant at the Royal Albert Hall in June. Local activities including collecting silver paper for the Guide Dogs for the Blind Association, sending birthday cards to overseas cub packs and making scrap books of their life.

That same year, as part of a scheme to modernize the whole movement in the United Kingdom, The Chief Scout's Advance Party Report recommended that the Cub section adopt a number of changes to align it to the rest of the movement. The section would now use the same salute as the rest of the association and a similar Promise. The name was to change from "Wolf Cubs" to Cub Scouts and while The Jungle Book theme would be retained, less emphasis would be placed upon it especially for older Cubs. The uniform would remain of green jersey and cap with grey shorts and long socks. A new progressive training scheme of Bronze, Silver and Gold Arrow awards was devised (one for each year in the pack) and badges and designs were updated with a common theme of red proficiency badges for the section. The proposals referring to the Cub Scouts were accepted and implemented in full the following year.

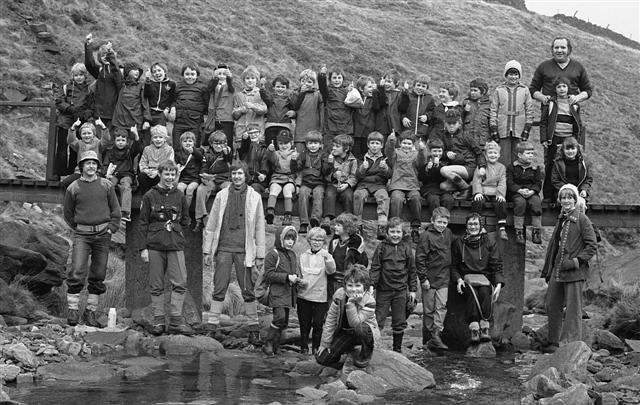
Meltham Cub Scouts on a trip in the Peak District during the late 1970s

Around a decade after the report in 1978 a major review of the Arrow Scheme was carried out. It was deemed that the choice of activities was too narrow for the Cub Scouts so the scheme was expanded dramatically. One hundred different activities were put into four different areas (Discovering, Growing Up, Sharing and Thinking) with Cubs having to pick three different activities from each of the four areas for each arrow award meaning that Cubs completed 36 activities during their full time in the section. The developed arrow activities were meant to be chosen by the Cub themselves, so they would have some personal choice in what they did, and had the benefit of not holding a Cub back if they missed a week when a compulsory activity was run - instead they would have been able to pick up another activity in the same area a few weeks later. It was also meant to benefit packs with a poor Cub/Leader ratio as one activity could be run for all ages of the pack and would be able to tick off activities for any level of award as the three awards shared a common activity list.

However a number of flaws emerged through the use of the updated Arrow scheme. When run properly, with the Cub Scouts choosing their activities, it was described even by the Scout Association later as an "organisational nightmare". It was easy for a Cub to lag behind in one section and extra time was often needed for Cubs to work on their particular activities. It was also possible for a Cub to choose an easy route through each award, missing out the more challenging activities and classic Scouting skills that made it very difficult for the leaders in the Scout troop to run their programme when Cubs moving up were not well versed in these skills. It was much less structured and the assessment for each award became subjective for the leader as the level of mastery required between bronze, silver and gold awards were very different. Subsequently, Cub leaders, and occasionally entire districts, tried to make sense of the awards by imposing their own structure and variations and choosing the activities on behalf of the Cubs.

These changes also saw the introduction of the round collective badges for activities such as camping, exploring and entertainment that same year. In 1986 Cub Scouts ceased to be the youngest section with the formal addition of Beaver Scouts on 1 April for young people aged 6–8 years of age.

=== Challenge and Adventure scheme: 1990-2002 ===
The Cub Scout Progressive Training Awards used from 1990 to 2003

Another wider scale refresh of the programme came in the early 1990s. In February 1990, it was decided in principle that the Association would become fully co-educational, leading to individual Scout Groups being able to decide to accept girls into Cubs and the other sections. This was formally allowed from July 1991 when the Scout Association's Royal Charter was amended. As of January 2020, the number of Cub Scouts in the UK was 157,172 of which 122,714 were recorded as male and 34,085 were recorded as female meaning at present 21.7% of the section are female.

That same year the Cub programme faced a number of changes to replace the much disliked Arrow awards. The changes, announced in September 1990 and officially launched from February 1991, saw new Cub Scout Award, Adventure Award and Adventure Crest Award replace the three arrow awards. The new awards were more structured and had less choice with the requirements split into ten sections with different numbers of activities from each section and more activities being made compulsory. Additionally a Cub Scout challenge was introduced for older Cubs that allowed them to try out the more adventurous activities in the Scout section and thus encouraging more Cubs to move up to the troop. The proficiency badges were renamed to activity badges and more were introduced bringing the total to 40 with some having different stages.

In the Scout-wide refresh that took place in 1995 some small changes were made to the badges of Cubs with the number of badges needed to be achieved for each challenge award reduced and one more activity badge being introduced - Road Safety, which proved popular as an easily achieved badge and was given a Prince Michael International Road Safety Award for contributions to road safety in 1995.

=== Relaunch: 2002-2015 ===
The first years of the 21st century saw a number of changes for the Cub Scout section in line with the other sections of the association. In May 2000 The Programme Review final report was produced after consultation that had been undergoing since 1995 with members of the Scouts and focus groups and led to a revamp of the programme in February 2002. One year before, in London Fashion Week 2001, new uniforms were unveiled for the section which saw a new design dark green activity jumper, navy blue activity trousers and a wider range of optional accessories such as a branded baseball cap and polo shirts. A logo was introduced along with all publications for the section being relaunched to reflect the new programme and wider Scout Association brand and visual identity.

The previous set of badges was discontinued and replaced with a set of five challenge awards (outdoor, fitness, creative, global and caring) covering the seven new programme zones. The top award for the section, the Chief Scout's Silver Award, was achieved for completion of the Outdoor challenge, two of the other challenges and a personal challenge. The activity badges were redesigned from red triangular badges to circular red badges with a yellow borders and the number was reduced to 32. Cub Scouts also benefited from the introduction of Staged Activity Badges and the Group Awards (later renamed Partnership Awards) in 2002 which were available to all sections under 18 years. The Group awards were a series of three (International friendship, Environment and Faith) that encouraged multiple sections within a group to work together or to work with outside organisations to complete a project or activity. The Staged Activity Badges mirrored the new activity badges in each section but consisted of stages (5 initially) that members could achieve at any age and often included skills that were developed over time. Upon their launch there were four focusing on Information Technology, Musician, Swimming and Nights Away (with the five stages recognising one, five, 10, 20 and 50 cumulative nights away from home respectively) before gaining badges in Emergency Aid and Hikes Away in October 2006 (with the Nights and Hikes away changing from 5 stages to more frequent stages numbered to directly reflect the number required).

In 2008, the Scout Association re-launched the programme zones so that there were now six zones with common themes for all four under 18 sections. As part of this, the Challenge awards for the section were entirely re-written and replaced with six challenge awards that aligned with the six new zones: Promise, Friendship, Fitness, Creative, Global and Outdoor challenges. The Chief Scout's Silver Award was also altered to make achievement of the award as simple as achieving all six challenge awards.

In 2014, the Scouting for All strategic plan for the next four years was launched that included an increased focus of community impact, youth voice and inclusion in the programme and which emerged from youth feedback. Off the back of this, a refresh of the programme was scheduled for 2015 and in April 2014, the Scout Association released four new activity badges and one new staged activity badge which were to be added as part of the refresh.

=== Skills for life: 2015-present ===
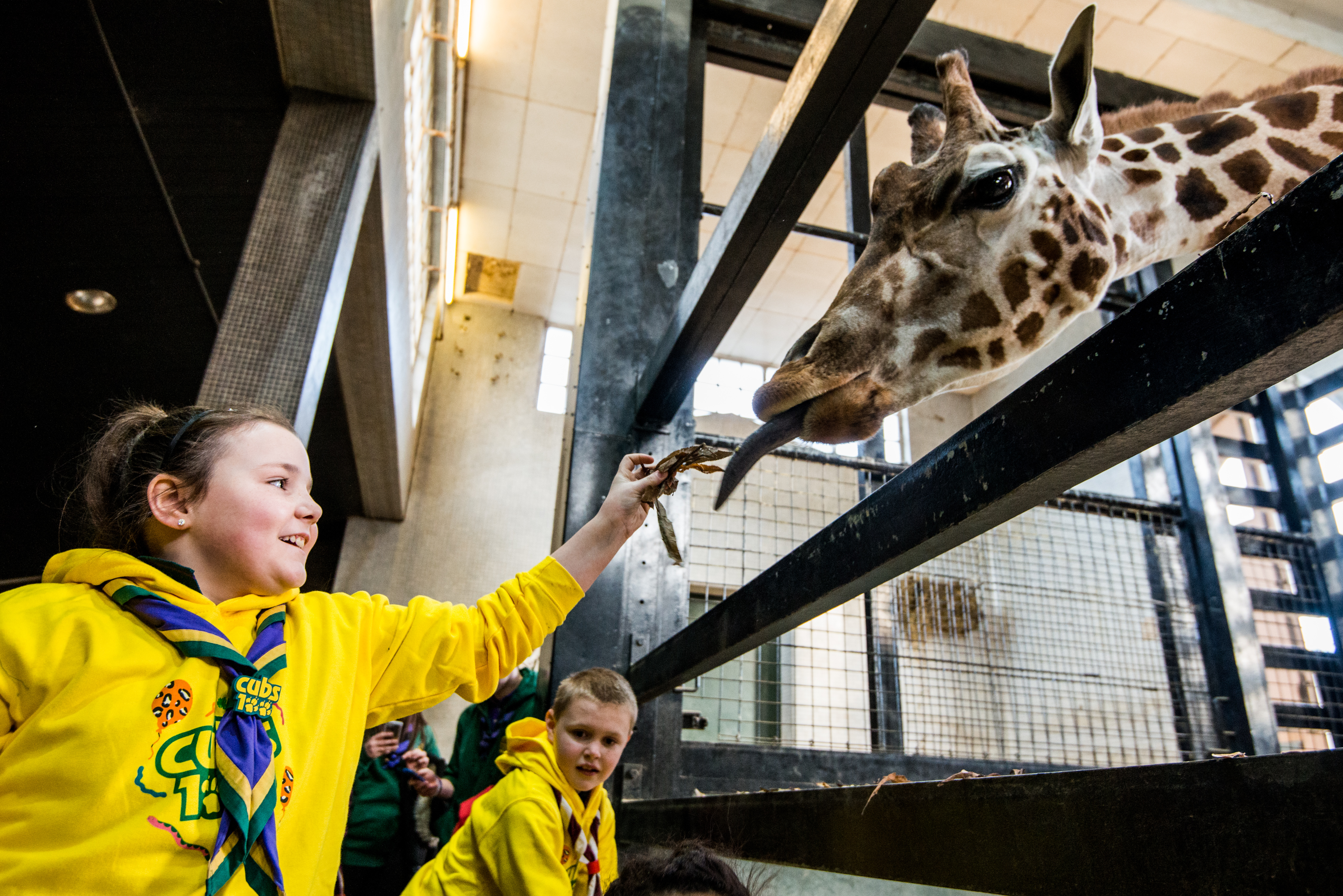
Cubs at London Zoo as part of 100th anniversary celebration of the Cub Scouts in 2016.

In January 2015, the Cub Scout programme received a refresh along with the programmes of all other sections and saw a renewed emphasis on outdoor activities, skills and world activities and the dropping of programme zones and partnership awards. Subsequently, the six challenge awards were replaced with seven new hexagonal Challenge awards: Our Adventure, Our Outdoors, Our Skills, Our World, Teamwork, Team Leader and Personal Challenges. There were a few changes to activity badges but the number of Staged activity badges were expanded greatly: the Information Technology badge was discontinued and replaced by a Digital Citizen (using technology) and Digital Maker (coding and uses of technology) badge; a new Air Activities staged badge for aeronautical skills and to link in with Air Scouts was launched; new Nautical skills, Paddle sports and Sailing staged badges to link with water activities and Sea Scouts were launched; a Navigator staged badge was launched to develop map-reading and navigating skills and a Community Impact staged activity badge was launched linking into the Scout's focus on community action and the A Million Hands partnership with charities.

In 2016, the Cub Scouts celebrated their 100th anniversary with a launch event at London Zoo, adventure camps throughout the UK to encourage Cubs to try new adventurous activities including CubJam, locally organised thanks events to thank those who have been involved with Cub Scouts in the past and culminated with a Promise Party on 16 December 2016 at 19:16 to commemorate the official registration date of the section. The theme was 'The Wildest Birthday Ever!' and included a special yellow necker design with nature patterns and a badge designed by Amber Pheasant, a Cub Scout from Nottingham. Other events included an event in the Houses of Parliament on 13 December 2016 and a visit to a pack in Kings Lynn by Catherine, Duchess of Cambridge on 14 December 2016.

In January 2018 the latest activity badge was added with the Gardener badge. In May 2018 the Scouts published their Skills for Life plan to 2023 which included improved tools for leaders, a refresh in the wider Scout visual identity and a promise to review uniforms.

== Organisation ==
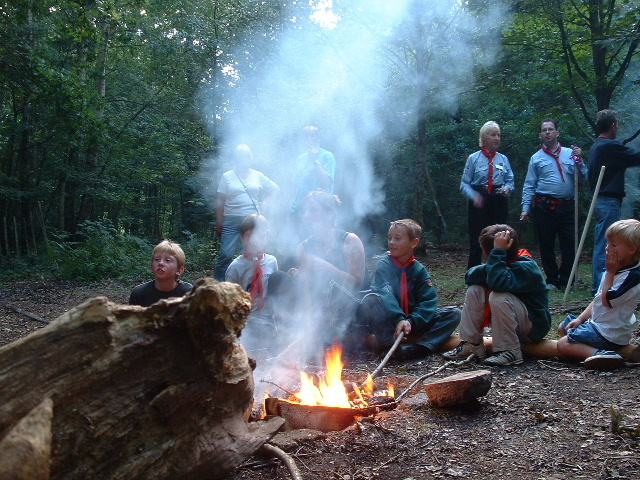
Cub Scouts around a fire at Furzefield Scout Campsite in West Sussex.

The Cub Scout section is run locally within a Scout group along with the younger Beaver Scout and Squirrel Scout sections and the older Scout section. Linking to the heritage of the section as the Wolf Cubs and with the theming of the early section based around The Jungle Book, the section is collectively called a Cub Pack which may contain up to around 36 Cub Scouts who often meet weekly. Cub packs are run by a volunteer adult leadership team, led by a Section Team Leader, and made up of Section Team Members who share the same level of training as the Section Team Leader, Young Leaders, 14-18 year olds who volunteer in the section, and occasional helpers who may be parents assisting as part of a rota. It is traditional for leaders in the section to be known by a name from The Jungle Book with Akela as leader of the wolves usually being taken by the Section Team Leader while Baloo, Bagheera, Kaa, Raksha, Chil, Hathi and Rama are popular names for other adult and young leaders.

It is usual for a Cub Scout pack to divide the Cubs into smaller peer groups, called Sixes (for the ideal number of Cubs in each group) and are led by a Sixer who is chosen from each six to lead the group. They may be supported by a deputy, called a Seconder, and a further role of Senior Sixer is available to older Cubs who helps the leaders and the Sixes.

The core age range for Cub Scouts is between eight and ten and a half years of age although members can join from 7½ years of age and remain until their 11th birthday. These age ranges can be flexed further if required for inclusion requirements.

The activities undertaken by Cub Scouts are collectively called the 'programme' and include activities, games, visits and residential experiences. The badges and awards achieved by the young people help support this programme and was initially divided into themed areas. With the re-launch of every section's programme in 2002, the programme was organised into seven zones: outdoor Scouting, fitness, discovering the world around you, creative, beliefs and attitudes, caring and community and global. In 2008 the zones were updated again into six zones with themes common to all under-18 sections in Scouting: beliefs & attitudes, community, fitness, creative, global and outdoor & adventure. In 2015, the concept of zones was dropped across the movement with the focus now being on three core areas of outdoor & adventure, world and skills with outdoor & adventure making up half of time spent on the programme.

== Membership ==
Cub Scouts is the biggest section run by the Scout Association.

Membership of the Cub Scout section.
Year	Members	Number of Cub Scout Packs
2008-09	140,621	7,790
2009-10	142,904	7,791
2010-11	144,296	7,900
2011-12	147,983	7,931
2012-13	150,825	7,987
2013-14	153,375	8,092
2014-15	151,865	-
2015-16	156,016	-
2016-17	157,994	-
2017-18	158,722	8,108
2018-19	157,119	8,120
2019-20	157,172	8,129
2020-21	122,169	8,159
2021-22	137,806	7,921
2022-23	142,273	7,777
2023-24	141,919	7,495
2024-25	138,892	7,449

=== Promise ===
In common with other sections in Scouting, Cub Scouts make a promise when they start in the section at a ceremony called being invested. The Cub Scout promise is very similar to the Scout promise with a few words simplified and making reference to a Cub Scout law. The core promise long associated with the section, and the promise still used for Christians, Jews and Sikhs is:

I promise that I will do my best,
to do my duty to God and to the King,
to help other people
and to keep the Cub Scout Law.

Muslims use a wording of the promise similar to that above but with the word God replaced with Allah while Buddhists and Hindus replacing the word God with my Dharma. A promise for those of no faith was introduced in January 2014 and substitutes the phrase 'Duty to God' in the promise above for 'To uphold our Scout values'. For subjects of independent Commonwealth countries, foreign nationals and individuals who are stateless the phrase ‘duty to the Queen’ is replaced by '...to do my duty to the country in which I am now living.'

=== Law ===
The Cub Scout law, referenced in the promise, is similar in aim to the Scout law and aims to convey the values of Scouts to Cub Scouts in an accessible way. The law is:

Cub Scouts always do their best
think of others before themselves
and do a good turn everyday.

== Awards and badges ==
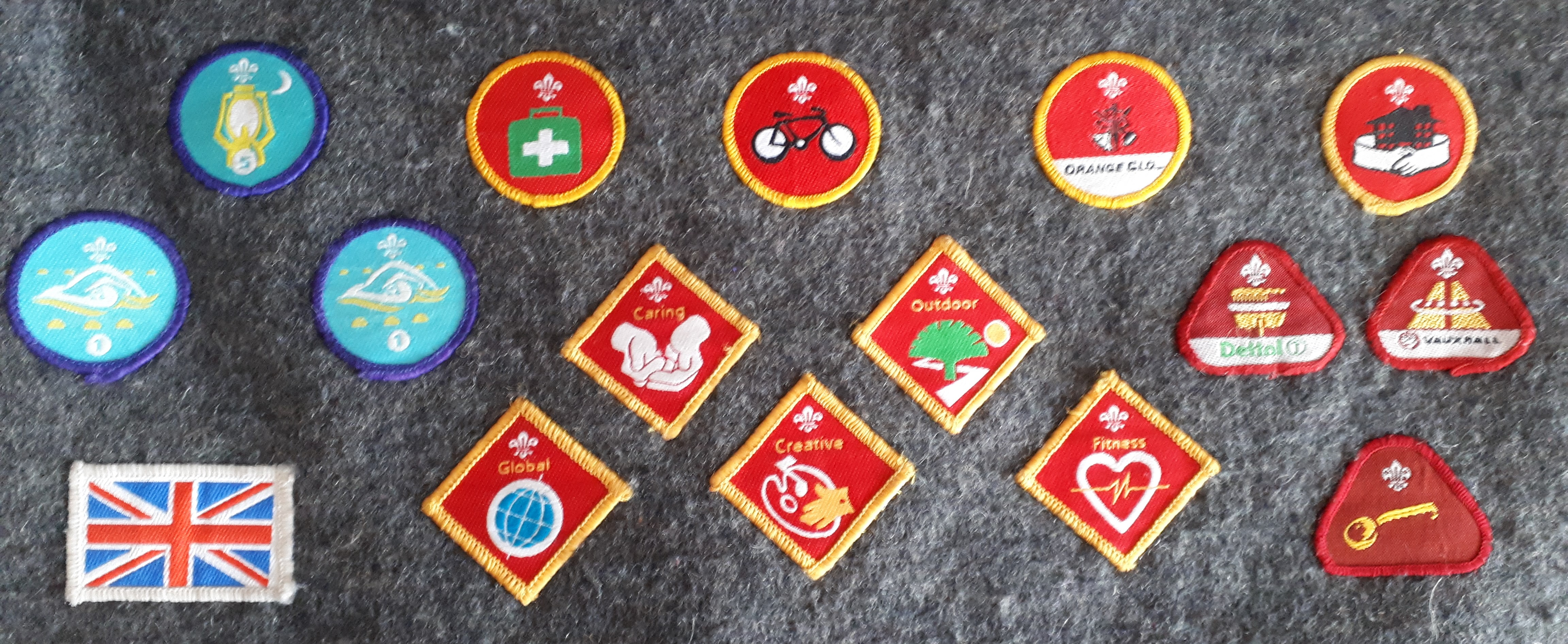
A selection of Cub Scout badges including Staged Activity badges (left), Activity badges (top), Challenge awards used 2002-2015 (bottom, middle) and Activity badges used pre-2002 (bottom right).

In common with other sections in Scouting, Cub Scouts earn badges to be sewn onto their uniform to recognise and represent achievements during their time in the Cub pack. A number are core badges which are often earned by members as part of their time in the section.

- The Membership Award is given to Cubs after they have made their promise and been invested into the section.
- Joining In Awards recognise participation in the programme and are awarded in yearly stages. These badges are worn above the Membership Award badge.
- The Moving-On Award recognises continuation of the journey through Scouts: a yellow award may be worn by Cubs to represent their time as a Beaver Scout while a red award is presented to Cubs at the conclusion of their time in Cub Scouts as they are about to join the Scout section.

=== Challenge awards ===
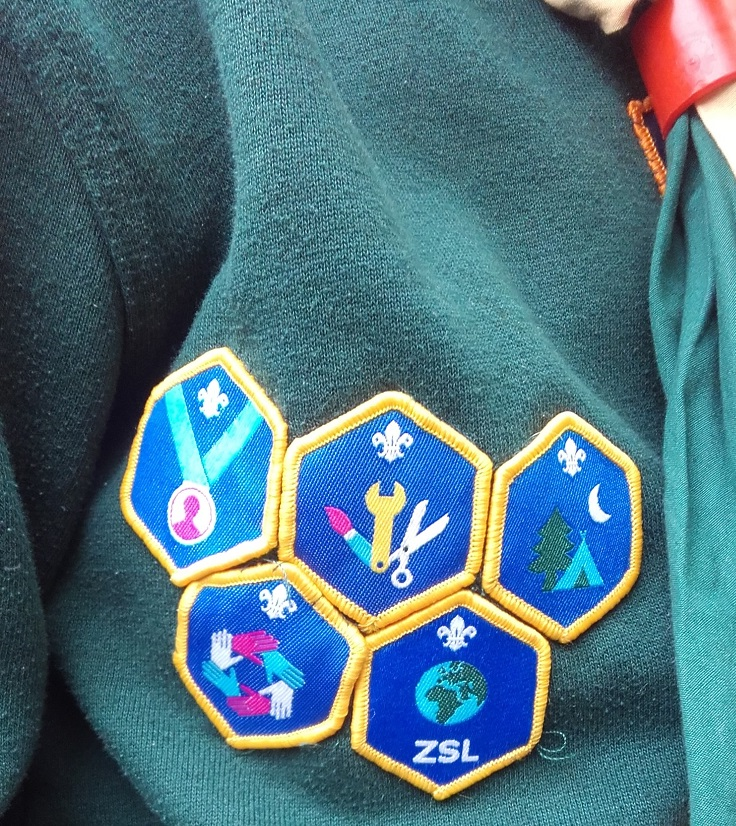
A Cub Scout wearing five of the 2015 Challenge awards.

The challenge awards are often completed together as a pack during their normal sessions and cover the range and aims of the programme. The current challenge awards were introduced in 2015 and are hexagonal in shape and dark blue in colour, worn on the chest. The seven awards are the Our Adventure, Our Outdoors, Our Skills, Our World, Personal, Teamwork and Team Leader challenges. Each Challenge involves undertaking several tasks or taking part in activities related to a particular type of challenge and may involve trying something new, learning a new skill or completing something that is personally challenging to the young person.

The top award for the section is the Chief Scout's Silver Award which is awarded upon completion of all seven Challenge awards and six other activity badges. The Scout Association recognises that young people might not have completed the Challenge programme by the time they move on to Scouts and so they can continue working towards these awards in their first term as a Scout. The award can also be worn on the Scout uniform once earned.

=== Activity badges ===
Activity badges are awarded for demonstrating skill or achievement in a particular subject, which may be an existing hobby or a new area of knowledge. As of September 2022, there are 38 badges available, with the most recently added being the Gardener badge added in January 2018, and the Money Skills Activity Badge added in June 2021. The badges are circular in shape and are red with a yellow border, replacing the previous triangular red badges used before 2002. Some badges are sponsored by a relevant business. Achievement of all activity badges is rare but often receives national attention when this is achieved.

=== Staged Activity Badges ===
Staged Activity Badges can be completed by any member of the movement between the age of 6 and 18. They are completed in different stages, so after completing each stage members are awarded the relevant badge and can advance to the next level while still in a younger section. Current Staged Activity badges that are available are Air Activities, Community Impact, Digital Citizen, Digital Maker, Emergency Aid, Hikes Away, Musician, Nautical Skills, Navigator, Nights Away, Paddle Sports, Sailing, Snowsports, Swimmer and Time on the Water. The number of stages in each badge varies but most have around five stages while the Nights Away, Hikes Away and Time on the Water stages reflect the number of cumulative experiences that the young people have undertaken in that area. There are sixteen milestones for Nights Away, ranging from 1 to 200 nights away from home, and eight (ranging from 1 to 50) for Hikes Away and Time on the Water. The badge's design is a circular blue badge with a purple border, a design adopted in 2002 and with a slight darkening of the blue colour from 2018.

== Visual identity ==
=== Uniform ===
The current Cub Scout uniform, introduced in 2001, consists of a dark green sweatshirt, a neckerchief and woggle. A branded baseball cap, navy blue activity trousers, shorts or skirt and dark green polo shirt can also form part of the uniform as well as other informal clothing such as hoodies as the situation requires it. It was designed by fashion designer Meg Andrew in 2000, and in use from 2001, as being a stylish and affordable uniform that was suited to outdoor wear and activity use. The uniform is used by any Cub Scout, with those who are part of an Air Scout or Sea Scout group also wearing this uniform style.

The Cub Scout uniform has long been associated with the dark green colour, having been chosen as the original colour in 1916 to distinguish it from the Scout uniform. The first uniform was a green woollen jersey, shorts, long socks with green-tabbed garters, neckerchief and a green cricket cap with gold piping. The Chief Scout's Advance Party Report which was published in 1966 resulted in very few changes for the section with the overall uniform remaining the same with a more modern design jersey of the same colour being used. The cap, long associated with the section, was abolished in June 1989 along with the berets worn by the older sections and trousers became an option to shorts around this time. During a movement-wide uniform consultation in 2000, over 11,000 Cub Scouts had their say on the uniform to be used from 2001 onwards. The plans for navy blue activity trousers were met with approval from 79% of Cub Scouts and the general focus on an activity sweatshirt was agreed but a proposed colour change to mint green and the proposed activity skirts, canvas belt and ski hat finding disfavour and not being adopted with the jumper remaining the familiar dark green colour.

=== Flags ===
In common with other sections of the movement, Cub Scouts have a flag for use to identify the section, in parades or when a member is being invested. It is the same size as those used by the Scout section and older and is 4 feet by 3 feet and is mounted on a wooden pole with scout fleur-de-lis at the end. The flag is yellow with white lettering, a white scout emblem on a purple circular background in the centre of the flag with the scout motto 'Be Prepared' underneath. Previously the flag lettering and the fleur-de-lis were in green against the yellow background and these colours can still be seen in some sections where they have not needed to update their flag. These colours are also still used in Scotland, with the addition of a St. Andrew's Cross next to the hoist.

=== Logo and visual identity ===
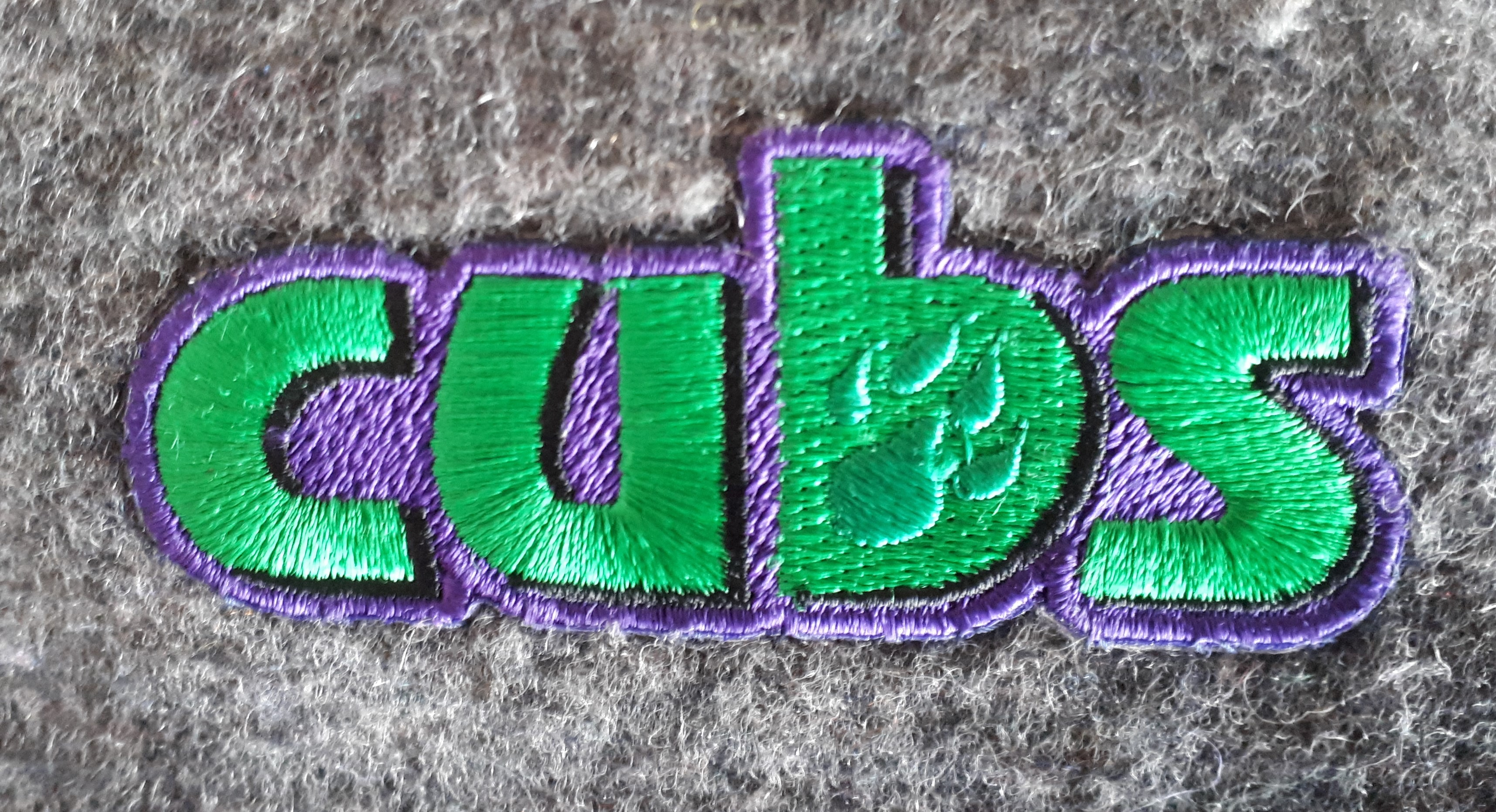
The logo used by the section between 2002 and 2015.

Between 2002 and 2015 the Cub Scout logo consisted of a lowercase 'cubs' wordmark in green with a pawprint in the counter of the 'b'. The typeface used for the logo and for headings in Cub Scout publications was a modified version of Linotype's Revue with Frutiger used for body text in line with the rest of the association. At launch in 2002 the section had a mascot, a stylised wolf called Snaggle, which was replaced in 2012 with a series of cartoon Cub Scouts taking part in adventures. Additionally the focus of text and images shifted to highlight adventure, fun, friendship and energy matching the wider Scout Association brand message of 'everyday adventure' introduced in 2008.

In 2015, the Scout Association updated their visual identity style, including the section brands, to focus on the Scouting fleur-de-lis. As part of this, the new Cub Scout logo was simplified (to remove the pawprint from the wordmark) with a fleur-de-lis added to the logo, located either in the top right of the wordmark or a larger version located directly above the wordmark. While the wordmark retained the Cub Revue typeface of the previous look, the colours were updated to match the wider Scout Association colour palette and Revue as a typeface was not used in other publications; instead TheSerif was used for headings in line with the rest of the association and Frutiger continued to be used for body text. Cub Scout publications dropped the previous mascots and instead used artwork style intended to be cheeky, humorous and anarchic such as a compass with arms holding a map that also has arms.

When the Scout Association brand was updated in May 2018, with a new and stylised fleur-de-lis, the Cub Scout logo was altered to remove the previous fleur-de-lis mark. The logo colours were also updated with the green logo becoming darker, changing from a lime green to emerald to reflect the updated corporate colour palette. Publications either continued the use of the previous artwork or used the new image style of the association and the typeface for all documents was updated to use the Google Fonts typeface Nunito Sans.

== Events ==
While there are few national events run by the Scout Association for Cub Scouts compared to the older sections, there are often events and competitions for the section run at district or county level with most open to the young people in that region to reduce the distance required to travel. Scout campsites and activity centres may also run their own events, although advertising of this is not accomplished through national Scout Association channels, such as activity days for Cub Scouts at Lower Grange farm in Kent.

=== CubJam ===
Cubjam (the Jam short for Jamboree which is the name given to large gatherings of Scouts) is a camp that takes place every three years and welcomes Cub Scouts from across the UK. It began in 2001 and run by a team from Hertfordshire Scouts starting initially in the county before becoming a regular event at Gilwell Park with events held there 2009, 2013 and 2016 which coincided with the centenary of Cub Scouts. Since 2019, the event has returned to Hertfordshire and is now held at Phasels Wood. The event offers activities for participants and are all themed for the event: 2013, 2016 and 2019 had the themes of pirates, the wild west and 'Around the world' respectively.

=== Fundays ===
Fundays is a national event for Cub Scouts, Beaver Scouts, Rainbows and Brownies and is run by Scout Adventures. It is run annually at Gilwell Park and since 2015 has also been run at Woodhouse Park Scout Adventures, both in June.

The event is designed as a 'turn up and try' activity day so that Cub Scouts and their leaders and are able to move around the site trying the activities on site without the need to pre-select or choose activities. A range of activities are offered including adventurous activities such as climbing and high ropes, creative endeavours and themed activities such as magic shows, circus acts or jousting.

=== Damboree ===
Established in 2018, Damboree is a grass-root movement to encourage leaders to apply for a camp site permit to enable Scouts to camp. Originally established to benefit the Beaver Scout section (hence the name which is a combination of Dam, named for the dams built by Beavers, and jamboree which refers to any large gathering of Scouts), in 2019 the event expanded to include Cub Scouts and their leaders as many of the same issues that were preventing Beaver Scouts from camping were also affecting Cub Scouts also.

It is part of the Scout Association, being a Scout Active Support unit of Milton Keynes Scouts, but is not directly controlled by Scouts HQ. While the event is not one specific event, there is a focus weekend planned each year which packs are encouraged to host their camps on.

== See also ==
- Age Groups in Scouting and Guiding
- Cub Scout – other similarly aged sections in the UK and around the world
