= Akela (The Jungle Book) =

Fictional wolf from Rudyard Kipling's Jungle Book Franchise

- The Jungle Book character
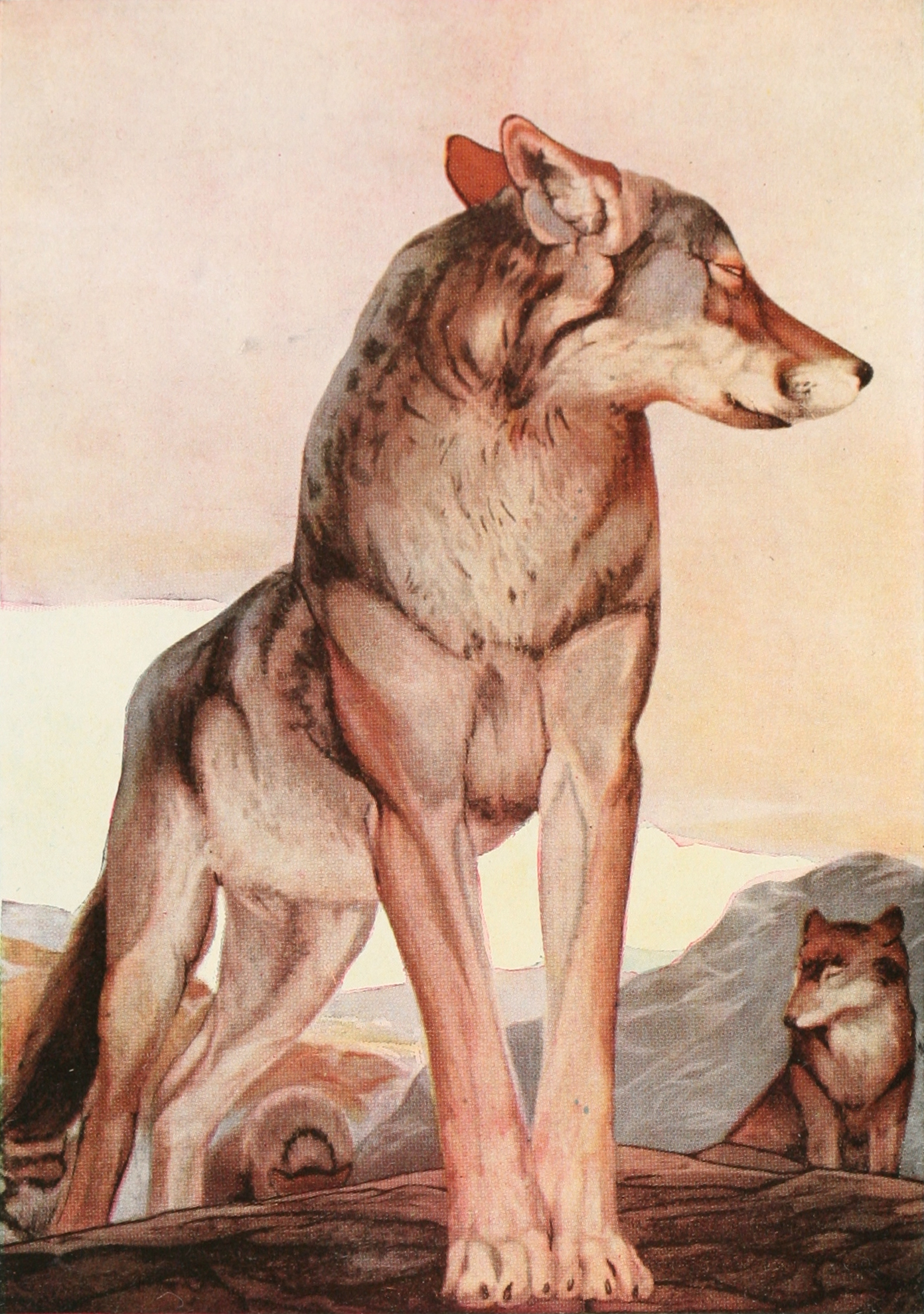
- Akela as depicted on the frontispiece of The Two Jungle Books, published in 1895.
- First appearance: "Mowgli's Brothers"
- Last appearance: "Red Dog"
- Created by: Rudyard Kipling

In-universe information
- Species: Indian wolf
- Gender: Male
- Spouse: Leah (in Jungle Cubs)
- Children: 8 unnamed puppies
- Relatives: Two parents (deceased); Leela (grand daughter); Phaona (grandson)

Akela (Akelā also called The Lone Wolf or Big Wolf) is a fictional character in Rudyard Kipling's stories, The Jungle Book (1894) and The Second Jungle Book (1895). He is the leader of the Seeonee pack of Indian wolves and presides over the pack's council meetings. It is at such a meeting that the pack adopts the lost child Mowgli and Akela becomes one of Mowgli's mentors.

Akelā means "single or solitary" in Hindi. Kipling also calls him the Lone Wolf.

Kipling portrays Akela with the character of an English gentleman. This is shown by his recurring references to the honour of the pack. He is large and grey and leads the pack by virtue of his strength and cunning.

Akela, the great gray Lone Wolf, who led all the Pack by strength and cunning, lay out at full length on his rock, and below him sat forty or more wolves of every size and colour.

— Rudyard Kipling, The Jungle Book

== Character history ==
Nine or ten years after Mowgli's adoption, his enemy Shere Khan the tiger, with the aid of some young wolves he has persuaded to support him, plans to depose Akela so that he will no longer be able to defend Mowgli. A wolf who becomes too old to hunt is traditionally driven out or killed by his pack. Akela is far from decrepit, but the young wolves deliberately drive a young, healthy buck deer toward him, knowing that he will not be able to catch it. When the council meets to depose Akela, Mowgli defends him with a blazing branch and drives Shere Khan and his allies away.

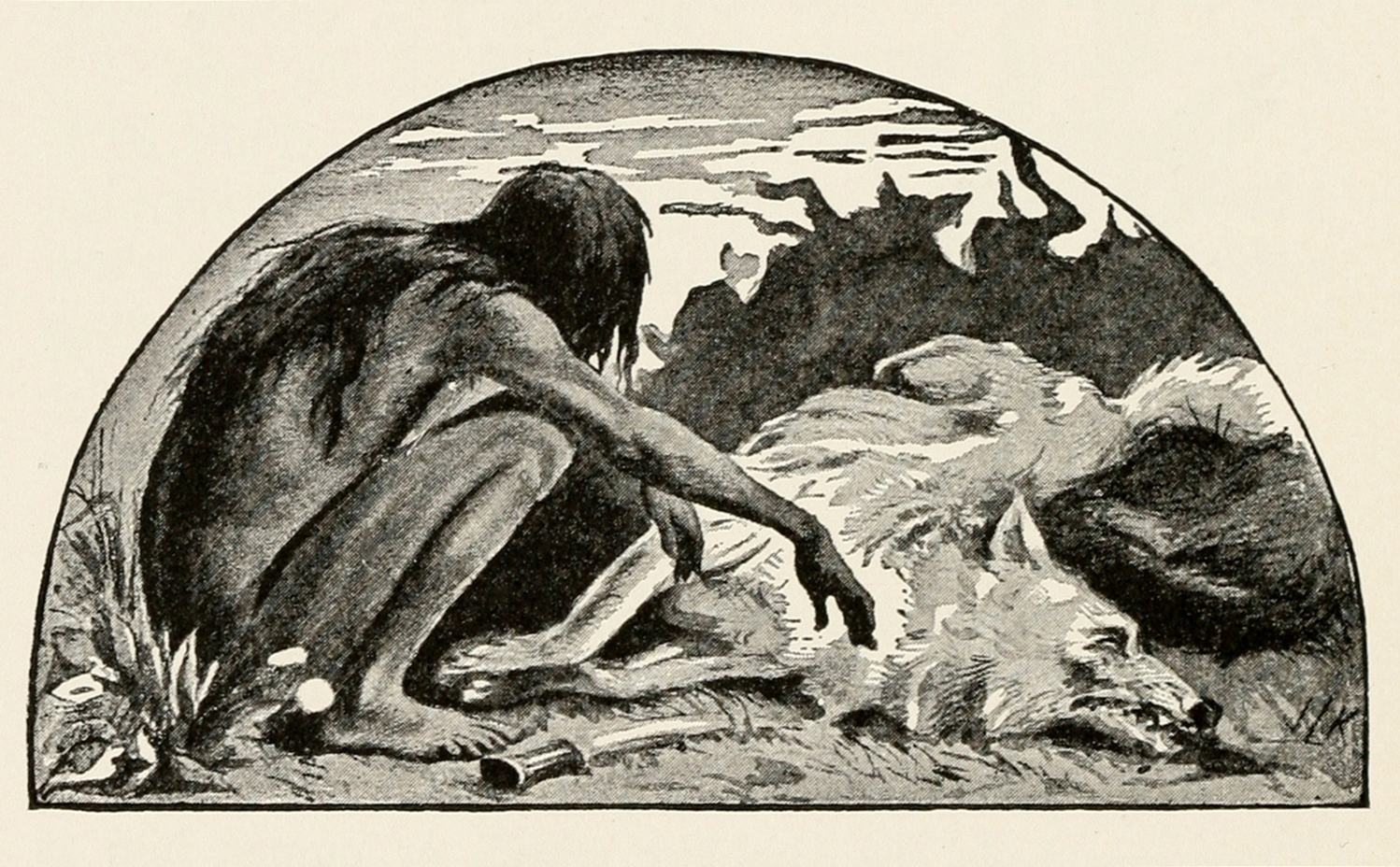
The death of Akela after his battle with the dholes, as illustrated in page 280 of the 1895 edition of The Two Jungle Books by Rudyard Kipling.

After Shere Khan's departure the remaining wolves beg Akela to stay, but he refuses to remain pack leader and decides to hunt alone. Phao becomes the new pack leader, Mowgli returns to human society, at least for a time, and Akela hunts alone. During this period Akela helps Mowgli to kill Shere Khan with the aid of the human village's water buffalo herd.

Some years later, when Mowgli has been rejected by human society and the pack is threatened with extinction by a rampaging pack of dholes, Akela joins the battle and fights to the death, finally dying in Mowgli's company ("Red Dog", in The Second Jungle Book). Akela did this for the love of Mowgli and his death is a major factor in Mowgli's decision to finally return to human society at the age of 17.

== Disney ==
- In the animated 1967 Disney adaptation, Akela (voiced by John Abbott) only has a brief role at the beginning of the film, when the council of wolves meet after Shere Khan's return to the jungle to decide what to do about Mowgli's future. Acknowledging Shere Khan on their own, they decide to send Mowgli away, with Bagheera volunteering to take Mowgli back to the man-village.
- A younger Akela appears in an episode of the prequel cartoon series Jungle Cubs, looking at the animal characters in their youth (voiced by Rob Paulsen). In the episode "The Coming of the Wolves", Akela and Leah (voiced by Kath Soucie) run away from their old wolf pack as the pack leader Cain (voiced by Jim Cummings) wants Leah for himself, forcing the two younger wolves to escape and retreat to the old temple that serves as the group's Cubhouse. Although Shere Khan initially objects to their presence when the rest of the pack arrives, the young cubs agree to help Akela and Leah, driving the rest of the pack away as Akela battles and defeats Cain. At the conclusion of the episode, Akela and Leah become the parents of a group of wolf cubs, with the other animals being appointed the cubs' godfathers. Despite their evident closeness to the other cubs in this episode, Akela and Leah never appeared again in the series.
- Akela plays a bigger role in the live-action Disney film Jungle Book: Mowgli's Story, voiced by Clancy Brown. In this adaptation, he is also the father of Mowgli's adopted family and mate of Raksha.
- In the 2016 live-action/CGI hybrid film, Giancarlo Esposito voices Akela. In an interview, Esposito describes his character as the wolf pack's fierce patriarch and as "strong and hardened" as well as "a great leader and wise teacher", welcoming of Mowgli into his pack, but at the same time, worried that Mowgli may compromise the pack's safety in the future. In the film, Akela adopts Mowgli into his pack after Bagheera rescues him. However, years later, Shere Khan threatens the wolf pack upon finding Mowgli at a gathering at the watering hole during a drought. This causes disagreement to break out on whether Mowgli should leave the pack, but Mowgli decides to leave to protect them before a decision is reached. Upon Shere Khan's return, Akela tells him that Mowgli has left. Shere Khan then kills Akela by throwing him off a cliff and assumes command of the wolf pack. Akela's death has far-reaching effects, spreading through the jungle until Mowgli hears of his murder from King Louie and decides to avenge him. Akela is finally avenged when Mowgli kills Shere Khan by causing him to fall into a pit of fire beneath a tree. Afterwards, Raksha takes Akela's place as the new leader of the pack.

== Other adaptations ==
- Akela is also a major character in the Japanese-produced Jungle Book Shōnen Mowgli, where he is voiced by Yuzuru Fujimoto in the Japanese and Walter Massey in the English dub. Akela is the leader of the wolf pack but, as he is growing old, he agrees to pass the leadership onto a worthy successor. When Alexander beats Vermillion in a contest, Akela passes the leadership onto Alexander while Vermillion leaves the pack. However, after Alexander's death, Akela takes back his role as leader. Briefly, during the series, Vermillion returns to take the leadership of the pack, but later leaves to lead another wolf pack on the plains. Therefore, Akela assumes the leadership of the pack once more, but since he had become too feeble and old to be an active leader, he stayed in his lair for most of his day. Subsequently, Luri takes over the leadership of the pack from Akela, but he stays on as an adviser and is given the title of the "Wise Old Wolf". At the very end of the series, Akela gets severely injured in a battle against a pack of jackals, and although he manages to recover from the wounds, he is severely weakened from the fight and soon dies.
- In Mowgli: Legend of the Jungle, Akela is voiced by Peter Mullan. He and his pack adopt Mowgli and keep him safe from Shere Khan and Tabaqui. Shere Khan states to Akela that he will return to claim his territory the day when Akela misses his prey. Years later, this happens when Akela fails to catch a deer. When Shere Khan and Tabaqui arrive, they get some of the wolves on their side and Akela is challenged. Mowgli uses fire to drive them away, but shames himself in the eyes of Akela, who regretfully tells Mowgli to leave the pack immediately. Shere Khan and his minions quickly drive Akela and his supporters to the edge of the jungle. When Mowgli seeks their help in defeating Shere Khan, Akela refuses, as it would break the jungle law. However, during the duel between Shere Khan and Mowgli outside the man village, Akela has a change of heart and saves Mowgli from the tiger, but in doing takes the bullet the hunter John Lockwood meant for Shere Khan. Before Akela dies, he admits to his own faults before apologizing for abandoning Mowgli and gives the boy his blessing to lead the jungle's creatures and the wolf pack.
- In the Soviet animated series Adventures of Mowgli, Akela is voiced by Lev Lubetsky and Yuri Puzyryov. In the joint Russian-American production of 1996 for the English-speaking audience he is voiced by David Kaye.

== Influence ==
Lord Baden-Powell, the founder of scouting, based aspects of Cub Scouting on Rudyard Kipling's Mowgli Stories. In Cub Scouting, the terms "Law of the Pack", "Akela" (the leader of a group), "Wolf Cub", "Grand Howl", "den", and "pack" all refer to Kipling's work. He wrote The Wolf Cub's Handbook, in which he compares scouting to a wolf pack and scout leaders to the character of Akela. The cubs usually chant in their pack meetings, "Akela, we will do our best."
