= Grand Howl =

Cub Scout and Brownie ceremony

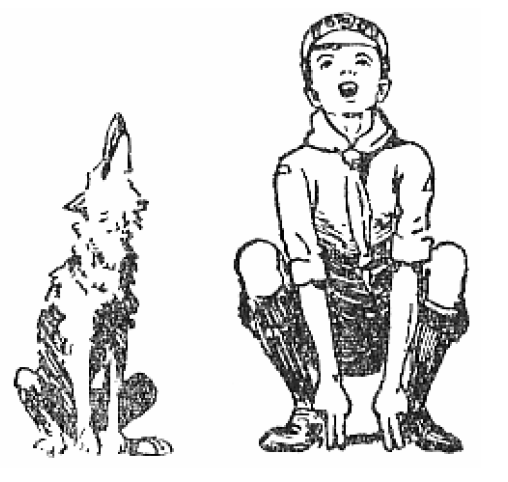
- Baden-Powell's illustration in The Wolf Cub's Handbook (1916) showing how a Wolf Cub's squatting posture imitates a wolf at the Grand Howl, a ceremony based on The Jungle Book

The Grand Howl is a ceremony which was traditionally used by Cub Scouts and Brownies. It was devised by Robert Baden-Powell, the author of the scouting guide Scouting for Boys, and is based on the Mowgli stories in Rudyard Kipling's Jungle Book. In the ceremony, Cubs act out the wolves greeting Akela, the "Old Wolf", at the Council Rock and are reminded of the Cub Scout Promise. Baden-Powell also created a Grand Howl for Brownie Guides, which was in imitation of an owl instead of a wolf. It has been used as an opening and closing ceremony as well as a method of conveying gratitude or appreciation by all sections of Scouting.

== Origin ==
In the wild, wolves howl to assemble the pack usually before and after hunts, to pass on an alarm particularly at a den site, to locate each other during a storm or while crossing unfamiliar territory, and to communicate across great distances. Grand howls had been part of social occasions since at least the 1850s.

Five years after the founding of the Scout movement, Baden-Powell and others worked on a scheme for those who were too young to join the Boy Scouts at the age of 11, initially called "Junior Scouts". By the time of the launch of the scheme, Baden-Powell had obtained the approval of his friend and neighbor, Rudyard Kipling, to use the Jungle Book as a theme. Under the name of "Wolf Cubs", the 8- to 10-year-old boys would take part in basic versions of the activities enjoyed by the older Boy Scouts, but within a background of the jungle in the Mowgli stories of Kipling's 1898 book. The Cubs would act out scenes from the stories, and the adult leaders would adopt the names of characters from the book. For example, the leader in charge would be titled Akela, after the character Akela who led the titular Mowgli's wolf pack in Kipling's novel.

Baden-Powell book, entitled The Wolf Cub's Handbook, was published on 2 December 1916. In the first chapter, he describes the following scene in The Jungle Book and provides some additional context for the Grand Howl ceremony:

The wolves all sat round the council rock in a circle, and when Akela, the old wolf, the head of the pack, took his place on the rock, they all threw up their heads and howled their greeting to him. When your Old Wolf, Akela - that is your Cubmaster or other Scouter - comes to your meeting you salute him by squatting round in a circle as young wolves do, and giving him the Wolf Cub Grand Howl.

— Robert Baden-Powell, The Wolf Cub's Handbook

== Original Grand Howl ==
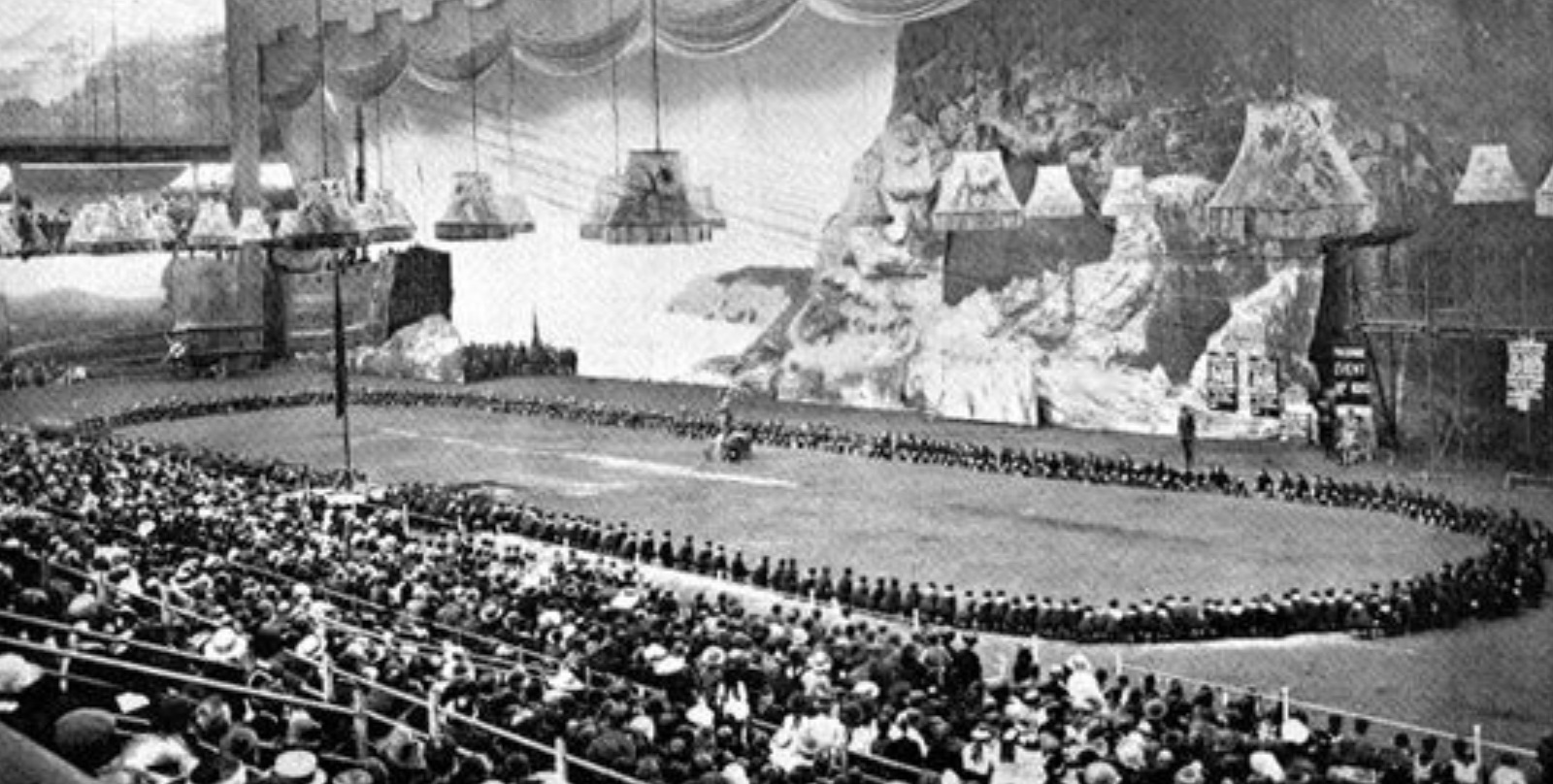
At the 1st World Scout Jamboree, 500 Wolf Cubs perform a Grand Howl in the arena at Olympia, London.

The original instructions for the Grand Howl, described by Vera Barclay and Baden-Powell in The Wolf Cub's Handbook, are as follows:

Form yourselves into a circle (quickly, a Wolf Cub never walks, he runs!). Then squat down on your heels with your two fore paws on the ground between your feet, knees out to either side. Then when the Old Wolf comes to the Pack, the young Wolves throw up their heads and howl. But their howl means something. They want to welcome him, and at the same time to show that they are ready to obey his command. The call of the Pack all over the world is “We’ll do our best”; so when your Cubmaster comes into the circle you chuck up your chins and, all together, you howl out — making each word a long yowl: “Ah-kay-la! — We-e-e-e-ll do-o-o-o o-o-o-u-u-r BEST.” Yell the word “best” sharp and loud and short and all together; and at the same time spring to your feet with two fingers of each hand pointing upwards at each side of your head, to look like two wolf’s ears. That’s the way to do it. Now what does it mean? It means that you will do your best with BOTH hands — not merely with one like most boys, who only use their right hand. Your best will be twice as good as any ordinary boy’s best. “Do your best” is the Cub’s motto. Then keep your two hands up while the leading Cub calls to the Pack, at the top of his voice: “Dyb-dyb-dyb-dyb” (meaning Do Your Best). Then every Cub after the fourth “dyb” drops his left hand smartly to his side and keeping the right hand at the salute, with two fingers up, but now spread out making the salute, squeals “We-e-e-l” and barks out “Dob-dob-dob-dob” (We’ll Do Our Best). After the fourth “dob” each Cub drops his right hand smartly to his side and stands at the “Alert” and waits for orders.

== National variants ==
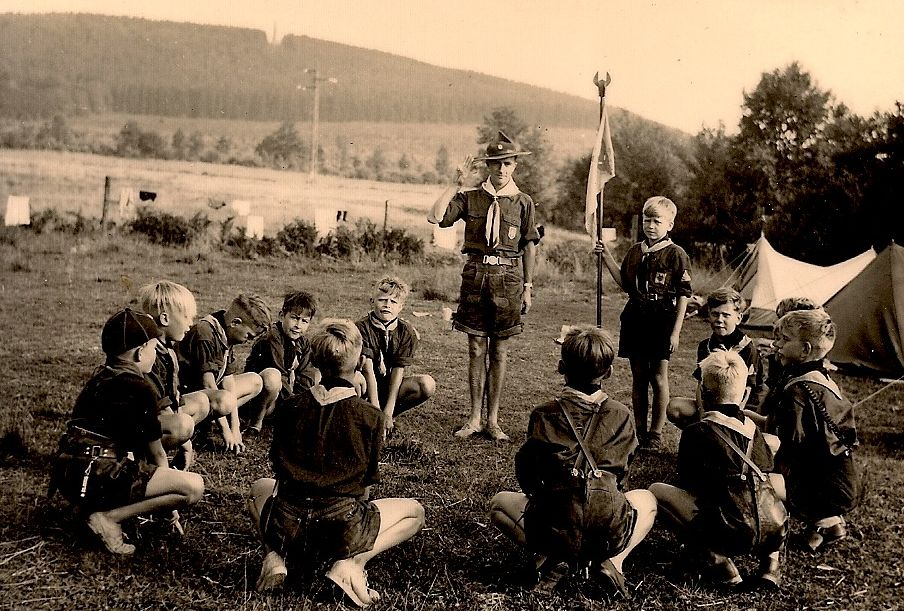
A Grand Howl by German Cubs of the Bund Deutscher Pfadfinder in 1950

=== United Kingdom ===
In 1966, a complete review of the UK Scout Association, The Chief Scouts' Advance Party Report, recommended that less emphasis be placed on the Jungle Book for Wolf Cubs, who were to be renamed Cub Scouts. Although the Grand Howl was to be retained, it was revised, replacing the "dybs" with plain language to "make the significance clearer to parents and public". The recommendations were accepted and began to be implemented in October 1966. The revised Grand Howl is as follows:

Pack in circle.
Cub Scout Leader in centre, arms outstretched facing Sixer;
Cub Scout Leader arms down;
Pack squats.
Pack: "Akela! We'll do our best".
Sixer: "Cubs! Do your best".
Cubs: "We will do our best", giving the Scout salute (which had replaced the two-finger salute in the Cub Section).

Following a further programme review between 2000 and 2002, the Grand Howl became optional, allowing Packs to adopt themes other than the Jungle Book - although local groups had always adapted the ceremony.

The independent Baden-Powell Scouts' Association and British Boy Scouts and British Girl Scouts Association continue with the original Grand Howl.

=== United States ===
The Cub Scout program of the Boy Scouts of America and Brownies of the Girl Scouts of the USA have used the traditional Grand Howl as a "special recognition ceremony" with the person being honored (a guest, parent or member of the Pack), standing in the center of the circle. In addition, a Short Grand Howl can be used as follows:

Cubs make the two fingered Cub Scout Sign with both hands, fingertips touching the floor in a squatting position.
They howl; "Ah-h-kay-y-la! We-e-e'll do-o-o ou-u-r best!"
As they yell the last word, "best", they jump up with both hands above their heads in the Cub Scouts Sign.

=== Canada ===
The Cub Scouts of Scouts Canada use the traditional Grand Howl. The following version is used in French speaking Packs:

A-a-a K-é-é La-a,
De... no... tre... mieux!
De... vo... tre... mieux!
Oui, de... no... tre... mieux!

=== Australia ===
The Grand Howl used by the Cub Scouts of Scouts Australia is as follows:

Cub Scouts: "A-ke-la, we'll do our best."
Selected Cub Scout: "Do your best."
Cub Scouts: "We'll do our best."

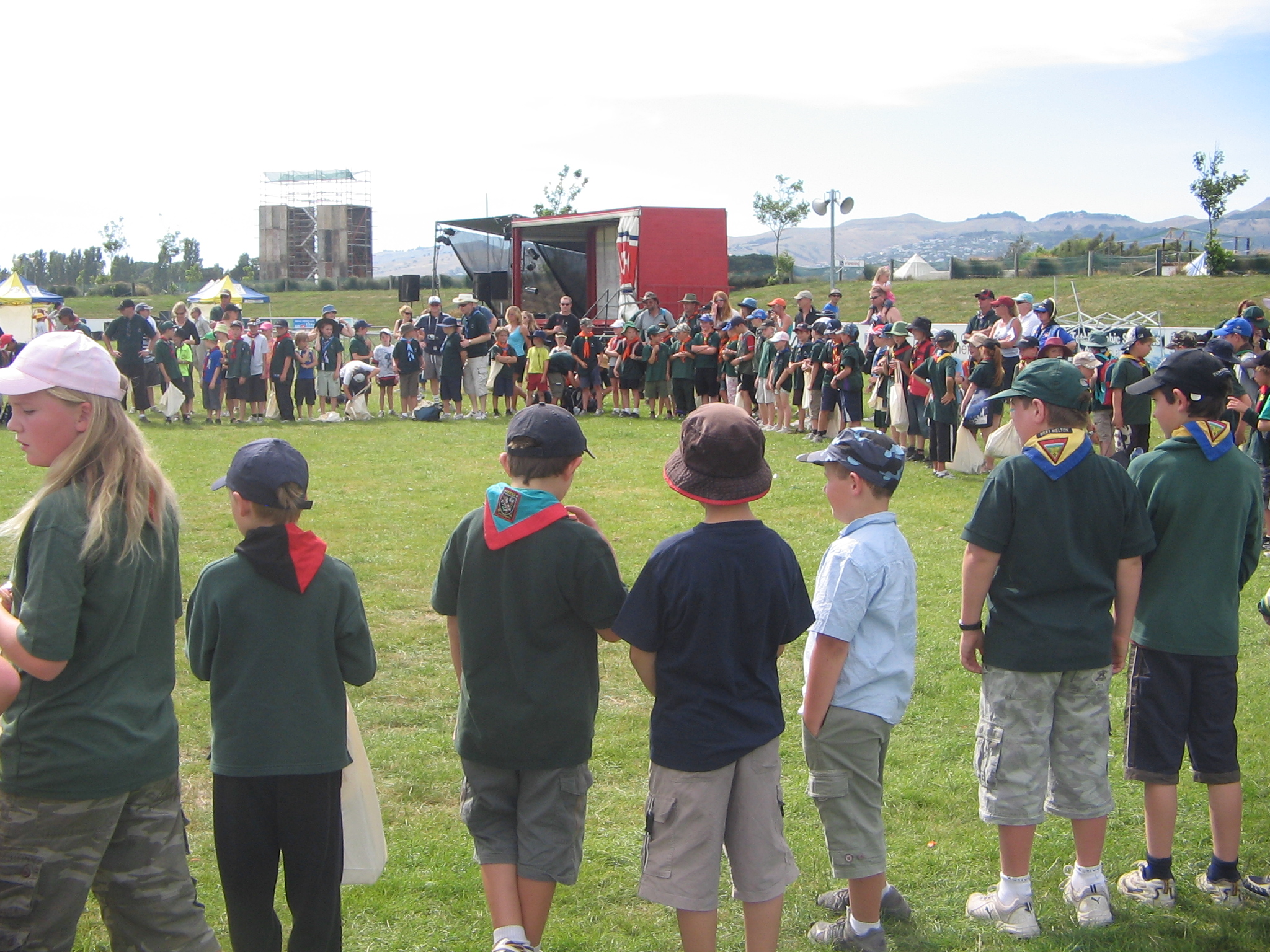
New Zealand Cubs prepare for a Grand Howl at the 18th National Scout Jamboree in Christchurch, January 2008.

=== New Zealand ===
The Grand Howl used by the Cubs of Scouts New Zealand is identical to the version currently used in the United Kingdom.

=== Brazil ===
The Grand Howl of the Scouts of Brazil goes as follows: Akela forms the Pack into a circle position, and when he chooses a pack member, everyone goes in the Cub Scout squatting position and say:

"Akela, we'll do our best!"

Then, everybody stands up doing the two fingered Cub Scout Sign with both hands, to represent a wolf's ears, and the chosen cub says:

"Best, Best, Best, Best?"

Then all the pack, doing the Cub Scout salute, says:

"Yes! Best, Best, Best, Best!"

== Brownies ==
A junior section of Girl Guides started in 1914 in the United Kingdom, under the name of "Rosebuds"; this name was disliked by girls and it was soon amended to Brownies, being themed on the story by Juliana Ewing. In Baden-Powell's 1918 book, "Girl Guiding: A Handbook for Brownies, Guides and Rangers", the Grand Howl is described as "the grandest salute a Pack (of Brownies) can give, and is only for very special occasions". Baden-Powell describes how the Brownies should begin in a squatting position, in the same way as the Cub equivalent, but repeating "Tu-whit, tu-whit, Tu-whoo-oo" three times, each time getting louder and rising higher, until at the end of the third repetition, the Brownies were to jump in the air and clap their hands above their heads.

In the United Kingdom, the 1966 report called Tomorrow's Guide by a Working Party set up to revise and update the programme of the Girl Guides Association, recommended a reduction in the number of ceremonies used by Brownies; the Grand Howl was not retained. The Brownie Grand Howl is still used by the Girl Guides of Canada.

== Cultural impact ==
A Wolf Cub Grand Howl takes place in George Orwell's A Clergyman's Daughter.

== See also ==
- Campfire ash ceremony
- Cheer

== Bibliography ==
- Lopez, Barry H. (1978). Of Wolves and Men. J. M. Dent and Sons Limited. ISBN 978-0-7432-4936-2.
