= Skills Challenge =

Skills Challenge may refer to

- the annual NBA All-Star Weekend Skills Challenge
- the Our Skills Challenge Award, one of the UK's Cub Scouts' challenge awards
