= Campfire ash ceremony =

Ceremony associated with Scouting

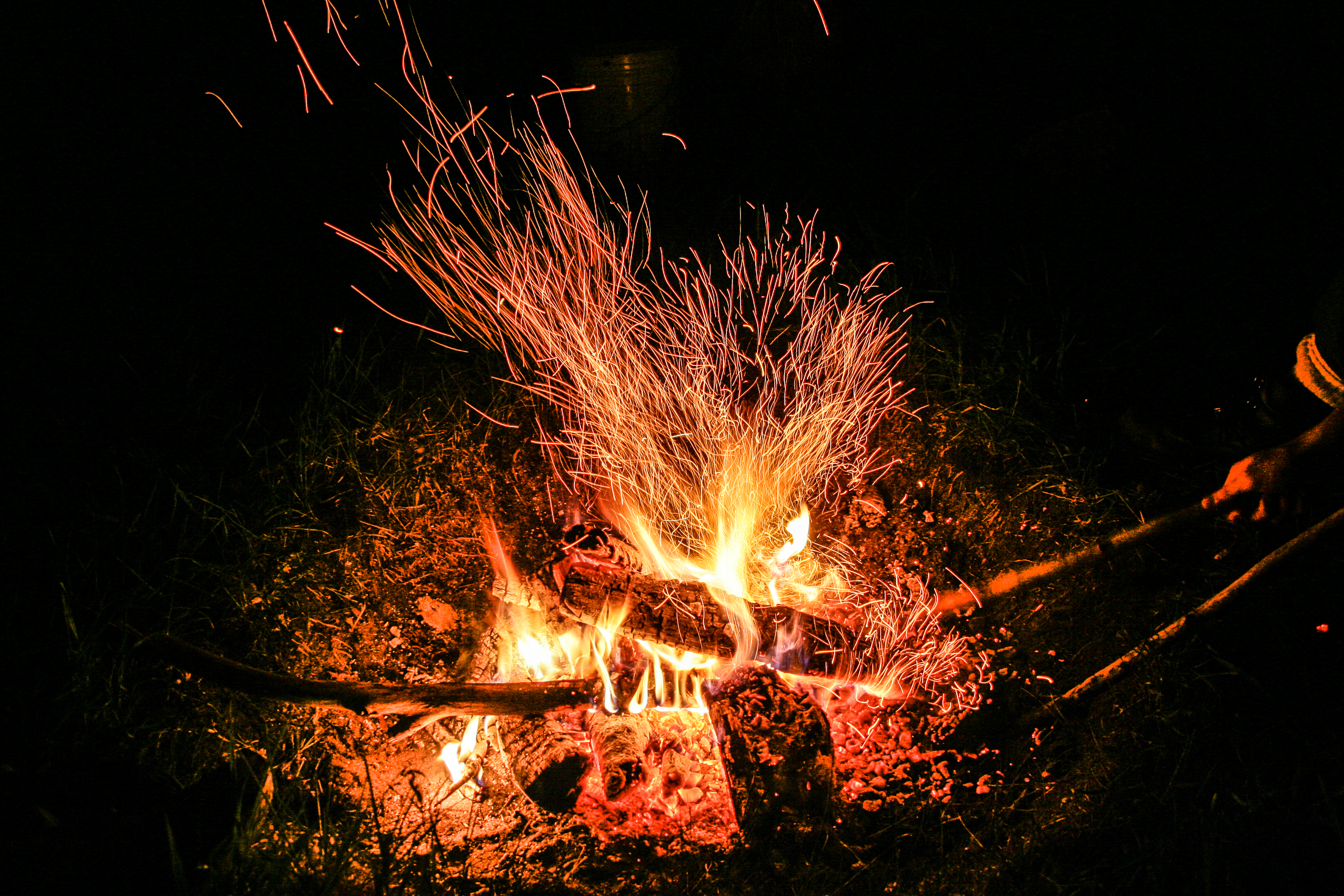
- Campfire

The campfire ash ceremony (also known as a friendship ash ceremony) is a ritual associated with Scouting meant to convey the long history and fellowship associated with the movement. Attributed to Lord Baden-Powell, it is said that he would take a small amount of the ashes from the campfire he was at, and would take them to add to the next campfire he attended.

== Background ==
In Scouting, the tradition is said to have started with Baden-Powell at Brownsea Island Scout camp in 1907.

Lord Robert Baden-Powell was the father of the Scouting movement. In 1907, on Brownsea Island in England, he conducted the first Scout Camp for boys. At the end of that camp, he gave some the ashes from the camp fire to each of the boys and kept some for himself. Legend says on his journeys throughout the world he would take ashes from campfires he would attend and spread them in the next ceremonial campfire he attended.
The ashes have been passed from one to another now for 100 years. Imagine. 100 Years of campfires, friends and fellowship.

— Typical explanation of the ash ceremony

The ceremony is conducted by Boy Scouts, Girl Scouts and Girl Guides around the world. The ashes are generally added to the campfire toward the end of the program. Once the ashes have cooled, they are stirred and new samples are taken to mix with the next campfire. When the new ashes are distributed, each recipient is given a small container of ashes and a list of all the previous campfires, with some of these list going back to 1907. At times, multiple sets of ashes are combined in one fire.

There are various ceremonies, and they are sometimes referred to friendship ashes. Most ceremonies involve retelling the story of the ashes and are meant to reinforce the idea that the Scouts, or Guides, around the campfire are part of an international movement that goes back more than a century. The Girl Scouts of Western Ohio of the Girl Scouts of the USA, for example, said that the ash ceremony's purpose is to "bring to the attention of all Girl Scouts and Guides the global sisterhood of Girl Scouts and remind girls that Girl Scouts has an enduring legacy passed down from member to member going back over 100 years". Some sets of ashes are said to have been passed from one campfire to the next since 1907.

In the United States, there is a belief that the ashes from this ceremony cannot be mixed with the ashes from a flag disposal ceremony. However, United States flag protocol, and the United States Flag Code do not prohibit the mixing of ashes, and simply state the flag be destroyed in a dignified manner.

== See also ==
- Grand Howl
