= The Jungle Book and Scouting =

Overview of related literary-organizational themes

The Scouting programme has used themes from The Jungle Book by Rudyard Kipling since 1916.

In 1914, Robert Baden-Powell announced a Junior Section for Scouting. In 1916, he published his outlines for such a scheme, to be called Wolf Cubbing. Baden-Powell may have had several reasons to call this section Wolf Cubs: Wolf was the name of the cannon made in the railway workshops at Mafeking. By analogy, a young boy not old enough to be a wolf or a true Scout could be a baby wolf or a Wolf Cub.

Baden-Powell asked his friend Rudyard Kipling for the use of his Jungle Book history and universe as a motivational frame in cub scouting. Baden-Powell wrote a new book, The Wolf Cub's Handbook, for junior members. In 1917, junior members became known as Wolf Cubs.

In the 1960s and later, the Wolf Cub section departed in many organisations from the jungle theme. Some changed their name to Cub Scout or something similar but retained the Jungle Stories and Cub ceremony as tradition—such as the use of Jungle Books names (as described below); and the Grand Howl which signals the start and end of the Cub Scout Meetings. Other organisations kept the name but changed the theme.

== Akela ==
In Cub Scout packs, Akela is a symbol of wisdom, authority, and leadership. Akela is anyone who acts as a leader to the Scout. Akela can be a Cubmaster, Den Leader, parent or teacher depending on where the guidance takes place. In den meetings, it is the Den Leader who is Akela. During pack meetings, it is the Cubmaster. At home, the parents fill this role. Sir Robert Baden-Powell, the founder of the Scouting movement, chose Rudyard Kipling's The Jungle Book as a source of symbolism and allegorical framework for the youngest members of the Scouting movement. Many references are made to this story in the Cub Scout section, including the "Council Rock" for discussions and planning, and the "Grand Howl" to express a sense of belonging and team spirit.

Many Cub Scout packs use an oath called the "Law of the Pack" to show allegiance and demonstrate their relationship to Akela and the pack:

The Cub Scout follows Akela.
The Cub Scout helps the pack go.
The pack helps the Cub Scout grow.
The Cub Scout gives goodwill.

In the United Kingdom, where nearly all of the links with The Jungle Book have been taken out of the Cub Scout programme, the names of Jungle Book characters are still used for Cub Scout Leaders. Akela is still reserved for the Leader of a Cub Pack but is not universally in use (i.e., other character names can be held by the leader, usually to avoid confusion when there is a change of leadership).

Rudyard Kipling obtained the name "Akela" from Hindi, meaning "alone".
