= 1st World Scout Jamboree =

International Youth event in London, 1920

- placeholder badge as no official badge was issued
- Location: Olympia, London
- Country: United Kingdom
- Date: 30 July 1920 to 8 August 1920
- Attendance: 8,000 Scouts
Previous -	Next; 2nd World Scout Jamboree

The 1st World Scout Jamboree was held from 30 July to 8 August 1920, hosted by The Boy Scouts Association of the United Kingdom at Kensington Olympia in London. 8,000 Scouts from 34 nations attended the event, which was hosted in a glass-roofed building covering an area of 6 acres (24,000 m^{2}). The organizing secretary was Major Alexander Gawthrope Wade, MC.

The Jamboree was compared to the League of Nations and called a "League of Youth".

== Olympia and camping ==
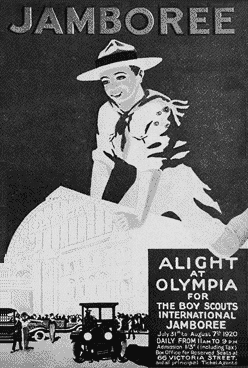
Poster used to advertise the 1st World Scout Jamboree

The Olympia arena was filled with a foot-(30 cm)-deep layer of earth, which was turfed over, enabling the Scouts to pitch tents within the glass-roofed hall.

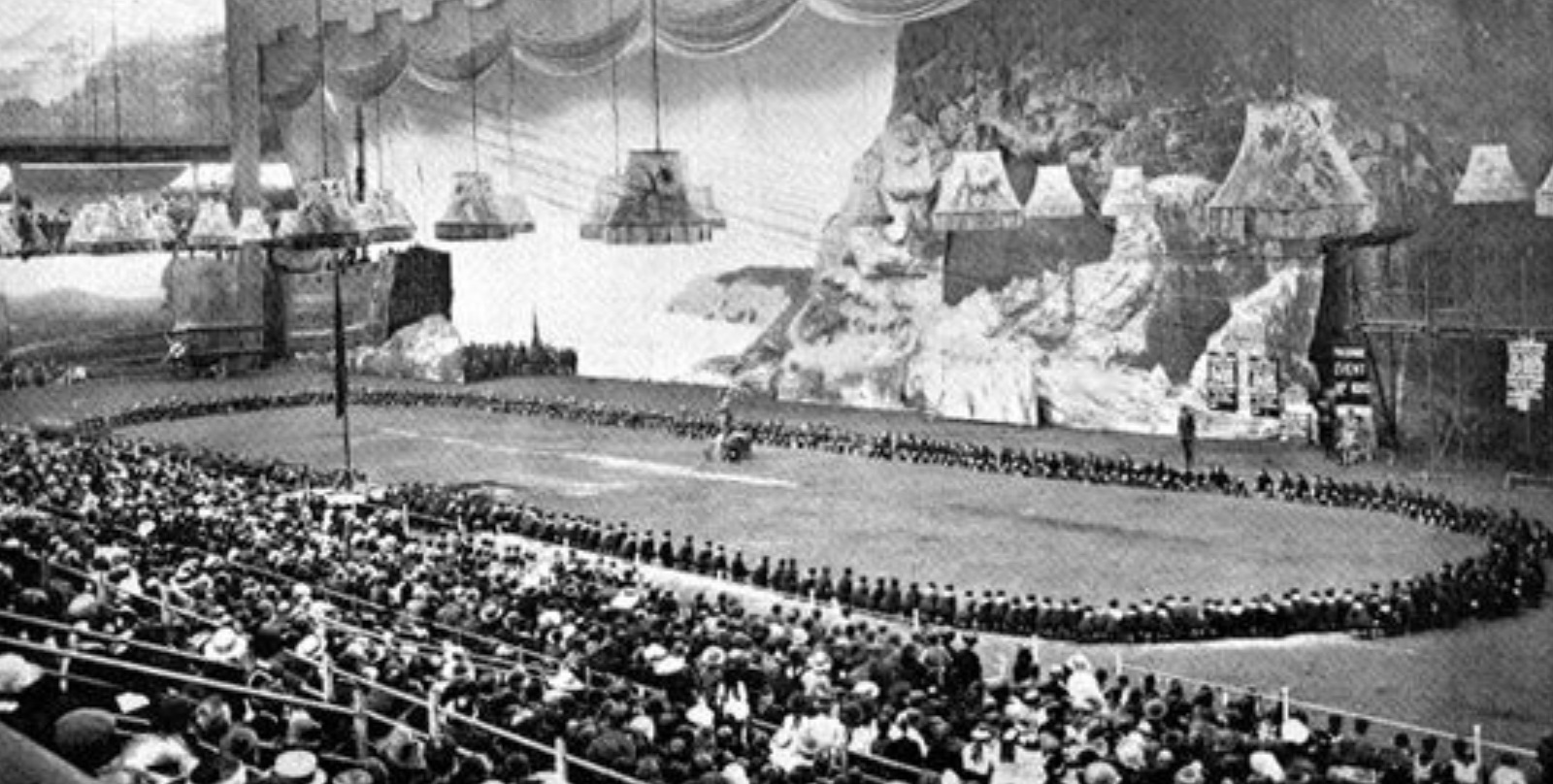
500 Wolf Cubs perform a Grand Howl in the arena at Olympia

However, around 5,000 of the Scouts were encamped at the Old Deer Park in nearby Richmond. The Scouts rotated in and out of Olympia to give them all the opportunity to participate in the events there. The Thames flooded the campsite one night and Scouts had to be evacuated.

Olympia hosted numerous exhibitions, pageants and contests (including tug-of-war) during the Jamboree event. Olympia and Old Deer Park events were open to the public. Attendances were such that entrance was restricted to restrict incidents of crushing.

Oswald Stoll produced a show at the Alhambra Theatre of Variety for visiting scouts.

== Opening show ==
The event was formally opened by the King's uncle (Prince Arthur Duke of Connaught and Strathearn), and daughter (Mary, Princess Royal and Countess of Harewood. The King, George V, unable to attend the event, sent a message of welcome to the visiting contingents in a message to Baden Powell.

== Closing ceremony ==
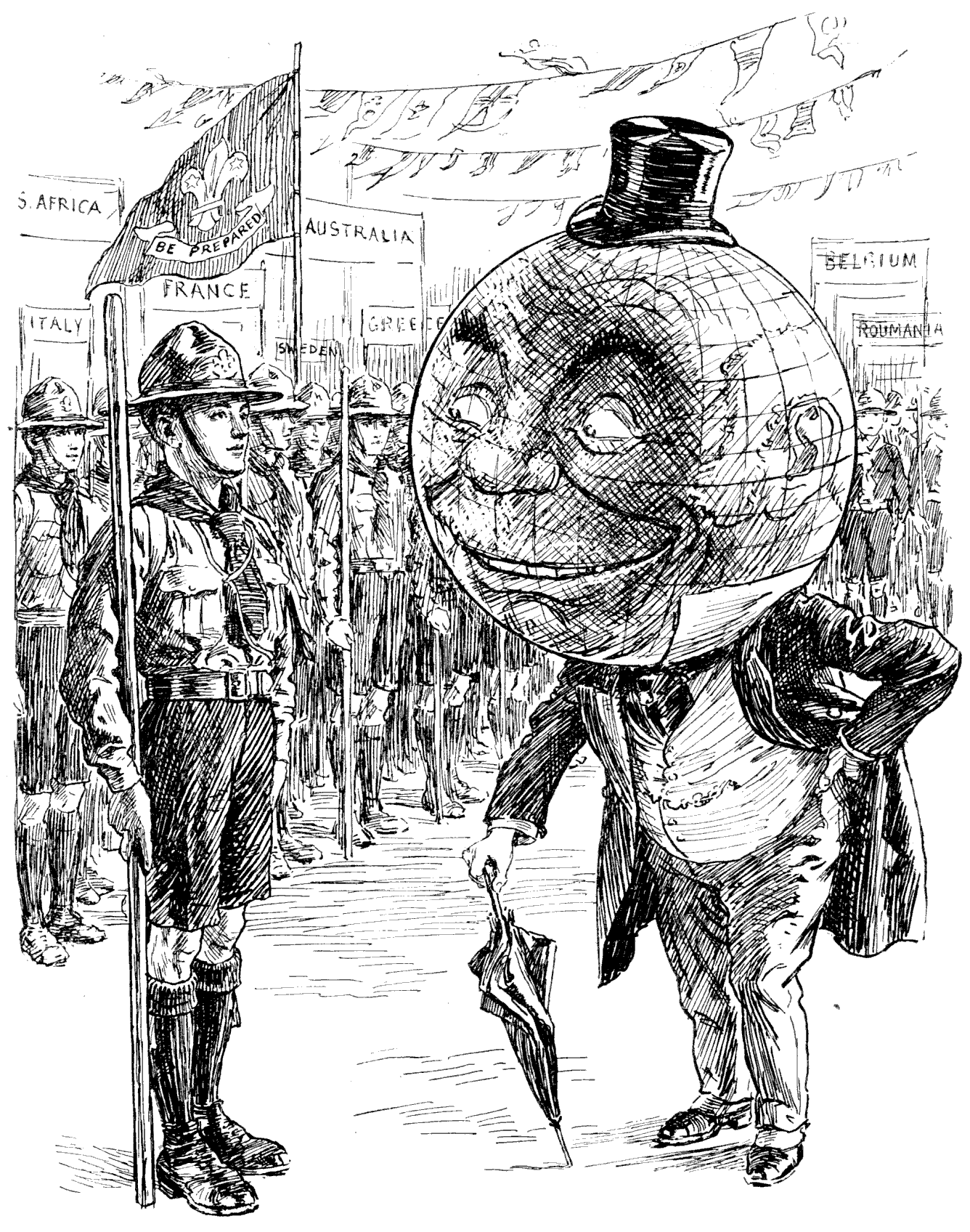
The League of Youth War-weary World (at the Jamboree). "I was nearly losing hope, but the sight of all you boys gives it back to me." Cartoon in Punch magazine 4 August 1920, referring to the 1st World Scout Jamboree in the context of the aftermath of World War I

The Scout Association's founder and Chief Scout, Robert Baden-Powell gave a closing speech at the end of the Jamboree:

"Brother Scouts. Differences exist between the peoples of the world in thought and sentiment, just as they do in language and physique. The Jamboree has taught us that if we exercise mutual forbearance and give and take, then there is sympathy and harmony. If it be your will, let us go forth fully determined that we will develop among ourselves and our boys that comradeship, through the world wide spirit of the Scout brotherhood, so that we may help to develop peace and happiness in the world and goodwill among men".

=== Baden-Powell proclaimed Chief Scout of the World ===
James E. West, the Chief Scout Executive of the Boy Scouts of America had suggested that Baden-Powell be given the title of Great Indian Chief. As part of the staged closing ceremony of the jamboree, run by Baden-Powell's organization, his organization proclaimed him to be Chief Scout of the World. Use of the title Chief Scout of the World was allowed to lapse after his death in 1941.

== Jamborees since 1920 ==
Many lessons were learnt from the first World Scout Jamboree, including the acknowledgement that an indoor venue was too restrictive for the activities and numbers of Scouts who would attend. It was also realised that above all else, a Jamboree is a means of developing a spirit of comradeship among the boys of many nations and the more that aspect can be stressed, the more successful a Jamboree becomes.

== Contingents ==
- Australia
- Belgium
- Canada
- Ceylon
- Chile
- China
- Czechoslovakia
- Denmark
- England
- Estonia
- France
- Gibraltar
- Greece
- India
- Irish Free State
- Italy
- Jamaica
- Japan
- Luxembourg
- Malaya
- Malta
- Netherlands
- New Zealand
- Norway
- Poland
- Portugal
- Romania
- Scotland
- Siam
- South Africa
- Spain
- Sweden
- Switzerland
- United States (35 States)
- Wales
- Yugoslavia

== Exhibits ==
Amongst the thousands of Scouts, there was also a selection of wild animals at the Jamboree:

- An alligator from Florida
- A baby crocodile from Jamaica
- A lioness cub from Rhodesia
- Llamas
- Monkeys from South Africa
- A baby elephant
- A camel
- A kangaroo

== Official badge ==
There was no official badge for this event; the first badge was made for the 2nd World Scout Jamboree. There was later a placeholder badge made to make the set of reminder badges complete.
