= Two-finger salute =

Salute given using only the middle and index fingers

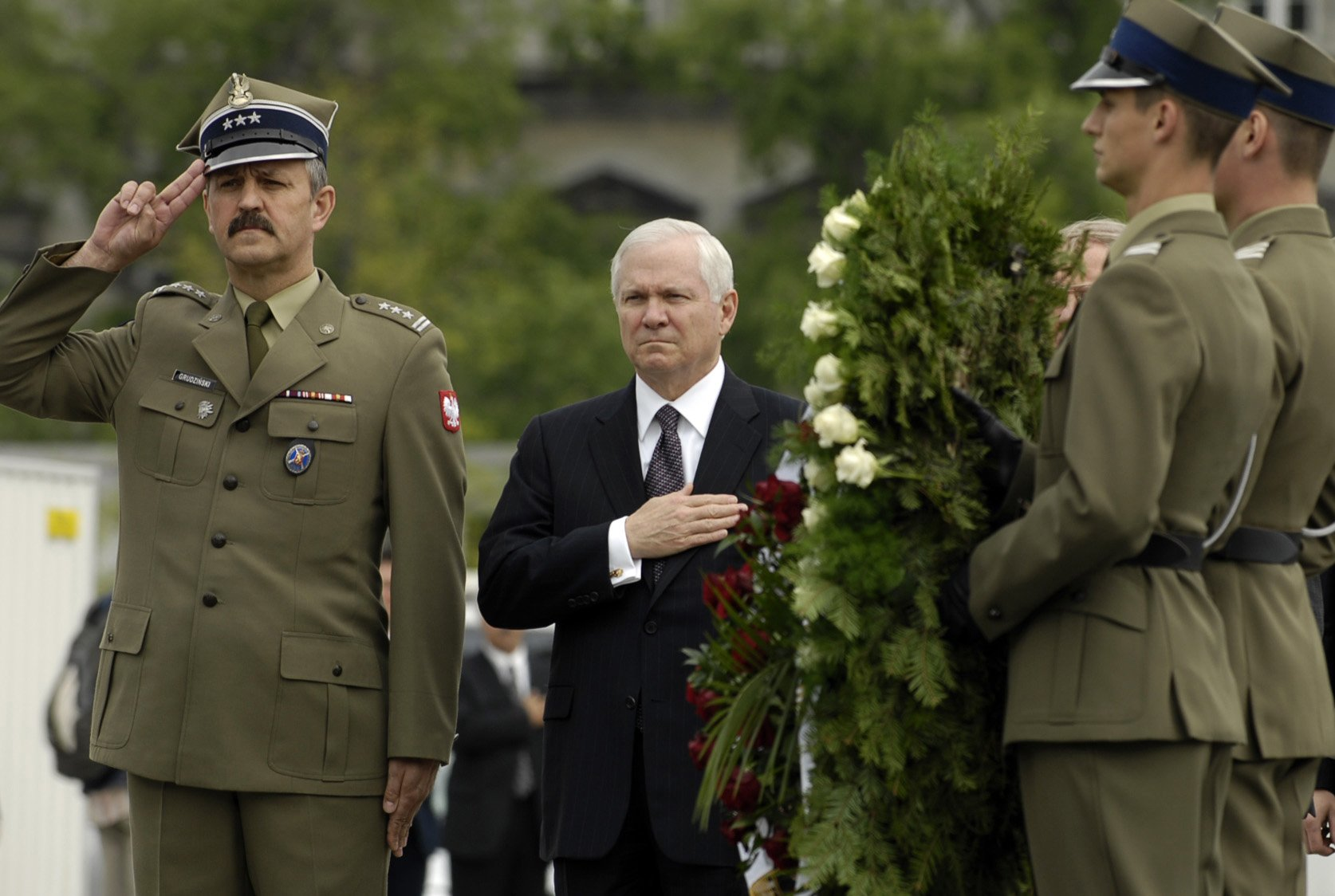
Officer of the Polish Armed Forces (on the left) performing the two-finger salute

The two-finger salute is a salute given using only the middle and index fingers, while bending the other fingers at the second knuckle, and with the palm facing the signer. This salute is used by the Polish Armed Forces, other uniformed services in Poland, and, in some countries, the Cub Scouts.

== Two-finger salute in Poland ==
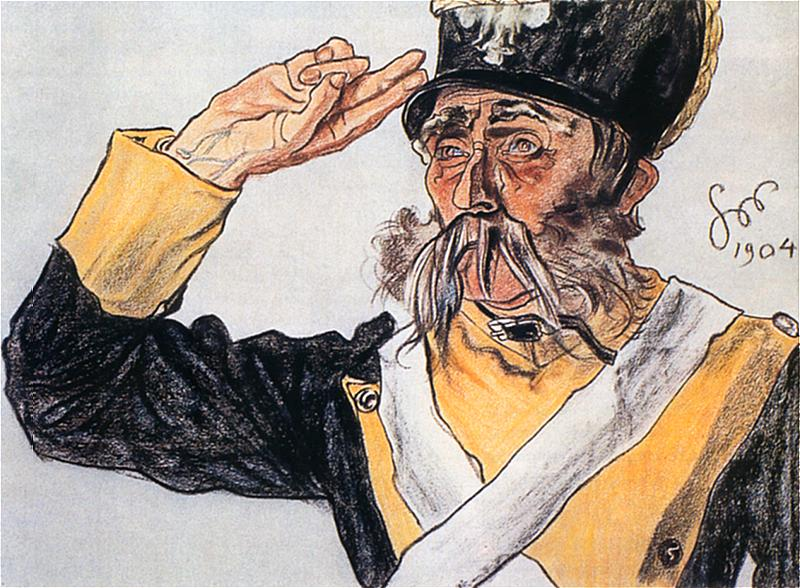
A two-fingers salute. Drawing by Stanisław Wyspiański, 1904.

The Polish two-finger salute is only used while wearing a headdress with the emblem of the Polish eagle (such as military hat rogatywka) or without this emblem (such as Boonie hat or helmet). The salute is performed with the middle and index fingers extended and touching each other, while the ring and little fingers are bent and touched by the thumb. The tips of the middle and index fingers touch the peak of the cap, the two fingers have been interpreted as honour and fatherland (Honor i Ojczyzna).

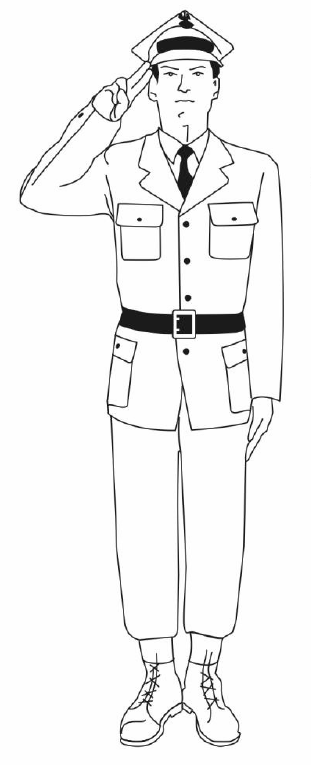
The salute as depicted in Polish military regulations

It is not clear when the two-fingers salute appeared in Polish military forces. Some see its origin in Tadeusz Kościuszko's 1794 oath. Others state that it came from Polish soldiers in the Congress Kingdom army around 1815 (partitioned Poland). At that time, the Tsar's Viceroy in Poland, Grand Duke Constantine, said that Poles would salute him with two fingers and use the other two to hold a stone to throw at him. Another legend attributes the salute to the remembrance of Battle of Olszynka Grochowska in 1831, when a soldier, who had lost in the battle all his fingers but the middle and index ones, saluted his superior with the wounded hand and died after it.

During the Second World War the salute was a subject of some controversy, as most of the Allied officers were unfamiliar with the gesture and saw it as disrespectful. Soldiers serving in the Polish Armed Forces in the West were ordered to use an open palm salute instead.

== Cub Scouting ==
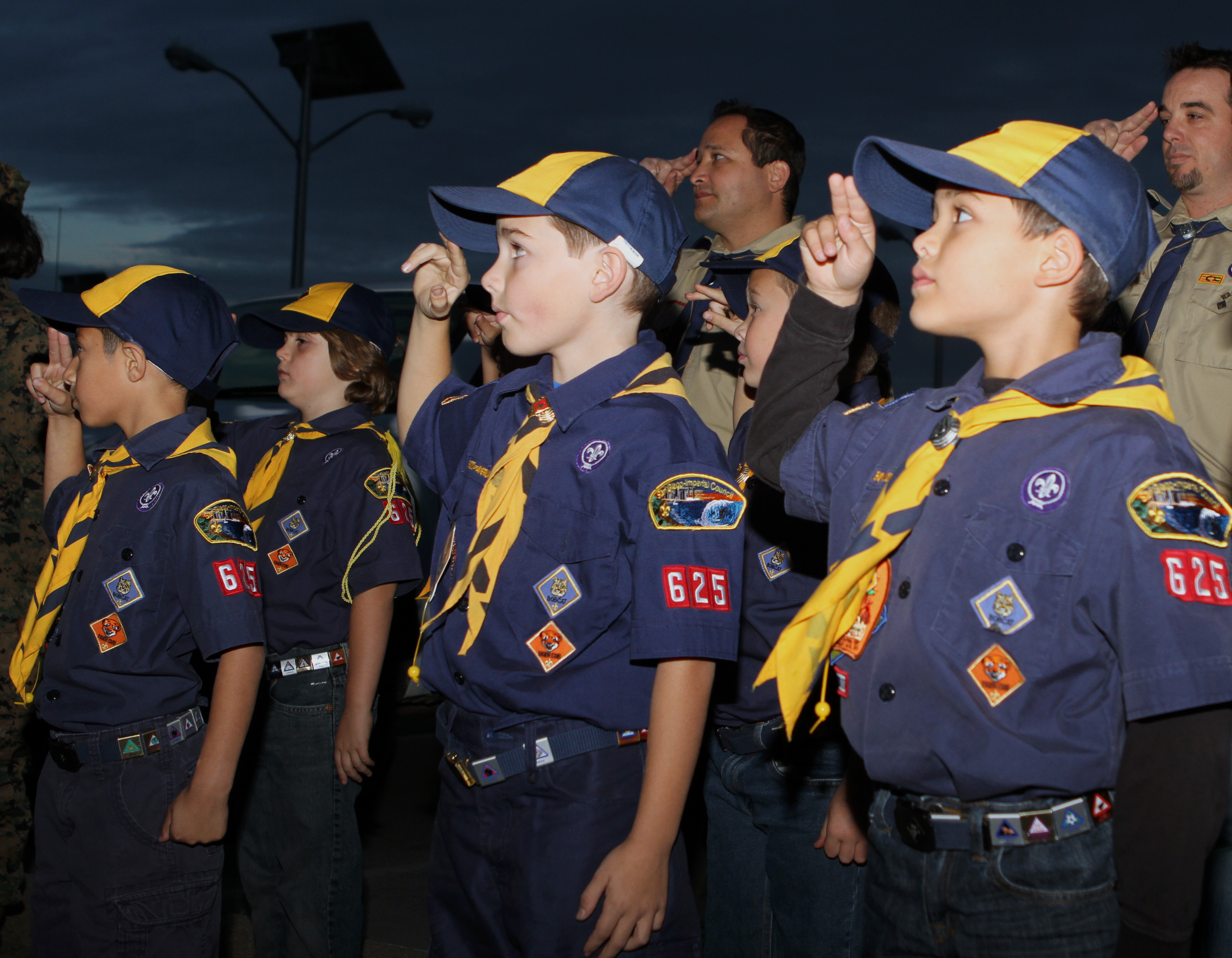
Cub Scouts of the Boy Scouts of America saluting

Many Cub Scout sections also use a two-finger salute. The salute was devised by Robert Baden-Powell and originally represented the two ears of a wolf cub, since the original programme was based on Rudyard Kipling's The Jungle Book. However, Cubs in several national associations now use the three-finger Scout salute used by the rest of the Scout Movement.
