= Vera Barclay =

British scouting pioneer and writer

Vera Charlesworth Barclay
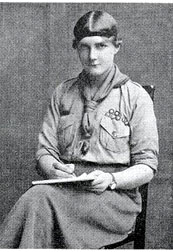
- Barclay in 1920
- Born: 10 November 1893; Hertford Heath, Hertfordshire
- Died: 19 September 1989 (aged 95); Sheringham, Norfolk
- Writing career
- Pen name: Margaret Beech, Vera Charlesworth, Hugh Chichester
- Genre: Children's literature
- Subjects: Scouting, Christianity
- Notable awards: Silver Wolf

Vera Charlesworth Barclay (10 November 1893 – 19 September 1989) was a British scouting pioneer and writer. She was an early exponent of female leadership in the Scout movement and played a leading role in the introduction of the Wolf Cub programme for younger boys, both in the United Kingdom and in France. Barclay wrote numerous children's stories and instructional Scouting handbooks, and in later life wrote about her Christian faith.

== Early life ==
Barclay was born on 10 November 1893, one of eight children of the Reverend Charles W. Barclay, a Church of England clergyman and his wife, Florence Louisa Charlesworth, a successful novelist - they were married in Stepney in Q1, 1881. The family lived in the village of Hertford Heath in Hertfordshire to the north of London, where Reverend Barclay was the vicar from 1881 to 1920. The family were frequent visitors to St Moritz in the Swiss Alps; Barclay was an enthusiastic tobogganist and one of the few females to tackle the Cresta Run, often dressed in skirts or riding jodhpurs.

== Scouting ==
Barclay joined the Scout movement and took charge of the village Boy Scout troop in 1912.

She later became involved in the newly formed Wolf Cubs. In 1913, the founder of the Scout movement, Robert Baden-Powell, had launched a provisional scheme for boys who were too young to join the Scouts at the age of 11 years. Originally called "Junior Scouts", it had been renamed "Wolf Cubs" by January 1914. Barclay was regularly pestered by younger village boys wanting to join the troop, so she opened the 1st Hertford Heath Wolf Cub Pack and persuaded her younger sister Angela to lead it. Barclay realised that there would be many women willing to run Cub packs and wrote an article entitled "How a Lady Can Train the Cubs"; it was published in the official Scout magazine, the Headquarters Gazette, in January 1915.

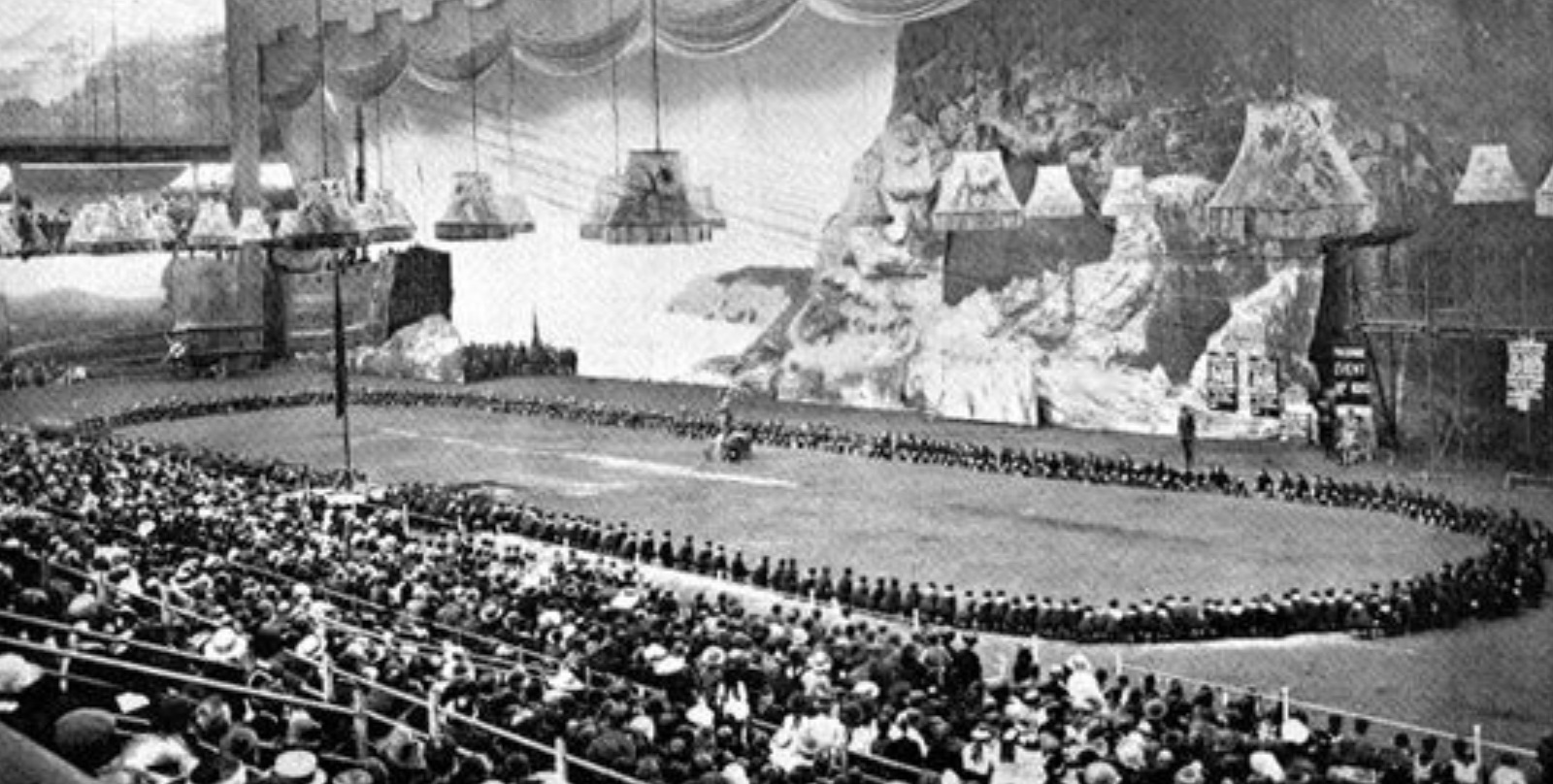
At the 1st World Scout Jamboree in 1920, 500 Wolf Cubs perform a Grand Howl in the arena at Olympia, London, organised by Vera Barclay.

In June 1916, Barclay attended a meeting of Wolf Cub leaders at the Scout Association Headquarters in London. The article had obviously caught Baden-Powell's attention, because he approached her to become the Wolf Cub Secretary at Imperial Headquarters. She accepted Baden-Powell's offer as her war work with the British Red Cross at a hospital in Netley in Hampshire was becoming impossible due to a pre-war knee injury incurred whilst skiing. One of her first tasks was to help Baden-Powell to edit the drafts for The Wolf Cub's Handbook, which was published in December 1916. She devised many of the tests and badges that appeared in this first edition. In 1920, she organised a Grand Howl by 500 Cubs at the 1st World Scout Jamboree at Olympia, London. She was presented with the Silver Wolf, the Scout movement's highest award for her services.

A recent convert to Roman Catholicism, Barclay spent a brief spell trying her vocation with the Daughters of Charity of St. Vincent de Paul. She later lived in Edgbaston in Birmingham, where she resumed her Scouting activities and was a leading member of the Catholic Scout Guild who ran a campsite at Hall Green for Cubs and Scouts from disadvantaged backgrounds.

In the early 1920s, Barclay was a frequent visitor to France, where she encouraged the development of Les Louveteaux or Wolf Cubs in the Scouts de France. In 1923, 1925 and 1927 she organised the first French Wolf Cub Wood Badge courses with Fr Jacques Sevin at the Château de Chamarande and was later awarded the Cross of St Louis by the Scouts de France. Her connection with Scouting ended in 1931, when she emigrated to France and then Switzerland.

== Writing ==
Barclay was a prolific author, mainly of books for children, but also about Christianity and Scouting. Perhaps her best known works are the "Jane" series of stories for girls. She wrote some books under the pen names Margaret Beech and Vera Charlesworth, and one detective story was written under the name of Hugh Chichester.

Barclay was a Catholic creationist who rejected evolution. She was also critical of theistic evolution. She authored Darwin Is Not for Children (1950) and Challenge to the Darwinians (1951). The former book was negatively reviewed in The Quarterly Review of Biology as an "illogical" anti-evolution work.

== Later life ==
Barclay returned to England before the start of World War II and lived in Felpham on the south coast from around 1938 and in 1939–1940 joined her brother, the Rev Cyril Charles Barclay (Vicar of Helmsley) with his wife Rose and daughter Mary-Rose, in a huge vicarage (now the North York Moors Trust) in the market town of Helmsley North Yorkshire, she started a small nursery school with her friend Ninette Hoffet which they ran in the vicarage, she later returned to The Midway, Felpham, long before the end of the war. After living in London and Seaview on the Isle of Wight where she began to lose her eyesight, she ended her days at Sheringham in Norfolk, being cared for by her niece Betty. She died on 19 September 1989 at St Nicholas' Nursing Home, Sheringham, and is buried in Sheringham Cemetery.

== Bibliography ==
- Danny the Detective: A Story for Wolf Cubs (1918)
- Danny again (1920)
- Cubbing: A Guide-book for Cub Masters (1920)
- The Mysterious Tramp (1921)
- Stories of the Saints by Candle-light (1922)
- Character Training in the Wolf Cub Pack (1923)
- Vie de Florence Barclay (1923)
- Jungle Wisdom (1925)
- The Book of Cub Games (1926)
- Potted Stories to Tell Scouts and Cubs (1926)
- Good Scouting: Notes on Scouting in the Catholic Parish (1927)
- Peter the Cub (1928, under the name of Margaret Beech)
- Peter and Veronica: Spring-time Lessons in an Old Garden (1928, Margaret Beech)
- Danny's Pack (1928)
- The Scout Way (1929)
- Saints of These Islands (1931)
- Saints by Firelight: Stories for Guides and Rangers (1931)
- Jeux pour Mowgli (1931)
- Danny and the Rattlesnakes: Yarns for Scouts and Cubs (1931)
- Camp Fire Yarns and Stunts (1932)
- Games for Camp and Club-Room (1932)
- Talks by Firelight (1932)
- Knave of Hearts (1933, Margaret Beech)
- Practical Psychology in Character Development (1934, with Rudolf Allers)
- Camp Fire Singing for Scouts and Guides (1934)
- Scout Discipline (1934)
- The Mystery of Mortimer's Wood (1934, Margaret Beech)
- Jane Versus Jonathan (1934)
- Peter and Veronica Growing Up: A Book for Readers of 15 to 17 (1935, Margaret Beech)
- Jane and Tommy Tomkins (1938)
- Saints and Adventures (1938)
- Gyp and the Pedlar's Ring (1938)
- The Mystery Man in the Tower (1938, under the name of Hugh Chichester)
- Joc, Colette and the Animals (1944)
- Jane Will You Behave (1944)
- Jane and the Pale Face (1945)
- L'homme de la tour (1946)
- They Met a Wizard (1947)
- Hier stimmt was nicht! : fünf Jungen, ein Schatz und ein Omnibus (1950, with others)
- They Found an Elephant (1950)
- Darwin is Not for Children (1950)
- Challenge to the Darwinians (1951)
- Morning Star and Other Poems (1951)
- The Face of a King (1955)
- The Holy Shroud: A Divine Message For Our Day – Through Photography (1956)
