= The Wolf Cub's Handbook =

1916 illustrated handbook on scout training

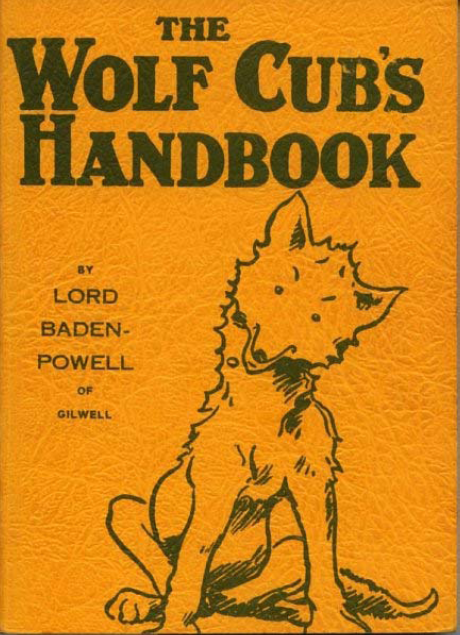
- Post-1929 edition cover
- Author: Robert Baden-Powell
- Illustrator: Robert Baden-Powell
- Language: English
- Genre: Children's literature
- Publisher: C. Arthur Pearson Limited, London
- Publication date: 1916
- Publication place: United Kingdom

The Wolf Cub's Handbook is an instructional handbook on Wolf Cubs training, published in various editions since December 1916. Early editions were written and illustrated by Robert Baden-Powell with later editions being extensively rewritten by others. The book has a theme based on Rudyard Kipling's The Jungle Book jungle setting and characters.

== Origins ==
In 1914, The Boy Scouts Association of the United Kingdom had Percy Everett prepare a programme for boys who were too young to be Boy Scouts (at about 11 years old). An outline of his "Junior Scouts" program was published in the Headquarters Gazette in 1914. However, Baden-Powell wanted something quite different from a watered-down Boy Scout program and recognised that too close an association between the junior program and the Boy Scouts would detract from both. Baden-Powell wanted a junior scheme with distinct name, uniform and other identity and program. In 1916, Baden-Powell published his own outlines for such a scheme, which was to be called Wolf Cubs. Baden-Powell retained elements of Everett's plan but gave it a theme by basing it on Rudyard Kipling's Jungle Book, which had been published in 1894 and was an established favourite with children. The Wolf Cubs scheme was given a publicity launch at The Boy Scouts Association's Imperial Headquarters in Buckingham Palace Road, Westminster, on Saturday 24 June 1916. Baden-Powell wrote a book for the scheme, The Wolf Cub's Handbook, which was published in December 1916.

The book included a précis of the Mowgli stories from the Jungle Book, and ceremonies and games based on them. Woven into this were instructional passages on health, fitness, camping, observation, knotting, semaphore, first aid, knitting and "being useful at home". The chapters are called "bites" because "this book is a meal offered by an old Wolf to the young Cubs".

The first edition did not contain details of badges or tests. In late 1916, Baden-Powell met Vera Barclay, a young Scouter from Hertfordshire who had written in the Headquarters Gazette about female leadership in the Scout Movement during wartime. Barclay accepted the offer of the post of Wolf Cub Secretary at The Boy Scouts Association Headquarters. Barclay and Baden-Powell devised the details of the Wolf Cub training program, badges and tests which were included in the second edition.

== Baden-Powell and Kipling ==
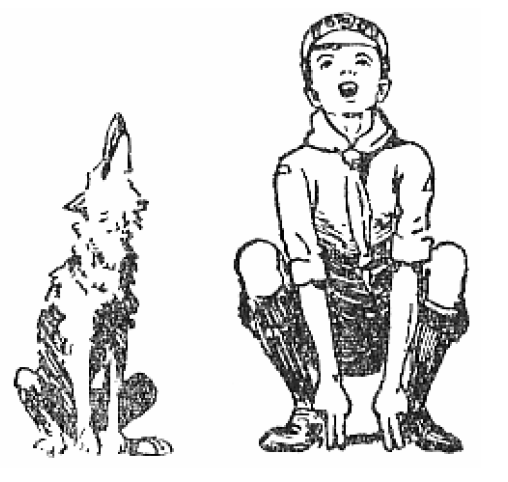
Baden-Powell's illustration in The Wolf Cub's Handbook (1916) showing how a Wolf Cub's squatting posture imitates a wolf at the Grand Howl, a ceremony based on The Jungle Book

Baden-Powell sent Kipling the proofs of the new book asking for permission to use The Jungle Book material on 28 July 1916, after the work had been sent to the publishers. Kipling returned them in agreement without making any revisions. Kipling and Baden-Powell had first met in India in the 1880s. Kipling would eventually be given the honorary title of Commissioner of Wolf Cubs

== Legacy ==
The Wolf Cub's Handbook was adopted as The Boy Scouts Association's official handbook for its Wolf Cubs program. Translations were made into a number of languages. The Boy Scouts of America obtained the rights for the book in the United States and published their own edition in 1918, although it did not officially adopt and operate a Cub Scouts program until 1930 under a modified program. The Wolf Cub's Handbook, in various editions, remained The Boy Scouts Association's official handbook for Wolf Cubs until The Chief Scout's Advance Party Report of 1966 recommended that less emphasis be placed on the Jungle Book theme and renamed its Wolf Cubs program as Cubs.

== See also ==
- Scouting for Boys
- The Jungle Book and Scouting
- Grand Howl
