= Cub Scout =

Program for children

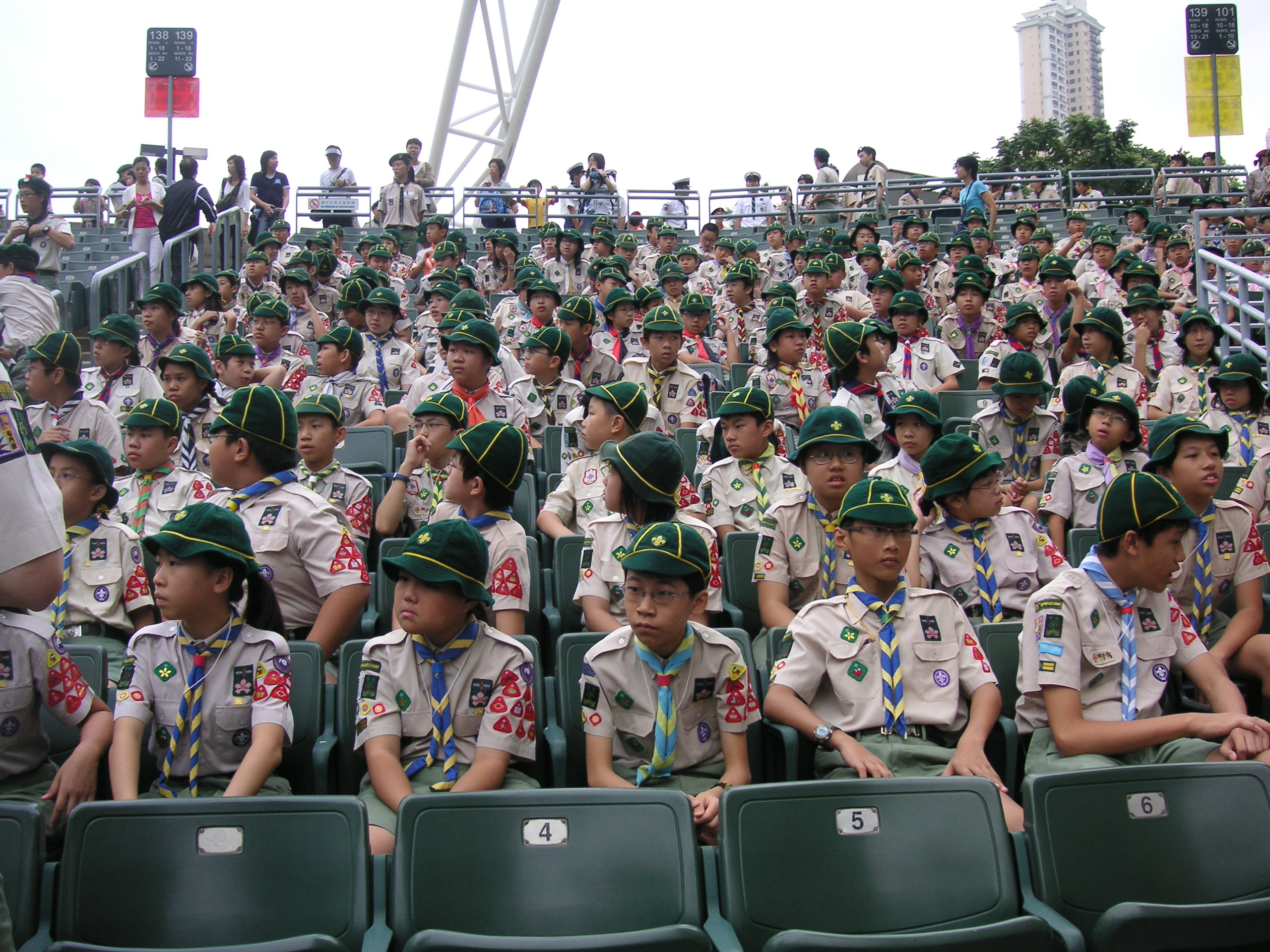
Hong Kong Cubs

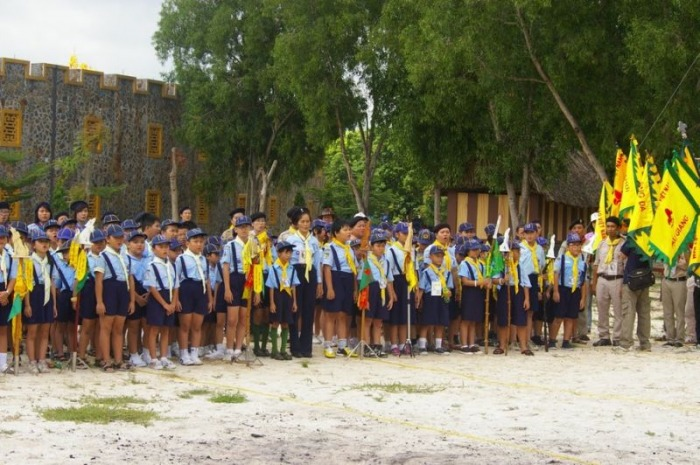
Vietnamese Cubs

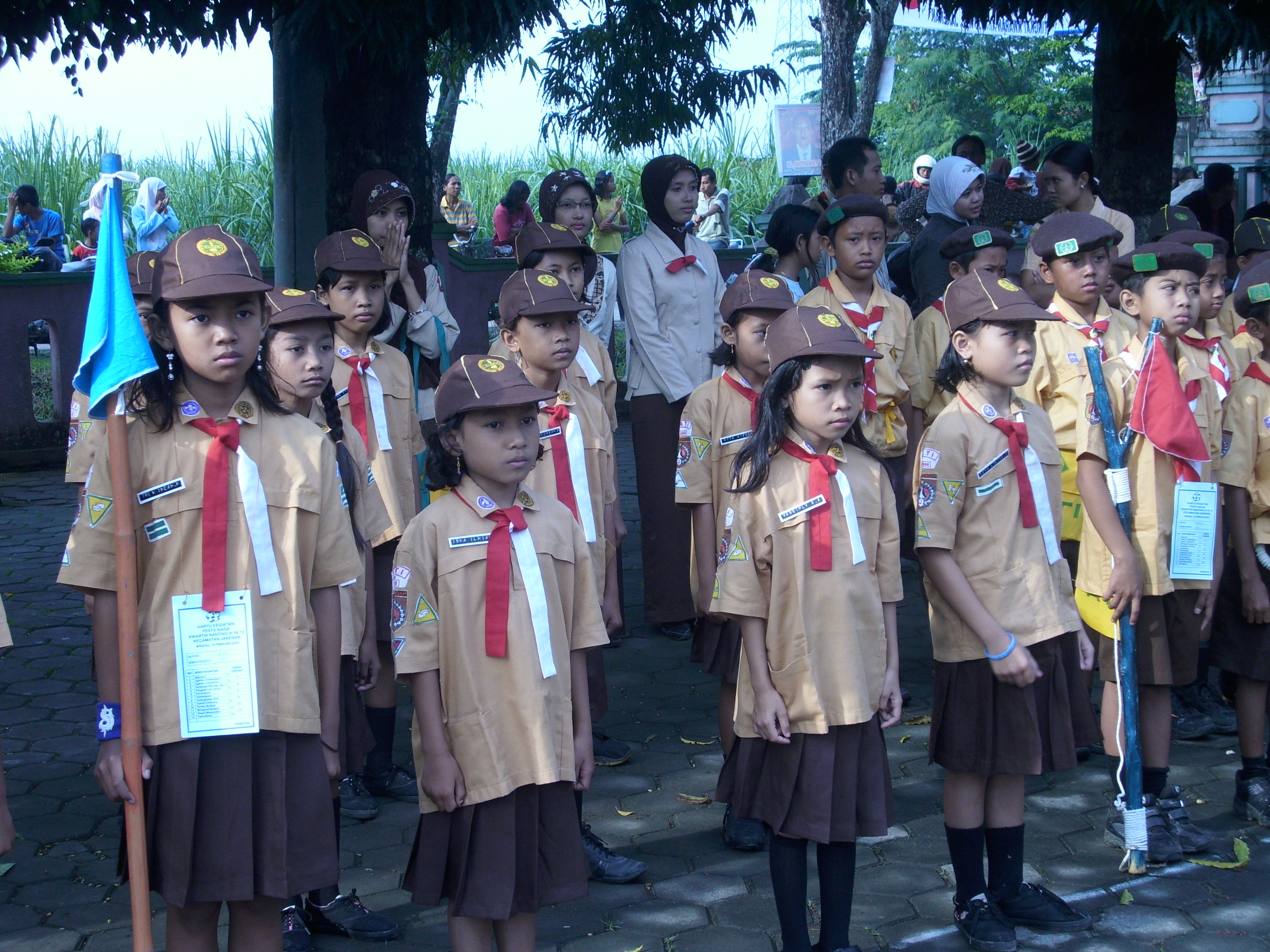
Indonesian Cubs

Cubs or Wolf Cubs are programmes associated with some Scout organisations, imitating some aspects of Scouts but for young children, usually between 8 and 12, who are too young to be Scouts and make the Scout Promise. A participant in the programme is called a Cub and a group of Cubs is called a "Pack".

The Wolf Cub programme was originated by The Scout Association in the United Kingdom in 1916 to provide a programme for boys who were too young to be Boy Scouts and make the Scout Promise. It was adopted by some other Scout organisations. Most Scout organisations, including The Scout Association, no longer use the Wolf Cub programme and have replaced it with other programmes but have retained the name Cubs. Others, including some Traditional Scouting organisations, maintain the original Wolf Cubs programme. However, some Scout organisations, such as some Traditional Scouting organisations, have never adopted programmes for younger children at all, typically on the grounds that they were not part of Robert Baden-Powell's original programme and his warnings against too close identification with juvenile programmes.

Originally, cubs programmes were open only to boys. Some Cub organisations are open to both girls and boys, although not necessarily in the same unit. A few organisations have operated a Sea Cub version of Cubs.

== Foundation ==
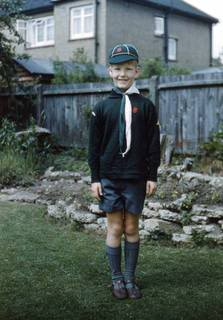
A British Wolf Cub in the late 1960s

Wolf Cubs was started by The Scout Association in 1916, nine years after the establishment of the Boy Scout Movement, to cater to younger boys who were too young to be Boy Scouts. During these first years, many troops had either allowed younger boys to join or had set up an informal junior or cadet Scout troops. In 1916, articles in a Scout leaders' journal, Headquarters Gazette outlined "Junior Scout" and then "Wolf Cub" schemes. However, Robert Baden-Powell wanted something quite different from a watered-down Boy Scout programme and recognised that too close an association between the junior programme and the Boy Scouts would detract from both. Baden-Powell wanted a junior scheme with a name, uniform and other identity and programme distinct from the Scouts.

In 1916, Baden-Powell published his outlines for such a scheme, it was to be called Wolf Cubs. Baden-Powell asked his friend Rudyard Kipling for the use of his Jungle Book history and universe as a motivational frame for the Wolf Cub scheme. The scheme was given a publicity launch at The Boy Scouts Association's Imperial Headquarters in Buckingham Palace Road, Westminster, on Saturday 24 June 1916. Baden-Powell wrote a new book, The Wolf Cub's Handbook, the first edition of which was published in December 1916. He collaborated with Vera Barclay in devising the Wolf Cub training programme and badges, which were published in the second edition. On 16 December 1916, a public display of the Wolf Cubs was held at Caxton Hall, Westminster, to which Kipling was invited; he was unable to attend but sent Baden-Powell a letter of apology, praising his work with the Scout Movement. Vera Barclay co-founded Wolf Cubs with Baden-Powell in 1916.

From the 1960s, many organisations varied or abandoned the Wolf Cub Jungle Book theme. Some organizations changed the name to Cubs, Cub Scouts or similar but retained the Jungle Stories and Cub ceremony as tradition—such as the use of Jungle Book names (as described below); and the Grand Howl which signals the start and end of Cub meetings. Other organizations kept the name but dropped the Jungle Book theme.

Originally, Cubs was open only to boys while the Brownies were set up as a parallel for young girls in Girl Guides organisations. This remains the situation in some places. Most World Organization of the Scout Movement (WOSM) member organisations admitted girls to Cubs while others have separate co-ed units with a different theme. Most International Union of the Guides and Scouts of Europe - Federation of Scouts of Europe (UIGSE) member organisations have two single-sex units both named Wolf Cubs and both in the jungle theme.

== Organisation ==
Cubs are organised in packs, which are sometimes linked to a Scout group, providing all the age programs known as a "Scouting family". Adult leaders of Cub packs take the names of The Jungle Book's main characters. In many countries the leader of the Pack is called Akela; subordinate leaders are named Bagheera, Baloo, Rikki-Tikki-Tavi, etc., by how many sub-leaders the pack has. A few very big packs need so many sub-leaders that their names must extend to include Tabaqui and Shere Khan, but that tends to be the cue for the pack to split into two packs. Cubs have a distinctive two-finger salute according to the Jungle theme, in contrast to the three-finger salute of the Boy Scouts. However, in The Scout Association of the United Kingdom (UK) and some of its overseas branches, the two-finger salute was later replaced by the three-finger salute. Historically, Cubs wear a distinctive headdress, which is a tight-fitting green felt cap with green felt visor, yellow pipings, and an emblem at the front—although in some countries this has been replaced by more contemporary headgear or dispensed with entirely.

Just as Scout troops are subdivided into patrols, Cub packs are divided into small teams. Baden-Powell named the team a Six, which refers to the six Cubs in each team. In most countries Sixes are mixed-age groups with the oldest as sixer ("leader"). In Scouting America, the teams are called dens, with each den serving either boys or girls in the same school grade.

Youths from older age programs are actively encouraged to assist as Cub leaders. In The Scout Association in the UK and in its branches such as in Australia, these were originally called Cub Instructors. Scouts Australia now uses the term Youth Helper for such persons, whilst in the United Kingdom they are called Young Leaders. In Canada, a Scout who assists in the Cub programme is designated as a Kim. In the United States, the term Den Chief is used.

In many European countries (especially where the Jungle theme still has a strong part in the programme), St. Francis of Assisi is the patron saint of Cubs, because of his relationship with wolves.

== Cubs in national organizations ==
=== Australia ===
==== Baden-Powell Scouts' Association ====
The Baden-Powell Scouts' Association in Australia operate a "Wolf Cub" programme between its Koalas' programme and Boy Scout. Wolf Cub packs are themed on "The Jungle Book" by Rudyard Kipling, a friend of Baden-Powell. Wolf Cub packs are divided into Sixes, with each six being identified by a coloured triangular patch on the shoulder of the Cub's shirt. Each Six is led by a "Sixer" and a "Seconder", who have their rank indicated by horizontal yellow stripes sewn onto their left arm.

==== Scouts Australia ====
In Scouts Australia, the Cubs program is open to all children (girls and boys) ages 8–11. The uniform is a navy blue, button-up or polo-style, short-sleeved shirt with a yellow collar, sleeves and shoulders. Patrols are identified by a coloured band/ring (red, yellow, green, orange, blue, black, white, grey, tan, purple) worn around their scarf, above their woggle. Patrol Leaders wear a second band/ring on the other side of their scarf which is white with two blue stripes. They are supported by their Assistant Patrol Leader, who will step into the leadership role if the Patrol Leader is away, and will help at Unit Councils. They wear a white band/ring with one blue stripe.

Together, the Patrol Leaders and Assistant Patrol Leaders from every patrol make up the Unit Council. They take a leading role in planning and running activities.

=== Austria ===
In Pfadfinder und Pfadfinderinnen Österreichs Cubs is the programme for children between the ages of 7 and 10. The jungle theme is the symbolic framework. The first pack was started in the autumn of 1920 in Vienna. In the beginning, there were different symbolic frameworks: red Indians (taken from "Kibbo Kift" written by John Hargrave) and Robinson Crusoe. In the 1930s the Jungle theme was introduced.

=== Canada ===
In 1916, the Wolf Cubs programme was introduced as part of Scouts Canada with a programme following that of its UK parent organisation, The Scout Association. Cubs is open to youth of both sexes, ages 8 to 10 inclusive. Sixes wear a coloured triangular patch, rather than a distinctive woggle. (If brown, for example, the six is known as Brown Six.) The Cub motto is "Do Your Best" and the promise, the vow recited in opening ceremonies is:

"I promise to do my best,
to do my duty to God and the King,
to keep the law of the Wolfcub pack,
and do a good turn every day."

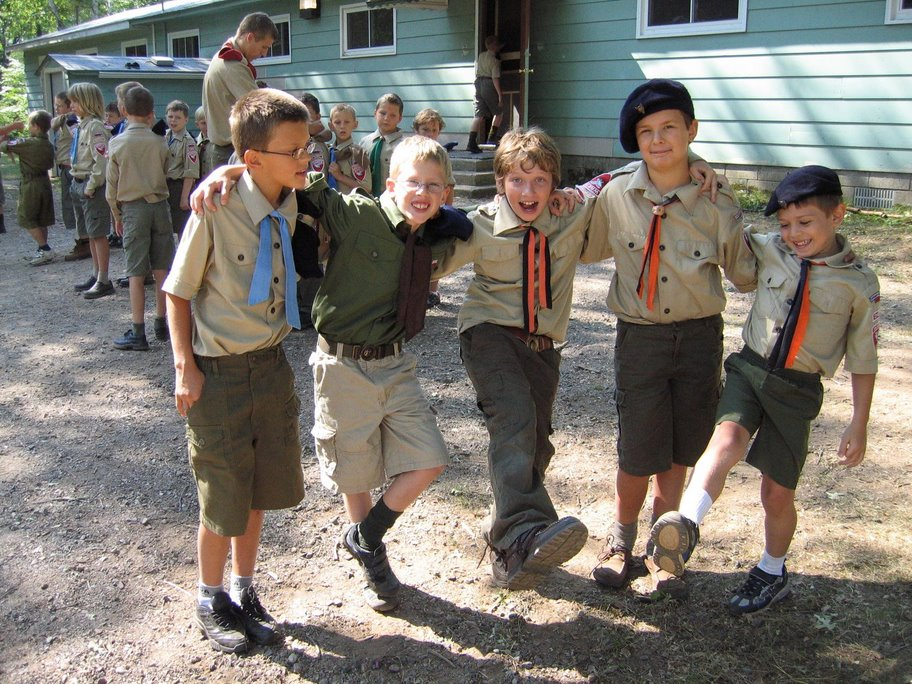
Cub Camp, Crivitz, Germany, 2007

=== Hong Kong ===
The tradition of Cubs in Hong Kong was inherited from the Hong Kong branch of The Scout Association of the United Kingdom. It is the largest programme of the Scout Movement in Hong Kong. A Pack is headed by a Cub Leader (團長), with several Assistant Cub Leaders (副團長) and Instructors (教練員). The division within a Pack is called a Six (小隊). Each Six has a Sixer (隊長) and a Seconder (隊副 or 副隊長). Each Six is distinguished by a colour and is named after it. Each Cub of the Six wears a woggle with the colour of his Six. The Promise and Law for Cubs are simplified. Traditionally, the logo of the Wolf Cub denotes the Cub but it is rarely used.

=== Ireland ===
In Ireland, the programme is known as both Cubs and Macaoimh, depending on the tradition from which the particular Scout troop comes.

=== Netherlands ===
The jungle theme is the symbolic framework of the Welpen (Cubs). Welpen wear green uniforms. Among a horde ("pack") of Cubs, the cubs are divided into nesten ("nests"). Each nest has a Gids (Guide) and a Helper. Like all age programmes, Welpen is open to both boys and girls, but Scout Groups can have single-sex units. Starting in 2010, the symbolic framework of the Welpen will be based on a modified version of the Jungle Book with two main characters: the boy Mowgli and the girl Shanti. The new Welpen programme will gradually replace the four programmes in the age group Scouting Nederland had before Welpen, Kabouters (Brownies), Dolfijnen ("Dolphins") and Esta's. Dolfijnen has a water-based symbolic framework, and Esta's has a specially developed co-ed symbolic framework. The new Welpen contains elements from all four previous age programmes.

=== New Zealand ===
In New Zealand, the Cubs programme largely follows that of the United Kingdom, though it is administered under the main Scouts New Zealand association. The Cubs programme is for children aged 8 to 11 years. They meet weekly at their Scout Hall and take part in all sorts of activities. There are approximately 410 scout groups in New Zealand, all of which have a cub programme, typically along with other programmes for younger kids (Keas) and older Scouts, Venturers and Rovers. Scouts New Zealand Sections.

=== Poland ===
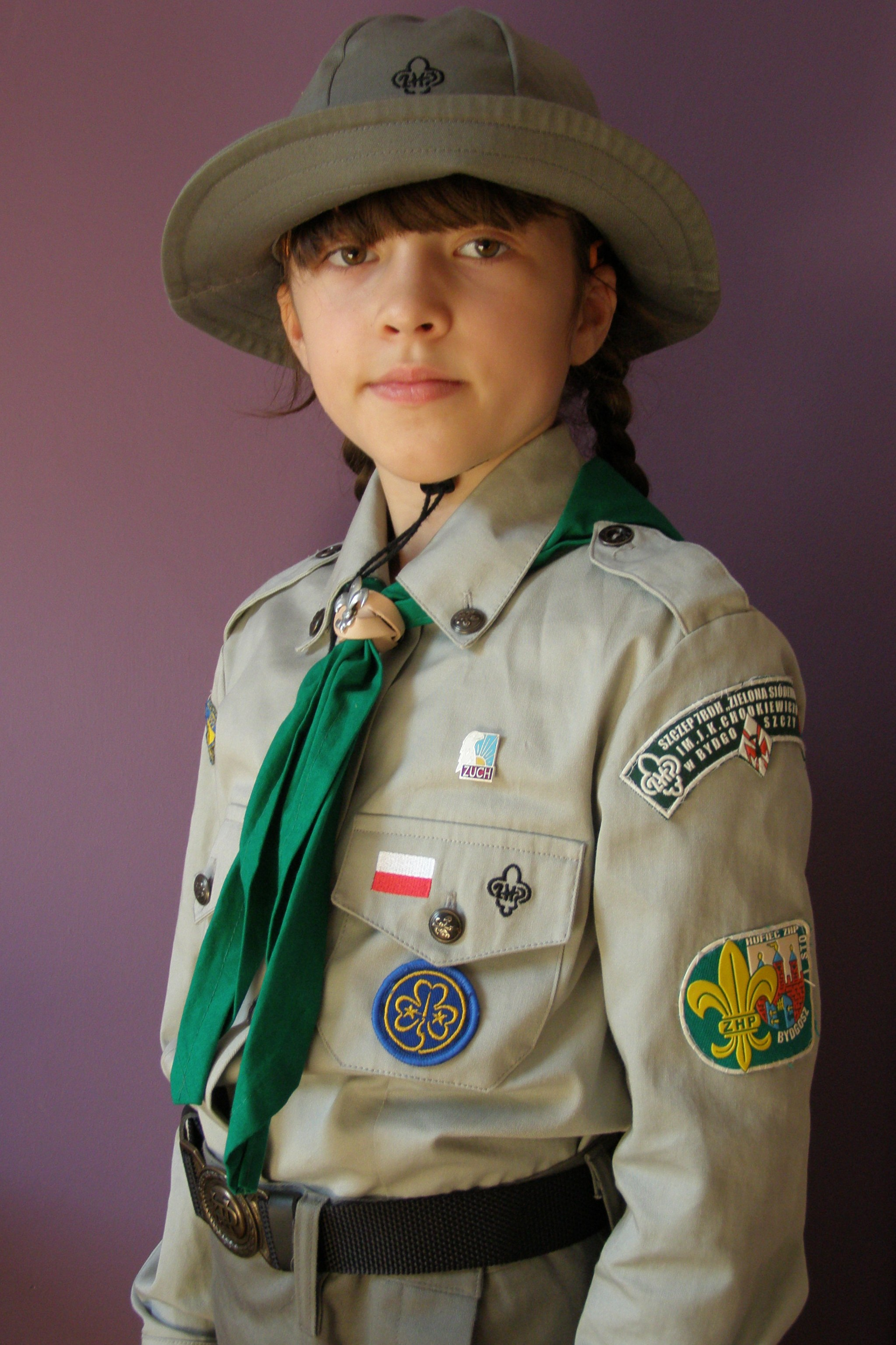
Cub from Poland, 2009

In the Polish Scouting and Guiding Association, Cubs and Brownies' programme is called "zuchy" and is open to children ages 6–10. Cubs are organised into packs where they learn to integrate into a collective of friends. Any kind of learning is accomplished by playing games. They can earn three Cub Stars "Gwiazdki zuchowe" and a lot of individual and group merit badges.

=== Singapore ===
In Singapore, the junior programme of the Singapore Scout Association was known as the Cadet Scouts (from a junior programme pre-dating Cubs) until 2005 when it was renamed to Cubs in line with international practise.

The Cubs' age range is from 7–12 and they use the Jungle Book Theme. Each Cub Pack is led by a Cub Leader assisted by Asst. Cub Leaders. Packs are subdivided into small groups of six cubs, called Sixes. Sixes are led by the Sixer and the Asst. Sixer. Most Cub Packs in Singapore are affiliated with schools and the teachers are the Cub Leaders and Asst. Cub Leaders. Some parents are also involved and actively serve as Volunteer Adult Leaders (VAL).

The highest award for a Cub was the Akela Award until 2025, when it was replaced with the Chief Scout Award (Cub). It is awarded to Cubs who complete the badge scheme and assessment criteria.

=== United Kingdom ===
==== Baden-Powell Scouts' Association ====
The Baden-Powell Scouts' Association operate a "Wolf Cub" programme between Beavers and Scouts. Wolf Cub packs are themed on "The Jungle Book" by Rudyard Kipling, a friend of Baden-Powell. Wolf Cub packs are divided into Sixes, with each six being identified by a coloured triangular patch on the shoulder of the Cub's sleeve. Each Six is led by a "Sixer" and a "Seconder", who have their rank indicated by horizontal yellow stripes sewn onto their left arm.

==== British Boy Scouts ====
The British Boy Scouts and British Girl Scouts Association allows the use of the Wolf Cubs programme as an alternative to its Junior Scout programme.

==== The Scout Association ====
In the Scout Association, Sixes are led by a "Sixer" and have a "Seconder" (or "Second") as a backup. The Sixer wears two stripes on his/her uniform and the Seconder one stripe. When a Cub is made a Sixer, the Second's badge (with one stripe) should be removed and replaced with the Sixer's badge. The Cubs of a six are distinguished by the colour of the woggle they wear on their Group neckerchief (known elsewhere as a Group scarf).

The three points of the fleur-de-lys, Scout salute and Scout sign remind the Cub of the three points of the Cub's Promise: "Duty to God and King, Helpfulness to other people, and Obedience to the Cub Law."

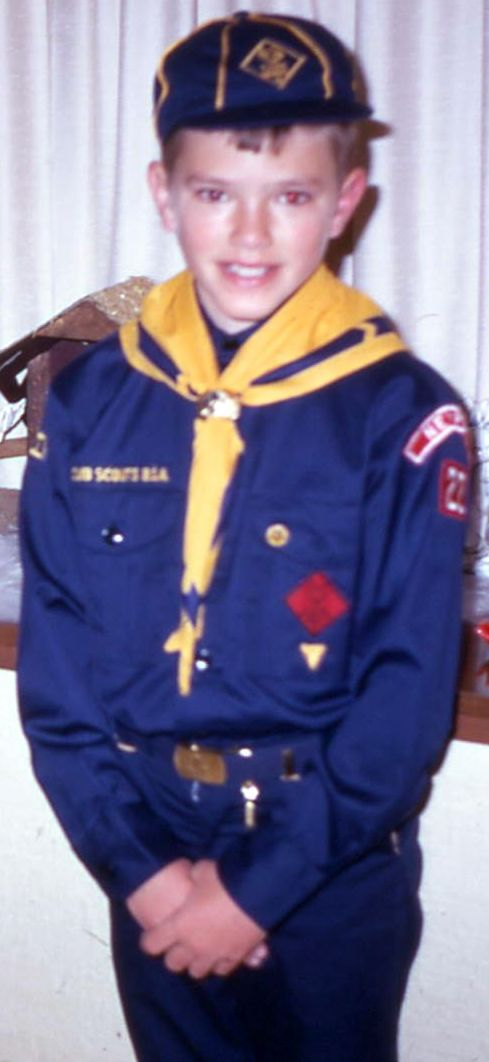
An American Cub in uniform, 1968

=== United States ===
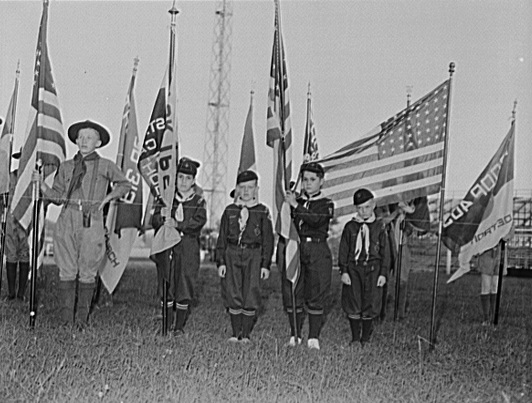
Detroit, U.S. Cubs around 1942

==== Scouting America ====
Cub Scouting is a division of Scouting America. Starting in 1918, several experiments operated until 1930, when the first official Cub packs were registered. Today, it is a family programme for children in kindergarten through fifth grade, with each den admitting boys, girls or coed through 4th grade and single gender for 5th grade. Parents, leaders, and organisations work together to achieve the purposes of Cubs. Families are a core part of Cubs and are included in many activities. Currently, Cubs is the largest of Scouting America's three divisions.

==== Baden-Powell Service Association ====
In the Baden-Powell Service Association, the corresponding programme for this age group is called Timberwolves. As with the Scout Association, each pack is divided into Sixes led by a "Sixer" with a "Seconder" assisting. The Pack retains Baden-Powell's original Jungle Book theme, with its leader called Akela and assistant leaders using names like Raksha, Bagheera, or Baloo.

== See also ==
- Little Octobrists – Analogous organization in the USSR
