= Air Scouts (The Scout Association) =

- The Logo of the Air Scout branch.
- Owner: The Scout Association
- Age range: 10½–14
- Headquarters: Gilwell Park
- Country: United Kingdom
Previous; Cub Scouts	Next; Explorer Air Scouts
- Website http://scouts.org.uk/scouts

Air Scout uniform

Air Scouts are a branch of The Scout Association in the United Kingdom dedicated to flying and aeronautical activities such as air navigation, identification, flying and gliding. The branch were first formed in 1941 although air activities had been a part of the Scout programme in the UK since 1911. They can be located anywhere but are usually located within easy transport distance of an airfield.

Air Scouts may be organised as Air Scout Groups, where there is an aeronautical focus for all sections offered by the group, or as individual Air Scout troops within a larger group that may not share the same focus. Younger members of an Air Scout group, in the Beaver Scout (6-8 years of age) and Cub Scout (8-10½ years of age) sections, follow the same programme and wear the same uniform as those in 'Land Scouts' as the Air Scouts specialism only begins at age 10. However members in Air Scout troops (10½-14 years of age) and Air Explorer units (14-18 years of age) wear a different uniform and follow a more aeronautical focus within the current Scout programme.

== History ==
=== Inception and launch ===
The Air Scout branch of the Scouts began officially on 31 January 1941 following approval by the council to provide an opportunity to develop aeronautical skills. This built on the earlier programme opportunities that existed before this.

The first programme opportunity for aeronautical interest was through the Airman's badge launched in 1911 just three years after the first powered flight in Britain which involved theoretical knowledge, making a model aeroplane and fly it. The first UK Scout Group known to have built and flown their own glider were East Grinstead who flew for 200 feet at an altitude of 25 feet, in 1912. The first powered aircraft to be owned by UK Scouts was an Airco DH.6 presented to 3rd Hampton (Middlesex) Scouts in 1921. With the advent of flying in war in 1917 a scheme was added to help Scouts learn the basics of aeronautical engineering. As the popularity soared in the 1920s some unofficial Air Scout patrols met but calls in 1927 for an Air Scout branch came to nothing. However, as popularity continued to increase troops with access to air fields were encouraged to try out activities and an 'Air Patrols' leaflet was published in the 1930s.

By 1941 however the outbreak of the Second World War provided the much needed boost to the movement and created the incentive to found the Air Scouts branch. A number of high-profile events and camps were held to promote the new branch and its link with the Royal Air Force, which benefitted the fledgling RAF as it provided young people with the technical knowledge about aircraft for those who were too young to join the Air Training Corps. The first National Air Scout camp took place in Avington Park in July 1942 and in December 1942 a National Air Scout exhibition was held in Dorland Hall, London. 1944 marked the numerical peak of the branch and although numbers began to fall, enthusiasm and imagination continued unabated.

=== Post-war ===
After the conclusion of the Second World War demand for Air Scouts began to fall but enthusiasm remained high so the Scouts wanted to maintain support from the wider Air Ministry so the Recognition scheme was introduced in October 1950. As well as being prestigious to be recognised it also granted much needed access to facilities to deliver an exciting programme and while it took some time for troops to qualify for recognition by 1955 nearly 40 troops had gained recognition. 1955 also saw the introduction of Scout gliding courses at Lasham near Alton in Hampshire and four years later the Scouts bought their first two-seater glider which could be used for activities. Lasham was maintained as an Air Activity Centre however demand for the facilities for other flying purposes made it less suitable for Air Scouts and so the centre closed in March 1980.

Notable headquarters commissioners for Air Scouts include J.G.W. Weston and Bernard Chacksfield.

=== Modern day ===
Air activities continue to be a part of the Scout programme and since the programme refresh in 2015 Air Activities have been more accessible to any youth member of Scouting when the Air Activities Staged Activity badge was added so that any member could gain the skills. The following year, 2016, was marked as the 75th birthday of the Air Scout branch and was marked with a National Air Scout Camp in Cornwall attended by 300 of the 2,000 Air Scouts and took part in glider and aircraft simulator flying, paragliding behind a vehicle, tours of the operational areas of the regional airport and other adventurous activities including climbing, shooting and caving. As of 2019 there are 65 Air Scout groups in the UK.

== Organization ==
As a branch of the Scout Association, Air Scouts and Explorer Air Scouts share much of the organisational structure of their sister sections. Members of both make the same promise as any other Scout or Explorer Scout and take part in the same wider programme based on the themes of Outdoor and Adventure, World and Skills, although the aeronautical elements of this programme tend to be the focus of activities especially in the summer months when the weather is fine enough for gliding and air based activities. The sections are led by volunteer leaders as part of a team made up of uniformed leaders, assistant leaders and more informal sectional assistants and parent helpers. Due to the technical nature of the activities and the specialised instruction required, Air Scout groups and sections may have more skills instructors than other groups and sections to enable the air-based programme to occur.

Unlike the Sea Scout branch which has existed so long that many groups established as Sea Scout Groups, very few groups have been Air Scout Groups since their formation. Instead, many change to an Air Scout Group when they gain a leader who is interested in air activities and will therefore run these with the troop. If a Group in which the only Scout troop becomes an Air Scout Troop then the entire group may adopt the title of Air Scout Group; otherwise a group can decide to become an Air Scout Group, and change their uniform accordingly, if air activities play a major part of the programme in the sections.

The Air Scout section is run at a local level by Scout Groups which may nor may not specialise as an Air Scout group. They are led locally by a volunteer manager, called a Group Scout Leader, and are responsible for ensuring the standards of the section are maintained. It is usual for the Air Scout section to be divided into patrols of young people led by a Patrol Leader, usually a more experienced member of the section. It is possible to have an Air Scout troop in the same group as land Scout troops or Sea Scout troops and it is even possible for one patrol of a troop to have an air scouts speciality.

=== Royal Air Force Recognition ===
As of 2019 there are 65 Air Scout Groups in the United Kingdom of which up to 60 can be officially recognised by the Royal Air Force. The scheme, which is administered jointly by headquarters of the Scout Association at Gilwell Park and Headquarters, Air Cadets at RAF Cranwell, requires sections or groups to pass an inspection to meet the appropriate standard. Upon passing this standard, the group or section are issued with a certificate of recognition by the Commandant Air Cadets.

Air Scouts that are part of a recognised group are entitled to wear a special insignia, an RAF roundel with a Scout fleur-de-lis in the centre, visit and camp at RAF stations, have air experience flights in service aircraft, attend Air Training Corps units to receive instructions and lectures, use ATC equipment and borrow RAF equipment temporarily to train Air Scouts.

== Visual identity ==
=== Uniform ===
The uniform for Air Scout troops is a modified version of the Scout uniform. Members of a Beaver Scout colony or Cub Scout pack in an Air Scout Group do not wear a special uniform and instead wear the uniform common to all members of the section.

The uniform for Air Scouts consists of a light blue long sleeve shirt or blouse, smart navy blue trousers or skirt, a leather scout belt and buckle, Scout Group scarf and a beret with an Air Scout badge sewn on. Groups may optionally also choose to adopt navy blue shorts, activity trousers or outer jacket, grey fleece. A navy blue sweatshirt and baseball cap are optionally available for activity wear. The uniform for leaders in a Sea Scout group is identical however leaders have the option of a navy blue tie as a formal option for their uniform. For Air Scouts and leaders they also wear an identifying badge on their uniform above the left chest to help identify them as Air Scouts, as the shirt is the same colour as those used for Sea Scouts.

=== Flag ===
In addition to any flags that may be flown as part of normal identification purposes, Air Scout troops will also have a flag that identifies their section for use in parades and when investing a new member to the troop. Air Scout troop flags are the same size as other Scout flags (4ft by 3ft) and are light blue with the name of the group name and location in yellow lettering around a white Scout arrowhead on a purple circle in the centre of the flag.

=== Logo ===
Since 2009, the Air Scout branch does not use a specific logo of their own, instead using a version of the main Scout Association corporate logo with Air Scouts placed underneath. Their message is the same as the other sections in Scouting, focusing between 2009 and 2018 on Everyday Adventure, and since 2018 on Skills for Life with appropriate images to show this. The section uses the blue colour palette more than other sections and before 2018 used cloud artwork in the background of publications and posters and today may use Navy blue for publications more than the Scout purple used by others.

== Explorer Air Scouts ==
Explorer Air Scouts
- Logo for the section.
- Owner: The Scout Association
- Age range: 14–18
- Headquarters: Gilwell Park
- Country: United Kingdom
- Founded: February 2002
Previous; Air Scouts	Next; Scout Network
- Website http://scouts.org.uk/explorers

Air Scout uniform

Explorer Air Scouts are the section for 14-18 year olds that follow the Air Scouting approach to Scouting within the Scout programme. They are able to complete the same activities and badges as other Explorer Scouts but often have an aeronautical themed programme.

=== Organisation ===
An Air Explorer Scout section is run at a higher level than an Air Scout troop, being run by Scout Districts which run a number of Explorer Scout units. Individual units are led by a volunteer leadership team, as with other younger sections, and are supported by a volunteer manager at district level, the District Explorer Scout Commissioner. Explorer Scout Units in general may form links with a particular group through the forming of a partnership agreement and indeed many Air Explorer Scout Units are partnered to groups that have Air Scout troops or are Air Scout groups as a whole.

=== Uniform ===
The uniform for Explorer Air Scouts and leaders consists of a light blue long sleeve shirt or blouse, smart navy blue trousers or skirt, a leather scout belt and buckle, Scout Group scarf or navy blue tie and a beret with an Air Scout badge sewn on. Units may choose to adopt navy blue shorts, activity trousers or outer jacket or a grey fleece as part of their official uniform. A navy blue sweatshirt and baseball cap are optionally available for activity wear. For Air Scouts and leaders they also wear an identifying badge on their uniform above the left chest to help identify them as Air Scouts, as the shirt is the same colour as those used for Sea Scouts.

=== Flags ===
Similar to Air Scout troops, Explorer Air Scouts use a flag that identifies their section for use in parades and when investing a new member to the troop. The design is exactly the same as that of Air Scout troops being a 4ft by 3ft light blue flag with the name of the group name and location in yellow lettering around a white Scout arrowhead on a purple circle in the centre of the flag.

== Aircraft owned by UK Scouts ==
A number of aircraft are owned by Scouts in the United Kingdom, including:

- Slingsby Falke G-AYYK, owned Scout Association, and used at Lasham airfield
- Scheibe Falke, G-BODU – owned by Hertfordshire Scouts, in use at Cambridge Gliding Centre
- Pegasus Quik GT450 G-CFFN, owned by Kent County Scout Council since 2008.
- Thunder Ax7-77 Hot air balloon G-BCAS, owned Scout Association 1979 to 1981.
- Cameron O-84 Hot air balloon G-STAV, owned by Blenheim Scout Group since 2009.

== See also ==
- Air Scout
- The Scout Association - The parent organisation of the section.
- Age Groups in Scouting and Guiding
- Scouts (The Scout Association)
- Explorer Scouts (The Scout Association)
- Sea Scouts (The Scout Association) - Variation based on water activities, includes Sea Explorer Scouts.
