= Royal Navy Recognised Sea Scouts =

The defaced ensign flown by RN Affiliated Sea Scout Groups

There are 105 Sea Scout Groups in the United Kingdom and one group in Gibraltar who are affiliated to the Royal Navy in order to foster a close relationship between the Royal Navy and young people in the Scout Association by making naval facilities and equipment accessible. It is seen as a mark of great honour by the Groups holding RN Recognition.

== History ==
Sea Scouting in the U.K. began in 1908, one year after the establishment of Scouting itself. During World War I Sea Scouts performed duties as coastal lookouts and messengers and, in recognition of these deeds, were formally recognised by the Admiralty Board in 1919, this allowed them access to Naval equipment and facilities whilst still remaining independent of any Naval control.

During World War II the scheme was converted so that Sea Scout groups who show themselves able to reach certain levels of proficiency could apply for stores and grants to help train young men in basic seamanship before entering military service. The scheme has been running since then, overseen by Second Sea Lord / Commander-in-Chief Naval Home Command and regulated by a Memorandum of Agreement (MOA) between the Ministry of Defence (MoD) and the Scout Association.

Although there are some 425-450 Sea Scout groups throughout the U.K., the MoD recognises a maximum of 105. In order to remain in the scheme groups they must maintain high standards. Any Sea Scout group can apply for recognition subject to certain criteria laid down in the MOA.

Unlike the Sea Cadet Corps, Sea Scouts are not financially supported by the MoD, apart from an annual capitation grant to the Scout Association. The driving force behind groups applying for and remaining in the Royal Naval recognition scheme is the kudos and associated pride.

== Privileges ==
The Admiralty Pennant also worn by RN Affiliated Sea Scout Groups

There are a number of privileges afforded to Groups that make it into the 105, including:

- Leaders, Explorers, Scouts and Cubs wear Royal Navy Recognition Badge.
- Group wears defaced Red Ensign and flies Admiralty Pennant.
- Eligible to attend Big Four Events:
  - Summer Camp, HMS BRISTOL, Portsmouth.
  - Soccer Sixes, HMS BRISTOL, Portsmouth.
  - Swimming Gala, HMS RALEIGH, Plymouth.
  - Explorer Camp, HMS BRISTOL, Portsmouth.
- Eligible to utilise HMS BRISTOL's facilities and RN Sailing Centre Assets.
- Visit Portsmouth Heritage area attractions at heavily discounted rates.
- Annual payment to the Scout Association (Admiralty Fund) based on a per capita payment for each Scout and Explorer Scout plus an allowance for certain badges as detailed in the Memorandum of Agreement.
- Eligible to apply for grants from Scout Association for purchase of equipment and boats.
- On joining an initial Stores outfit is issued.

== Inspection ==
Groups are inspected every 18 months - 2 years by an RN Officer, This is a formal inspection, usually alternating between water-borne and land based, where the Groups can show off their skills and worthiness to be recognised by the RN.

== Recognised groups ==
RN Number	Group	Website
01	4th Gillingham (Rainham) Sea Scouts	http://www.4thgillingham.co.uk/
02	3rd Portchester Sea Scouts	http://www.3rdportchester.uk/
03	1st Oulton Broad Sea Scouts	http://1stoultonbroadseascouts.org/
04	13th Ipswich Sea Scouts	http://www.13thipswich.co.uk/
05	4th Epping Forest South Sea Scouts	http://www.4thefsscouts.org.uk
06	Newbold-on-Stour Sea Scouts	
07	Guernsey Sea Scouts	
08	3rd Wallsall Sea Scouts	http://www.killock.co.uk/
09	2nd Cowes Sea Scouts	http://www.isleofwight-scouts.org.uk/Groups/WestWight/Cowes/Overview.aspx
10	1st Batchworth Sea Scouts	http://www.batchworth.org/
11	1st Lytham St Annes Sea Scouts	http://www.1stlsa.co.uk/
12	15th Macclesfield Sea Scouts	
13	5th Barry Sea Scouts	http://www.5thbarryseascouts.org.uk/
14	2nd Warwick Sea Scouts	http://2wk.org.uk/
15	2nd Whitstable	
16	36th Epping Forest (South) Sea Scouts	http://www.36efsscouts.org.uk/
17	18th Inverness Sea Scouts	http://www.invernessseascouts.org.uk/
18	4th Dovercourt Sea Scouts	
19	1st West Bay Sea Scouts	
20	4th/6th Leigh-on-Sea Sea Scouts	http://www.4th6thleigh.org/
21	8th Faversham Sea Scouts	
22	4th New Forest East (Hythe)	http://www.hytheseascouts.org.uk
23	3rd/5th Lancing Sea Scouts	http://www.3rd5thlancingseascouts.org.uk/
24	1st Hertford Sea Scouts	http://www.hertfordscoutsappeal.org.uk/
25	25th Southampton Sea Scouts	http://www.25th-southampton.org.uk/
26	8th Norwich Sea Scouts	https://8nss.org.uk/
27	64th Birkenhead Sea Scouts	http://www.birkenheadseascouts.org.uk/
28	2nd Abingdon Sea Scout Group	https://2ndabingdon.co.uk/
29	6th Torbay Britannia Sea Scouts	http://www.6thTorbayBritannia.org.uk
30	Leander (Kingston) Sea Scouts	http://www.leanderseascouts.co.uk/
31	14th Tonbridge Sea Scouts	http://14thtonbridge.org/default.aspx
32	3rd South Shields Sea Scouts	http://www.3rdscouts.org//
33	3rd Shoreham Sea Scouts	
34	9th Stafford Sea Scouts	http://www.staffordseascouts.org.uk/
35	3rd Frodsham Sea Scouts	http://www.cheshire-scouts.org.uk/index.php?option=com_uhp2&task=viewpage&Itemid=9999999&user_id=1422
36	1st Kings Norton Sea Scouts	http://1stkingsnorton.org.uk/
37	1st Blackfords	
38	11th Torbay Sea Scouts	http://www.11thtorbay.co.uk/
39	4th Streatham Sea Scouts (Princess Marie Louise's Own)	http://the4thstreatham.net/
40	3rd Bingley Sea Scouts	https://sites.google.com/site/3rdbingley/
41	1st Avoch	
42	10th Christchurch Sea Scouts	
43	1st Corsham Sea Scouts	http://www.corshamscouts.org.uk/
44	4th Heswall Sea Scouts	https://www.4thheswallseascouts.org.uk/
45	1st Lilliput Sea Scouts	http://www.lilliputseascouts.co.uk
46	2nd Beeston Sea Scouts	https://www.2ndbeeston.org.uk/
47	35th Bournemouth Sea Scouts	
48	1st Southbourne Sea Scouts	
49	Currently Vacant	
50	Holy Trinity (Margate) Sea Scouts	http://www.rn50.org.uk/
51	1st Felpham Sea Scouts	
52	17th Colchester Sea Scouts	
53	6th Itchen (Hamble) Sea Scouts	http://www.hambleseascouts.org.uk/
54	12th Halifax Sea Scouts	
55	1st St Peter in Thanet	http://www.1ststpetersseascouts.co.uk/
56	Petersham & Ham Sea Scouts	http://www.pandhseascouts.org.uk/
57	1st Clifton Sea Scouts	http://www.yorkseascouts.org.uk/
58	1st/10th Sutton Coldfield Sea Scouts (Indomitable)	http://www.suttonseascouts.org.uk
59	8th Worthing Sea Scouts	http://www.8thworthing.org.uk/
60	4th Thames Ditton (Ajax) Sea Scouts	http://www.ajax.org.uk/
61	2nd Durrington Sea Scouts	http://www.2nddurrington.org.uk/
62	9th New Forest South (Lymington) Sea Scouts	
63	1st Watchet Sea Scouts	http://www.watchetseascoutgroup.org.uk/
64	19th Exeter Sea Scouts	
65	1st Bungay Sea Scouts	
66	21st Sunderland Sea Scouts	
67	6th Ramsgate Sea Scouts	http://www.6thramsgate.org.uk
68	1st Blofield & Brundall Sea Scouts	http://www.1stblofieldandbrundall.org.uk/
69	1st Luton Sea Scouts	
70	11th Norwich Sea Scouts	http://11thnorwich.ukscouts.org.uk/
71	1st Thorpe St Andrew Sea Scouts	http://www.firstthorpescouts.org.uk
72	1st Surbiton (Sealion) Sea Scouts	http://sealionscouts.org.uk/
73	3rd Chalkwell Bay Sea Scouts	http://www.3rdcb.org.uk/
74	1st Molesey (Jaguar) Sea Scouts	http://www.jaguarseascouts.org.uk/
75	4th Knowle Sea Scout Group	http://www.4thknowleseascouts.org.uk/
76	2nd Deal Sea Scouts	http://2nddealseascouts.org/
77	1st Cleethorpes Sea Scouts	
78	30th Norwich Sea Scouts	
79	1st Cogenhoe Sea Scouts	
80	1st Park Gate Sea Scouts	
81	Dartford Cambria Sea Scouts	http://www.CambriaSeaScouts.org/
82	5th Gosport Sea Scouts	http://www.5thgosportseascouts.org.uk/
83	1st Reading Sea Scouts	
84	3rd Poole Sea Scouts	https://www.3rdpoole.org.uk/
85	17th Sutton Coldfield Sea Scouts	
86	33rd Lancaster Sea Scouts	
87	1st Barry Sea Scouts	
88	1st Warsash Sea Scout Group	
89	9th Itchen Sea Scouts	https://www.9thitchenseascouts.org/
90	29th Glasgow Sea Scouts	http://www.29thglasgow.org.uk/new
91	6th Newark Sea Scouts	
92	2nd Fareham Sea Scouts	http://2ndfareham.org/
93	5th Woodbridge Sea Scouts	
94	15th Long Eaton Sea Scouts	
95	1st Cuddington Sea Scouts	http://www.warspite.org.uk/
96	4th Canvey Island Sea Scouts	http://www.4ci.org.uk/about/rn-recognition/
97	6th Barry Sea Scouts	https://www.cardiffandvalescouts.org.uk/6th-barry-sea-scouts/
98	1st Standlake & Cokethorpe	http://group.rn98.co.uk/
99	4th New Forest North Sea Scouts	http://www.elingseascouts.org.uk/
100	6th Falmouth Sea Scouts	http://www.6thfalmouth.org.uk/
101	5th Gibraltar Sea Scouts	http://gibseascouts.terapad.com/
102	33rd Oxford (Kidlington) Sea Scouts	http://www.kidlingtonseascouts.org.uk/
103	1st Hampton Hill Sea Scouts (Achilles)	http://www.hamptonseascouts.org/
104	Hydra ESSU	
105	31st Itchen (Amazon)	https://amazonseascouts.org.uk/

== See also ==
- Sea Scouts (The Scout Association)
- Sea Scouts
- Scouts
- Royal Navy
