= Scouts (The Scout Association) =

Division of youth organization

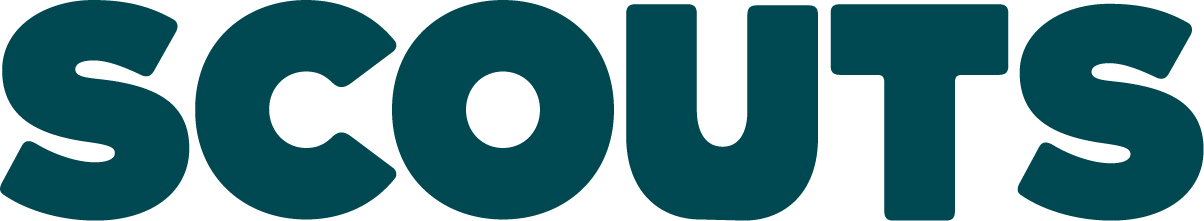
- Owner: The Scout Association
- Age range: 10½-14
- Headquarters: Gilwell Park, London
- Country: United Kingdom
- Founded: First event 1907; Formalised 1908.
- Membership: 126,133 young people (January 2023)
Previous; Cub Scouts	Next; Explorer Scouts

Scout section uniform

Scouts, often referred to as the Scout section to differentiate itself from the wider movement and its parent organisation, is a section of Scouting run by The Scout Association for ten and a half to fourteen year old young people. The section follows on from Cub Scouts (8-10½ year olds) and precedes Explorer Scouts (14-18 year olds). Since 1991, the section has been coeducational and today the Scout section accepts young people from all backgrounds, faiths and genders.

The Scout section is run locally by Scout groups and is led by a team of volunteer youth leaders. In addition to the general programme of outdoor and adventurous activities, learning new skills and connecting with the world and local community some Scout troops specialise to follow the Sea Scout and Air Scout training programmes to develop a more nautical or aeronautical feel to their troops.

It is a direct descendant of the original Boy Scout patrols and troops formed following the introduction of a Scouting programme in 1908 making it the oldest Scouting section in the world. The early section programme was based heavily on Scouting for Boys, published in 1908, and the regular resources and manuals that followed and received no major change until the publication of the Advanced Party Report in 1966 which saw controversial changes to the programme, uniform and name. The programme was re-launched in 2002 as part of the 6-25 progressive programme and refreshed most recently in 2015.

Scouts wear a uniform of a green shirt or blouse, navy blue activity trousers or skirt, group neckerchief and scout belt and earn badges for skills learned and challenges overcome which are sewn onto their uniform shirt.

== History ==
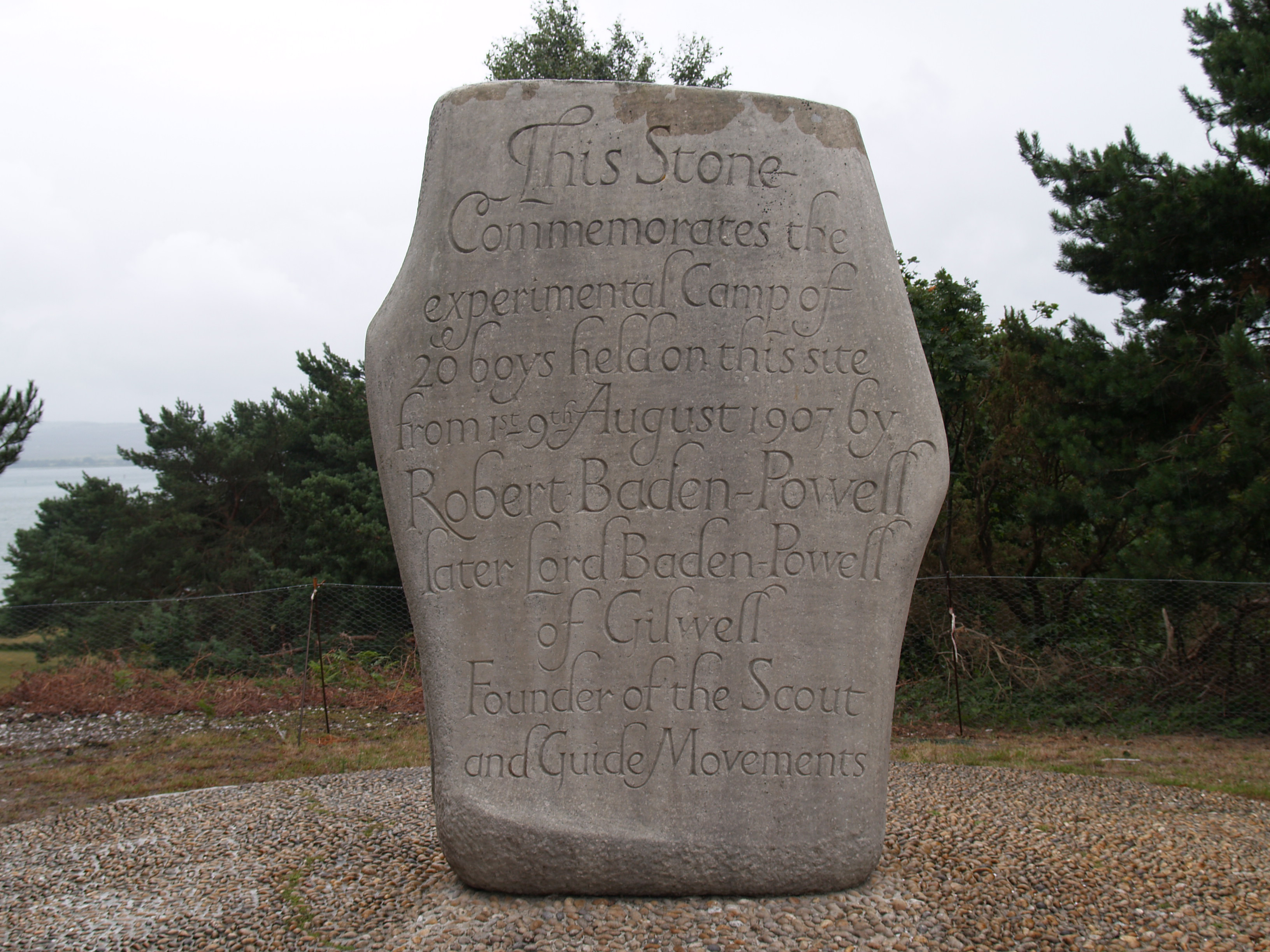
Stone marking the site of the 1907 camp on Brownsea Island.

=== Origins: 1907-1914 ===
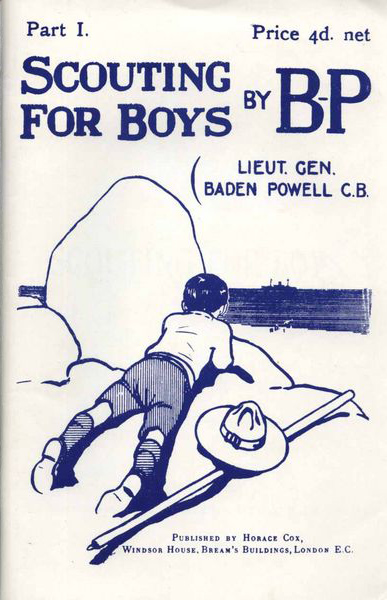
The cover of Scouting for Boys.

The Scout section emerged from the ideas of Scouting's founder Robert Baden-Powell for a training scheme for boys based on the skills learned in the army. Before these were published the format was tested at an experimental camp on Brownsea Island in Dorset in August 1907 lasting eight days and attended by 22 boys for a range of class backgrounds in London. Concepts still key to the movement, such as the patrol system, ceremonies and scoutcraft emerged from this camp.

In January 1908, the tested ideas began to appear in Scouting for Boys, published fortnightly in six parts, which contained Baden-Powell's Scout training scheme, a series of tests intended to build character and good citizenship in boys aged 11 to 18 years, as well as suggestions for organisation based around the patrol system established at Brownsea Island. The book was a runaway success and was reprinted six times in 1908 alone and was translated into a number of other languages including French, Italian, German, Chinese, Japanese and Hebrew. While the original intention was for the scheme to be used by existing youth groups, groups of boys from across the UK took it upon themselves to form into Boy Scout Patrols and to seek adult leadership, resulting in the formation of local Boy Scout Troops, each of several Patrols.

The movement began to develop over the next few years: the first Scout camp at Humshaugh took place in August–September 1908, the Sea Scout branch was formed to provide specialist nautical training in 1909 and badges and tests began to appear from around this time as well with 33 available by 1909. The same year saw the first National Scout Rally at the Crystal Palace attaracting 11,000 Scouts and the formation of a headquarters support structure for the fledgling movement.

=== War and peace: 1914-1945 ===
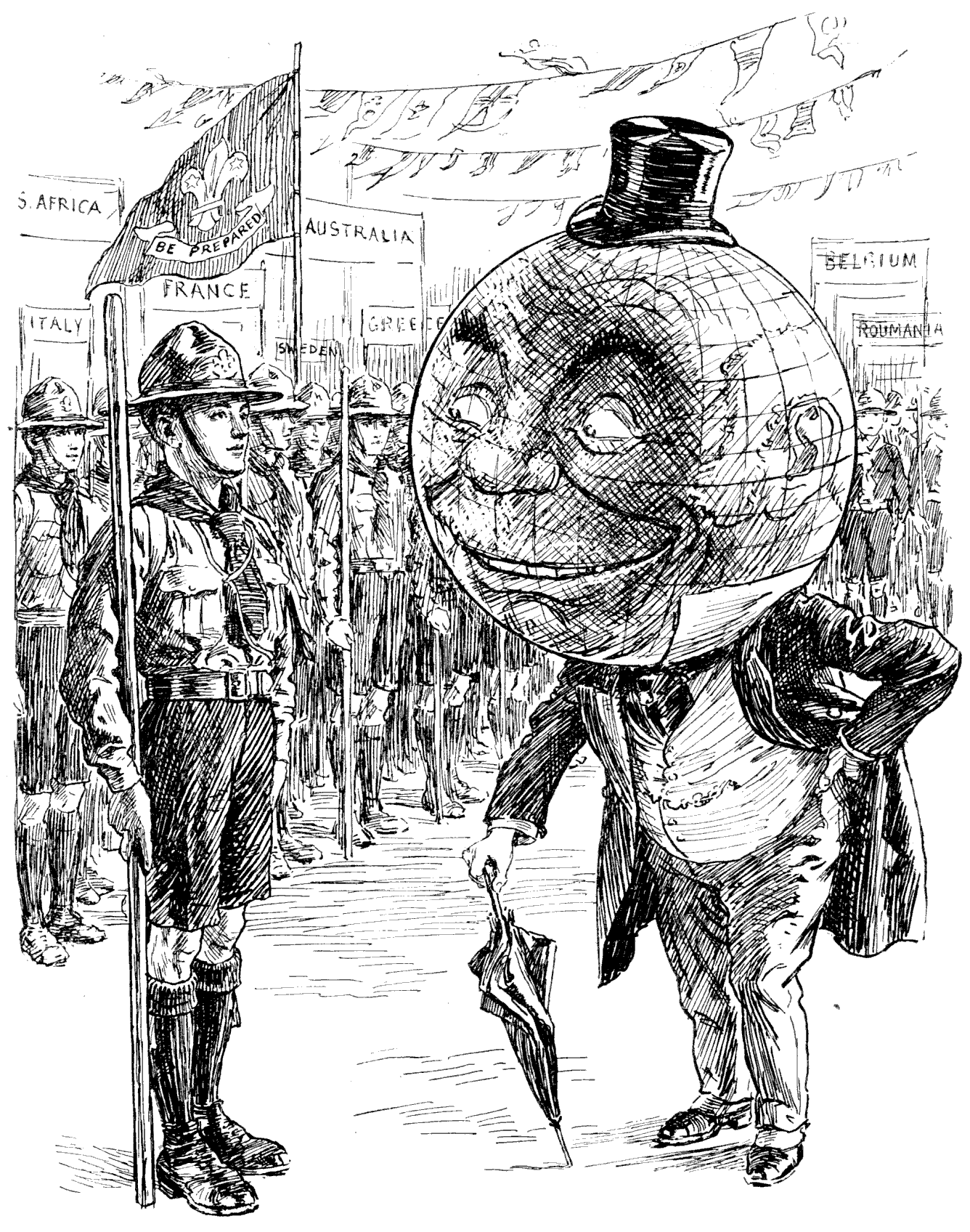
A cartoon from Punch showing the world gaining hope after seeing Scouts at the first World Scout Jamboree in 1920.

The outbreak of World War I saw the scouts contribute on the home front and through organising welfare facilities on the western front. At home Sea scouts performed cast-watching duties, Scouts acted as messengers and guarding key points on the railway network and worked the land among other tasks.

The war also saw the expansion of the movement for the first time as Scouting in the UK became more than just the core section we know as the Scout section today. 1916 saw the launch of the Wolf Cubs for younger boys which fed into the Boy Scouts and 1918 saw the launch of Rover Scouts for young adults which they could complete after the Boy Scouts. The first worldwide gathering of Scouts, the 1st World Scout Jamboree, took place in England in 1920 and began a precedent that continues to this day. Equally a separate branch of the section for those with additional needs was created in 1925, the Special Tests Branch, to include others into the movement.

With the close of the 1930s and the outbreak of World War II Scouts once again helped on the home front with older Scouts helping as messengers supporting the ARP service, erecting home shelters, working as telephonists, assisting the Home Guard and helping as first aid orderlies. In 1941 the rise of air services led to the formal creation of the Air Scout branch that focused on aviation and aeronautical activities.

However January 1941 also saw the death of Baden-Powell with Lord Somers becoming Chief Scout. The following year a post-war commission was established to review the movement and which led to the publication of The Road Ahead in September 1945.

=== Post war: 1945-1966 ===
The end of the Second World War had hit the Scout section and the movement as a whole hard with numbers drastically reduced with leaders, Rovers and older Scouts being drafted up for war service. In particular the post-war commission noticed in particular it was difficult to keep older boys in the Scout Troop and The Road Ahead, published in 1945, recommended the creation of a Senior Scout Section with the section officially commencing in October 1946. Scouts over the age of 15 could stay in the Troop, join a Senior Scout Patrol within the Troop, or join a separate Senior Scout Troop which was to consist of at least two Senior Patrols. The end of the war and post-war period also saw a few amendments to the tests and badges first outlined and unchanged since Scouting for Boys in 1908; in January 1944 the tests for Tenderfoot, Second Class and First Class scouts were revised, October 1946 saw the revised scheme of proficiency badges published and 1958 saw a refresh of the badge tests required.

Scouts during this time took part in a number of high-profile events, in addition to Jamborees, that helped to boost the image of the movement. These included the 1948 Summer Olympics, as markers for the marathon, in support roles for the games and one even carried the banner for Belgium in the opening ceremony as well as the 1951 Festival of Britain and assisting with crowd control and programme selling at the 1953 Coronation of Elizabeth II. Additionally a small change to the uniform was made in 1954 to allow Boy Scouts, Senior Scouts and Rover Scouts to opt for a beret as headwear instead of the traditional campaign hat.

The high-point of the 1950s was the Golden Jubilee celebrations for the movement in 1957 which included a Jubilee World Scout Jamboree in Sutton Coldfield attracting 35,000 Scouts from 90 countries.

=== Change and modernisation: 1966-2002 ===
Similar to the post-war commission which began following Baden-Powell's death, another period of reflection in the movement occurred from 1964 until the publication of the radical Chief Scouts' Advance Party Report in 1966. Among the 38 recommendations for the Boy Scout section included a change of title to the current Scout section, a revised Scout Law and Promise, a new uniform and a new three staged Progressive Training Scheme, intended to allow new entrants to advance more quickly. The uniform in particular included a modernised shirt style, the replacement of shorts and long socks with brown trousers and the replacement of the campaign hat with the beret. The Senior Scout section was also abolished and the age range amended to 11 to 16 years with Scouts now moving up to a new Venture Scout section. These changes were implemented in October 1967, causing a split in the movement, but was considered a success as it led to a growth in members and helped reposition the section as a modern movement.

Following the Advanced Party Report the programme and awards were overhauled. The badges used prior to 1966 were deemed difficult and expensive to administer as there were so many and standards were deemed low in some areas, phrased as 'the present badge scheme, while successful in some troops, produced depressingly low results in far too many cases.' Instead a wider range of interests were included with specific interest, pursuit, service, instructor and collective achievement badges introduced. Meanwhile, the programme was encouraged to be more flexible and that a 'dramatic increase in the amount of camping and outdoor activities' took place.

The formal training scheme that previously consisted of Tenderfoot, Second Class and First Class tests was replaced by the Scout Badge, Scout Standard, Advanced Scout Standard and Chief Scout's Award. the rationale for this was that the previous system was 'drawn up in such a way that a boy is not fully trained until he is First class, this means that by far the greater part of our Scouts are untrained and incapable of undertaking challenging Scouting activities...while part of this situation is attributable to poor leadership, outdated and unattractive tests are major contributing factors.' Furthermore, it was noted that boys left 'disappointed and disillusioned without finding the challenge or excitement they seek' especially around the age of 12-13 which was described as 'particularly disquieting and [a] gross loss'. It was also noted that only 10% of Scouts achieved the First class top award, an additional 20% the Second class test (30% total) with less than half of Scouts able to achieve the beginner tenderfoot test.

The seventy fifth anniversary of the Brownsea Island camp was marked in 1982 and deemed 'The Year of the Scout' and marked by a House of Commons reception by the Speaker, series of postage stamps and activities involving the number 75 such as tidying 75 square yards of land or a party of 75 elderly people. Two years later, the training scheme was again revised where the Scout badge, Scout standard, Advanced Scout standard and Chief Scout's Award were replaced with the age-based progressive Scout Award, Pathfinder award, Explorer award and Chief Scout's Award.

In February 1990, it was decided in principle that the Association would become fully co-educational, leading to individual Scout Groups being able to decide to accept girls into Scouts and the other sections. This was formally allowed from July 1991 when the Scout Association's Royal Charter was amended. As of January 2020, female Scouts make up 27% of Scouts across the UK.

=== Relaunch: 2002-2015 ===
After nearly 40 years since the last major change in the section and following declining membership numbers, the Scout section was re-launched in the 21st century in line with the other sections of the association. In May 2000 The Programme Review final report was produced after consultation that had been undergoing since 1995 with members of the Scouts and focus groups and led to a revamp of the programme in February 2002. The biggest change came through the age range of the section which was reduced to 10½ to 14 years because of the creation of Explorer Scouts instead of Venture Scouts. One year before, in London Fashion Week 2001, new uniforms were unveiled for the section which saw a new design teal shirt, navy blue activity trousers and a wider range of optional accessories such as a branded baseball cap and polo shirts. A logo was introduced along with all publications for the section being relaunched to reflect the new programme and wider Scout Association brand and visual identity.

The previous challenge awards were discontinued and replaced with a set of eight diamond challenge awards (outdoor, outdoor plus, creative, fitness, global, community, adventure and expedition) covering the six new programme zones. The top award for the section, the Chief Scout's Gold Award, was achieved for completion of the Outdoor challenge, four of the other challenges and a personal challenge. The proficiency badges were renamed and redesigned to circular blue activity badges and could be earned along with the new Staged Activity Badges and the Group Awards (later renamed Partnership Awards) available to all sections under 18 years. The Group awards were a series of three (International friendship, Environment and Faith) that encouraged multiple sections within a group to work together or to work with outside organisations to complete a project or activity.

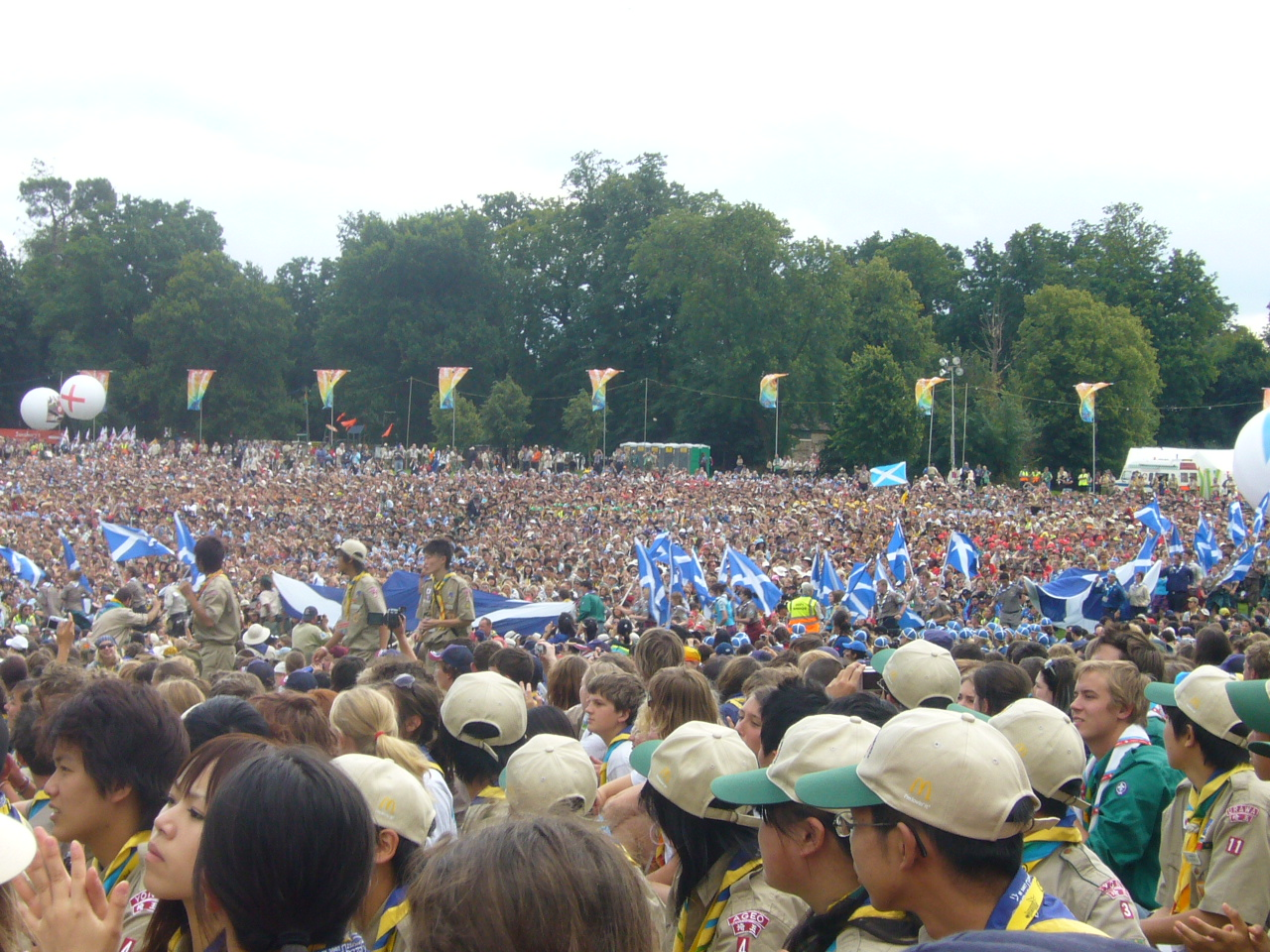
Opening ceremony of the 21st World Scout Jamboree.

The long-awaited Centenary of Scouting took place in 2007 and included the centenary of the section itself. Celebrations included the 21st World Scout Jamboree in Essex attended by Prince William and 40,000 young people from 158 countries, a sunrise ceremony on Brownsea Island, commemorative badge, 50p coin and postage stamps and a live stage show called Live 07: The Festival of Scouting.

In 2008, the Scout Association re-launched the programme zones so that there were now six zones with common themes for all four under 18 sections. As part of this, a new Promise Challenge award was introduced and the Chief Scout's Gold award changed to make achievement as simple as achieving the six challenges that covered the key areas of the programme and two of three advanced outdoor challenge awards (Outdoor plus, adventure and expedition).

In 2014, the Scouting for All strategic plan for the next four years was launched that included an increased focus of community impact, youth voice and inclusion in the programme and which emerged from youth feedback, including from Scouts. Off the back of this, a refresh of the programme was scheduled for 2015 and in April 2014, the Scout Association released two new activity badges and one new staged activity badge which were to be added as part of the refresh.

=== Skills for life: 2015-present ===
In January 2015, the Scout programme received a refresh along with the programmes of all other sections and saw a renewed emphasis on outdoor activities, skills and world activities and the dropping of programme zones and partnership awards. Subsequently, the challenge awards were replaced with nine new hexagonal Challenge awards: Adventure, Outdoor, Expedition, Skills, Creative, World, Personal, Teamwork and Team Leader challenges. There were a few changes to activity badges but the number of Staged activity badges were expanded greatly: the Information Technology badge was discontinued and replaced by a Digital Citizen (using technology) and Digital Maker (coding and uses of technology) badge; a new Air Activities staged badge for aeronautical skills and to link in with Air Scouts was launched; new Nautical skills, Paddle sports and Sailing staged badges to link with water activities and Sea Scouts were launched; a Navigator staged badge was launched to develop map-reading and navigating skills and a Community Impact staged activity badge was launched linking into the Scout's focus on community action and the A Million Hands partnership with charities.

In May 2018 the Scouts published their Skills for Life plan to 2023 which included improved tools for leaders, a refresh in the wider Scout visual identity and a promise to review uniforms.

== Organisation ==
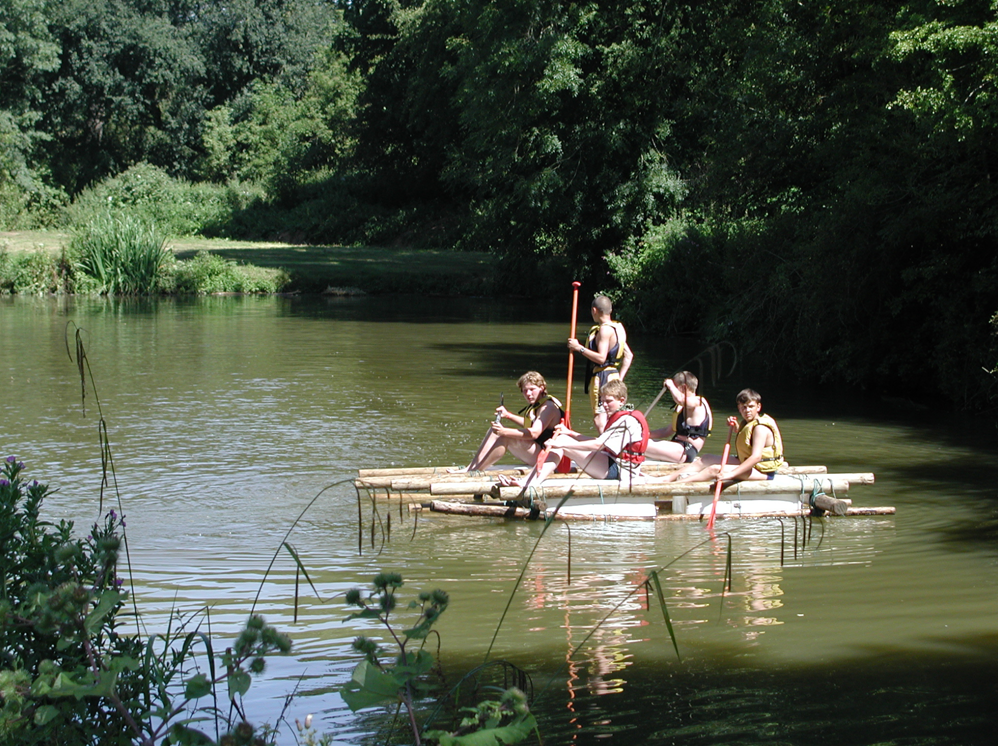
A Scout Patrol paddling the raft which they had built at Tolmers Scout Camp in Hertfordshire, 2007.

The Scout section is run locally within a Scout group along with the younger Beaver Scout and Cub Scout sections. The section, called a Scout Troop, is run by a volunteer adult leadership team, led by a Scout leader (sometimes abbreviated to SL and occasionally given the nickname 'Skip'), and made up of Assistant Scout Leaders (ASL) who share the same level of training as the Scout Leader, Sectional assistants who volunteer regularly with basic training, Young Leaders, 14-18 year olds who volunteer in the section, and occasional helpers who may be parents assisting as part of a rota.

Ever since the experimental camp on Brownsea Island, the Scouts within the troop are separated into groups of approximately 6-8 members called Patrols. They are led by a Patrol Leader and an Assistant Patrol Leader who are normally Scouts who have shown an ability to be responsible and pro-active. Some troops may also hold a position for a Senior Patrol Leader. Within the troop it is often that patrol leaders will plan and run activities, under the supervision of the Scout Leader team, or consult with the members of their troop.

The activities undertaken by Scouts are collectively called the 'programme' and include activities, games, visits and residential experiences with the aim of getting outdoors and discovering the world, learning new skills and helping in the community. The badges and awards achieved by the young people help support this programme and with the re-launch of every section's programme in 2002, was organised into six zones: scoutcraft and adventure, global, community, fit for life, exploring beliefs and attitudes and creative expression of which scoutcraft and adventure was intended to make up half of the activities completed. In 2008 the six zones were updated with themes common to all under-18 sections in Scouting: beliefs & attitudes, community, fitness, creative, global and outdoor & adventure. In 2015, the concept of zones was dropped across the movement with the focus now being on three core areas of outdoor & adventure, world and skills with outdoor & adventure making up half of time spent on the programme.

== Membership ==
Scouts is the oldest and second biggest section run by the Scout Association, only behind the younger Cub Scout section. The section has seen persistent growth for the past couple of decades, growing by 20,000 Scouts between 2009 and 2020. The numbers resported include those in all branches of the movement so include regular Scouts as well as Sea Scouts and Air Scouts.

Membership of the Scouts is open to anybody regardless of background, religion, or gender. Scouts became coeducational in 1991 and as of January 2023 27.5% of youth members (34,685) were female.

Membership of the Scout section.
Year	Members	Number of troops
2008-09	113,058	6,735
2009-10	117,328	6,815
2010-11	118,462	6,850
2011-12	121,374	6,922
2012-13	122,179	6,988
2013-14	124,714	7,073
2014-15	124,366	-
2015-16	125,853	-
2016-17	127,176	-
2017-18	129,900	7,130
2018-19	130,479	7,202
2019-20	133,473	7,229
2020-21	111,804	7,368
2021-22	122,335	7,228
2022-23	126,133	7,157

=== Promise ===
In common with other sections in Scouting, Scouts make a promise when they start in the section at a ceremony called being invested. The Scout promise is similar to the one originally written in Scouting for Boys with a few modifications to keep it up to date. The core promise long associated with the section, and the promise still used for Christians, Jews and Sikhs is:

On my honour, I promise that I will do my best,
to do my duty to God and to the King,
to help other people
and to keep the Scout Law.

Muslims use a wording of the promise similar to that above but with the word God replaced with Allah while Buddhists and Hindus replacing the word God with my Dharma. A promise for those of no faith was introduced in January 2014 and substitutes the phrase 'do my duty to God' in the promise above for 'uphold our Scout values'. For subjects of independent Commonwealth countries, foreign nationals and individuals who are stateless the phrase ‘duty to the King’ is replaced by '...to do my duty to the country in which I am now living.'

=== Law ===
The Scout law, referenced in the promise, aims to convey the values, method and purpose of the scouts (collectively called the fundamentals) in a way that is accessible to young people. The law is:

1. A Scout is to be trusted.
2. A Scout is loyal.
3. A Scout is friendly and considerate.
4. A Scout belongs to the world-wide family of Scouts.
5. A Scout has courage in all difficulties.
6. A Scout makes good use of time and is careful of possessions and property.
7. A Scout has self-respect and respect for others.

== Awards ==
Continuing with tradition dating back to 1909 and in common with other sections in Scouting, Scouts earn badges that are sewn onto their uniform to recognise and represent achievements during their time in the troop.

A number are core badges that are often earned by members as part of their time in the section. The Membership Award is given to Scouts after they have made their promise and been invested into the section, the Joining In Award recognises participation in the programme in yearly chunks and the Moving-On Award recognises continuation of the journey through Scouts: a red award may be worn by new Scouts to represent their time as a Cub Scout while a green award is presented to Scouts at the conclusion of their time in Scouts as they are about to join Explorer Scouts.

=== Challenge awards ===
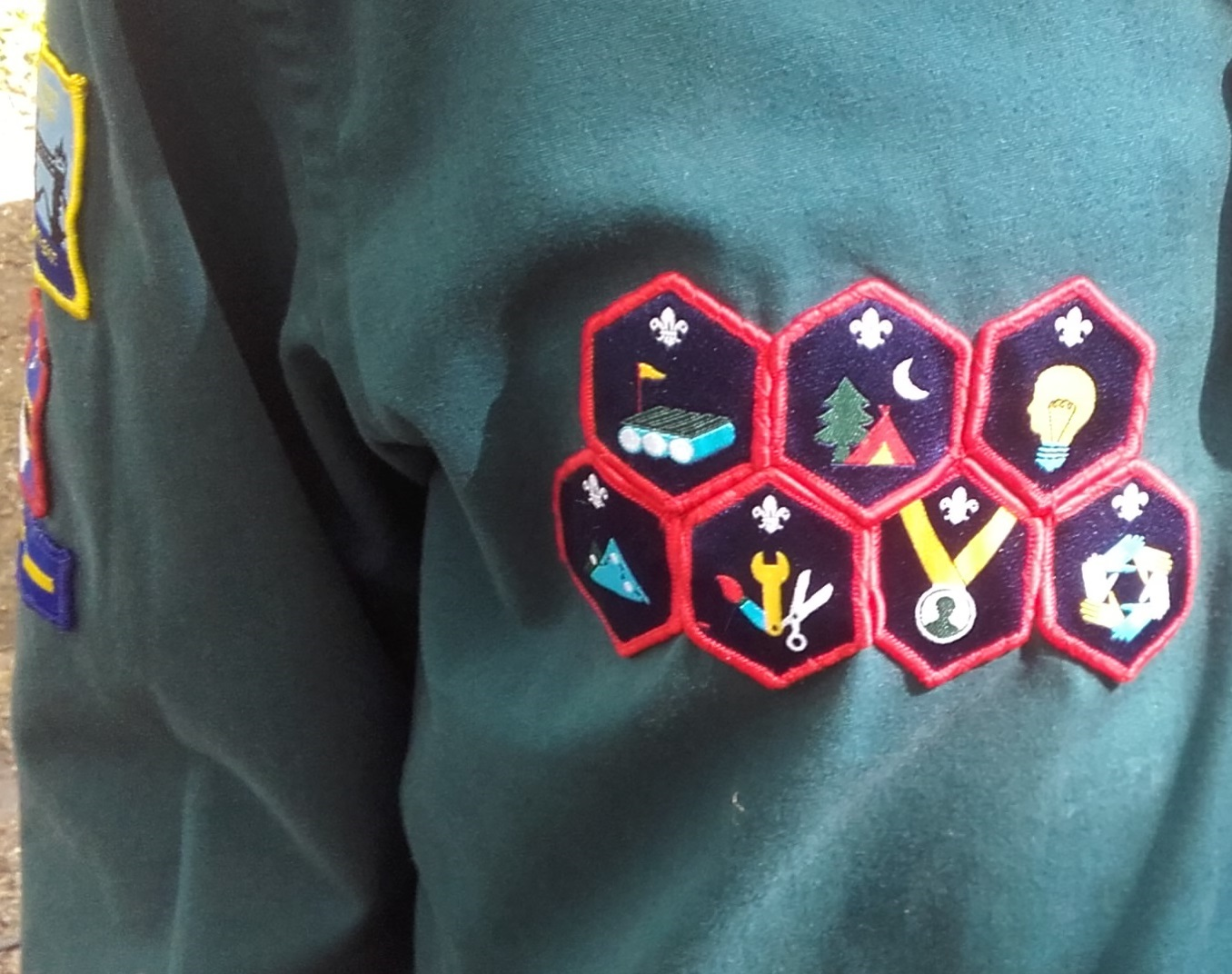
A Scout wearing some of the revised Challenge Badges introduced by The Scout Association in 2015.

The challenge awards are often completed together by the troop during their normal sessions and cover the range and aims of the programme. The current challenge awards were introduced in 2015 and are hexagonal in shape and navy blue in colour, worn on the chest. The nine awards are the Adventure, Outdoor, Expedition, Skills, Creative, World, Personal, Teamwork and Team Leader challenges. Each Challenge involves undertaking several tasks or taking part in activities related to a particular type of challenge and will involve trying something new, learning a new skill or completing something that is personally challenging to the young person.

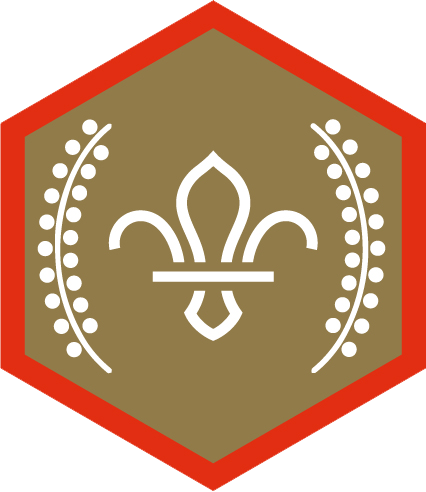
Chief Scout's Gold Award

The top award for the section is the Chief Scout's Gold Award which is awarded upon completion of all nine Challenge awards and six other activity badges. The Scout Association recognises that young people might not have completed the Challenge programme by the time they move on to Explorers and so they can continue working towards these awards in their first term as an Explorer. The award can also be worn on the Explorer Scout uniform once earned.

Challenge badges in their current form were introduced in 2002 with the 6-25 programme reset; prior to this there were a series of progressive awards achieved by young people in the troop based on age. The main four, rectangular in shape, were in order of age the Scout Award, the Pathfinder award, the Explorer award and the Chief Scout's Award. These four required the completion of activities from six developmental areas: scoutcraft, adventure, culture, community, health and commitment. Additional optional awards were the Patrol Activity Award, which were team based activities, the Leadership award, which develops leadership within the older Scouts, and the Chief Scout's Challenge, which encourages the application of skills already learnt and includes an expedition.

=== Activity badges ===
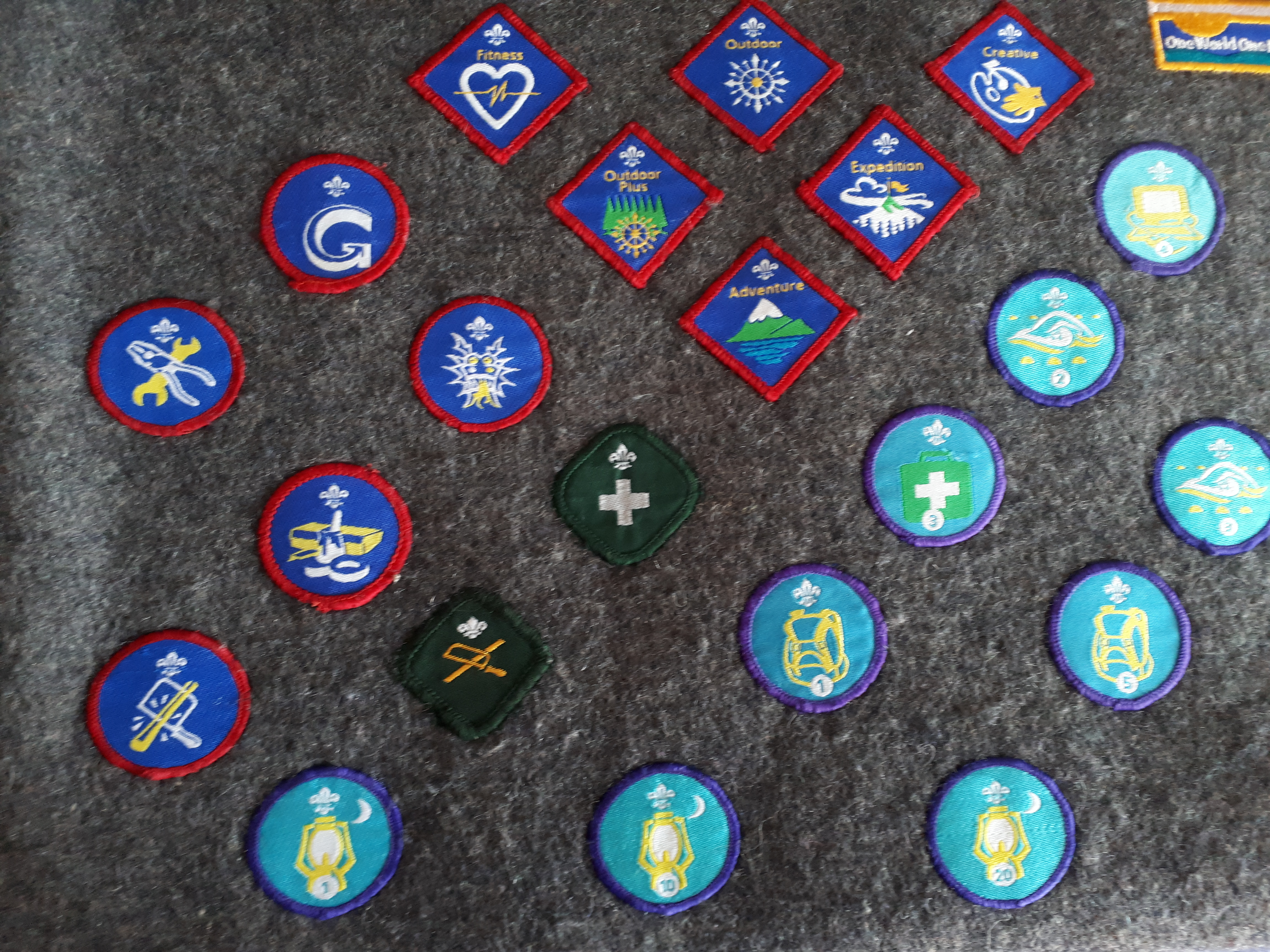
A selection of Scout badges earned from the UK including activity badges, staged activity badges and former designs for proficiency badges and challenge awards.

Activity badges are awarded for demonstrating skill or achievement in a particular subject which may be an existing hobby or a new area of knowledge. Prior to 2002, these were called Proficiency badges, as Scouts would need to be proficient in the skills and pass a test to prove completion. These came in five groups: interest (based on hobbies and intended for younger Scouts), pursuit (intended for older Scouts and explored a subject in more detail), service (applying theory and practical to teach skills to others), instructor (intended for older Scouts to prove expertise enough to teach younger Scouts) and collective achievement (gained through working in a patrol). In 2002, the current name of activity badges was used to modernise and better describe their purpose.

There are currently 59 different badges available with the most recently added being a Scientist badge in March 2019 and the fundraising and geocaching badges in April 2014. Upon their introduction in 2002 there were 70 activity badges however this number has decreased as a number of badges have been replaced by staged activity badges, in particular the three nautical skills badges, the three aviation skills badges as well as other progressive skills through the movement such as snowsports, emergency aid and navigation. The badges are circular in shape and are navy blue with a red border replacing the diamond badges used before 2002 that were green (interest and pursuit), red (service) green and red (collective achievement) or gold bordered (instructor).

=== Staged Activity Badges ===
Staged Activity Badges can be completed by any member of the movement between the age of 6 and 18. They are completed in different stages, so after completing each stage members are awarded the relevant badge and can advance to the next level regardless of their section. Current Staged Activity badges that are available are Air Activities, Community Impact, Digital Citizen, Digital Maker, Emergency Aid, Hikes Away, Musician, Nautical Skills, Navigator, Nights Away, Paddle Sports, Sailing, Snowsports, Swimmer and Time on the Water. The number of stages in each badge varies but most have around five stages while the Nights Away, Hikes Away and Time on the Water stages have more which count the number of cumulative experiences in that area the young people have, with sixteen milestones for Nights Away ranging from 1 to 200 nights away from home and eight for Hikes away and Time on the Water. The badge's design is a circular blue badges with a purple border, a design adopted in 2002 and with a slight darkening of the blue colour from 2018.

== Visual identity ==
=== Uniform ===
The current Scout uniform consists of a teal shirt or blouse, a neckerchief for the group, navy blue activity trousers or skirt and scout belt. Navy blue shorts, outer jacket, baseball cap and grey fleece can be adopted by a group as official uniform and a navy blue sweatshirt or teal polo shirt can be used for activity wear. It was designed by fashion designer Meg Andrew in 2000 as being a stylish and affordable uniform that was suited to outdoor wear and activity use. During the designing and consultation on the uniform design in 2000, the Scout section was originally imagined as wearing a dark grey coloured shirt, blouse or polo shirt. However, 45% of Scouts wanted the shirt to revert to the green colour scheme used before so a compromise was reached which resulted in the teal colour in use.

The uniform is different for members in Sea Scouts and Air Scouts, instead consisting of a light blue shirt or blouse instead of the teal colour of 'land' members and the addition of a hat; a Seaman's cap for Sea Scouts and a beret for Air Scouts.

The uniform is an evolution of the one used between 1967 and 2001, with a green coloured shirt or blouse and mushroom colour trousers used before. That uniform had been introduced following the Advance Party Report of 1966 which recommended a total redesign and modernisation of the uniform, because of "the Boer War appearance of our uniforms" and commenting that the "wearing of shorts by members of the Movement is one of the most damaging aspects of our present public image". Later amendments included the abolition of all uniform headgear except Sea Scout caps and Air Scout berets in 1989.

The original uniform for the section was laid out in Scouting for Boys where Baden-Powell recommended a distinctive and practical uniform that was "very like the uniform worn by my men when I commanded the South African Constabulary". This in turn, seems to have been derived from the dress adopted by Baden-Powell in the Second Matabele War of 1896, influenced by his friend and colleague, Frederick Russell Burnham. The original Boy Scout uniform consisted of a khaki shirt and shorts, a neckerchief or "scarf", campaign hat (known as a "B-P hat" in Britain) and a Scout staff. The exact specifications for these items were formalised in 1910. The first Sea Scout uniform was a seaman's cap issued at an experimental camp in Hampshire in August 1909; a navy blue jersey was adopted soon afterwards. The Boy Scout uniform remained largely unchanged for the first 60 years, although the woggle began to replace the knot used to fasten the neckerchief from the early 1920s, and in 1954, a beret was introduced as an alternative to the expensive and awkward hat, green for Boy Scouts and blue-grey for Air Scouts.

=== Flags ===
In common with other sections of the movement, Scouts have a flag for use to identify the section, in parades or when a member is being invested. It is the same size as those used by the Cub, Explorer and Scout Network sections and is 4 feet by 3 feet and is mounted on a wooden pole with scout fleur-de-lis at the end. The flag is dark green with white lettering, a white scout emblem on a purple circular background in the centre of the flag with the scout motto 'Be Prepared' underneath. Previously the flag lettering and the fleur-de-lis were in yellow against the brighter green background and these colours can still be seen in some sections where they have not needed to update their flag. These colours are also still used in Scotland, with the addition of a St. Andrew's Cross next to the hoist, the name appearing on black on yellow bars and the fleur-de-lis being yellow straight onto the green background.

=== Logo and visual identity ===
The logo used by the section between 2002 and 2015.

From the launch of the section until 2002, the section did not have any particular logo or visual identity although the Scout arrowhead used in the corporate logo did make appearances on Scout section training material. Between 2002 and 2015 the Scout logo consisted of an uppercase 'SCOUTS' wordmark in different colours and marked at the corners, although it could appear in one colour in Scout purple. The typeface used for the logo and for headings in Scout publications was a bespoke font called Scout Section, that had a technological and futuristic feel and appeared very square with every character as wide as it was tall, while Frutiger was used for body text in line with the rest of the association. Publications in 2002 also included a series of mascots, based on a diverse group of patrol members in cartoon form, which were taken from the main publication for the section at launch The Matrix. This branding received a refresh in 2012 when the mascots were dropped and the logo preferences were tweaked to prefer a single colour version on documents opposed to the multi-coloured version, normally white or the same teal colour used in the uniform. Additionally the focus of text and images shifted to highlight adventure, fun, and friendship matching the wider Scout Association brand message of 'everyday adventure' introduced in 2008.

In 2015, the Scout Association updated their visual identity style, including the section brands, to focus on the Scouting fleur-de-lis. As part of this, the new Scout logo was overhauled to a new uppercase 'SCOUTS' teal wordmark in a bold and rounded typeface with a fleur-de-lis added to the logo, located either in the top right of the wordmark or a larger version located directly above the wordmark. The previous Scout Section typeface was dropped and TheSerif was used for headings in line with the rest of the association and Frutiger continued to be used for body text. Scout publications reduced the use of pictures and instead used an artwork style described as exacting, realistic and information driven and often showed illustrations of scouts completing activities.

When the Scout Association brand was updated in May 2018, with a new and stylised fleur-de-lis, the Scout section logo was altered to remove the previous fleur-de-lis mark. Publications either continued the use of the previous artwork or used the new image style of the association and the typeface for all documents was updated to use the Google Fonts typeface Nunito Sans.

== Events and Activities ==
The Scout programme is flexible to the needs of members. A key part of the programme is Outdoor and Adventurous activities and in addition to camping and other scout craft, adventurous activities such as hiking, rock climbing, kayaking, sailing, caving, and shooting proving popular with units. As Scouts can become quite proficient in their chosen activities, it is possible for Scouts to gain a personal activity permit as part of the Scouts adventurous activity permit scheme.

=== World Scout Jamboree ===
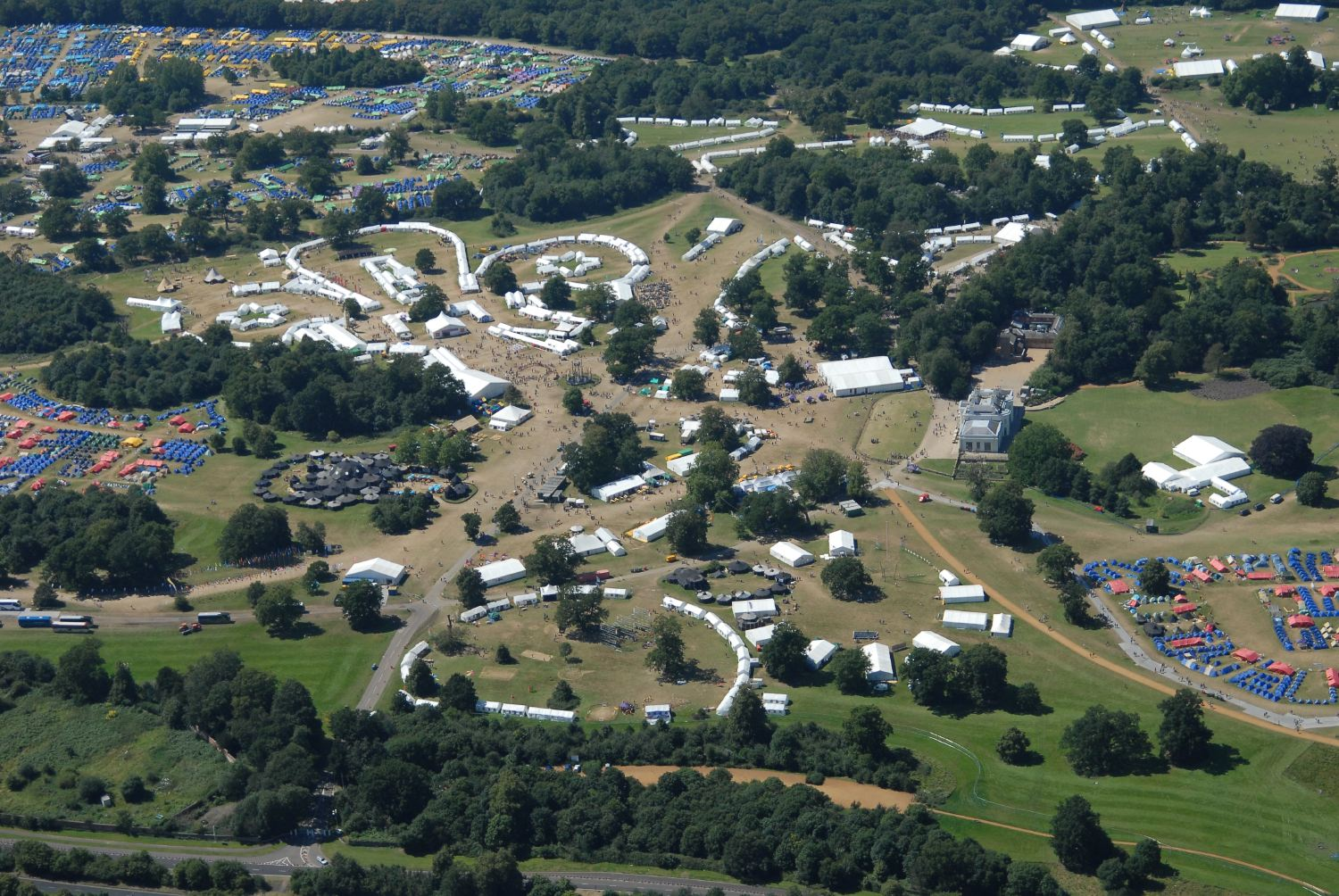
The campsite of the 21st World Scout Jamboree held in 2007 in the UK.

The World Scout Jamboree takes place every four years in countries across the world and the UK sends approximately 4,000 Explorer Scouts from across the country, split into some 40 units with their own leaders and branding. Although Scouts are too young to attend the Jamboree, selection for Jamborees often takes place years ahead of the event so it is highly likely that Scouts begin training and fundraising for the World Scout Jamboree while they are in the Scout section. The purpose of the event is to take part in activities with Scouts from across the world with some 45,000 scouts from 152 countries at the most recent 24th World Scout Jamboree at the Summit Bechtel Reserve, United States.

=== Scout Association events ===
The Scout Association, through their Scout Adventures subsidiary, run a number of national events for members of the Scout section. These are centred on the nationally owned scout centres such as Gilwell Park.

Winter Camp is held on a weekend in January at Gilwell Park, North London. The event, hosted for Scouts, Explorers, Guides and Rangers, includes over 70 activities over the course of the weekend that the individuals can take part in during the day. The event has grown from 2,500 attendees in 2010 to 4,000 in 2019.

A more recent event is Scarefest which is held on the weekend closest to Halloween at Gilwell Park, North London. Similar to Winter Camp, it is open to Scouts, Explorers, Guides and Rangers and features activities such as climbing, archery and laser games.

=== Damboree ===
Established in 2018, Damboree is a grass-root movement to encourage leaders to apply for a camp site permit to enable Scouts of all ages to camp. Originally established to benefit the Beaver Scout section (hence the name which is a combination of Dam, named for the dams built by Beavers, and jamboree which refers to any large gathering of Scouts) in 2020 the event expanded to include Scouts and their leaders and to encourage as many as possible to gain the permit rather than relying on a small number of people in each group.

It is part of the Scout Association, being a Scout Active Support unit of Milton Keynes Scouts, but is not directly controlled by Scouts HQ. While the event is not one specific event, there is a focus weekend planned each year which packs are encouraged to host their camps on.

== See also ==
- The Scout Association - the parent organisation of the Scout section.
- Sea Scouts (The Scout Association) - branch of Scouts that focuses on nautical activities.
- Air Scouts (The Scout Association) - branch of Scouts that focuses on aeronautical activities.
- Cub Scouts (The Scout Association) - the section that precedes Scouts.
- Explorer Scouts (The Scout Association) - the section that follows Scouts.
- Age groups in Scouting and Guiding
- Boy Scout - details of other similar sections globally.
- Girl Guides - international equivalent section in Guiding movement.
