= Explorer Scouts (The Scout Association) =

Section of the Scout Association in the United Kingdom for 14- to 18-year-olds

- Owner: The Scout Association
- Age range: 14–18
- Country: United Kingdom
- Founded: February 2002
- Membership: 44,273 (January 2023)
Previous; Scouts; Sea Scouts; Air Scouts	Next; Scout Network
- Website https://www.scouts.org.uk/explorers

Explorer Scout uniform

Explorer Scouts, frequently shortened to Explorers, is the fifth section of the Scout Association in the United Kingdom for 14- to 18-year-olds. The section was introduced in 2001 and formally launched in February 2002, alongside Scout Network, to replace the former Venture Scout section for fifteen-and-a-half to twenty-year-olds.

Following on from the Scout section, Explorer Scouts are run in Units at a District level as opposed to the more local Group level that run the younger sections. In addition to earning activity badges in common with younger sections, Explorers are able to attain the highest awards in the movement such as the King's Scout Award.

Part of the programme for the section is the Young Leader's scheme, which trains Explorer Scouts in leadership methods and allows them to volunteer with the younger sections of the movement.

== History ==
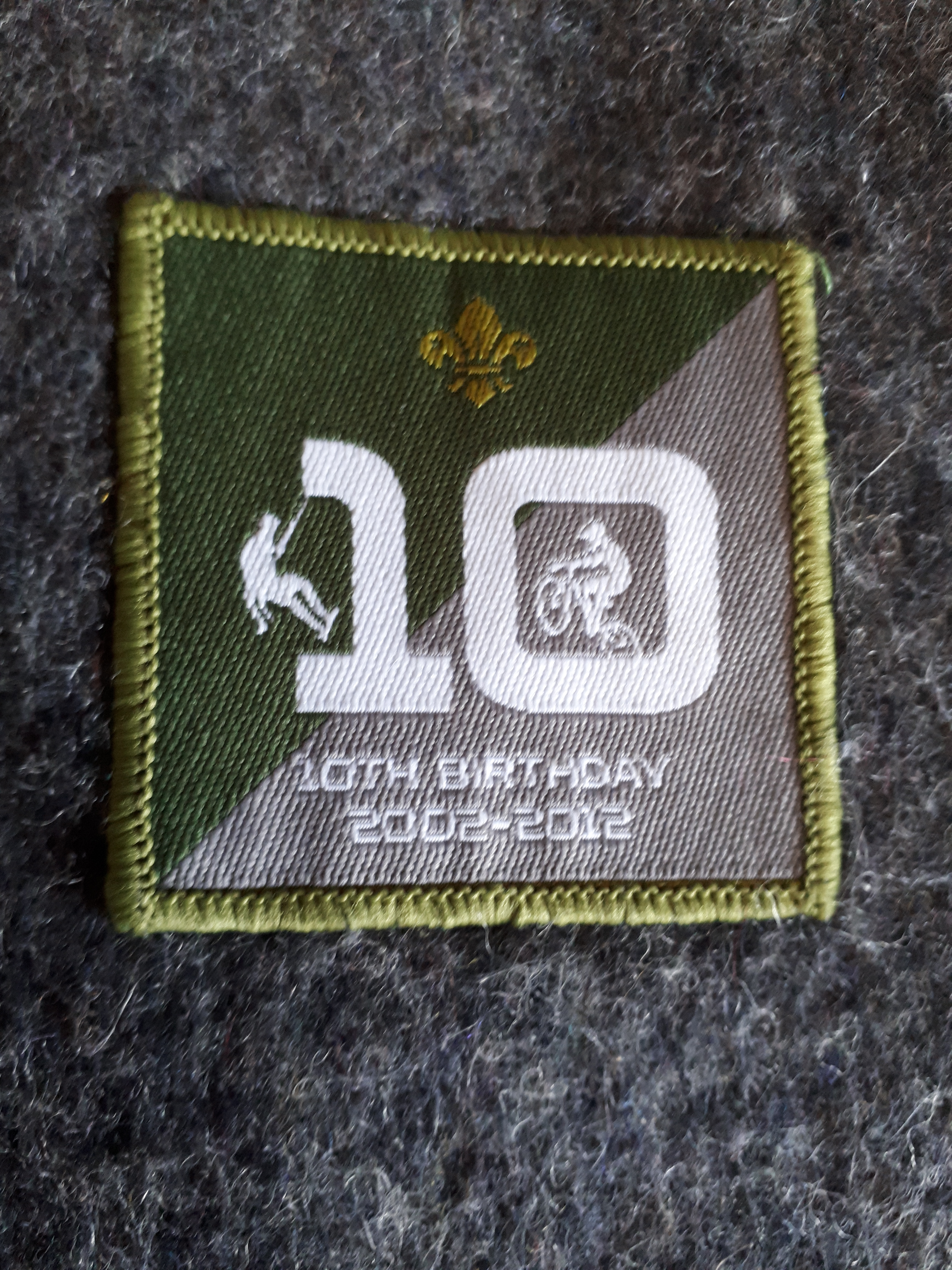
A special badge to mark the 10 year anniversary of the Explorer Scout and Scout Network sections in the United Kingdom.

The Explorer Scout section was established in the early years of the 21st century. The previous decade had seen a decline in the Scout Association's membership, with an annual loss of 30,000 members, prompting a programme review that commenced in 1995 and was implemented from 2001 onward. The section officially launched in February 2002 with the previous sections, notably Venture Scouts, and age ranges being phased out by December 2003. The new Explorer Scout section is run at the district level, with units strategically placed to cover the entire area, unlike the younger sections and the former Venture Scout section, which were run at the local Scout Group level. When it was set up, the activity programme for the section followed eight programme zones that matched those of the Scout Network section. This was to change however in 2008 when the first four sections began using six programme zones covering the same themes (even if the names differed to be age appropriate for the section).

The programme for the section was expanded in 2003 with the launch of the Young Leaders scheme, allowing Explorer Scouts and those of a similar age to volunteer with the younger sections as part of the leadership team. The scheme was an unexpected success and the number of Explorer Scouts volunteering as Young Leaders had reached 10,394 by 2012, within the first 10 years of the scheme. In 2012 the section, along with Scout Network, celebrated their tenth anniversaries with a uniform badge available to celebrate the occasion.

Between August and December 2013, a youth consultation was held into the future of Scouting under the title of Be... initiative. While not making any specific recommendations about the Explorer Scout section, the consultation focused on increasing community action and youth input into all sections and changing the perception of Scouts to encourage more people to join. The report fed into the Scout Association's strategy for the next four years which had key aims matching the outcomes of the Be... report. In 2015 the programme for Explorer Scouts was updated along with the logo and visual identity for the section. The programme now focused on 15 challenge areas around three broad themes concurrent with all the other sections.

In 2018 the Scouts published their Skills for Life plan which acknowledged that young people drop out of the Scout's 6-25 programme between 14 and 25 years. In response, they planned a number of changes to the Explorer Scout provision before 2023 including "review[ing] the Explorer Scout programme to increase retention", "ensur[ing] that Young Leaders are well supported, recognised and can articulate the benefits of their experience" and "review[ing] our uniform starting with the Explorer Scout uniform".

In 2026, the Explorer Scouts programme and visual identity was updated once again, introducing new badges focused on digital content creation and online safety, employability, democracy and life skills.

== Organisation ==
Unlike the younger sections and the Venture Scouts before them, Explorer Scout Units are controlled by a Scout District covering a larger area than the more local Scout Groups. Districts are able to have as many Explorer Scout Units as they see fit with members able to participate in the programme of other units in their area. Some units have formal partnership agreements with local groups, where access to equipment and meeting places are negotiated, while other units may be more specialised with a focus on a particular activity or a certain part of the programme such as providing a Young Leader unit to deliver the Young Leaders Scheme.

Explorer Scout Units are run by volunteer leaders and supported by volunteer managers at the district level. An individual unit is run by an Explorer Scout Leader with a team of assistant leaders and helpers, with the team in charge of the overall programme of the unit and ensuring adequate safety of members. Each unit is supported at a wider district level by a District Explorer Scout Commissioner, who supports the effective running and cooperation of the units, and a District Explorer Scout Administrator, whose main role is in the transfer of membership between sections at 14 and 18 years of age.

=== Young Leaders ===
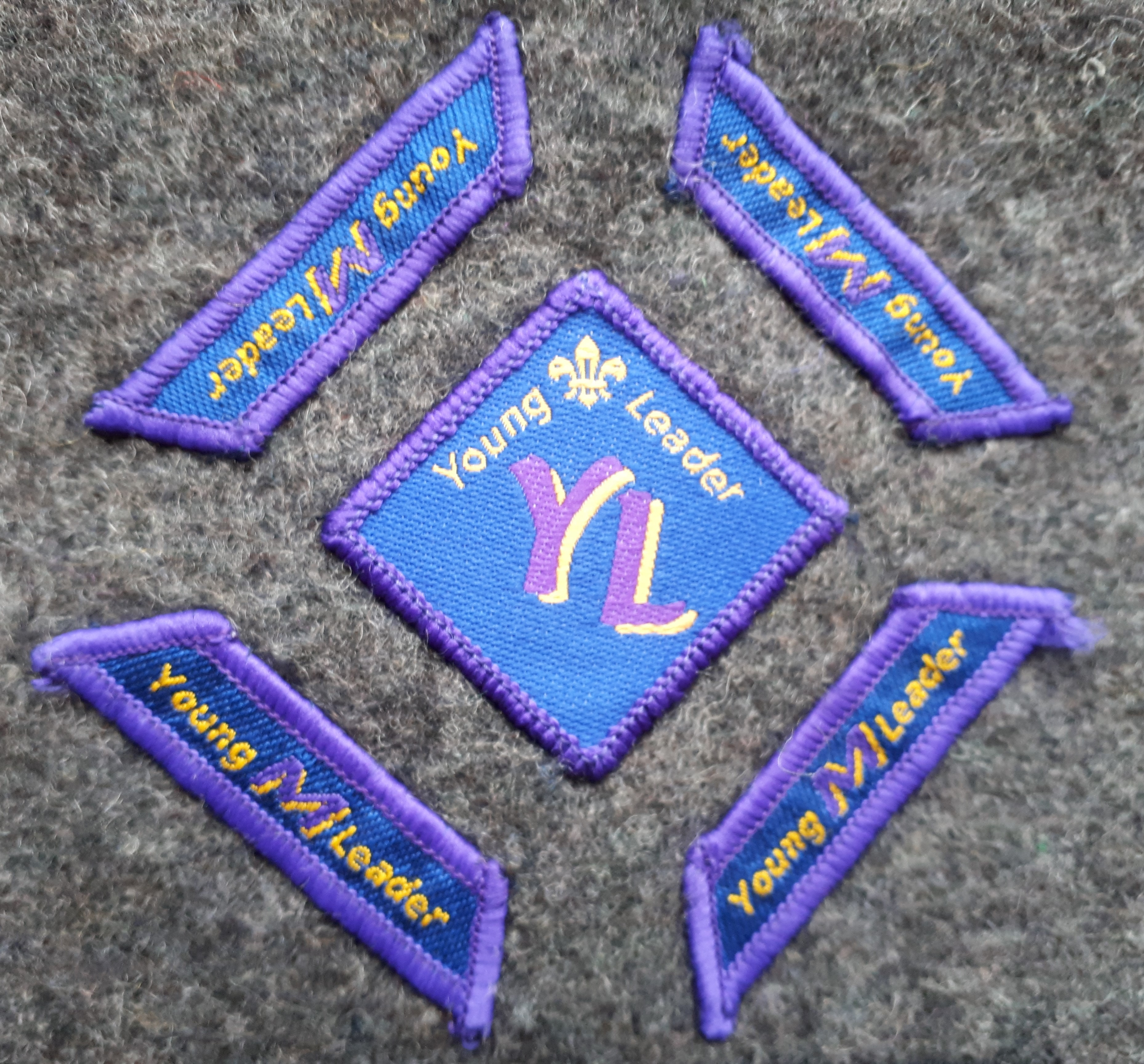
Badges from the Young Leader scheme – a design used from 2002 until 2015

Young Leaders are Explorer Scouts who choose to provide leadership in Beaver Scout Colonies, Cub Scout Packs or Scout Troops alongside adult volunteers as a part of the leadership team. Training of Young Leaders is achieved through eleven lettered modules covering the necessary skills to play an active part of the leadership team, with members challenged to apply what they have learned through four 'missions' in their sections.

Recognition of the scheme is achieved through a series of badges and culminates in the Young Leader belt buckle award which is worn with their uniform. The Young Leaders Badge is awarded upon the completion of the compulsory training module and is surrounded by one of four mission badges as each 'mission' is completed; the buckle is awarded only through the completion of every module and mission. The design of the awards was initially the letters 'YL' on blue and purple but was updated in 2015 to an acorn and oak leaves to reflect the Gilwell Oak and the role of Young Leaders as future leaders of the movement.

The scheme has been popular with young people looking to volunteer in their community. Since its launch in 2002, the scheme has grown from 1,245 young leaders to 10,394 a decade later with transferable skills being highlighted as a benefit. It is also used by young people taking part in extra-curricular award schemes such as The Duke of Edinburgh's Award, with volunteering with the Scouts including as a Young Leader the fourth most popular way for young people to achieve this part of the award in 2019.

== Membership ==
The launch of the Explorer Scout section was seen as a success following its launch and after 10 years, the membership of the section had grown beyond the highest peak of the previous Venture Scout section of 39,000. In the later years of the 2010s, membership of the section steadied off to become more consistent. The section has always been coeducational, and as of January 2023 33.5% (14,829) of its young people are female.

Membership of the Explorer Scout section.
Year	Members (Young Leaders in brackets)	Number of Explorer Scout Units
2002-03	15,292	1,224 (1,278 Venture Scout Units)
2008-09	31,948 (8,453)	2,141
2009-10	34,689 (9,640)	2,291
2010-11	36,346 (9,030)	2,344
2011-12	38,801 (10,394)	2,436
2012-13	40,490 (11,702)	2,520
2013-14	43,043 (11,702)	2,591
2014-15	44,356	-
2015-16	44,349	-
2016-17	43,749	-
2017-18	43,514	2,850
2018-19	44,032	2,881
2019-20	45,907 (18,523)	2,958
2020-21	36,582 (12,748)	3,035
2021-22	41,226 (15,394)	3,037
2022-23	44,273 (17,716)	3,020

=== Promise and law ===
Explorer Scouts, in common with other Scouts, make a promise soon after joining the section. This promise is the same as that used for any member of The Scout Association from age ten and a half and includes a promise to do their best, help other people and a duty to a higher purpose. There are different variations of the promise to accommodate members of different faiths (and none) and whether they are a resident of the United Kingdom.

The promise also requires the member to follow the Scout law. These seven statements are also common to all members of the Scout Association from age ten and half upwards and, with the promise, reinforces the values of the movement.

== Awards ==
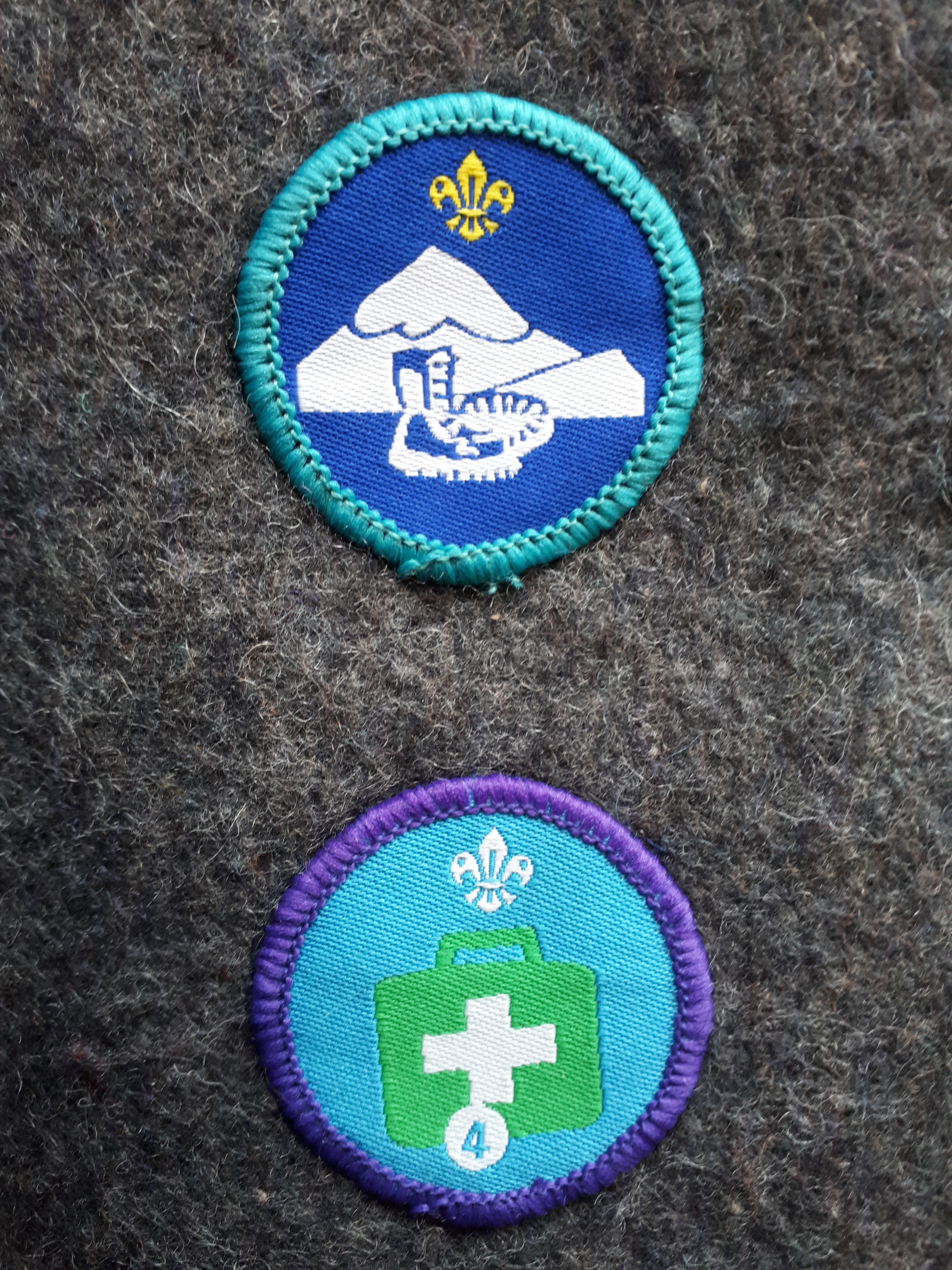
A hill-walker Explorer Scout activity badge (top) and an Emergency Aid stage 4 staged activity badge (below).

In common with other sections of the Scouting movement, progress and achievement is recognised through badges worn on the uniform shirt. Membership of the section is marked with the membership award, a purple badge with the scout symbol worn on the left chest that is common to scouts across the world, with years within the movement marked through a series of participation awards. Challenge awards, already established within the younger people's Scouting sections, will be introduced from September 2026 with full adoption expected by September 2027.

Proficiency in particular skills is marked through the award of 25 activity badges, covering activities as diverse as caving and street sports, and 15 staged activity badges which are common across the younger sections and are designed to mark progression of skills.

Between 2002 and 2015, Explorer Scouts could also work towards the International, Environment and Faith partnership awards that required completing a longer-term project in partnership with another section or unit. These awards were discontinued in the 2015 programme refresh and the idea of community projects linked into other awards and areas of the programme, in particular the Community Impact staged activity badge.

There are also badges and awards linked to the Young Leaders scheme, awarded through completion of training, missions and culminating in the Young Leader Belt Buckle and a series of awards linked to youth empowerment within the section.

=== Top Awards ===
Explorer Scouts continue the programme of progressive top awards which members are encouraged to achieve in the section. Three which are available to the Explorer Scout section, in order of difficulty, are the Chief Scout's Platinum Award, the Chief Scout's Diamond Award and the King's Scout Award (Queen's Scout Award for the first two decades of the section's existence). All three are linked to the Duke of Edinburgh's Award (Bronze, Silver and Gold respectively) with completion of certain sections of either award contributing to the other.

The awards all require Explorer Scouts to, over a length of time, volunteer with a community organisation, learn or develop a skill and undertake physical activity. In addition, they must train, plan and complete a self-sustained expedition, have spent a number of nights away from home and completed activities linked to international scouting, the environment and exploring their beliefs and values. The Queen's Scout award also requires the member to spend time away from home on a residential experience with strangers.

A selection of Explorer Scout Top Awards
The Chief Scout's Platinum Award.

The Chief Scout's Diamond Award.

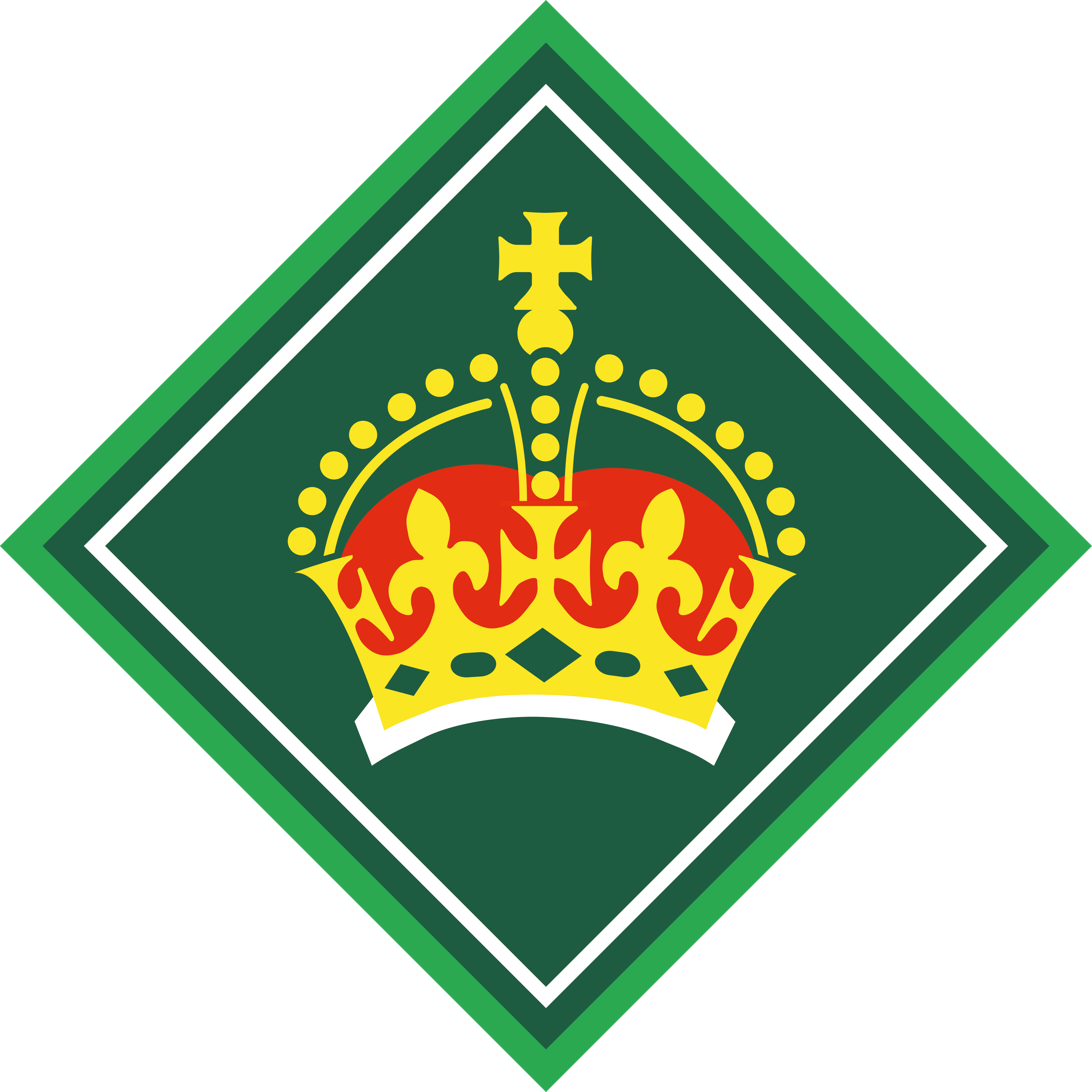
The King's Scout Award.

=== Explorer Belt ===
The Explorer Belt Award

The Explorer Belt is a long-standing award for Scouts that is achieved in various countries around the world. It was formerly earned by members of the Venture Scout section before becoming an award available to Explorer Scouts over 16 years of age and Scout Network members since 2002.

The Explorer Belt requires participants to undertake a 10-day expedition in a foreign country, devoting some time to travelling around and exploring. Participants also have to undertake a major project of their own choosing, along with a number of smaller projects or challenges some of which are not revealed to them until the start of the expedition. It is designed to develop an understanding of other peoples and cultures as well as develop resourcefulness and interdependence.

== Visual identity ==
=== Uniform ===
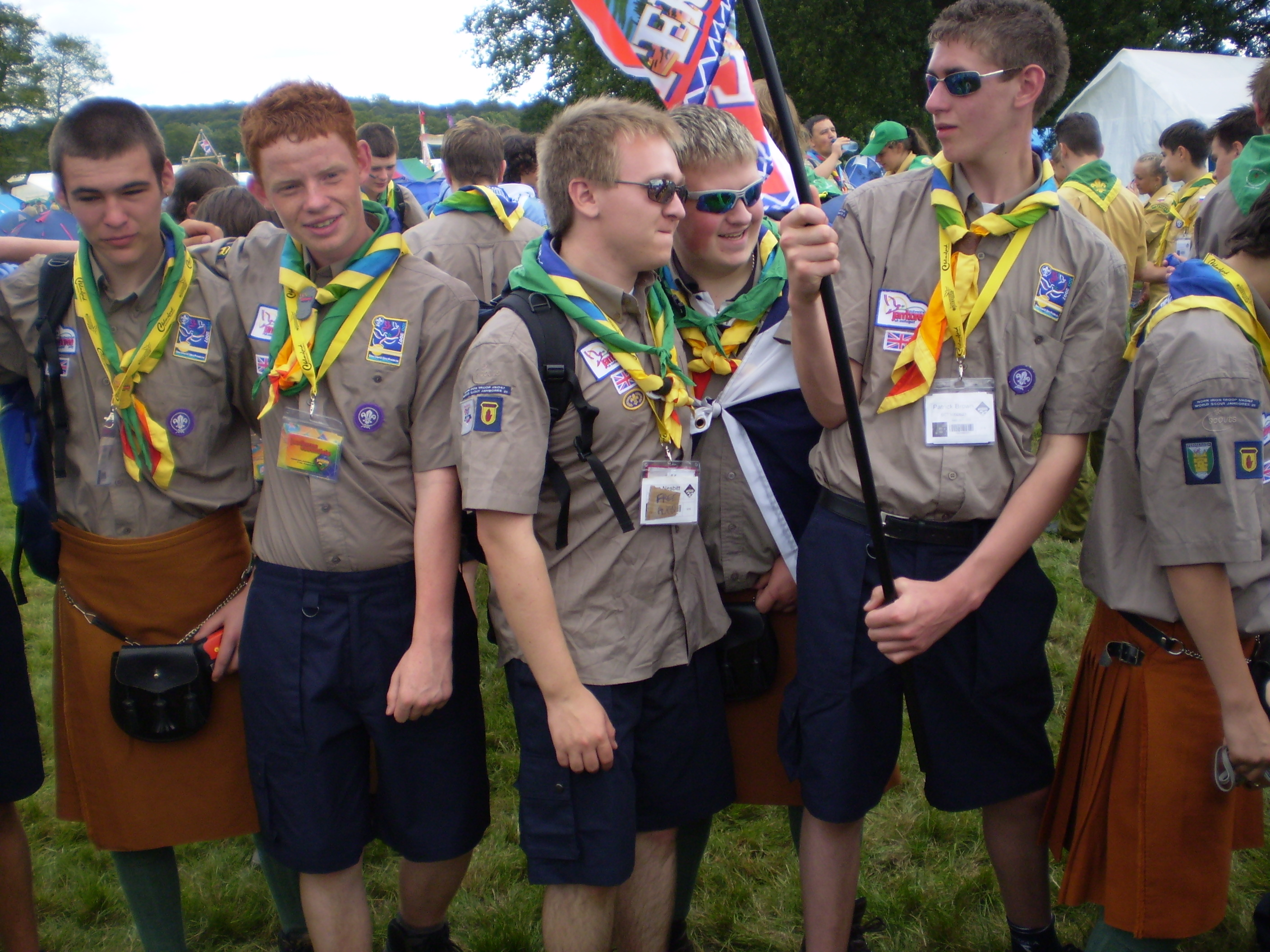
Explorer Scouts from Northern Ireland at the 21st World Scout Jamboree in 2007, wearing either activity shorts or the Irish saffron kilt.

Explorer Scouts, in common with the other Scout sections, is a uniformed movement. The Explorer Scout uniform consists of a beige shirt or blouse, a neckerchief for the unit, navy blue trousers or skirt and scout belt. It was designed by fashion designer Meg Andrew in 2000 as being a stylish and affordable uniform that was suited to outdoor wear and activity use. The uniform is largely similar to that of the Venture Scout section that Explorer Scouts replaced, with a similar beige coloured shirt or blouse, although with navy blue trousers or skirt instead of the previous mushroom colour scheme. During the designing and consultation on the uniform design in 2000, the Explorer Scout section was originally imagined as wearing a claret coloured shirt, blouse or polo shirt. However, only 14% of Venture Scouts approved of the colour when consulted on it, with one recorded comment describing it as "like something out of Star Trek" resulting in the change to the current colour.

The uniform is different for members in Explorer Sea Scout and Explorer Air Scout units, instead consisting of a light blue shirt or blouse instead of the beige colour of 'land' members and the addition of a hat; a Seaman's cap or peaked cap for Sea Scouts and a beret for Air Scouts.

=== Flags ===
In common with other sections of the movement, Explorer Scouts have a common flag design for use to identify the section, in parades or when a member is being invested into the unit. In England, Wales and Northern Ireland the flag is olive green with white lettering, a white scout emblem on a purple circular background in the centre of the flag with the scout motto 'Be Prepared' underneath. The flag in Scotland is different, due to the role of the Lord Lyon King of Arms in Scotland's ceremonies, and consists of an olive green background with the scout emblem and motto appearing in yellow and a St. Andrew's Cross next to the hoist.

=== Logo and visual identity ===
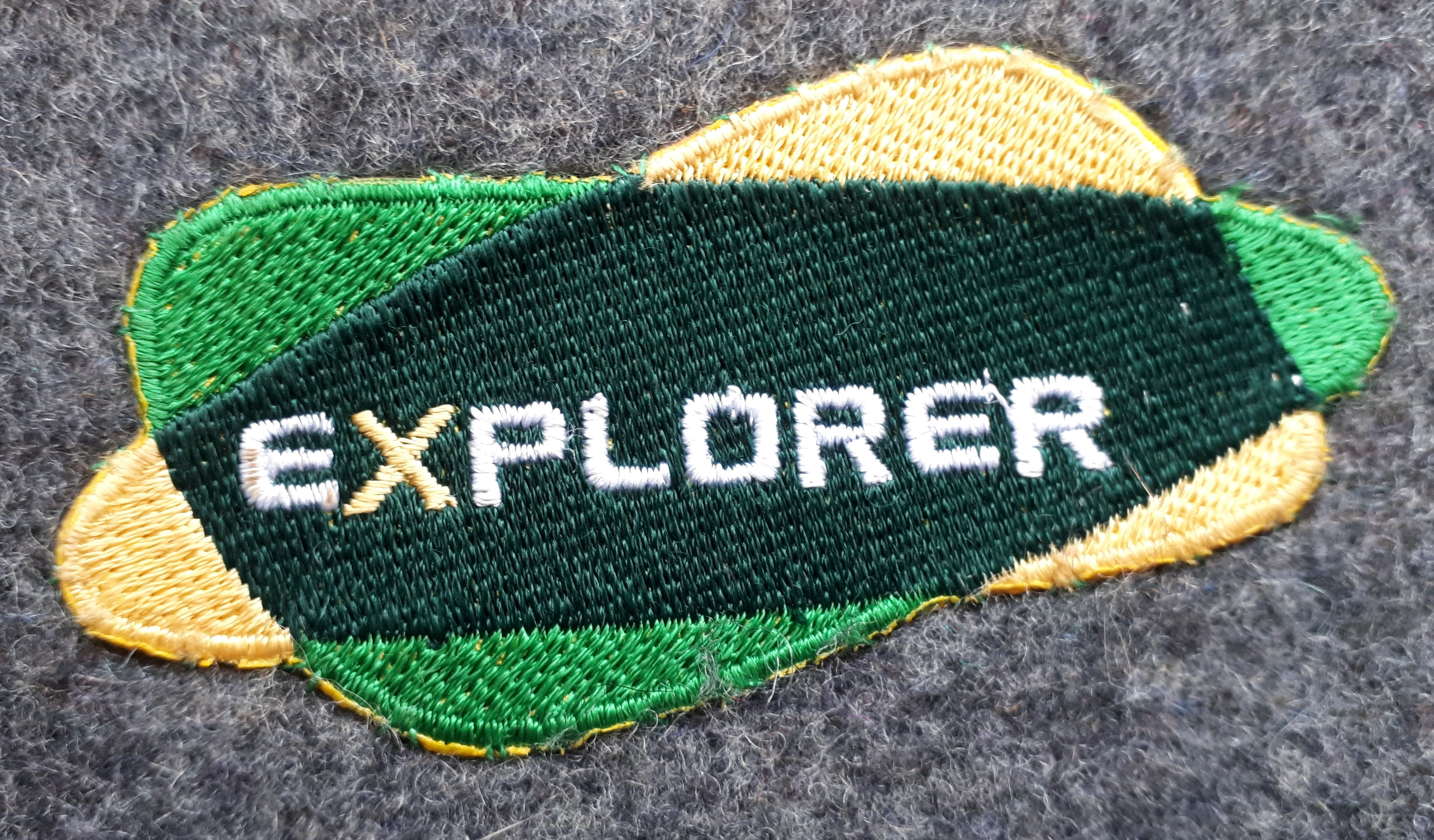
The Explorer Scout logo used between 2002 and 2015.

When the section was first launched in 2002, the Explorer Scout logo consisted of two scalene triangular shapes with curved corners overlapping each other with the word 'Explorers' inside the common area of both shapes. The colours used in logo, namely yellow and green, were the main colours for the section. A custom typeface called Explorer was used for the logo and for headings in Explorer Scout branded publications, with Frutiger used for body text in line with the rest of the association. Explorer was created to portray a "adventurous personality", fitting in well with the association brand focusing on everyday adventure introduced in 2008, and building on the previous positioning of Explorer Scouts as being "Extreme, Challenging and Streetwise".

In 2015, the Scout Association updated their visual identity style, including the section brands, to focus on the Scouting fleur-de-lis. As part of this, the new Explorer Scout logo was simplified to a navy blue wordmark with a small fleur-de-lis either located to the top right of the wordmark or a larger version located directly above the wordmark. The typeface for the wordmark was changed to Gill Sans, however this was not used in any other publication; instead TheSerif was used for headings in line with the rest of the association and Frutiger continued to be used for body text. Publications moved away from pictures and outlines and instead featured an artwork style that the association described as being "Editorial, sophisticated, expressive".

When the Scout Association brand was updated in May 2018, with a new and stylised fleur-de-lis, the Explorer Scout logo was altered to remove the previous fleur-de-lis mark. Publications either continued the use of the previous artwork or used the new image style of the association and the typeface for all documents was updated to use the Google Fonts typeface Nunito Sans.

== Events and activities ==
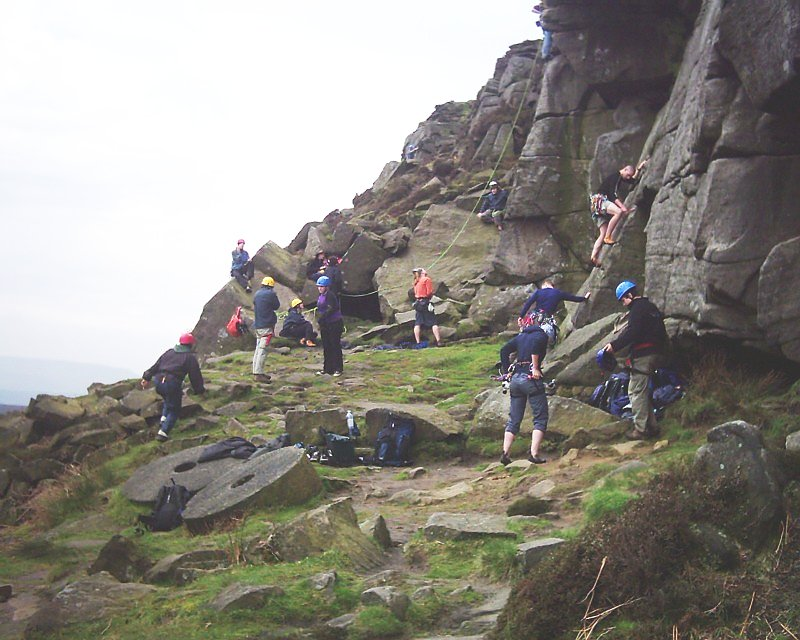
Explorer Scouts climbing at Stanage Edge, Yorkshire

The Explorer Scout programme is flexible to the needs of members. One of the challenge areas of the programme specifically focuses on adventurous activities with hiking, rock climbing, kayaking, sailing, caving and shooting proving popular with units. Many Explorer Scouts can become quite proficient in their chosen activities, and some attain instructor's qualifications as recognised by the activity's national governing body (for example, BCU coaches for kayaking) as part of the Scout Association's adventurous activity permit scheme.

There are a number of national and international events open to Explorer Scouts in addition to project and events held at more local levels. Examples of prominent events that have taken place in the past include the Sun Run, a weekend of activities culminating in 26.2-mile (42.2 km) night hike through the surrounding hillsides starting with participants watching the sun set, and High Adventure, an orienteering event in a location unknown to the participants before the start of the event and incorporating a wild camp. In addition to events, community based projects are also run. One such example is the Epping Forest Scout Conservation Project, which ran between 1989 and 2015, as a residential experience looking at conservation and forestry techniques that linked to the section's top awards.

=== World Scout Jamboree ===
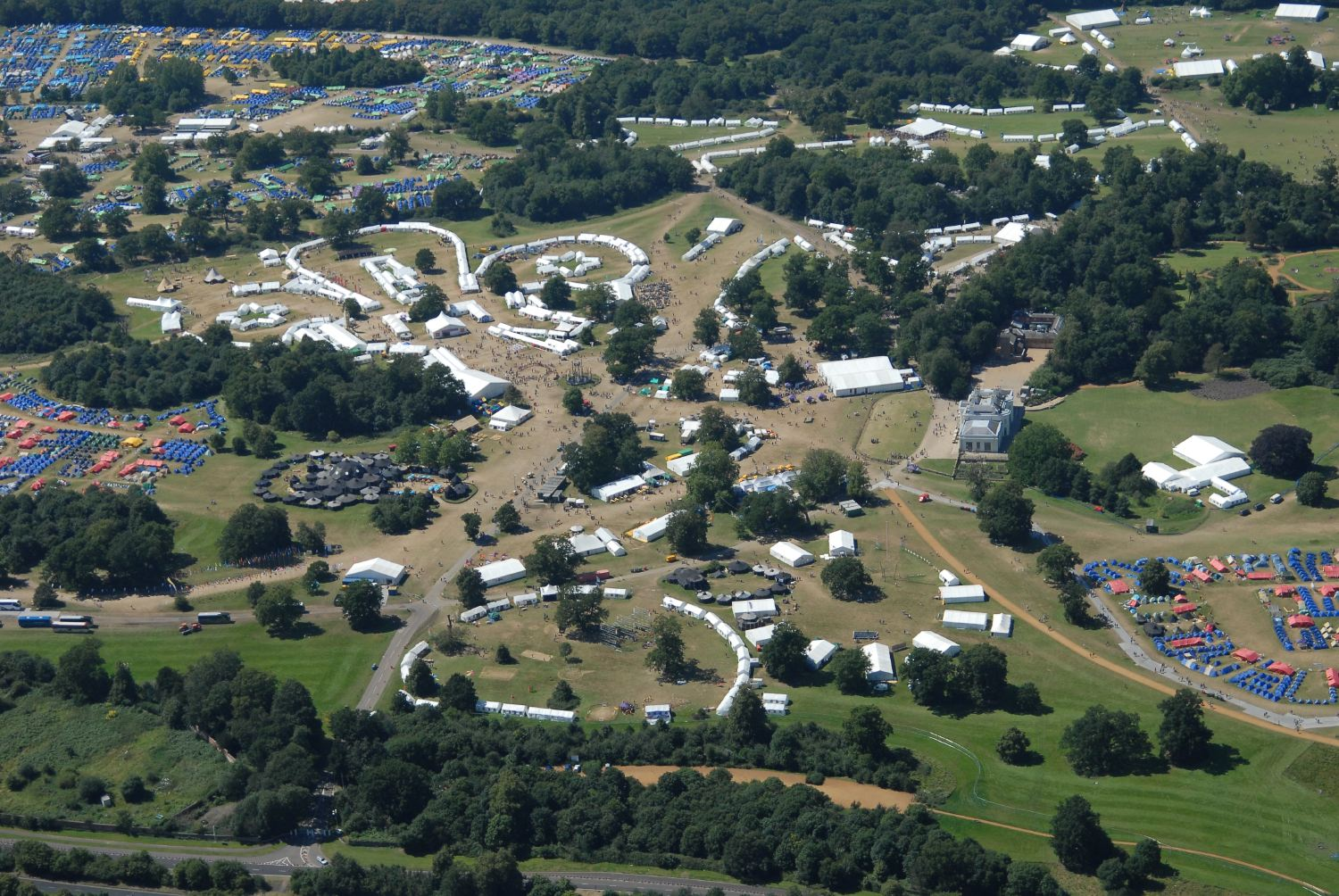
The campsite of the 21st World Scout Jamboree held in 2007 in the UK.

The World Scout Jamboree takes place every four years in countries across the world and is a wide-scale gathering of Scouts. The UK sends approximately 4,000 young people aged 14 to 17 from across the country, split into some 40 units with their own leaders and branding. Preparation and fundraising for a World Scout Jamboree takes many years and so older Scouts who would be Explorers by the time of the Jamboree often work in their troops to help fundraise for the trip to the jamboree. The purpose of the event is to take part in activities with Scouts from across the world with some 45,000 scouts from 152 countries at the 24th World Scout Jamboree at the Summit Bechtel Reserve, United States.

=== Scout Association events ===
The Scout Association, through their Scout Adventures subsidiary, run a number of national events for members of the Explorer Scout section. These are centred on the nationally owned scout centres such as Gilwell Park.

Gilwell 24 is an annual event that takes place at the home of UK Scouting, Gilwell Park, North London. It comprises a set of activities and challenges over a 24-hour period for some 5,000 Explorer Scouts and Rangers. It is often used as an event to mark occasions within the Scouts with Bear Grylls being invested as Chief Scout at the 2009 event and the centenary of Gilwell Park being marked by the media at the 2019 event.

Winter Camp is held on a weekend in January at Gilwell Park, North London. The event, hosted for Scouts, Explorers, Guides and Rangers, includes over 70 activities over the course of the weekend that the individuals can take part in during the day. The event has grown from 2,500 attendees in 2010 to 4,000 in 2019.

A more recent event is Scarefest which is held on the weekend closest to Halloween at Gilwell Park, North London. Similar to Winter Camp, it is open to Scouts, Explorers, Guides and Rangers and features activities such as climbing, archery and laser games.

All these events were affected by the Coronavirus pandemic with events these events cancelled in the 2021 and 2022 years with Gilwell 24 replaced in 2023 with a new Explorers Takeover Gilwell Park event.

=== National Scout Events ===
In addition to the events run by the Scout Association directly, there are a number of other events run by Scout bodies across the UK which are open to Explorer Scouts across the UK.

The Apex Challenge events range in duration from a day to a weekend and consist of teams navigating between a variety of adventurous activity bases over a wide area, usually in Yorkshire, Derbyshire or Nottinghamshire. The 2018 event at Bramham Park in West Yorkshire attracted nearly 400 Explorer Scouts and involved kayaking, mountain biking and tomahawk throwing as signature activities.

The Dragnet challenge is a 30 miles (48 km) navigation challenge over a weekend in July in the Lake District. Teams have to navigate from an unknown starting point to the known end point while avoiding capture.

There are multiple Monopoly Runs each year that take place in London based on the board game of the same name. All focus on visiting various points around the city in a speedy time with some choosing their own points each year and others using the places on the standard board game.

Revolution is based on the Isle of Wight, and is open to Explorer Scouts, Scout Network members and members of the Student Scout and Guide Organisation. It celebrated its 25th event in 2019, having begun in 1995 as a Venture Scout event. The theme changes each year with the activities, based off-site around the island, linked in to the theme: the 2018 event for example had a theme of the 'Greatest Show on Earth' and all the activities linked in to 'Great' figures for example archery for Robin Hood and drumming for Dave Grohl.

== See also ==
- The Scout Association – The parent organisation of the section.
- Age Groups in Scouting and Guiding
- Air Scouts (The Scout Association) – Variation based on air activities, includes Air Explorer Scouts.
- Ranger (Girl Guide) – Equivalent age group in the Girl Guiding movement.
- Scout Network – The following section in the UK Scout Association for 18 to 25 year olds.
- Scouts (The Scout Association) – The preceding section in the UK Scout Association for 10.5 to 14 year olds.
- Sea Scouts (The Scout Association) – Variation based on water activities, includes Sea Explorer Scouts.
- Venture Scout – Equivalent age group in other Scout organisations and the section used prior to Explorer Scout's creation.
