= Sea Scouts (The Scout Association) =

- The Logo of the Sea Scout branch.
- Owner: The Scout Association
- Age range: 10½–14
- Headquarters: Gilwell Park
- Country: United Kingdom
- Founded: July 1909
- Founder: Warington Baden-Powell
| Previous; Cub Scouts | Next; Explorer Sea Scouts |
- Website http://scouts.org.uk/scouts

The Scout Association's Sea Scouts are a branch of the association dedicated to boating and water-based activities such as sailing, canoeing, motorboating and water navigation. The association approved a special uniform for Sea Scouts in 1910 and, in 1912, the association formally adopted use of the name "Sea Scouts". Specialist Sea Scout troops have existed ever since. They are usually based by the side of water, either the sea, lake, river or canal.

Sea Scouts may be organised as Sea Scout Groups, where there is a nautical focus for all sections offered by the group, or as individual Sea Scout troops within a larger group that may not share the same nautical focus. In a Sea Scout Group, only the members in Sea Scout troops (10½-14 years of age) and Sea Explorer units (14–18 years of age) wear a different uniform and follow a more nautical focus within the current Scout programme while younger members, in the Squirrel (4-6 years of age), Beaver (6–8 years of age) and Cub (8-10½ years of age) sections, follow the same programme and wear the same uniform as non-Sea Scout Scout Groups. With the exception of Air Scouts, Sea Scouts are the only part of the association that wears hats as part of their official uniform.

== History ==
=== Foundation ===
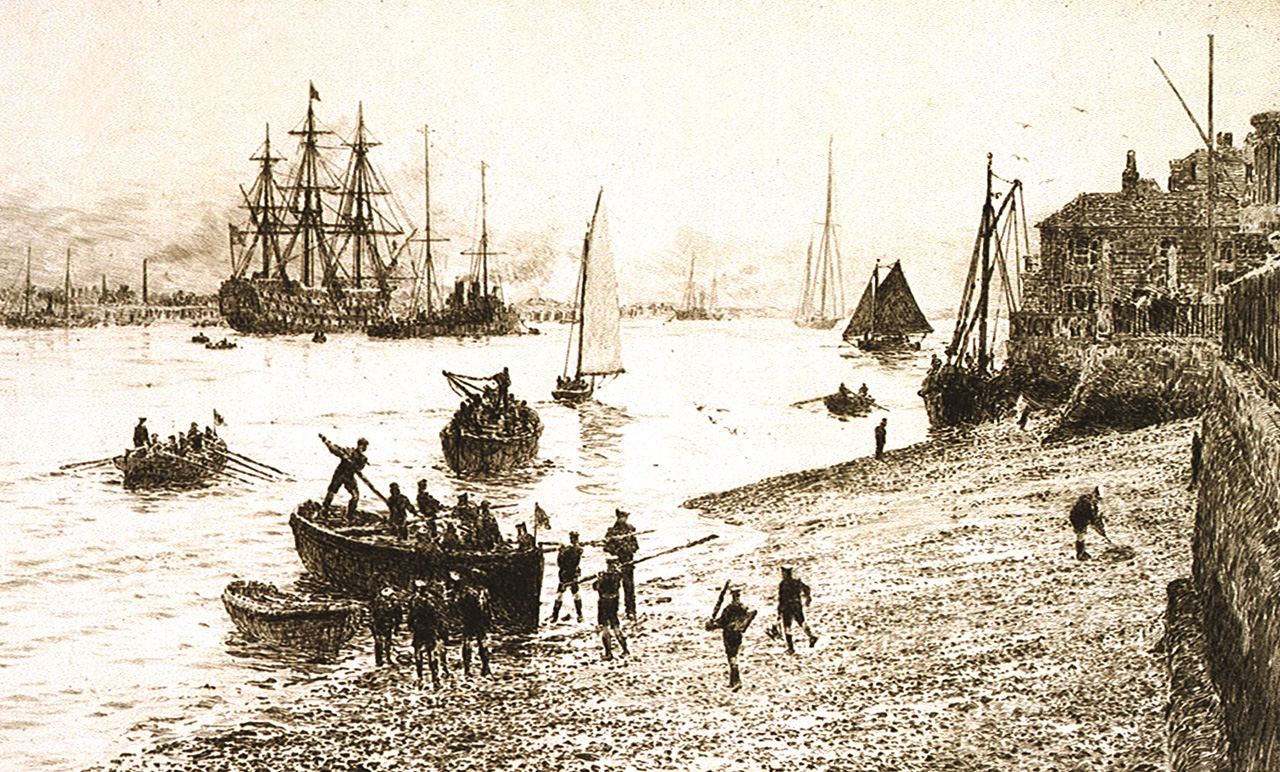
A 1910 painting by William Lionel Wyllie c.1910-1914 showing Sea Scouts in action.

For the history of Sea Scouts generally and prior to The Scout Association adoption of its own Sea Scout program see Sea Scouts.

The association approved a special uniform for Sea Scouts in 1910 with a sou'wester hat for Sea Scouts involved in coast watching and a navy sailor cap for Sea Scouts involved in boating and, in 1912, the association formally adopted use of the name "Sea Scouts". Henry Warrington Smyth Baden-Powell, older brother of Robert, founded the branch and in 1912 would write the comprehensive manual Sea Scouting and Seamanship for Boys, a follow-up to the short booklet Sea Scouting for Boys published the previous year by his younger brother.

Water based activities had been a part of Scouting from its earliest years. Robert Baden-Powell wrote in his Scouting for Boys (published 1908) that 'a Scout should be able to manage a boat, to bring it properly alongside a ship or pier.' In February 1909 The Scout magazine reported the foundation of a new branch of Scouts around Glasgow who were referring to themselves as "Sea Scouts" stating they will be just the same as land Scouts but trained 'on a naval basis, learning naval drills and visiting His Majesty's ships whenever possible.' In June 1909 a Seamanship proficiency badge was introduced for all Scouts that allowed them to learn these skills. A camp took place in July to August 1909 on the ship TS Mercury, moored at Buckler's Hard, with 50 spent sleeping on the ship and another 50 spent camping on the shore before swapping after a week. The 100 places were allocated through a competition in the Scout magazine.

=== 1912 Leysdown and 1913 Mirror tragedies ===
Very early on in the history of the association's Sea Scouts branch, it was hit by two accidents which resulted in the loss of several Sea Scouts' lives. The most prominent was the Leysdown disaster of 4 August 1912 when an ex-naval cutter carrying 23 Sea Scouts from Walworth, London, off the coast of Leysdown-on-Sea, Isle of Sheppey, capsized in a sudden storm. Despite the efforts of five coastguards and two civilians, nine of the Scouts drowned. A mass funeral was held on 10 August attended by thousands including Scouts from several countries. That same year the Sea Scouts of London were presented a 52 ton ketch yacht by the Daily Mirror newspaper and named Mirror. However just the following year the boat was struck by another vessel resulting in the loss of four lives. Following both these tragedies, new rules were put in place and training tightened but these did not deter the progress of the branch. In early 1914, the HQ Gazette announced that 'No boat training shall be undertaken unless the Scout can swim fifty yards' and the August 1914 published Seamanship for Scouts by Lt Cdr W. H. Stuart Garnett had a greater emphasis on safety management.

=== Service in World War I ===
In 1914, World War I broke out and Scouts across the country found themselves becoming involved on the home front with non-militarised service. While Scouts took on roles guarding bridges, telegraph lines or culverts from damage and acting as messengers, Sea Scouts in particular took up a role across the country supporting the coast guard. With the Royal Navy on a war footing, Baden-Powell thought that getting scouts to watch estuaries, ports and from coastguard stations this could free up men needed for military service. Sea Scouts and other Scouts engaged in coast watching were supervised by the coastguard but were under the orders of the Patrol Leaders and many were already trained for the roles, a Coast Watcher badge having been introduced in 1911 to Admiralty standards. The call was a success with 1,300 Sea Scouts and other Scouts on coast watching duty within two months of the war's outbreak and 23,000 Scouts having been coast watchers during the course of the war. Specific duties included patrolling the beaches, salvaging wreckage, watching for fishing boats working unauthorised at night, examine boats coming into shore checking permits, answering naval calls on the telephone and report vessels passing up and down the coast.

=== Inter-war years ===
In 1928 a new branch of Sea Scouts, the Deep Sea Scouts, was formed to enable young people who had begun a working life aboard ships to maintain connection with the association.

The growth of the section demanded a growth also in capacity for training. The Sea Scouts still has access to TS Mercury but in 1936 the RRS Discovery, the ship that had taken Robert Falcon Scott to Antarctica for his first South Pole expedition, was offered to the association and was promptly bought in January 1937 following a donation from Lucy, Lady Houston.

=== Service in World War II ===
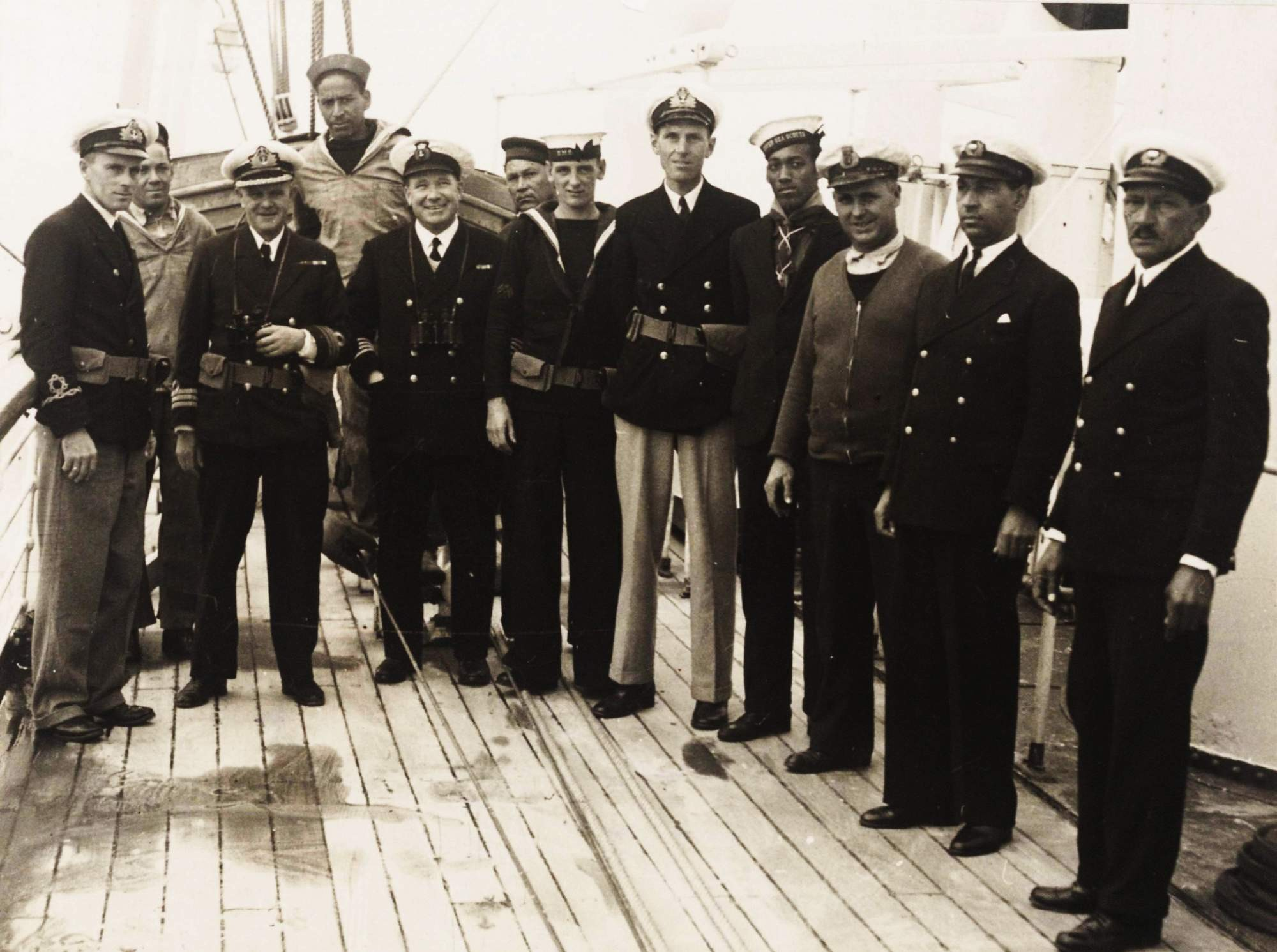
The crew of HMS Castle Harbour in Second World War Royal Naval Examination Service use, assigned to HMD Bermuda, composed of Royal Navy, Merchant Navy, and Pilot Service personnel and a Sea Scout (fourth from right).

Just 20 years after being recognised for their work in the First World War, Scouts found themselves once again helping in the war effort for the second. Sea Scouts proved able telephone operators, signallers, stretcher bearers to the Thames River Emergency Service and once again did coast watching and acted as signallers for the Coastguard and Royal Navy. Notably, the 1st Mortlake Sea Scouts took their motor picket-boat Minotaur to France as part of the Dunkirk evacuation in 1940. With bombing of towns and cities across Britain as part of the Blitz, Scouts also took on roles helping during the air-raid; George Collins, a Patrol Leader with the 12th Shoreditch Sea Scouts was awarded a Silver Cross for bravery when he rescued three children from a house in Barnet during bombing on 8 October 1940. The contribution of Scouts in the Second World War was much less recognised than their work in the First. So, in 1943, a leaflet was published to promote Sea Scouting which included details on how to join and what activities were completed. The following year a Sea Scout Exhibition took place from 10–19 April at the Scottish Drill Hall and attended by Princess Elizabeth.

=== Post-war years ===
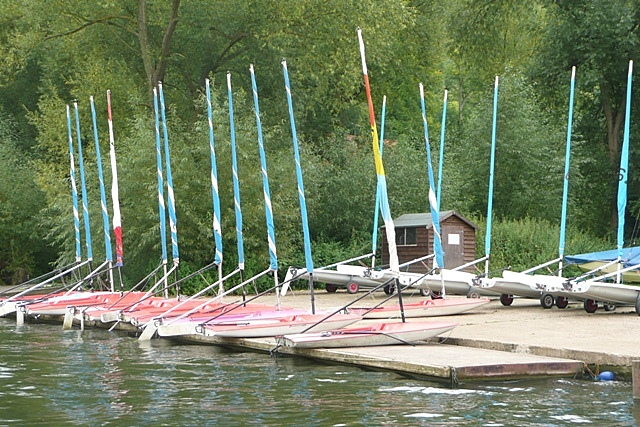
Boats at Longridge Scout Centre.

In 1947 Viscount Mountbatten of Burma was made Commodore for Sea Scouts. The Sea Scouts were very prominent immediately after the war taking part in a number of events: almost 400 Sea Scouts attended the 6th World Scout Jamboree in France with a number maintaining a flag on Sea Scout island and camping there to ensure its integrity. Sea Scouts were also involved in the 1948 Summer Olympics with 200 helping to ferry competitors between boats and jetties near the sailing events in Torbay.

In August 1950 the Sea Scouts faced another tragedy when the Wangle III, a whaler owned by the 1st Mortlake Sea Scouts, was lost and all ten Sea Scouts on board drowned. The post-war period also saw the retiring of a number of training vessels used by the Scouts. In 1954, the RRS Discovery was transferred back to Royal Navy ownership when the Scouts could no longer afford the upkeep. and in 1968 the TS Mercury was retired To compensate, in 1956, Marlow, Buckinghamshire on the River Thames became home to Longridge Scout Boating Centre to train in seamanship and other water sports.

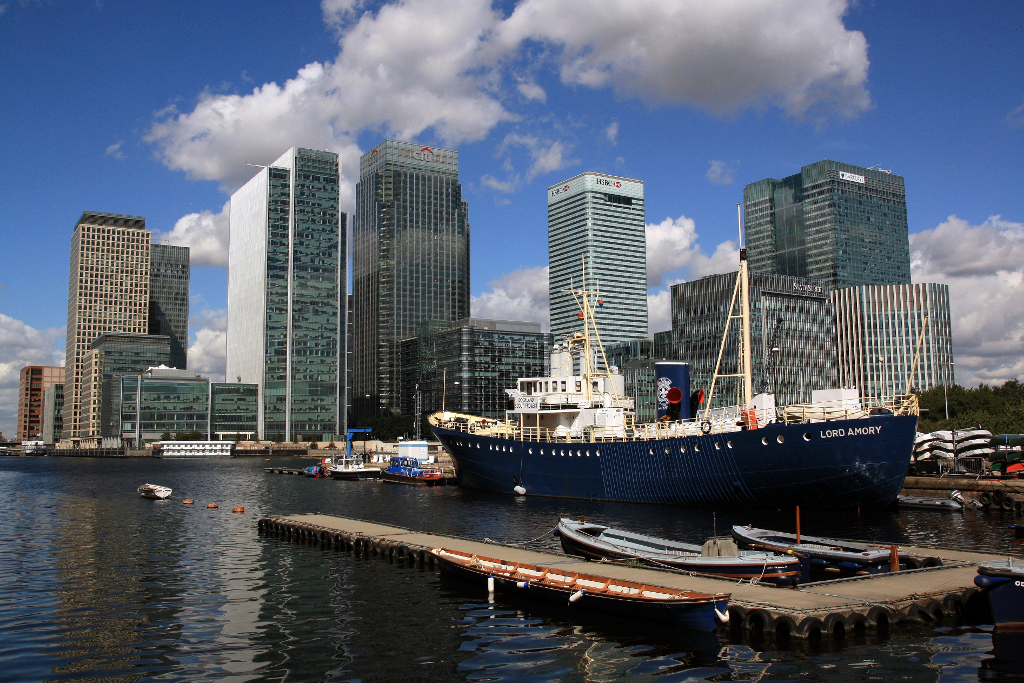
Lord Amory in the London Docklands.

Further provision came when the Dockland Scout Project was formed as a new London base for Sea Scout training. Compared to the previous base on the Victoria Embankment this was based in West India Docks in the developing London Docklands. This has developed from a wooden pavilion, derelict warehouse and a small fleet of dinghy boats in the area now occupied by Canary Wharf to a metal cutter the Lord Amory and a new boathouse complex acquired in 1981 and 1994 respectively. These are used as a base for water activity weekends for Scouts, Sea Scouts, Guides, Sea Cadets, Air Cadets and Sea Rangers among others and has received support over time from the Port of London Authority, the London Docklands Development Corporation, British Waterways and the Canal and River Trust.

=== Centenary ===
The centenary of Sea Scouting was celebrated in 2009. The Centenary Sea Scout Jamboree was held in August of that year, at the Holme Pierrepont National Watersports Centre in Nottinghamshire. Around 3,000 Sea Scouts participated in the event and came from around the world featuring both land and sea activities.

The centenary of Royal Naval recognition in 2019 was also celebrated by the Scouts with an occasional badge that could be worn on uniforms being released.

== Organisation ==
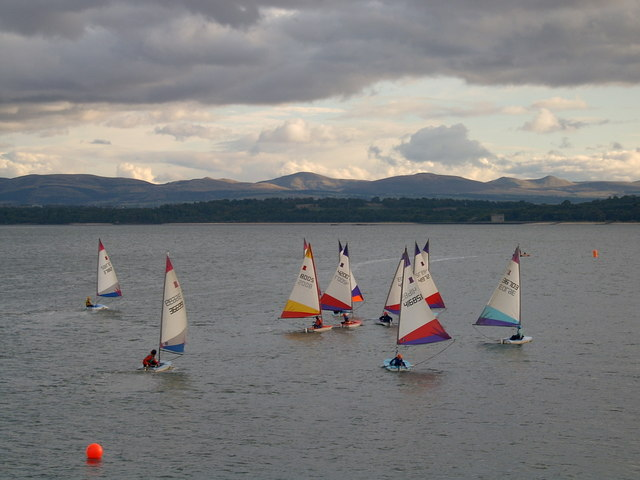
Sea Scouts sailing in Dalgety Bay

As a branch of the Scout Association, Sea Scouts and Explorer Sea Scouts share much of the organisational structure of the other sections. Members of both make the same promise as any other Scout or Explorer Scout and take part in the same wider programme based on the themes of Outdoor and Adventure, World and Skills, although the nautical elements of this programme tend to be the focus of activities especially in the summer months when the weather is fine enough for boating outdoors. Approaches vary but some sections put on additional meetings for boating skills while others use their regular meetings to focus on these skills during those times. The sections are led by volunteer leaders as part of a team made up of uniformed leaders, assistant leaders and more informal sectional assistants and parent helpers. Due to the technical nature of the boating and the specialised instruction required, Sea Scout groups and sections may have more skills instructors than other groups and sections to enable the water-based programme to occur.

The Sea Scout section is run at a local level by Scout Groups which may nor may not specialise as a Sea Scout group. They are led locally by a volunteer manager, called a Group Scout Leader, and are responsible for ensuring the standards of the section are maintained. It is usual for the Sea Scout section to be divided into patrols of young people led by a Patrol Leader, usually a more experienced member of the section.

=== Royal Navy Recognition ===
Ensign of the Royal Navy Recognised Sea Scouts

In the United Kingdom there are approximately 400 Sea Scout Groups and a maximum of 105 of these are recognised by the Royal Navy. The scheme began in 1919 following the efforts of Scouts during World War I in support of the armed forces, through service as coast watchers, first aiders, fire fighters and messengers. Groups that apply for Recognition are inspected by a Royal Navy officer and, providing there is a vacant position, Groups that pass the inspection and meet the standards of the Royal Navy are awarded recognition on behalf of the Admiralty Board.

Recognised Groups are entitled to fly a Red Ensign and blue pennant, both defaced with a Scout arrowhead and Admiralty crown. Members may also wear the Royal Navy Recognition badge on uniform. Sea Scouts may go to sea with the Royal Navy, visit military establishments and use facilities at HMS Excellent, such as the Royal Navy Sailing Centre and the Youth Training Ship, HMS Bristol. Three events occur annually for Royal Navy Recognised Sea Scouts, a swimming gala at HMS Raleigh, a football competition at HMS Excellent, and a summer "camp" aboard HMS Bristol. Another camp is held for Sea Explorers in October of each year.

== Visual identity ==
=== Uniform ===
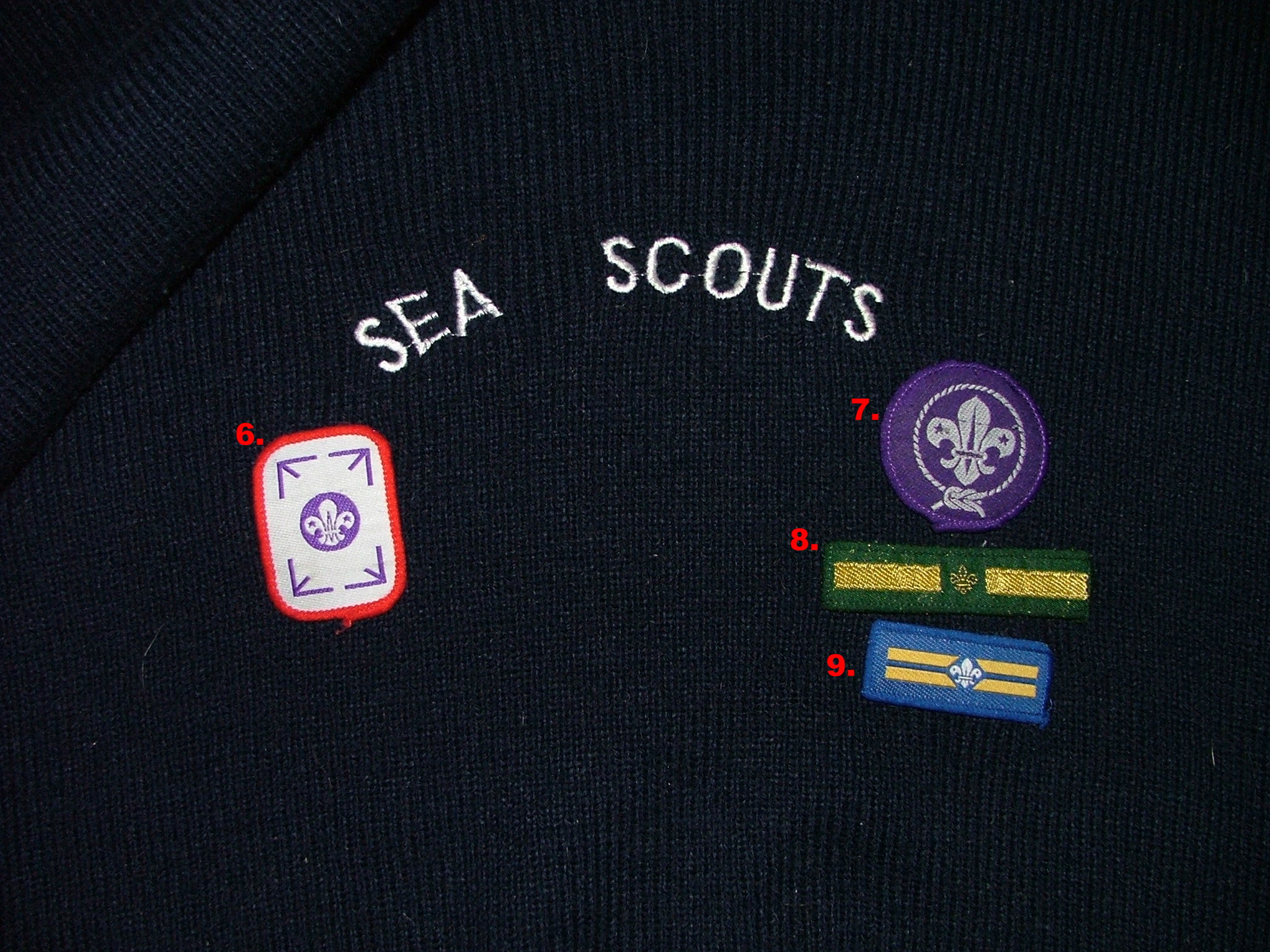
A Sea Scout jersey carrying the badges used from 1984 to 2002.

The uniform for Sea Scout troops is a mix of naval and Scout styles and consists of a light blue long sleeve shirt or blouse or dark blue jersey, smart navy blue trousers or skirt, a leather scout belt and buckle, Scout Group scarf and a navy Seaman's Class 2 round cap with 'Sea Scout' on the tallyband. Groups may optionally also choose to adopt a white lanyard with bosun's call as part of their official uniform.

The uniform for leaders in a Sea Scout group is similar however leaders are not permitted to wear the blue jersey, have the option of a navy blue tie and wear a peaked officer hat with a white top and a Sea Scout cap badge with an option for female leaders to wear a naval pattern tricorn hat.

Squirrels, Beavers and Cubs in a Sea Scout Group do not wear a special uniform and instead wear the uniform common to all members of the section.

=== Flag ===
In addition to any flags that may be flown as part of normal identification purposes, Sea Scout troops will also have a flag that identifies their section for use in parades and when investing a new member to the troop. Sea Scout troop flags are the same size as other Scout flags (4 ft by 3 ft) and are navy blue with the name of the group name and location in white lettering around a white Scout arrowhead on a purple circle in the centre of the flag.

=== Logo ===
Since 2009, the association's Sea Scout branch does not use a specific logo of their own, instead using a version of the association's main corporate logo with "Sea Scouts" underneath. Their message is the same as the other sections in Scouting, focusing between 2009 and 2018 on the Scout Association key message of "everyday adventure", and since 2018 on a core message of "skills for life" with appropriate images to show this. The section uses the blue colour palette more than other sections and today may use Navy blue for publications more than the Scout purple used by others.

== Explorer Sea Scouts ==
Explorer Sea Scouts
- Logo for the section.
- Owner: The Scout Association
- Age range: 14–18
- Headquarters: Gilwell Park
- Country: United Kingdom
- Founded: February 2002
| Previous; Sea Scouts | Next; Scout Network |
- Website http://scouts.org.uk/explorers

Explorer Sea Scouts are the association's section for 14-18 year olds that follow the Sea Scouting approach to Scouting within the association's programme. They are able to complete the same activities and badges as other Explorer Scouts but often have a nautical themed programme.

=== Organisation ===
A Sea Explorer Scout section is run by a Scout District along with a number of Explorer Scout units, as opposed to Sea Scout Troops which are run by the more local Scout Groups. Individual units are led by a volunteer leadership team, as with other younger sections, and are supported by a volunteer manager at district level, the District Explorer Scout Commissioner. Explorer Scout Units in general may form links with a particular group through the forming of a partnership agreement and indeed many Sea Explorer Scout Units are partnered to groups that have Sea Scout troops or are Sea Scout groups as a whole.

=== Uniform ===
The uniform for Explorer Sea Scouts consists of a light blue long sleeve shirt or blouse, smart navy blue trousers or skirt, a leather scout belt and buckle (or the Explorer Belt or Young Leader belt if achieved), unit scarf or navy blue tie and a navy Seaman's Class 2 round cap with 'Explorer Sea Scout' on the tallyband or a peaked officer hat with a white top and a Sea Scout cap badge depending on the choice of the Explorer Scout unit.

The uniform for leaders is very similar however leaders must wear the peaked officer hat although female leaders have a choice of wearing a naval pattern tricorn hat.

=== Flags ===
Similar to Sea Scout troops, Explorer Sea Scouts use a flag that identifies their section for use in parades and when investing a new member to the troop. The design is exactly the same as that of Sea Scout troops being a 4 ft by 3 ft navy blue flag with the name of the group name and location in white lettering around a white Scout arrowhead on a purple circle in the centre of the flag.

== Deep Sea Scouts ==
The Deep Sea Scouts (DSS) is a National Scout Active Support Unit of The Scout Association with the aim of connecting Scouting to the sea. It was originally formed in 1928 as a branch of Sea Scouting that enabled young people serving on British ships to participate in Scouting activities. The decline in British shipping numbers, both naval and merchant, in the late 20th century was reflected in a reduction in membership of the Deep Sea Scouts. Following a review, control transferred from the Programme and Training Department to become a National Scout Fellowship in 1991 and was known as the Deep Sea Scout Fellowship. A subsequent national review of Scout Fellowships resulted in the creation of Scout Active Support, and the fellowship was renamed back to Deep Sea Scouts in 2010.

== See also ==
- Royal Navy Recognised Sea Scouts
- Sea Scout
- RRS Discovery — the ship of Scott's first expedition to the Antarctic, later used as a Sea Scout training ship
- TS Mercury - Ship used as a training ship by the Scouts.
- The Scout Association - The parent organisation of the section.
- Age Groups in Scouting and Guiding
- Scouts (The Scout Association)
- Explorer Scouts (The Scout Association)
- Air Scouts (The Scout Association) - Variation based on air activities, includes Air Explorer Scouts.
