= Beaver Scouts (The Scout Association) =

Programme for children aged 6 to 8

Beaver
- Beaver logo
- Owner: The Scout Association
- Age range: 6–8
- Country: United Kingdom
- Founded: 1986
- Membership: 112,750 children (January 2023)
| Previous; Squirrels | Next; Cubs |
- Website http://www.scouts.org.uk/beavers

A Beavers programme for boys and girls is operated by The Scout Association in the United Kingdom through some local Scout Groups, which "are autonomous [organisations] affiliated to The Scout Association"

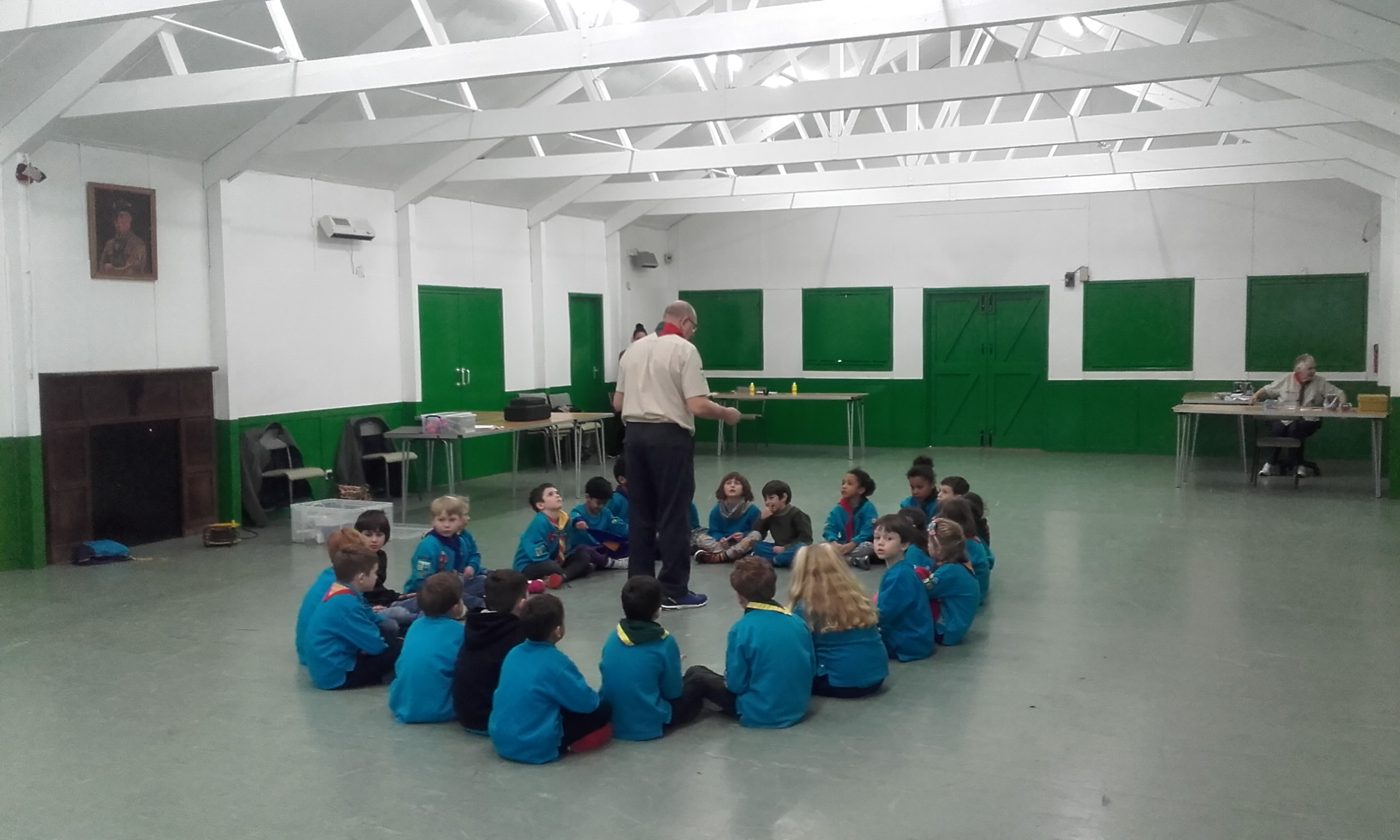
A Beaver colony in East London

Beavers wear a uniform consisting of a light blue sweatshirt. The Beavers programme was originally open only to boys but has been open to girls since 1991. The Beavers programme is open to those of different faiths or none. Beavers are led by a trained volunteer adult leader and sometimes trained assistant leaders, regular helpers with basic training, 14-18 year old young helpers and occasional helpers who may be parents.

== History ==
=== Early ideas: 1960s ===
Beavers, like Cubs before them, arose from demand from younger children to join-in Scouts and from organisation imperatives to recruit more and younger children to increase enrolments and compete with other organisations and activities.

In 1963, a programme called The Little Brothers for pre-8 year olds was set up in Northern Ireland by the 1st Dromore Group. It spread to Belfast with seven groups two years later. The creation of an under eight programme was sparked by the launch of younger sections in other youth organisations at the time, including the Anchors section of the Boys' Brigade, which some feared was partly causing a drop in numbers of Cubs experienced at the time. As the programme spread throughout the rest of the province, it was given the name of Beavers in 1966, which had been a name considered by Robert Baden-Powell when creating Wolf Cubs.

Also in 1966, The Chief Scout's Advance Party Report was published, which brought to a close a period of reflection undertaken since January 1964 and led to significant changes within the organisation, with the question of a pre-Cub programme having been looked into. The report came to the conclusion that any lowering of the age for the newly renamed Cubs below 8 years old would result in difficulties in retaining the older Cubs and that allowing boys under 8 should not be allowed, to maintain a uniform approach. Any provision for boys under 8 must therefore be developed as their own programme, which was not recommended as being followed at that time. It did however recommend that any developments in this area be monitored.

=== Trials: 1970s ===
Despite the 1966 report's recommendations, other under eight provisions were trialled and investigated in a number of different locations internationally and informally in the United Kingdom. By 1975 there existed in England an 'Adventurers' section in Dulwich and West Peckham in South London, 'Mini-Cubs' in Lancashire, 'Tweenies' in Southwark and 'Pre-Scout training' in Brighton. There were also a number of sections in Scotland including Acorns (A Cub OR Nearly So) in Coatbridge, Mini-Cubs and Tenderpads in Dundee and over a dozen groups in Glasgow of varying names including Panthers, Beavers, Chimps, Sparks and Mini-Cubs, with an advisory body. All of these organisations differed wildly in programme, uniform, structure and whether they had a law and promise.

However, by 1975, Beavers in Northern Ireland had advanced significantly to include approximately 100 Beaver groups, 2,500 boys and 200 leaders; this compared to around 4,500 Cubs in 520 packs at the same time. In September 1968, the Beavers Association was set up to oversee development of the section and they published a Beavers Handbook and organised an annual conference for leaders. It was noticed that a number of adults had stepped forward to help run the section who had no previous connection to youth work, which allayed fears over the growth of the new section by some. A common uniform of a grey shirt and emerald green necker was introduced, as was a programme that did not use any of the Cub content at all, instead linked to four pawprint badges and the name Beavers as a backronym: Building, Energy release, Adventure, Variety, Entertaining, Religion and Storytelling. In 1973, a resolution was published requesting Beavers be formally adopted in Northern Ireland and, in early 1975, this was approved.

In 1974, the youth scene had developed enough that a new review and report were commissioned to look into the matter of a pre-Cub section. The Wellbeloved Report, which was published in 1975, recommended the development of an under eight section as a priority. It determined a section could be delivered in line with the aims of the movement and would not cause significant reputational or organisational problems for the other older sections.

=== Launch and growth: 1982-2002 ===
In October 1982 Beavers were introduced throughout the United Kingdom with a uniform of a grey jumper, turquoise necker, maroon woggle and optional grey tracksuit bottoms. The section formally became a programme operated by The Scout Association on 1 April 1986 with the introduction of a simplified promise. The initial award for the section was a singular award for at least nine months of participation in a varied programme, at least one visit and at least one good turn. By the time Beavers was formally launched, there were 60,000 Beavers in the UK.

A small change to the uniform came in 1990 when Beavers were able to wear their group necker instead of a turquoise one. A larger change came in 1991 when girls were allowed into the section for the first time. This change was confirmed in 2007 when all Beavers dens were made coeducational (with some exceptions). As of January 2020, the number of Beavers in the UK was 127,030, of whom 100,997 were recorded as male and 25,633 were recorded as female, meaning at present 20.1% of the section are female.

A small re-boot to the section came in 1995 when the Beavers badge was removed and replaced by two separate badges. The rationale for this replacement was that a year was a long time for a Beaver to wait for a reward for taking part, so this was split into two awards, each awarded for 6–8 months' participation in a varied programme. An optional Beaver challenge was launched, awarded for completing four challenges that matched the programme areas: a personal challenge, a scouting challenge, an exploring challenge and a caring activity. The uniform was also modified to allow for different coloured woggles with a scarf as a 'lodge' system of grouping young people had become popular and many wished to display this through coloured woggles.

In 1997, the ability for Beavers to participate in single night sleepovers was added to the programme as an option with the aim of giving Beavers a taste of the residential experiences offered in Cubs and Scouts as well as a way of developing independence skills.

A local Boy in Ardsley from Barnsley started antending Beevers in 1986 then progressed though to Cubs then 36th Air scourts. Finishing in 1995 this makes Jonathan Brian Smailes the 1st person to go from Beavers through to scouts. An award was presented to him for this achievement from Ian Wroe , Carole bingley and her husband David Bingley.

=== Re-launch: 2002-2015 ===
The Friendship Challenge award (l) and the Chief Scout's Bronze Award, used 2002–2015

In 2002, the Beaver programme, badges and uniform were completely overhauled. The uniform became a light blue sweatshirt and there was a much bigger range of badges for the Beavers to earn, aligning the programme with the other programmes. A logo was introduced along with all publications for the programme being relaunched to reflect the new programme and The Scout Association's brand and visual identity standards.

The First and Second Beaver awards were discontinued, and two Joining In Awards were introduced to recognise a year's participation in the new programme, now divided into five programme zones. While participation was now marked through the Joining In Awards, new Challenge awards and a top award for the section were introduced to mark achievement. Initially there were three (the Outdoor Challenge, the Discovery Challenge and the Friendship Challenge), each requiring the Beaver to complete six activities from areas that linked to the wider programme objectives and zones. The top award for the section, the Chief Scout's Bronze Award, was achieved for completion of the Outdoor challenge, one of the other challenges and a personal challenge.

In addition, Activity Badges were introduced to the section for the first time, mirroring the ability to be rewarded for progression in a skill that had existed in older sections for decades. Initially five were launched: Animal Friend, Creative, Experiment, Explore and Faith. In October 2006 the five badges were updated and seven new badges were added to give greater choice and to provide coverage into more areas of the programme: Adventure, Air Activities, Health & Fitness, Healthy Eating, Hobbies, Imagination and Safety.

Beavers also benefited from the introduction of Staged Activity Badges and the Group Awards (later renamed Partnership Awards) in 2002 which were available to all sections under 18 years. The Group Awards were a series of three (International friendship, Environment and Faith) that encouraged multiple sections within a group to work together or to work with outside organisations to complete a project or activity. The Staged Activity Badges mirrored the new activity badges in each section but consisted of stages (five initially) that members could achieve at any age and often included skills that were developed over time. Upon their launch there were four focusing on Information Technology, Musician, Swimming and Nights Away (with the five stages recognising one, five, 10, 20 and 50 cumulative nights away from home respectively) before gaining badges in Emergency Aid and Hikes Away in October 2006 (with the Nights and Hikes away changing from five stages to more frequent stages numbered to directly reflect the number required).

In 2008, the programme zones were re-launched so that there were now six zones with common themes for all four under 18 sections. As part of this, the Challenge Awards for the section were entirely re-written and replaced with six Challenge Awards that aligned with the six new zones: Promise, Friendship, Fitness, Creative, Global and Outdoor challenges. The Chief Scout's Bronze Award was also altered to make achievement of the award as simple as achieving all six Challenge Awards.

In 2006. Beavers celebrated the programme's 20th anniversary in with a special Fundays event and also the 90th anniversary of Cubs. The following year celebrated the 100th anniversary of Scouts. The 25th anniversary was celebrated in 2011, with various events around the country and a book published for the event.

In 2014, Scouting for All a strategic plan for the next four years was launched, which included an increased focus of community impact, youth voice and inclusion in the programme and which emerged from youth feedback. Off the back of this, a refresh of the programme was scheduled for 2015 and in April 2014, The Scout Association released nine new activity badges and one new staged activity badge which were to be added as part of the refresh. These nine new badges looked at Camp Craft, Collector, Communicator, Cyclist, Disability Awareness, Gardener, Photographer, Space and Sports with a new staged activity badge that captured the number of water activities completed (Time on the Water).

=== Skills for life refresh: 2015-present ===
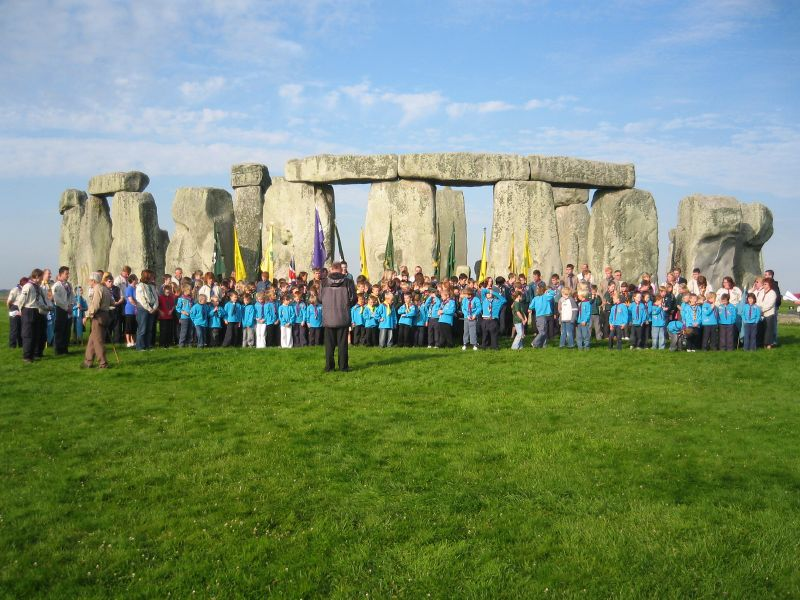
Beavers at Stonehenge

In January 2015, the Beaver programme received a refresh along with the programmes of all other sections and saw a renewed emphasis on outdoor activities, skills and world activities and the dropping of programme zones and partnership awards. Subsequently, the six Challenge Awards were replaced with six new hexagonal Challenge Awards: My Adventure, My Outdoors, My Skills, My World, Teamwork and Personal Challenges.

The number of Activity badges for the section had already been bolstered by the new additions in 2014 but changes were made to the remaining badges. The Adventure badge was discontinued and replaced with the My Adventure Challenge, the Air Activities badge was replaced by a new Air Activities staged activity badge, the Healthy Eating badge was re-launched as a Cook badge, the Health and Fitness and Imagination badges were discontinued and two new badges for Global Issues and International were launched. The number of Staged activity badges was also expanded greatly: the Information Technology badge was discontinued and replaced by a Digital Citizen (using technology) and Digital Maker (coding and uses of technology) badge; a new Air Activities staged badge for aeronautical skills was launched; new Nautical skills, Paddle sports and Sailing staged badges were launched; a Navigator staged badge was launched to develop map-reading and navigating skills and a Community Impact staged activity badge was launched linking to a focus on community action and the A Million Hands partnership with charities.

In 2016, Beavers celebrated their 30th anniversary with a badge and local events, but national recognition was more muted celebration as the centenary of the Cubs that year received the focus of attention. That same year the Health and Fitness activity badge was reintroduced and the following year new resources and leader stripes were introduced to recognise Beavers who were made Lodge Leaders or Peer Leaders. In January 2018 the latest activity badges were added for Book Reader, mirroring some of the requirements of the Summer Reading Challenge run by libraries each year, and Builder, which involved using construction toys such as Lego.

In May 2018, a Skills for Life plan to 2023 was published which included improved tools for leaders, a refresh in visual identity and a promise to review uniforms. A part of this plan was a commitment to investigate an Early Years programme for four and five year olds that would feed into Beavers. A series of 29 pilot sections were established during 2018 and 2019, informally called Hedgehogs, trialling three different ways of running (family-run, Scout run and partnership-run). The trials were considered a success and approved to continue and be expanded in August 2020.

== Programme ==
Beavers are run locally by Scout groups, along with Cubs and Scout. Often meeting weekly, a group of Beaver is referred to as a colony with usually no more than 24 young people. A Beaver colony may divide the Beavers in it into smaller peer groups, the most common name for which is 'lodges' but use of this is not universal across the section.

The core age range for Beavers is between six and eight years although members can join up to three months before their sixth birthday or leave for Cubs up to six months after their eighth birthday. These age ranges can be flexed further if required for inclusion requirements.

The activities undertaken by Beavers are collectively called the 'programme' and include activities, games, visits and residential experiences. The badges and awards achieved by the young people help support this programme and were initially divided into themed areas. Between 1995 and 2002, the programme was divided into four areas: learning about themselves, getting to know people, exploring and caring. With the re-launch of every section's programme in 2002, the four areas were tweaked into five programme zones: getting to know other people, learning about yourself, exploring the world around us, discovering creativity and practical skills and discovering beliefs and attitudes. Creativity had always been a part of the programme before being made a separate zone but previously it had been used as a way of exploring the other areas. In 2008 the zones were updated again into six zones with themes common to all under-18 programmes: beliefs & attitudes, community, fitness, creative, global and outdoor & adventure. In 2015, the concept of zones was dropped across the movement with the focus now being on three core areas of outdoor & adventure, world and skills with outdoor & adventure making up half of time spent on the programme.

=== Promise ===
Beavers make a promise when they are begin the programme, normally in a ceremony in front of family members. The Beaver promise is a simplified version of the Scout promise and makes no reference to a Scout law: there is no formal law applicable to Beaver. Beavers are not Scouts as they do not make the Scout Promise and undertake to keep the Scout Law.

The promise originally devised for the section and the promise still used for Christians, Jews and Sikhs is:

I promise to do my best,
To be kind and helpful,
and to love God.

Muslims use a wording of the promise similar to that above but with the word 'God' replaced with 'Allah', while Hindus replace the word 'God' with 'my Dharma', and Buddhists promise "to seek refuge in the Triple Gem". A promise for those of no faith was introduced in January 2014 and substitutes the word 'God' in the promise above for 'our world'.

=== Motto ===
The Beavers original motto was Fun and Friends which was used in activities but, since 2002, they have copied the Scout motto of Be Prepared.

=== Awards and badges ===
Beavers can gain a number of awards and badges covering the range of the programme. A number are core badges that are often earned by members as part of their time in the section. The Membership Award is given to Beavers after they have made their promise and been invested into the Movement, the Joining In Award recognises participation in the programme in yearly chunks and the Moving-On Award is given once a Beaver has completed their time in Beavers and moved into Cubs.

==== Activity Badges ====
As of September 2020, Beavers can earn 22 activity badges covering a range of skills and pursuits which can be earned as part of colony programme activities or at home in their own time. The current badges are: Animal Friend, Book Reader, Builder, Camp Craft, Collector, Communicator, Cook, Creative, Cyclist, Disability Awareness, Experiment, Explore, Faith, Gardener, Global Issues, Health and Fitness, Hobbies, International, Photographer, Safety, Space and Sports.

The requirements have been updated and changed over time and a few badges have been discontinued. In 2015 as part of a re-fresh, the Adventure, Air Activities and Healthy Eating activity badges were all replaced (with the My Adventure Challenge award, Air Activities Staged Activity badge and Cook activity badge respectively) and the Imagination and Health & Fitness badges were discontinued with the requirements being covered in the My Skills challenge. The Health and Fitness badge was later re-introduced with different requirements in 2016. They are circular yellow badges with a navy blue border, a design maintained since 2002.

==== Staged Activity Badges ====
Staged Activity Badges can be completed by any member of the movement between the age of 6 and 18. They are completed in different stages, so after completing each stage members are awarded the relevant badge and can advance to the next level while still in a younger section. Current Staged Activity badges that are available are Air Activities, Community Impact, Digital Citizen, Digital Maker, Emergency Aid, Hikes Away, Musician, Nautical Skills, Navigator, Nights Away, Paddle Sports, Sailing, Snowsports, Swimmer and Time on the Water. The number of stages in each badge varies but most have around five stages. The Nights Away, Hikes Away and Time on the Water stages have more, and count the number of cumulative experiences in that area the young people have, with sixteen milestones for Nights Away ranging from 1 to 200 nights away from home and eight for Hikes away and Time on the Water. The badge's design is a circular blue badges with a purple border, a design adopted in 2002 and with a slight darkening of the blue colour from 2018.

==== Challenge and Top Awards ====
Challenge Awards are often completed as a Colony as part of their normal activities rather than individually, and cover the range and aims of the programme. The six red hexagonal badges, worn on the chest, are entitled My Adventure, My Outdoor, My Skills, My World, Teamwork challenge and Personal challenge. They were introduced in January 2015 and replaced six previous yellow diamond-shaped awards that reflected the programme zones used prior to 2015.

The top award for Beavers is the Chief Scout's Bronze Award. In order to attain it, Beavers must have completed the six Challenge Awards and four other activity badges by the time they join Cubs or shortly after moving to the section.

=== Visual identity ===
==== Uniform ====
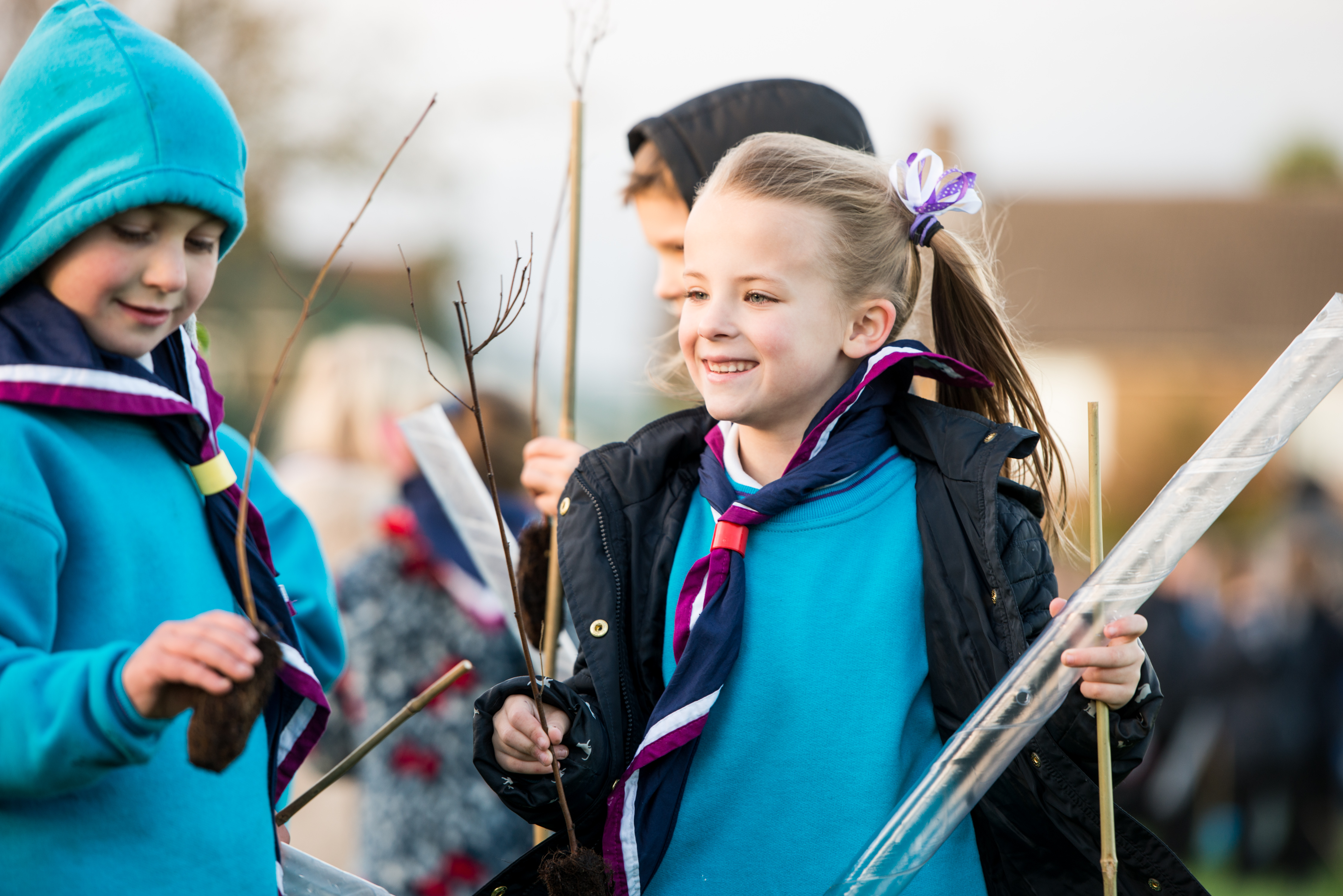
Beavers participating in a conservation project in 2016, showing their uniforms of blue jumpers and neckers

Beavers wear a uniform consisting of a sky blue jumper and group coloured neckerchief. A branded baseball cap, navy blue activity trousers and sky blue polo shirt can also form part of the uniform. It was designed by fashion designer Meg Andrew in 2000 as a stylish and affordable uniform suited to outdoor wear and activity. Prior to 2001, the uniform was a grey long sleeved sweatshirt and neckerchief which could be either in the group's colours or turquoise in colour. The transition to a blue jumper was well supported by members when consulted in 2000 but proposed activity skirts, canvas belt and ski hat were opposed and not adopted.

==== Flags ====
Beavers have a turquoise flag with white lettering and decals on a purple circular background in the centre for parades or when a member is being invested. It is a small, 600mm x 900mm flag so it can be carried by a Beaver.

==== Logo ====
In 2002, when Beavers were re-booted, its logo consisted of the uppercase red word 'Beavers' with a thick yellow outline laid on top of a circular motif that resembled a cross section of a tree, showing the bark and tree rings in different shades of brown. The typeface used for the logo and for headings in Beaver publications was House Industries' Funhouse with Frutiger used for body text in line with the association's branding. A smaller logo version, where just the letter 'B' was placed atop the log outline, was available as a variant.

In 2012, the brand style was changed so that text and pictures focused on fun, friendship and adventure of Beavers although the logo did not change and the colours used only changed in a minor way. This emphasis on adventure, and in particular how trying something new is an everyday adventure for a young Beaver, tied in to the association brand focusing on everyday adventure introduced in 2008. The look also introduced a mascot for the section replacing the generic beaver figure in use previously and creating instead a set of four anthropomorphised Beaver characters from different cultures and named after trees (Ash, Chery, Woody and Holly).

In 2015, branding styles were changed to focus on the fleur-de-lis. The new Beavers logo was simplified to a turquoise wordmark with either a small fleur-de-lis located to the top right of the wordmark or a larger version located directly above the wordmark. The logo was available in either turquoise alone or in a brighter version with a yellow outline and different coloured letters from the corporate colour palette. The wordmark retained the Funhouse typeface of the previous look; however, this was not used in any other publication; instead TheSerif was used for headings in line with the rest of the association and Frutiger continued to be used for body text. Beaver publications moved away from pictures and outlines and instead featured a character-led artwork style that the association intended as "joyous and imaginative". As part of this illustration style, the mascots were replaced with five represented by anthropomorphised animals: Bobbi (Beaver) their leader and four Beavers Harry (hippo), Erin (emu), Kyla (kangaroo) and Tareq (turtle).

In 2018, branding was changed with a new stylised fleur-de-lis and the fleur-de-lis mark was removed and the blue logo became darker and the multi-coloured logo colours were changed to reflect an updated corporate colour palette. The typeface for all documents was updated to use the Google Fonts typeface Nunito Sans.

== Events ==
There are some district and county activities for Beavers.

=== Fundays ===
Fundays is for Beavers, Cubs, Rainbows and Brownies run annually at Gilwell Park and, since 2015, at Woodhouse Park Scout Adventures in June by The Scout Association's Scout Adventures. Beavers are able to move around the event site trying a range of activities such as climbing, high ropes, creative endeavours, magic shows, circus acts and jousting.

=== Damboree ===
Damboree (a portmanteau of beaver dam and jamboree) began in 2018 to encourage Beaver leaders to apply for a permit to camp, following a 2015 rule change permitting Beavers to camp which was not sufficiently known. It was a Scout Active Support unit of Milton Keynes Scouts. It is not one event but there is a focus weekend each year, on which colonies are encouraged to camp.

== Enrolments ==
As of 2020, Beavers had the third highest enrolments of programmes run by The Scout Association, behind Cubs and Scouts respectively. From the mid-2000s until 2018, Beaver numbers steadily increased and from the same point to 2020, the number of Beaver colonies increased every year. There was a slight decrease in numbers between 2018 and 2020, which followed a similar demographic decline in the age group in the UK. The COVID-19 pandemic caused a significant decline between 2020 and 2021 as activities were suspended with the subsequent participation mirroring those of twelve years prior to the pandemic.

Enrolment in the Beaver programme
| Year | Members | Number of Beaver Colonies |
|---|---|---|
| 2008-09 | 103,226 | 6,862 |
| 2009-10 | 108,018 | 6,975 |
| 2010-11 | 112,058 | 7,122 |
| 2011-12 | 116,743 | 7,280 |
| 2012-13 | 118,182 | 7,356 |
| 2013-14 | 122,645 | 7,496 |
| 2014-15 | 123,559 | - |
| 2015-16 | 125,931 | - |
| 2016-17 | 128,224 | - |
| 2017-18 | 129,462 | 7,694 |
| 2018-19 | 128,179 | 7,721 |
| 2019-20 | 127,030 | 7,727 |
| 2020-21 | 82,662 | 7,785 |
| 2021-22 | 108,282 | 7,544 |
| 2022-23 | 112,750 | 7,393 |

== See also ==
- The Scout Association - the operator of the Beavers programme
- Cubs - the section that follows Beavers
- Age Groups in Scouting and Guiding
- Beavers (Scouting) - Beaver programmes in various organisations
- Joeys - equivalent age group programme in Australian
- Rainbows (Girl Guides) - equivalent age programme in Girlguiding
