= The Scout Association =

Scout organisation in the United Kingdom

- Logo since 2018
- Previous name: The Boy Scouts Association
- Age range: 4–6 Squirrels; 6–8 Beavers; 8–10½ Cubs; 10½–14 Scouts; 14–18 Explorer Scouts; 18–25 Network
- Headquarters: Gilwell Park
- Location: Chingford
- Country: United Kingdom
- Founded: 1910; 116 years ago; incorporated 1912; 114 years ago
- Founder: The Lord Baden-Powell
- Membership: 300 to 500; _________________; Enrolled participants: 445,916 aged 4 to 18; 86,875 adult direct leaders; 9,350 other uniformed adults
- Patron: The King
- Joint Presidents: The Princess of Wales; The Duke of Kent
- Chair: Craig Dewar-Willox
- Chief Scout: Dwayne Fields
- UK Chief Volunteer: Carl Hankinson
- Affiliation: World Organization of the Scout Movement
- Governing body: council (general meetings of members), board of trustees (directors), chief executive Aidan Jones
- Website scouts.org.uk

The Scout Association is a council that registers local Scout groups, which "are autonomous charities affiliated to The Scout Association". The organisation and its affiliated local groups have the largest enrolment within the Scout Movement in the United Kingdom. Following the rapid development of the Scout Movement from 1907, Robert Baden-Powell formed an advisory council in 1910, which was incorporated by a royal charter in 1912 under its previous name of The Boy Scouts Association. It is a founding member organisation of the World Organization of the Scout Movement.

As well as Scout programmes, divided into those aged 10½–14 and older "Explorer" Scouts (aged 14–18 year), it now also operates other programmes for those too old to be Scouts (adult Networks for ages 18–25) and those too young to be Scouts and make the Scout Promise (Cubs aged 8–10½, Beavers aged 6–8 and Squirrels aged 4–6).

As of 2025, the organisation claimed to provide activities to 445,916 enrolled 4 to 18 year olds in the UK. It had 86,875 adult volunteers in leader roles and 57,970 adults in governance, support and other roles, including Network members. That is one adult for every 3 children under 18 but 40% of the adults are not involved directly in leadership of children.

The organisation is the largest national Scout organisation in Europe, representing 35% of the participants of the European Scout Region. As of May 2026, there are over 7,000 charities operated by and affiliated to the organisation.

The organisation's current published aim is to provide "fun, adventure and skills for life and give young people the opportunity to enjoy new adventures, experience outdoors and take part in a range of creative, community and international activities, interact with others, make new friends, gain confidence and have the opportunity to reach their full potential".

== Admission practices ==
The organisation's programmes are open to all, regardless of abilities, faith or belief, gender, sexual orientation, race or social background.

Gender

From 1912 to 1967, the organisation was called The Boy Scouts Association and until 1976 only boys were admitted to its programmes. In 1910, Baden-Powell created an entirely separate organisation for girls, the Girl Guides. From December 1916, following the introduction of the organisation's Wolf Cubs programme for 8 to 10 year olds, in which Vera Barclay played a pivotal role, the organisation allowed women to take on limited volunteer roles, working with the younger boys. In 1976, the organisation allowed girls to join the organisation's Venture Scouts for 16 to 20 year-olds. In 1991, the admission of girls to all the organisation's programmes became optional. Since 2007, this has been compulsory. As of 2018, girls made up 71% of all new participants, with approximately 2.5 girls for every boy. Girls also made up 27% of all the organisation's participants, with a total of 99,989 female participants, aged between 6 and 25. 69,460 adult women were involved in volunteer roles (being more than 1 adult female for every 2 female young people).

Sexual orientation

While its founder, Baden-Powell, vilified homosexuality and "deviants", the organisation's programmes are now open to lesbian, gay, bisexual, transgender, queer and other (LGBTQA+) young people and adults.

Religion and beliefs

While originally requiring a promise of "Duty to God", the organisation's programmes and leader roles are now open to those of any faith or none, with variations to the Scout Promise to accommodate those of any religion or beliefs. Following criticisms of its original requirement for a commitment to God, in October 2013, the organisation announced that an alternative version of the promise would be available from January 2014 to admit those without a pronounced faith.

Disability

The organisation's programmes are open to all abilities: flexibility is built-in to the programme, with reasonable adjustments being made to badge and award requirements for anyone who needs them. Some area bodies also have a specialist commissioner or adviser to support inclusion. The disabled branch (later called Extension Scouting) was formed in 1926. However, in more recent years, emphasis has been placed on integrating young people with disabilities into mainstream Groups. After the Second World War, specialist Agoonoree camps were run to cater for those unable to camp with their own Scout Groups, with some still running today.

== History ==
=== Formation ===
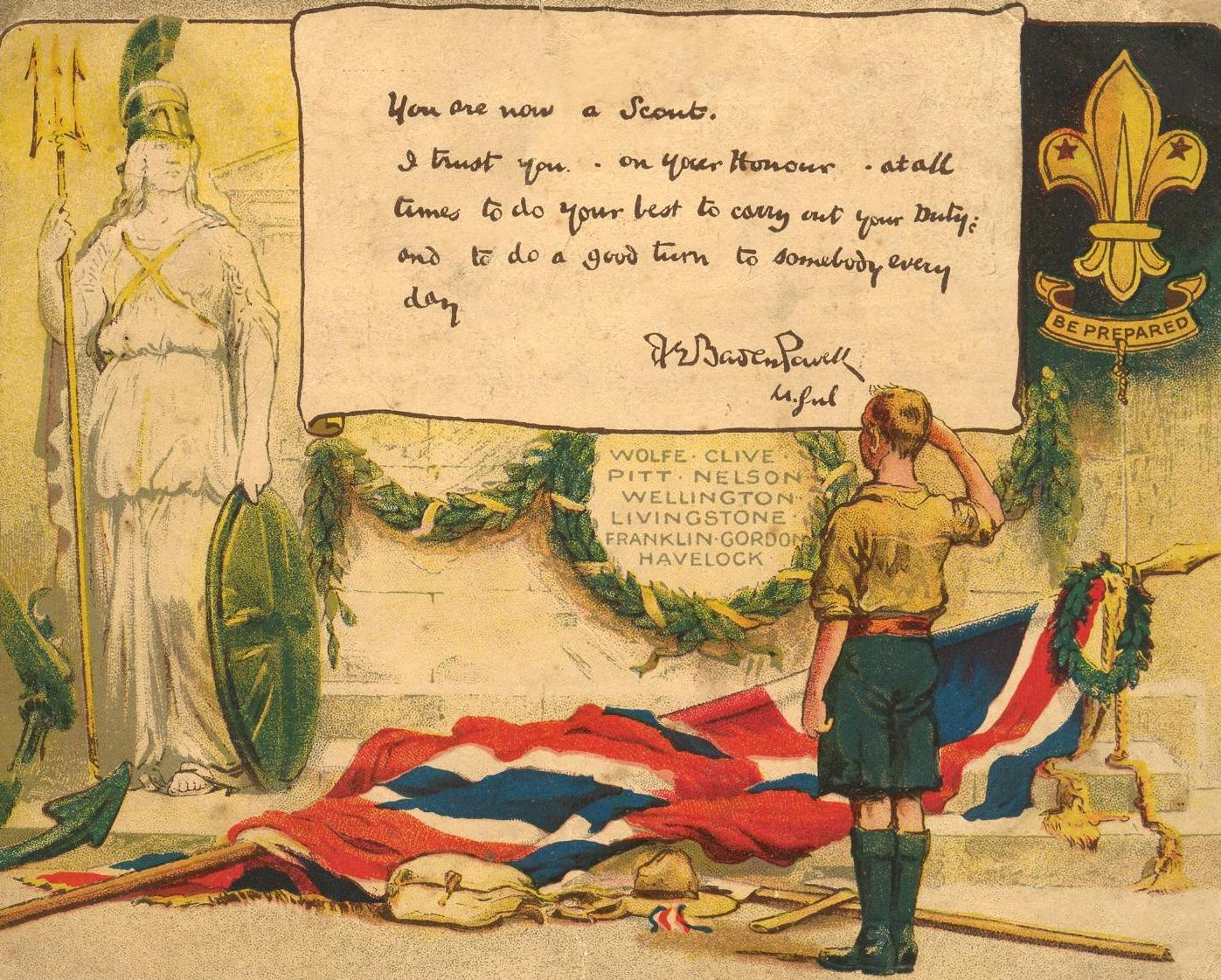
Scouts certificate dated 3 December 1914

For the origins of Boy Scouts and the Scout Movement, before the formation of The Scout Association, see Scout Movement.

The organisation was formed in 1910, in order to provide a national body in the United Kingdom which could organise and support the rapidly growing number of Scout patrols and troops, which had already formed spontaneously following the publication of Scouting for Boys and The Scout magazine in 1908. It was also the wish of Robert Baden-Powell to separate control of the Scout Movement from his book's publisher. It was felt it was not given the status it deserved, as the publisher Arthur Pearson controlled much of Scouts.

=== 1910–1920: growth ===
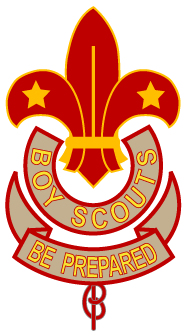
Enrolment "Tenderfoot" badge of The Boy Scout Association, used prior to 1967

The organisation grew and spread to much of the British Empire. In 1910, the organisation approved special uniforms for Sea Scouts and formally adopted use of the name in 1912. On 4 January 1912, the organisation was incorporated throughout the British Empire by Royal charter for "the purpose of instructing boys of all classes in the principles of discipline loyalty and good citizenship".

The organisation's programme was originally just for boys aged between 11 and 18. However, many girls and younger boys wanted to join in. In 1910, a separate organisation, the Girl Guides were created by Baden-Powell and his sister, Agnes, to provide a more "proper" programme of activities. In 1916, the organisation launched its Wolf Cubs, for boys aged 8 to 11. In 1918, the organisation launched its Rovers for those over 18 who had grown out of being Scouts but wanted to be remain connected.

During the First World War, more than 50,000 Scouts participated in some form of war work on the home front. Scout buglers sounded the "all clear" after air raids or air strike, others helped in hospitals and made up aid parcels; Sea Scouts assisted the Coastguard in watching the vulnerable East coast.

In 1920, the organisation organised the first World Jamboree, held in Olympia, London, together with an international conference for leaders which led to the formation, in 1922, of the International Conference of the Boy Scout Movement now called the World Organization of the Scout Movement, of which the organisation was a founding member.

The Headquarters Gazette was first published in July 1909, as a publication for adult Scouters and administrators, alongside The Scout, a magazine for youths which had been launched in April 1908.

=== 1920–1967 ===
In 1929, the organisation hosted the 3rd World Scout Jamboree at Arrowe Park in Cheshire; some 56,000 Scouts from 35 countries attended, making it the largest World Scout Jamboree to date. The first Gang Show, produced by Ralph Reader, opened at the Scala Theatre in London in October 1932. Following the outbreak of World War II, over 50,000 Scouts trained under the National War Service scheme. Tasks undertaken included police messengers and stretcher bearers. In January 1941, the organisation launched its Air Scout branch, allowing Scout Troops to specialise in activities related to aircraft and flying.

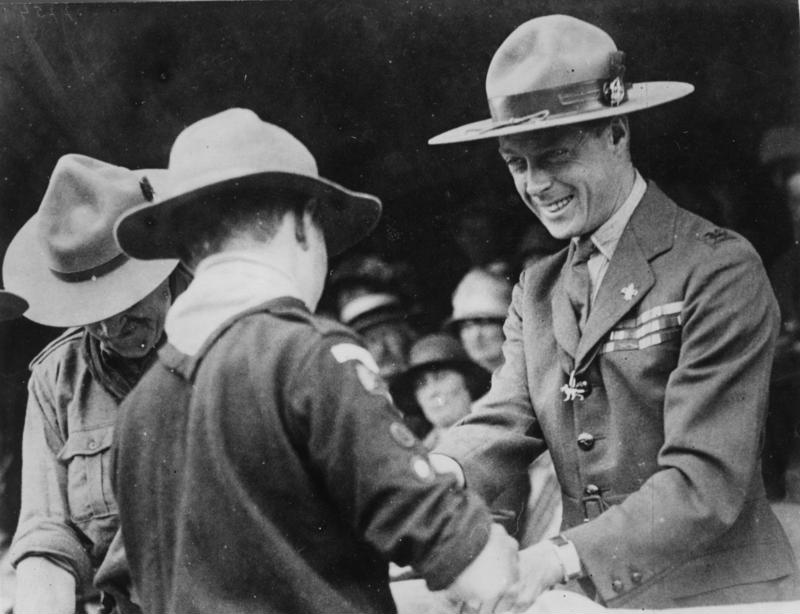
The Prince of Wales (the future King Edward VIII) in Scouting uniform at 3rd World Scout Jamboree, 1929

The organisation continued to be headed by Baden-Powell, as its Chief Scout and chairman for life until he retired in 1937 and moved to Kenya in 1938, where he died on 8 January 1941. The organisation then appointed Lord Somers as its Chief Scout.

Starting in 1944, the Scout International Relief Service (SIRS) sent teams of Rovers and Scouters to continental Europe to provide humanitarian aid; ten SIRS teams worked at the recently relieved Bergen-Belsen concentration camp. After years of trial schemes, in 1946, the organisation launched its Senior Scout programme for Boy Scouts aged fifteen to eighteen years to form separate patrols or troops, with age appropriate activities and badges. Scouts were prominent in their support of the 1948 Summer Olympics, playing leading roles in the opening and closing ceremonies at Wembley Stadium and the sailing events at Torbay. The first Bob a Job Week took place in April 1949, in which Scouts did small tasks for the public in return for a "bob" - colloquial name for the shilling coin (5 new pence) - to raise funds for the organisation and for Arthur Pearson's fund for the blind. Over the organisation's history, some boys had been challenged to justify their enrolment because of their own or even their parents' religious or political beliefs. In the early 1950s, some Boy Scouts were dismissed or marginalized in their Scout Groups due to their involvement with the Young Communist League or related communist activities – the most high-profile case being that of Paul Garland from Bristol in 1954 which resulted in media reports and a debate in the House of Lords, where the organisation's Chief Scout, Lord Rowallan defended the organisation's political and religious discrimination based on claims about foreign communist regimes' antipathy to Scout organisations and it took 60 more years for the organisation to change its discriminatory policy and accept atheists.

In 1957, to commemorate fifty years of the Scout Movement and the centenary of Baden-Powell's birth, the organisation hosted the 9th World Scout Jamboree, which took place at Sutton Park near Birmingham.

=== 1967–2001 ===
Enrolment badge of the organisation between 1967 and 2003. This logo is still used on some items for example on the centre of flags.

The organisation's programmes went largely unchanged until it underwent a major review in the 1960s. The Chief Scouts' Advance Party was formed in 1964 and was sent to survey the organisation to see why participation was falling. Their report was published in 1966 and changes were implemented later that year and throughout 1967. As a result, the word "boy" was dropped from the organisation's name which was changed to The Scout Association and major changes were made to the age sections and their respective programmes. The youngest section were now named Cubs, the Boy Scout section was renamed simply as the Scout section and the Senior Scouts and Rovers sections were replaced with Venture Scouts for 16- to 20-year-olds. The uniform were also changed with the inclusion of optional long trousers, as opposed to the compulsory wearing of shorts and the wearing of a Beret instead of the Campaign hat.

The Advance Party Report was not welcomed by all involved and a rival report, A Boy Scout Black Paper, was produced in 1970 by the Scout Action Group. This provided alternative proposals for the development of the organisation and asked for groups that wished to continue to follow Baden-Powell's original scheme to be permitted to do so. The rejection of these proposals resulted in the formation of the traditionalist Baden-Powell Scouts' Association.

Several developments were made over the following years, including the admission of girls, initially restricted to the Venture Scouts section in 1976, but from 1991 junior sections were allowed to become mixed as well, starting in Bradford, West Yorkshire and working its way throughout the UK. Parents of children involved with the organisation in Northern Ireland also began to organise activities for children who were too young for Cubs. Initially, only the leaders of these activities, nicknamed Beavers, were registered and organisation officials, with the children participating not being enrolled by the organisation until it formally adopted the programme in 1986. In the late 1990s, a Muslim Scout Fellowship was formed, which by the end of 2007, had assisted the establishment of 13 Muslim Scout Groups in England and Wales.

Despite these and other changes, the organisation's enrolments fell into a decline through the 1990s. This spurred a major review into the causes of the decline in 1999.

=== 2001–2014 ===
Logo of the organisation between 2001 and 2018. This logo is still seen on external signage on older huts/halls.

The organisation found itself competing for young people's time against many other extracurricular activities and schools themselves which were increasingly venturing into the same types of activities. In addition, adult leaders became concerned with the growing litigation culture in the UK and the negative stereotype as being old fashioned.

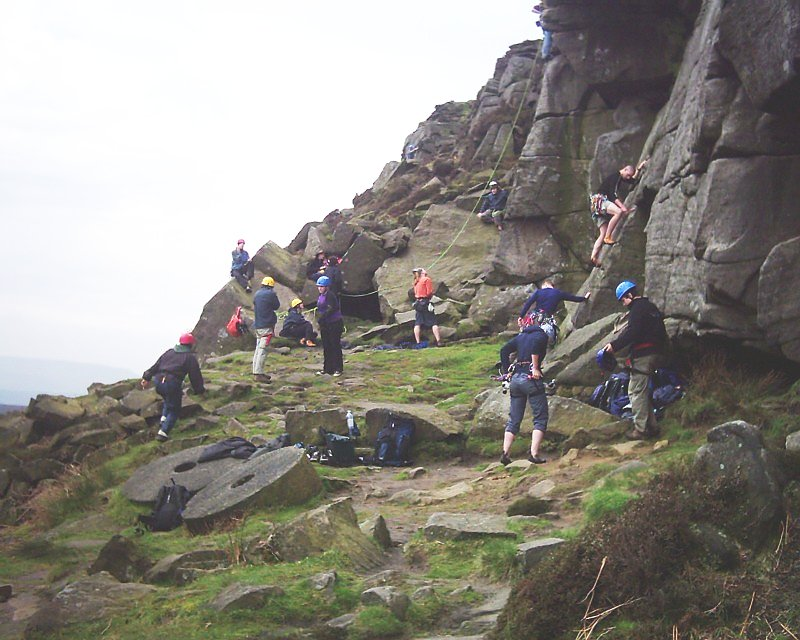
Explorer Scouts of the newly created section climbing at Stanage Edge

To keep up with trends and appeal to audience new generation, a new uniform, designed by Meg Andrew, was launched in 2001. The uniform included a variety of bold colours, with the younger sections wearing sweatshirts and activity trousers.

In 2002 the organisation launched its new vision towards 2012, which heralded another period of change. The Venture Scouts programme was discontinued and two new sections were introduced: Scout Network for 18- to 25-year-olds, as well as Explorer Scouts for 14- to 18-year-olds. A new programme was introduced, complete with a new range of badges and awards covering a wider variety of topics such as Public Relations and Information Technology, developing practical and employability skills. The new badges drew mixed reactions from several public figures, with some praising the organisation for "moving with the times" and others feeling the changes went "against the Scouting ethos of Baden-Powell".

Further changes took place in 2003 when the organisation's Adult Training Scheme was relaunched to be more focused and targeted to the volunteer's individual role, as opposed to the more general training received before.

The organisation also began to change in its focus, with a renewed emphasis on outdoor adventure and it now offers over 200 fun and adventurous activities from abseiling and archery while also offering a wider range of development opportunities, from coding to music and drama. In 2004 the organisation appointed television presenter Peter Duncan as its Chief Scout, who was succeeded by adventurer Bear Grylls in July 2009. The organisation appointed its first UK Chief Commissioner, Wayne Bulpitt, on the same day, with a particular remit to support volunteers, grow and develop the organisation.

The organisation hosted several major events during this time including EuroJam in 2005, hosting 10,000 Scouts and Guides from 40 countries, the 21st World Scout Jamboree in 2007 as well as playing a major role in the centenary celebrations of Scouting that same year, with celebration events organised on Brownsea Island.

By 2010, census figures showed a strong upturn, with the organisation claiming its highest rate of growth in UK since 1972, with total claimed participation reaching just under half a million. In 2014, the organisation claimed an increase in membership of 100,000 in the ten years since 2004. In 2016 it claimed eleven years of consecutive growth and an increase in female enrolment, with 25% of participants now female in the 25 years since girls were first welcomed in 1976.

The organisation claims one of its biggest challenges is encouraging more adults to volunteer to reduce the number of young people on waiting lists (cited at around 40,000). However, by its reported figures (above) it has a high ratio of more than 1 adult volunteer to 4 participant young people (see above), as "young people" includes adults aged 18 to 25. The effort to attract new volunteers received a boost when the Duchess of Cambridge announced her intention to become a volunteer leader for the organisation with a Scout Group near her Anglesey home. In the decade up to 2014, the number of adult volunteers increased by 14,596 to a total of over 104,000.

=== 2014–present ===
A strategic plan for 2014 to 2018, proposed four key areas: growth, inclusivity, increasing youth involvement in planning and in projects to improve their local area and introduced the role of national youth commissioner who works with the organisation's national leadership team, chief executive, Chief Scout, chief commissioner and board chair to contribute to discussions on behalf of youths and ensure key changes are subject to youth consultation. Counties and district units were encouraged to appoint their own youth commissioners for young people to have an opportunity to influence their activities.

In October 2015, the organisation launched a three-year community impact project called "A Million Hands" to mobilise half a million Scouts to support four social issues chosen by their young people. Its aim was to build real and lasting relationships in communities to enable young people to continue taking "social action" long into the future. The project worked in partnership with six key charities: Mind, Alzheimer's Society, Leonard Cheshire Disability, Guide Dogs, Water Aid and the Canal & River Trust to support the four key issues of dementia, disability, mental wellbeing and resilience, and clean water and sanitation.

Also in 2015, Dr Ann Limb was appointed chair of the organisation, the first woman to hold the post.

Throughout 2016, the organisation celebrated the centenary of Cubs, named Cubs100, 100 years after the wolf cub programme was launched. Adventurer Steve Backshall was appointed Cubs100 Ambassador to raise the profile of the anniversary year. A range of events took place throughout 2016, with "promise parties" on 16 December, at which Cubs renewed their promises, including one in Kings Lynn attended by the Duchess of Cambridge.

In May 2018, the organisation announced a new 'Skills For Life' strategy as its focus to 2023. Its objectives are similar (with the same outcomes of growth, inclusivity, youth shaped Scouting and community impact), however there is now more of a framework to develop and achieve the objectives. Alongside the new strategy launch, the organisation launched new branding to support the strategy and change the then 17-year-old logo. The major changes included a new typeface for documents and literature from the organisation, new colours with an updated corporate logo. This was introduced to the organisation on a two-year transition period.

As a consequence of the COVID-19 pandemic, in March 2020, the organisation's face-to-face activities were suspended and weekly meetings had to be delivered through Zoom. To support this, the organisation launched an online package of activities called "the Great Indoors" and a national fund raising campaign called "Hike to the Moon" in aid of those affected by the crisis, as well as online briefings for adult leaders. Despite these initiatives, in May 2021 it was announced that enrolment numbers had fallen by over 100,000 (from 480,083 to 362,752), with the number of adult leaders falling from 156,000 in 2020 to just under 141,000, reported to be the largest drop in numbers since 1941. The organisation's financial situation declined during the pandemic and in the aftermath, necessitating the selling of an activity centre and hostel and 150 staff being made redundant. Additionally, a recruitment campaign for 10,000 volunteer leaders was launched to replace volunteers who departed and build capacity for the high demand from young people. Despite the organisation's efforts, membership in the early years of the 2020s did not rise as quickly as they had expected, requiring further staff redundancies in April 2024 to cover missing membership fees.

Announced as part of the Skills For Life strategic plan in May 2018, from 2019 the organisation trialled an early years programme section. The name initially chosen for the pilots, involving children aged 4–6 years, was Hedgehogs and involved a programme funded by the Department for Education and delivered either as an organisation-led programme, a parent-led programme or a partner-led early years programme. The aim of the pilot was to explore early years provision with children of this age and determine whether this is a route the organisation should take. The organisation decided to proceed with the pilot and the phased roll out of the section over a period of years until it was in a position to introduce the section formally, now under the name Squirrels, in September 2021. The name was chosen after field testing in communities underrepresented in the organisation's programmes and because of the support of the Northern Ireland Squirrel Association that subsequently merged into the organisation after 25 years of independent operation alongside the organisation in Northern Ireland. The name is also recognised by many due to its links to the popular children's programme Hey Duggee. Squirrels wear a red sweatshirt uniform and meet in Dreys organised within Scout groups. The initial 200 dreys were targeted to areas previously under-served by the organisation including diverse areas and those comprising a high number of low income households.

Between January 2021 and January 2022, following the introduction of programmes for younger infant children, the organisation experienced its most significant growth in participants since World War II with a 16% increase, from 362,668 to 421,852. This rebound followed a 24.5% decline during the COVID-19 pandemic. The resurgence was driven by heightened demand for outdoor activities and community engagement following COVID lockdowns. However this also led to a record-high waiting list, exceeding 100,000 young people as of July 2024.

== Organisational structure ==
The organisation consists of between just 300 and 500 members, called the "council" in its incorporating charter. The majority of the council are elected by the council itself with the council or its board also appointing all its officers and all commissioner members. Even those nominated by Scout Counties to the council require previous appointment to their positions or approval by the council's board or officers appointed by the board.

The council elects the organisation's directors (termed "board of trustees" and formerly "committee of the council"), who manage the organisation, determines its "Policy, Organisation and Rules" (POR), nominates members of the council and makes all appointments within the organisation.

=== Patron, officers and paid staff ===
The organisation's patron is the King. Its joint presidents are the Duke of Kent and the Princess of Wales.

The council elects the organisation's chief scout, currently, since September 2024, Dwayne Fields, who is the nominal, titular head of the organisation and its promotional face.

The organisation's UK chief volunteer (formerly titled chief commissioner), currently Carl Hankinson, acts as its deputy chief scout and appoints a team of commissioners who are responsible for programmes in their respective fields. In 2014, the organisation created the roles of youth commissioner (now youth lead) and deputy youth commissioner to work with the national leadership team to advocate on behalf of youth participants.

The board employ paid staff to implement their directions and policies. The chief executive, currently Aidan Jones (from October 2024), manages the work of the headquarters staff. The association set up a head office audit and assurance staff team in October 2023, whose role will be to monitor local groups' training, compliance and risk management processes.

=== Geographic divisions ===
The organisation is divided into national groupings for England, Scotland, Wales and Northern Ireland. The organisation in England is managed directly by the UK Headquarters, while the organisation has a council and administration in each of the other nations. Each of national divisions is further broken up into local counties for England and Northern Ireland, areas for Wales, regions for Scotland and a balliwick in the case of Guernsey, which in many cases follow the boundaries of ceremonial counties. The county, area or region is usually broken down further into a number of Scout Districts, which cover a town, some or all of a city, such as "Bradford South", or a section of a larger region such as the New Forest. Each county and district is a separate charity registered with the organisation.

=== Scout Groups ===
Scout Groups are local scout organisations and separate charities registered with the organisation. Some Groups are direct descendants of the original Scout Patrols and Scout Troops. Groups can consist of one or more Squirrel Dreys, Beaver Colonies, Cub Packs and Scout Troops and may also have one or more Scout Active Support Units, or an Explorer Scout Unit attached to it. Scout Groups only manage the first four sections, with Explorer Scouts and Scout Networks managed by the Scout District.

=== Leadership roles ===
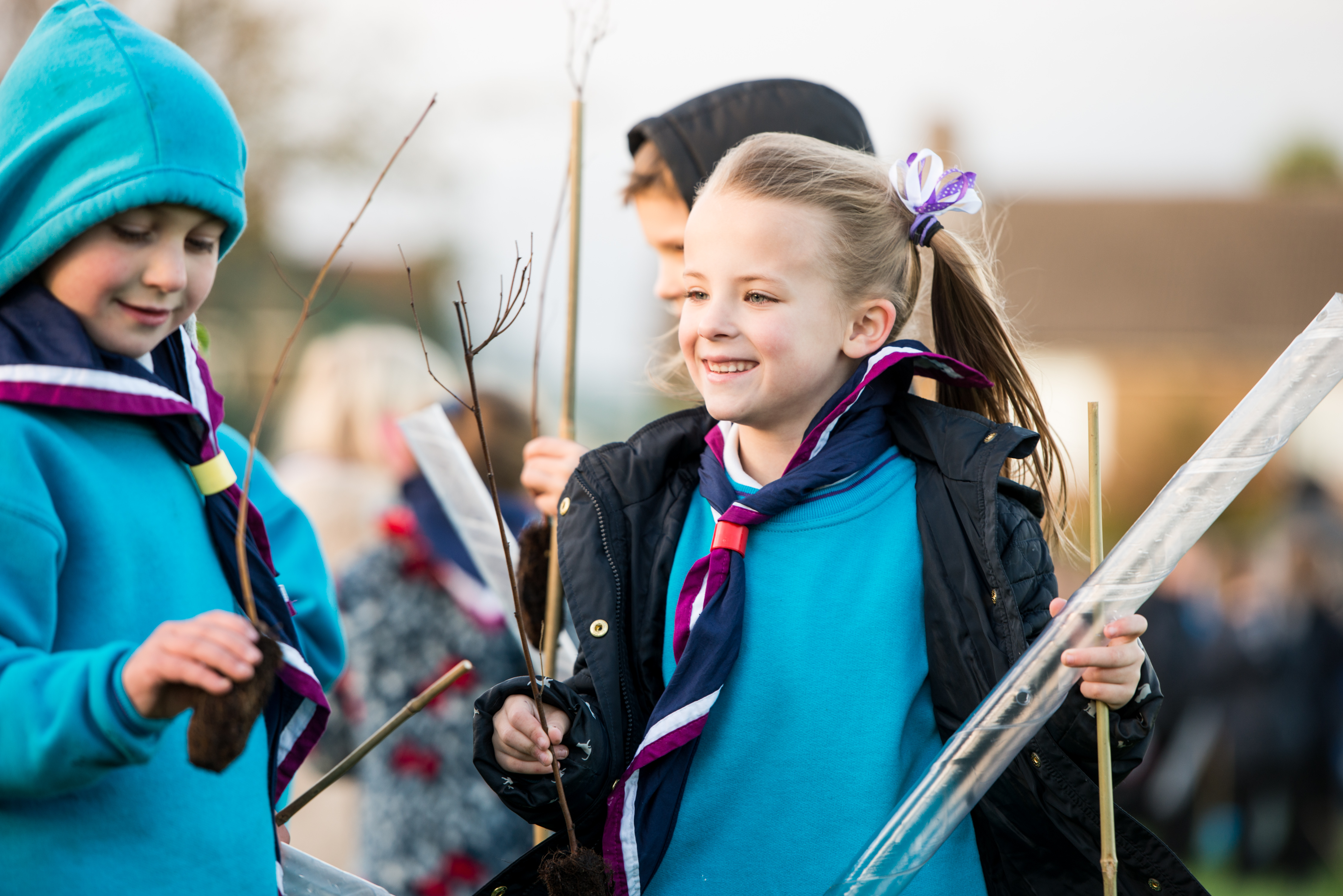
Beavers in a Better Prepared project in 2016

The organisation, its national, county, regional and area bodies and each District and Scout Group registered with it are managed by committees (termed "trustee boards" to separate governance from operational roles).

There are around 120,000 adult volunteers. The organisation employs 198 full-time and part-time paid staff.

Each of the organisation's national, county, area and region bodies and each Scout district and Scout Group registered with the organisation are led by an adult volunteer termed a "lead volunteer", who is responsible for ensuring the organisation's standards are met. Lead volunteers can be assisted by deputies and assistants in particular responsibilities. A Group lead volunteer and their team lead a local Scout group. These adult volunteer leader roles are uniformed and, to attain a Wood Badge, are trained in the organisation's values, safety and child protection (safeguarding), inclusion and managerial skills. Many counties and districts also have a Youth Lead Volunteer, aged under 25 on appointment, who helps to ensure that young peoples' perspectives are included in the design and management of scouting.

In England, paid staff are employed by regional services teams. In Wales, Scotland and Northern Ireland, field volunteers support lead volunteers. District lead volunteers report to the county, area or regional lead volunteer, who reports to the UK lead volunteer.

Each Scout troop and Explorer Scout unit and each other programme section is run by one or more uniformed adult volunteer leaders, and can have assistant leaders. These roles require training as above and in camping, Scout skills and administration and, every three years, in first aid, safety and child protection. Supporting these leaders there can be uniformed section team members and the non-uniformed occasional helpers. Team members have to complete only basic training, in the organisation's values, safety and child protection, while occasional helpers are required only to have a criminal records check by the Disclosure and Barring Service. In addition, there are non-adult young leaders, who must complete training in child protection and safety and have the option to complete further modules on topics that mirror the adult training programme.

Until 2024, adults could join Scout Active Support units and support the organisation's activities without the commitment of a leader role.

=== Sections by age ===
The organisation operates six programmes for different age ranges, between 4 and 25 years of age:

Section	Ages	Controlled by	Activities	Introduced	2021 Enrolments	2023 Enrolments
Squirrels	4–6	Group	Play, learn and get outdoors.	2021	–	10,586
Beavers	6–8	Group	Try new things, make new friends.	1986	82,662	112,750
Cubs	8–10 1/2	Group	Master new skills, have adventures.	1916	122,169	142,273
Scouts	10 1/2–14	Group	Explore the world, challenge yourself.	1910	111,804	126,133
Explorer Scouts	14–18	District	Take the lead, embrace change.	2002	36,582	44,273
Scout Network	18–25	District	Be the best you can be.	2002	9,535	8,143

The core five sections (Squirrels to Explorers) are each led by a section leader and aided by assistant leaders, sectional assistants, parent helpers and young leaders, who are Explorer Scouts trained in leadership techniques.

Scout Networks are mainly participant-led but are assisted by a 14–24 Lead who ensures that the Network is working within the movement's Policy, Organisation and Rules.

In addition to adult volunteers running sessions, the organisation encourages its participants themselves to take on positions of responsibility for their section meetings. This can be through responsibility for a group, such as the Patrol Leader and Assistant Patrol Leader in Scouts and Sixers and Seconders in Cubs, or through sectional forums to feedback on programmes. The Scout section also have the role of Senior Patrol Leader, usually someone about to move on to Explorers who overlooks all the patrols and Explorers are openly encouraged to run evenings and to plan their own meetings.

=== Air and Sea Scouts ===
Some Scout Groups offer special Air Scouts and Sea Scouts programmes. Both programmes follow the same core programme in all sections but can add more aeronautical or nautical emphasis, with some Scout Troops or Explorer Scout Units choosing to seek to be recognised by the Royal Air Force or Royal Navy. In the United Kingdom there are approximately 400 Sea Scout Groups, of which about 25% (101 Groups) are Royal Navy recognised, whilst of 117 Air Scout Groups, 43 are recognised by the RAF. The number of Troops or Units that can be recognised in either scheme is strictly limited and recognition is only awarded to those which meet the requirements and pass an inspection by a service officer. Recognised Troops or Units are inspected biennially and only retain their recognised status if they have continued to meet the required standards.

=== Safety and safeguarding ===
Safeguarding guidance is issued in the form of a 'yellow card', which all adults in the organisation must follow. The yellow card was revised in January 2024 with a requirement that any safeguarding concern must now be reported directly to the organisation's head office. Other coloured cards cover safety (the purple card), young leaders (the orange card) and the use of alcohol (the green card). The organisation does not permit certain activities at its events: banana boating, bungee jumping, hitch hiking, knife throwing, archery tag and trotti biking.

== Programme, badges and awards ==
=== Programme history ===
The youth programme has been developed and expanded from Baden-Powell's original Scout training scheme, which aimed to encourage personal achievement and provide a framework for the activities of the Scout Troop. In the Boy Scout section, this consisted of the award of badges for Tenderfoot, Second and First Class Scout and finally King's Scout, which were earned by passing tests in a wide variety of skills associated with the outdoors, health and good citizenship. With the creation of the Wolf Cub section in 1916, a similar system was devised, the awards being Tenderpad, First Star and Second Star and an award called the Leaping Wolf was added later which required Cubs to move up to the Scout Troop. In parallel with this scheme, Cubs and Scouts were able to earn Proficiency Badges for specific skills and hobbies, an idea that Baden-Powell probably copied from Ernest Thompson Seton. The test requirements for Baden-Powell's scheme were revised in 1944 and again in 1958 without altering the basic structure.

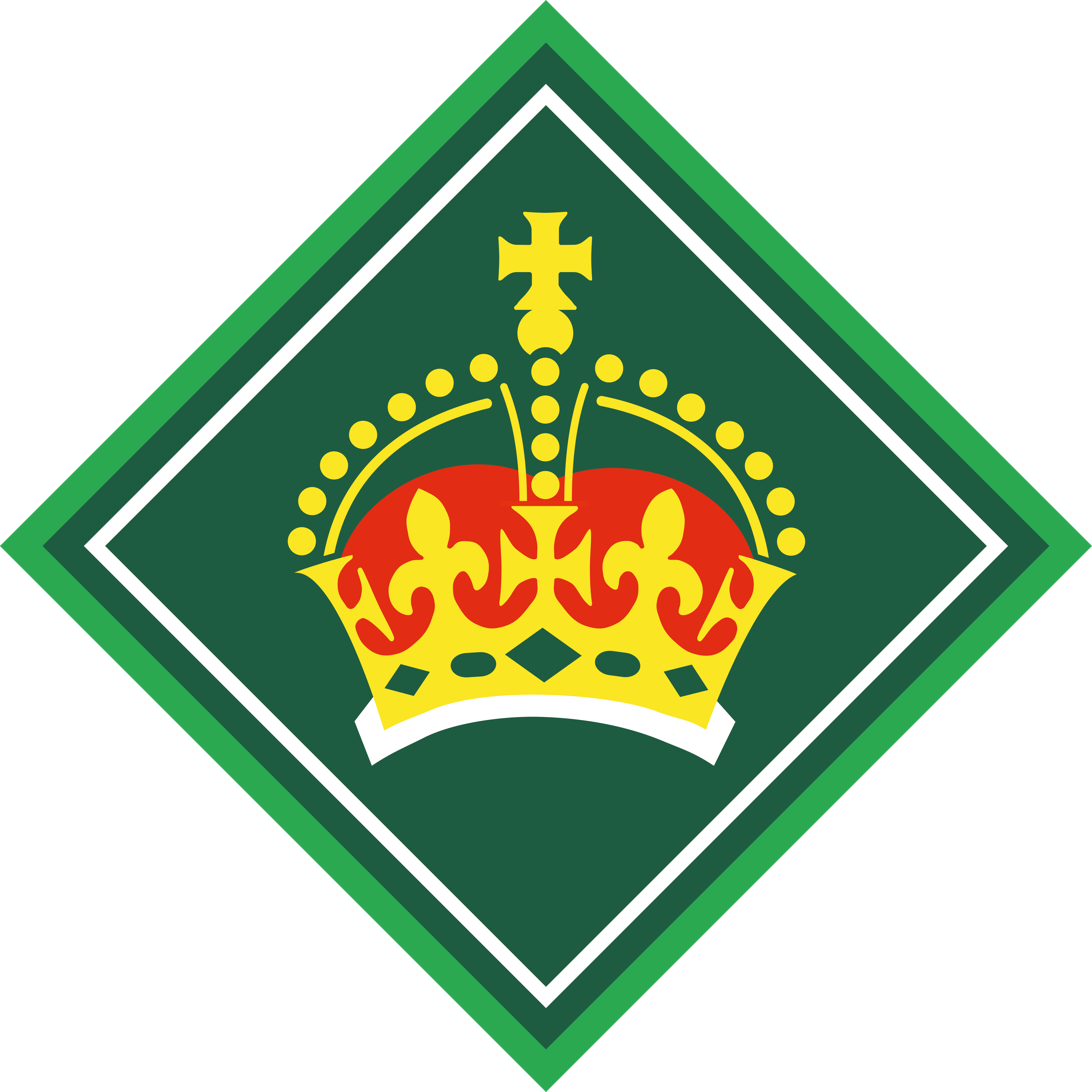
King's Scout award badge

The 1966 Advance Party Report recommended a wholly new Progressive Training Scheme; for Cubs the Bronze, Silver and Gold Arrows, for Scouts the Scout Standard, Advanced Scout Standard and Chief Scout's Award and for the new Venture Scout Section, the Venture Award and the Queen's Scout Award which focused on long-term service and commitment as well as the completion of an expedition lasting four days and fifty miles. These changes were implemented in October 1967. From then on, the programme has been subject to regular revision; the Scout standards were replaced in 1984 by the Scout Award, Pathfinder Award and Explorer Award with a fully revised Chief Scout's Award. The Cub arrows were replaced in 1991 with the Cub Award, Adventure Award and Adventure Crest Award. All these awards were replaced following the introduction of the Programme Review in February 2002. A new concept called the Balanced Programme replaced the previous scheme. Challenge Awards could be earned by participating in activities in various Programme Zones such as outdoors, fitness, community or international. Earning a certain number of Challenge Awards and the completion of a personal challenge led to the Bronze Chief Scout's Award for Beavers, Silver for Cubs and Gold for Scouts. Proficiency Badges were revised and renamed Activity Badges. In 2015, the programme was revised again following consultation within the organisation, the changes being called the Programme Refresh.

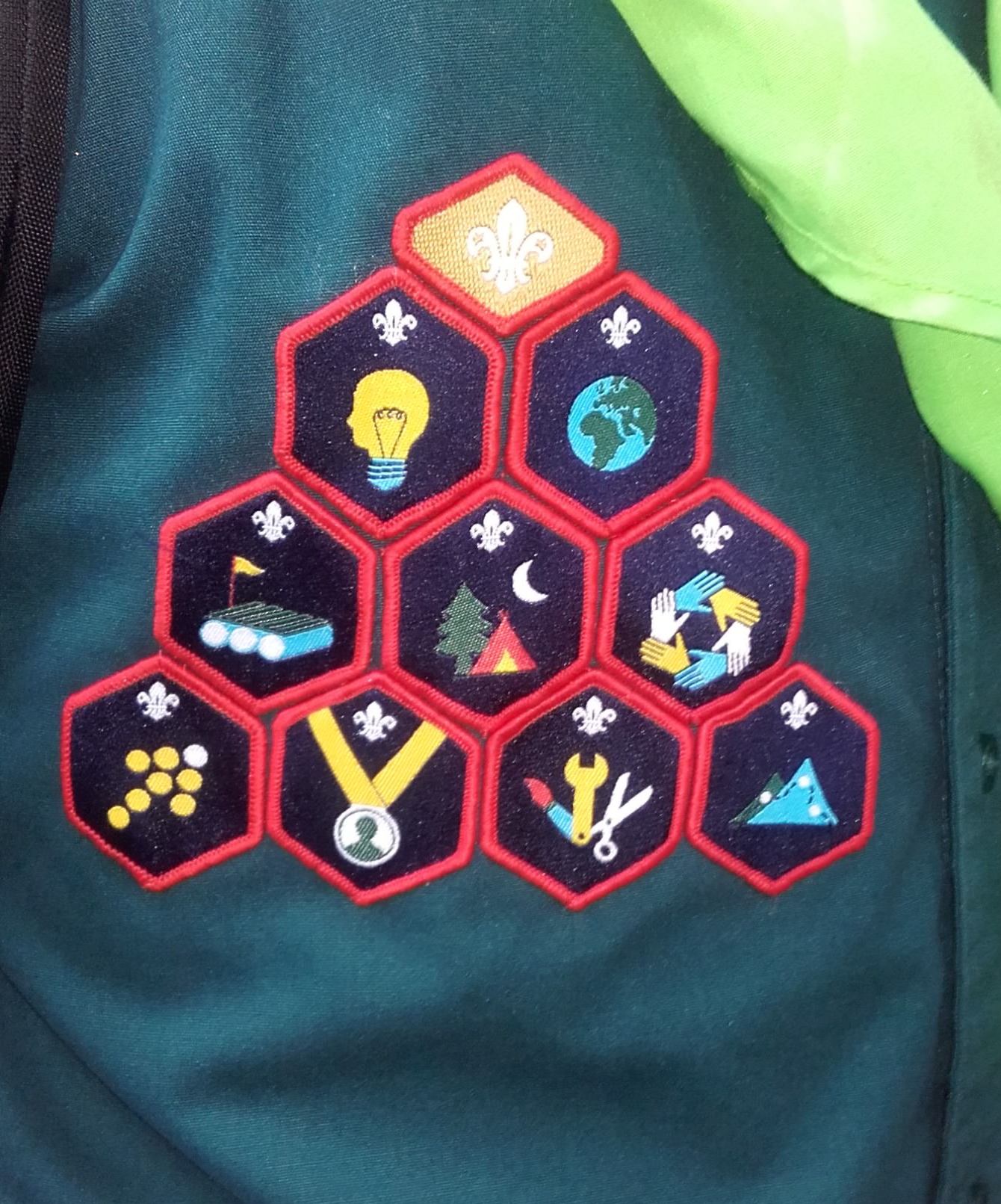
The nine Challenge Badges and the Chief Scout's Gold Award for the Scout Section, from the training programme revised in 2015.

=== Award scheme ===
There are Chief Scout's Awards available in each section together with the King's Scout Award:

Top Awards
Award	Section	Requirements
Chief Scout's Acorn	Squirrels	4 Squirrel challenge awards and 2 activity or staged badges
Chief Scout's Bronze	Beavers	6 Beaver challenge awards and 4 activity or staged badges
Chief Scout's Silver	Cubs	7 Cub challenge awards and 6 activity or staged badges
Chief Scout's Gold	Scouts	9 Scout challenge awards and 6 activity or staged badges
Chief Scout's Platinum	Explorers	Be a member of Explorers for 6 months, complete 8 nights away (at least 4 camping), two international/community/values activities plus one of the Duke of Edinburgh's Bronze Award, Mencap's Bronze Gateway Award or the 4 Platinum Challenges
Chief Scout's Diamond	Explorers or Network	Be a member of Explorers, Network or both for 12 months, complete 16 nights away (at least 8 camping), four international/community/values activities (which may include 2 completed for the Platinum Award) plus one of the Duke of Edinburgh's Silver Award, Mencap's Silver Gateway Award or the 4 Diamond Challenges
King's Scout	Explorers or Network	Be a member of Explorers, Network or both for 18 months, complete 24 nights away (at least 12 camping), six international/community/values activities (which may include 4 completed for the Diamond and Platinum Awards) plus one of the Duke of Edinburgh's Gold Award, Mencap's Gold Gateway Award or the 5 Diamond Challenges, and give a presentation to a suitable audience on all elements of the KSA

The final three awards, The Chief Scout's Platinum and Diamond Awards and The King's Scout Award are available in the build on the requirements of The Duke of Edinburgh's Award at Bronze, Silver and Gold level respectively, consisting of a period of time volunteering in the local community, a prolonged physical activity, the advancement of a skill and the undertaking an expedition, allowing a participant to achieve both the DofE and the Scout award at the same time. Mencap's Bronze, Silver and Gold Gateway Awards are available as an alternative to the DofE awards for those with learning disabilities. In addition, these three awards do not have to be completed in order and participants can skip straight to a specific award, although additional work is involved. Achieving The King's Scout Award is seen as a significant event on a national scale; recipients of the award are invited to join the St George's Day service at Windsor Castle the year after completing the scheme and parade before The King or his representative, usually a member of the Royal Family.

=== Awards for gallantry, meritorious conduct and good service ===
The Cornwell Scout Badge may be awarded to youths who display "pre-eminently high character and devotion to duty, together with great courage and endurance". Anyone registered with the organisation may be awarded the Gilt Cross or the Silver Cross for gallantry, or the Bronze Cross for "special heroism or action in the face of extraordinary risk". The Chief Scout's Commendation for Meritorious Conduct and the Medal of Meritorious Conduct may also be awarded to any registered participant. Adult leaders and supporters are awarded the Chief Scout's Length of Service Award which marks the number of years of service in any role. More distinguished good service by an adult may be marked by the award of a Commendation Award (formerly known as a Commissioner's Commendation Award), the Chief Scout's Commendation for Good Service, the Award for Merit, the Silver Acorn or ultimately, the Silver Wolf, which is the unrestricted gift of the Chief Scout and is awarded for service of "a most exceptional nature".

== Promise and law ==
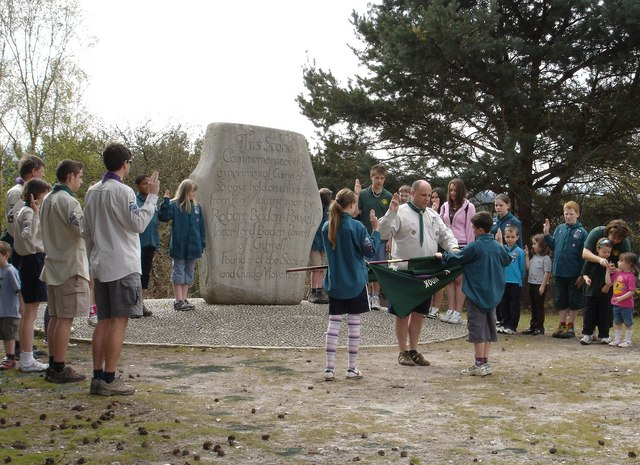
Making the Scout Promise at an Investiture Ceremony on Brownsea Island

Variation of a Scout Promise are made by all participants of the organisation from the Scout section upwards, including leaders with variations for different faiths or for participants from other countries, whose allegiance is pledged to the country and not the monarch.

== Uniform ==
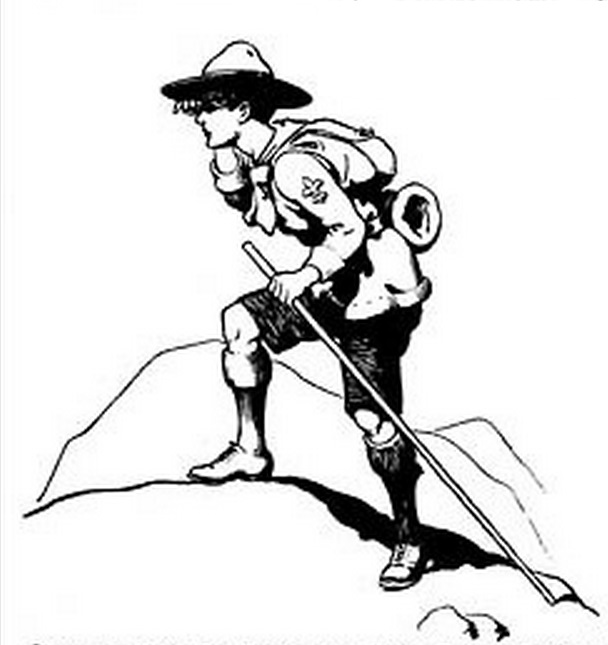
One of Baden-Powell's drawings for Scouting for Boys published in 1908, showing his original concept for the Scout uniform

Uniforms are intended to be comfortable and practicable for those who wear them. Whilst members who are eligible are encouraged to wear the relevant uniform for their section or role, it is not actually mandatory that they do so: they "may" wear the uniform.

=== History of uniform ===
In Scouting for Boys, Baden-Powell recommended a distinctive and practical uniform that was "very like the uniform worn by my men when I commanded the South African Constabulary". This in turn, seems to have been derived from the dress adopted by Baden-Powell in the Second Matabele War of 1896, influenced by his friend and colleague, Frederick Russell Burnham. The original Boy Scout uniform consisted of a khaki shirt and shorts, a neckerchief or "scarf", campaign hat and a Scout staff. At the formation of the Wolf Cub section in 1916, Baden-Powell wanted to make the younger boys totally distinct from the older Boy Scouts; the result was a green woollen jersey, shorts, neckerchief and a green cricket cap with gold piping. In 1946, the new Senior Scout section were allowed to wear a maroon beret instead of the hat; a green beret became an option for the Boy Scout section in 1954.

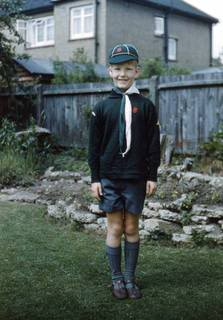
Wolf Cub uniform in 1960

In 1966, the Advance Party Report recommended a total redesign and modernisation of the uniform, commenting that there had been much criticism of "the Boer War appearance of our uniforms" and that the "wearing of shorts by members of the Movement is one of the most damaging aspects of our present public image". Although the Cub uniform barely changed, retaining short trousers, the Scout section were to wear a long sleeved dark green shirt and long trousers in a brownish colour described as "mushroom". Venture Scouts and male Scouters had identical khaki shirts and mushroom trousers, but the neckerchief was replaced by a tie, brown for Venture Scouts and green for Scouters. Female Scouters had a dark green dress and a cap similar to those worn by airline flight attendants at the time. These recommendations were accepted and implemented from October 1967.

Later amendments included khaki shirts for female Venture Scouts and Scouters, the abolition of all uniform headgear except Sea Scout caps and Air Scout berets and black long trousers for Cubs as an option to shorts. A grey sweatshirt was introduced for the new Beavers section in 1986 and a dark green sweatshirt replaced the Cubs' knitted jersey. The uniforms of this era would feature on the organisation's Coat of Arms, which features two bearers wearing uniforms of the pre-Advance Party Report and some that were current at the time of the award in 1969. Certificates with the design would remain in use until May 2021.

In 2001, following a consultation process within the organisation, a new range of uniforms designed by Meg Andrews was launched on Founder's Day, 22 February.

=== Current uniforms ===
==== Squirrels ====
The Squirrels' uniform is a red sweatshirt, a neckerchief and a woggle.

==== Beavers ====
Beavers' uniform consists of a turquoise sweatshirt, a neckerchief and woggle. Uniform options decided on at the group level include navy blue shorts, a grey fleece jacket and a navy blue baseball cap. A navy blue skirt may be worn as a personal choice. Navy blue combat trousers (formally referred to as "activity trousers") and a turquoise polo shirt may be worn as activity dress.

==== Cubs ====
Cubs' uniform consists of a dark green sweatshirt, a neckerchief and a woggle identifying the cub's six (subdivision of a pack). Uniform options decided on at the group level include navy blue shorts, a grey fleece jacket, a navy blue jacket and a navy blue baseball cap. A navy blue skirt may be worn as a personal choice. Navy blue combat trousers and a dark green polo shirt may be worn as activity dress.

==== Scouts ====
Scouts' uniforms consist of a teal green long sleeved shirt or blouse, navy blue combat trousers (or navy blue skirt), group neckerchief, woggle and a Scout belt. Uniform options decided on at the group level include navy blue shorts, a grey fleece jacket, a navy blue jacket and a navy blue baseball cap. Navy blue combat trousers and a teal green polo shirt may be worn as activity dress.

Sea Scout uniform is the same as the main Scout uniform except a dark blue jersey and/or a light blue shirt or blouse are worn. Sea Scouts wear a round seaman's cap with "Sea Scout" a "Sea Scout" tally band. An additional group option is for a lanyard with a bosun's call.

Air Scout uniform is the same as the main Scout uniform except that the shirt/blouse is light blue and a blue-grey beret is worn.

==== Explorer Scouts ====
As for Scouts, but with a beige shirt or blouse and the explorer Scout belt may be worn. The optional activity uniform polo shirt is beige.

Explorer Sea Scouts wear similar uniforms except that a light blue shirt or blouse, smart navy blue trousers and a round seaman's cap with "Explorer Sea Scout" tallyband or a white-topped officer's peaked cap (depending on group). The lanyard and bosun's call is an option decided at group level. Explorer Air Scouts wear the light blue shirt or blouse, smart navy blue trousers and a blue-grey beret. Explorer Sea Scouts and Air Scouts may wear a blue tie instead of the neckerchief, an additional activity uniform top option for both units is a navy blue sweatshirt.

==== Adult participants (including Network) ====
As for Explorer Scouts, but with a shirt of a light khaki colour, described as "stone", which may be short sleeved. A tie may be worn by all adults and smart trousers may be worn instead of combat trousers. The activity uniform top is a navy blue polo shirt, an optional navy blue sweatshirt or stone-coloured polo shirt may be worn instead.

Adult leaders in Sea Scout units wear uniforms similar to Sea Scout explorers except that the only headgear is the officers hat and an option of a tricorne hat for women. Adult leaders in Air Scout groups wear uniforms identical to Air Scout Explorers.

==== Kilts ====
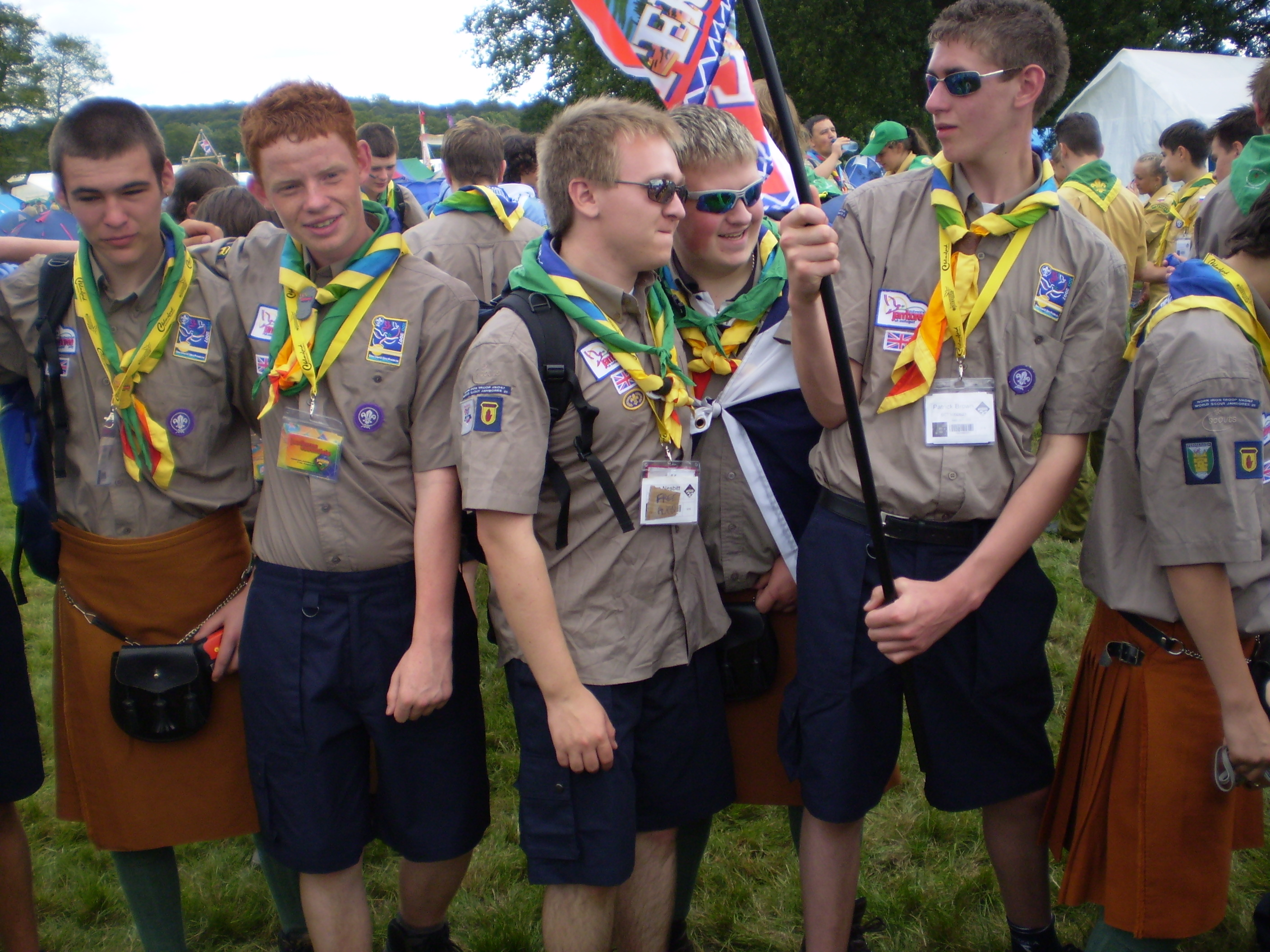
Explorer Scouts from Northern Ireland at the 21st World Scout Jamboree in 2007, wearing either activity shorts or the Irish saffron kilt

All participants in Scotland or those entitled to do so by descent may wear a tartan kilt or skirt. This can be either their own tartan or the Scout tartan pattern; to be worn with a plain leather sporran, green knee-length socks and garter tabs and black shoes. Participants in Northern Ireland or those entitled to do so by descent may wear a saffron kilt or skirt. This should be worn with a plain leather sporran; traditional coloured plain socks; black or brown shoes (all participants in a section should wear the same coloured socks and shoes). A tailored outer jacket may be worn with either kilt.

== Finances ==
The organisation is a registered charity. The organisation's finances are collected through a variety of ways. Participants pay for the organisation's programmes through an annual capitation or registration fee and subscriptions to the local group, paid termly, monthly or weekly depending on local preference. The registration fee pays for participant insurance and for the services and leader support provided by their district, country (or equivalent) and headquarters. The national registration fee for 2021–22, for all participants under 18, is £36.50 (or £36.00 for prompt payment by 23 April 2021), an increase of £7.50 compared to the 2020–21 fee. Of this, £1.50 is a reserved contribution ring-fenced to support any Groups who cannot access funding. Subs are used to pay for the day-to-day running of activities, pay for materials and to finance the section's meeting place.

To lessen the burden on participants, many Groups undertake local fundraising and utilise additional methods of funding, such as Gift Aid. In addition, headquarters operates several other ventures open to those outside of the organisation, the profits of which are returned to the organisation.

=== Scout Community Week ===
Scout Community Week is a campaign of the organisation and its biggest national fundraising event. It is a revival and updated version of the earlier "Bob-a-Job" Week (started in 1949) and later "Scout Job Week" in which participants were paid small sums of money for completing usually domestic tasks for local residents. The modern Scout Community Week involves participants from all sections of the organisation taking part in community work in exchange for a donation to the group. Re-introduced in 2012, the event has attracted media attention.

=== Commercial ventures ===
The organisation operates several ventures that offer an enhancement to its programmes but also services consumers outside its programmes. The profits are returned to the organisation to subsidise the running of the Scout programme and to reduce the burden of financing on the participants themselves.

The Scout Adventures brand is run directly from within the organisation and is responsible for running a network of national activity centres open to the organisation's participants and other organisations including schools and other youth groups. Its turnover and profits form part of the charitable activities of the organisation and contributed £4.9 million in the year up to 31 March 2020.

In addition, the organisation owns 100% of the following subsidiary companies which provide trading income to the organisation:

- Scout Shops Ltd trading as Scout Store sells the organisation's uniforms, equipment and gifts online and on the high street by supplying local Scout shops run mostly by Scout Districts. In the year up to 31 March 2020, it had a turnover of £9.4 million with their taxable profits of £3 million returned to the organisation.
- World Scout Shop Ltd sells similar merchandise and gifts to the Scout Store but to a global market along with exclusive WOSM items. It was created in 2011 at the 22nd World Scout Jamboree in Sweden and uses the same infrastructure as the Scout Store. In the year up to 31 March 2020, it had a turnover of £500,000 with their taxable profits of £30,000 returned to the organisation.
- Scout Insurance Services Ltd trading as Unity Insurance Services is an insurance broker providing insurance solutions tailored to the movement and other charities and similar non-profit organisations including Girlguiding. In the year up to 31 March 2020, it had a turnover of £2.4 million and a pre-tax profit of £1.2 million.
- Scout Insurance (Guernsey) Ltd. acts as the insurance underwriters for the organisation and Unity and paid its net profit pre-tax of £200,000 as a dividend to the organisation.
- Scout Services Ltd. manages the organisation's property, runs the conference centre located at Gilwell Park and manages sponsorship and marketing for the organisation such as selling advertising space in the Scouting Magazine. In the year up to 31 March 2020, it had a turnover of £3.8 million and a pre-tax profit of £700,000. This subsidiary has been hit hard by the COVID-19 pandemic as the organisation announced the cessation of the printed Scouting Magazine, the closure of the Gilwell Park conference centre and the selling of the 65 Queen's Gate site.

Former commercial ventures include the Scout Holiday Homes Trust which operated ten properties across the UK catering for those with low incomes or disabilities between 1969 and 2011 when the assets were transferred to the independent Holiday Homes Trust which maintains some links with the Scouts.

== Campsites ==
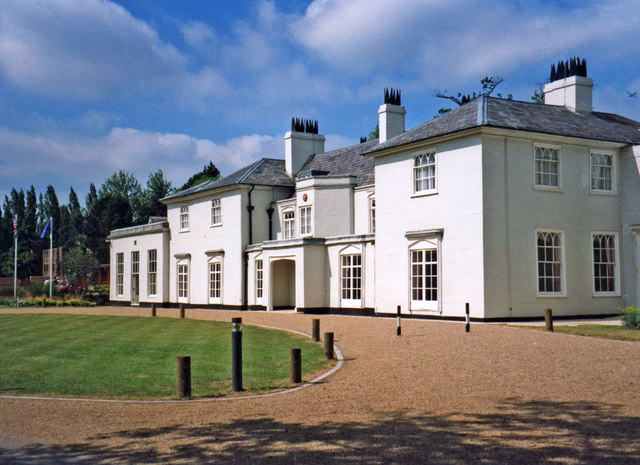
Gilwell Park's White House, the organisation's headquarters

Across the country, over 900 campsites are owned by the organisation; usually they are owned and operated by a Scout District or County. These campsites are also used by others outside the organisation to gain additional income for the Scout county or district.

Nine sites are branded and operated as Scout Adventure Centres, providing camping sites and affordable adventurous activities. These are:

- Gilwell Park on the London/Essex border
- Crawfordsburn in County Down
- Broadstone Warren in East Sussex
- Fordell Firs in Fife
- Great Tower in the Lake District
- Lochgoilhead on Loch Lomond
- Meggernie in Perthshire
- Youlbury in Oxfordshire
- Yr Hafod in Snowdonia

The organisation has a conference centre within Gilwell Park. It formerly operated Baden-Powell House, a hostel that provided low-cost accommodation for central London trips. Both these facilities were closed in 2020 due to the financial pressures of the COVID-19 pandemic.

== Scout Association overseas ==
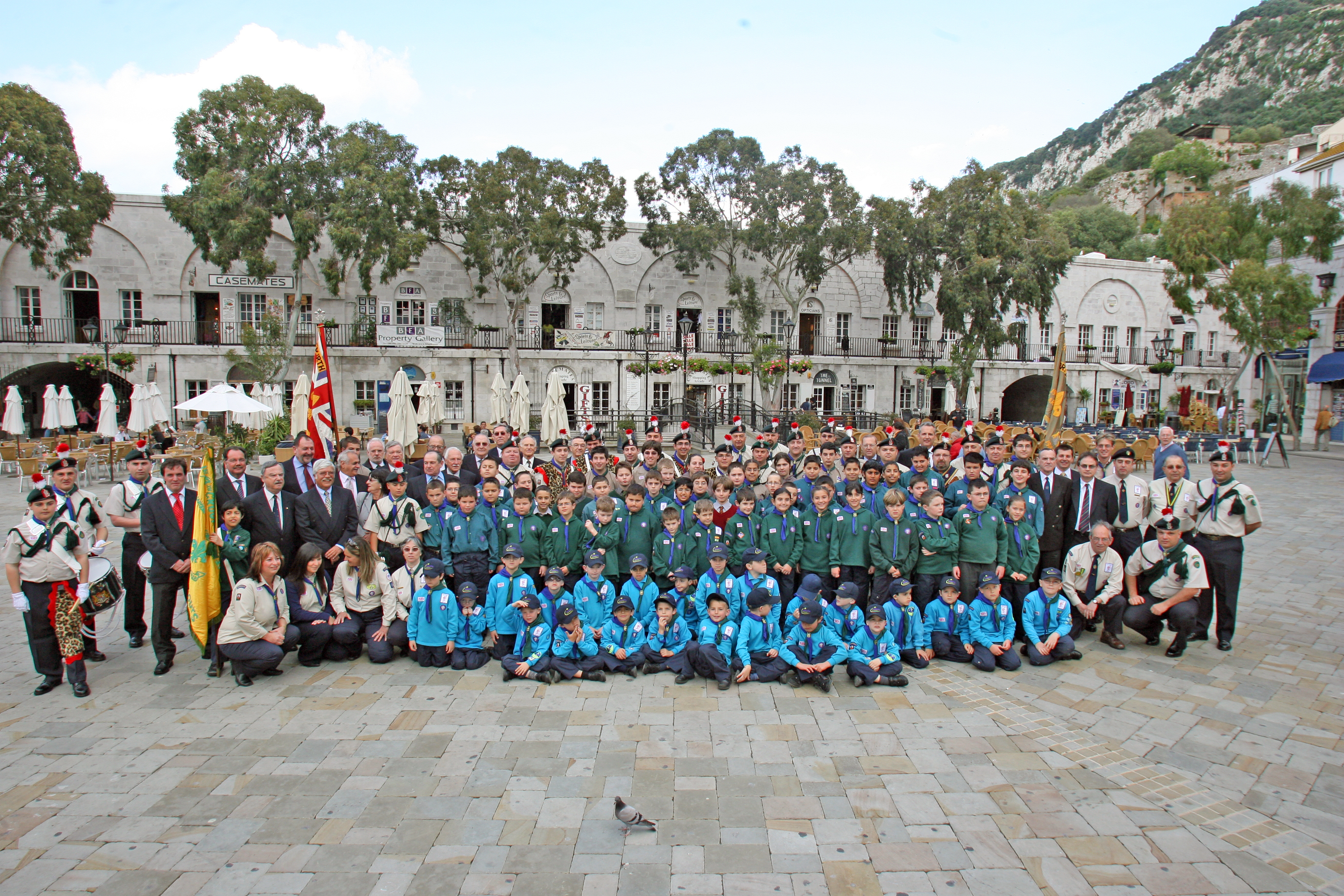
The 1st/4th Gibraltar Scout Group, an Overseas Branch of The Scout Association

=== History ===
Following the spread of the Scout Movement, Scout organisations formed in many parts of the British Empire. Some of these organisations later became branches of The Boy Scouts Association after its formation. In other cases, The Boy Scouts Association started branches itself in parts of British Empire. The Boy Scouts Association's "Headquarters" in London was renamed "Imperial Headquarters" (IHQ). The Boy Scouts International Bureau was formed in 1920 and became fully functional under the International Conference of the Boy Scout Movement in 1922. Subsequently, The Boy Scouts Association branches in the Dominions of Canada, Australia, New Zealand, Newfoundland and South Africa were given the option of being "separately represented" with the Boy Scouts International Bureau but chose instead to remain under IHQ control. Over time, many of the branches of The Scout Association became direct members of the World Organization of the Scout Movement; for instance, Scouts Canada in 1946 and The Scout Association of Hong Kong in 1977.

=== Overseas branches ===
The organisation has branches in the British overseas territories and Crown Dependencies, as well as some small independent nations. Non-sovereign territories in which the organisation operates programmes include:

- Anguilla
- Bermuda
- Cayman Islands
- Falkland Islands (Groups are part of the organisation's British Scouts Overseas Area)
- Gibraltar
- Montserrat
- Saint Helena (Groups are part of the organisation's British Scouts Overseas Area)
- British Virgin Islands
- Turks and Caicos Islands
- Isle of Man

Sovereign countries in which the organisation operates programmes, as they are without independent Scout organisations, include:

- Saint Kitts and Nevis
- Tonga
- Tuvalu
- Vanuatu

=== Organisation's operations overseas ===
The organisation's programme are offered to United Kingdom citizens living outside of the United Kingdom via the organisation's British Scouts Overseas Area (BSO). BSO has 4 Scout "Districts" in Southern Europe, Middle East, Northern Europe and Rest of the World and a total of 55 Scout Groups, in 26 countries. The organisation's Policy, Organisation and Rules (POR) apply within BSO.

BSO was formed on 1 April 2012, from an amalgamation of the British Groups Abroad and British Scouts in Western Europe Scout "Areas". At that point, there were 5 districts in France & Iberia, Middle East, Benelux & Scandinavia, Germany and Rest of the World. Since that point, Benelux & Scandinavia has merged with Germany to create the Northern Europe district. In June 2021, France & Iberia District transitioned into Southern Europe after the addition of a group in Italy.

== Relations with other organisations ==
=== Girlguiding UK ===
The Scout Association and Girlguiding UK are separate organisations but were both founded by Robert Baden-Powell and share similar aims and methods. Co-operation between the organisation and GirlGuiding UK is encouraged at all levels. 'Joint Groups' of Scout and Guide units meeting separately in the same headquarters and operating under the same support structure are recognized and encouraged by both organisations. It is also possible to have a 'Joint Unit', which may consist of Rainbow Guides and Beavers, or Brownie Guides and Cubs, or Guides and Scouts. They meet together as a single unit, sharing leadership and facilities but individual participants wear the uniform and follow the training programme of the organisation that they belong to. Members of Girlguiding UK are invited to join the United Kingdom Scout Contingent to participate in the World Scout Jamborees every four years.

=== The Scout Association in Ireland ===
The Scout Association of Northern Ireland co-exists in the province with Scouting Ireland which is the World Organization of the Scout Movement recognized organisation for the Republic of Ireland. The two organisations have been increasingly working in partnership; they jointly run a project called "Scoutlink" which delivers citizenship and peace building programmes with a range of groups in Northern Ireland and the border counties of the Republic.

=== The Duke of Edinburgh's Award ===
The Scout Association is one of more than 2,600 "Licensed Organisations" that operate the Duke of Edinburgh Award Scheme. Scout participation in the scheme started in February 1959, having been unable to join the 1956 experimental launch due to the 1957 Golden Jubilee of Scouting events and the 1958 revision of the Scout badge programme.

== Notable former UK Scouts ==
The organisation has had many notable past participants, with the following selection being the best known:

- David Attenborough – broadcaster and naturalist
- David Beckham – England international footballer and former captain
- Alex Brooker - television presenter and sports journalist
- Gareth Southgate - England football manager and football player
- Graham Norton - comedian, actor and television host
- Greg Davies - comedian and actor
- Eddie Izzard - comedian and actor
- David Bowie – singer-songwriter, producer and actor
- Jamie Oliver - chef, resteraunter and television presenter
- Andy Murray - former tennis player
- Noel Gallagher - musician and member of Oasis
- Bear Grylls – adventurer and television personality and the organisation's former Chief Scout
- Paul McCartney – musician and member of the Beatles and Wings
- John Lennon – musician and member of the Beatles (attended the 3rd Allerton Scout Group in Liverpool)
- George Michael – musician
- Keith Richards – musician and member of the Rolling Stones
- Richard Hammond – television presenter
- Ronnie Corbett – actor and comedian, one half of The Two Ronnies

== See also ==
- World Organization of the Scout Movement
- Boy Scouts of America
