= Squirrel Scouts (The Scout Association) =

Early childhood programme in UK

Squirrels
- Owner: The Scout Association
- Age range: 4–6
- Country: United Kingdom
- Founded: 2021
- Membership: 10,586 children, 860 groups (January 2023)
	Next; Beavers
- Website scouts.org.uk/squirrels

Squirrels is a programme operated by The Scout Association in the United Kingdom, imitating some aspects of Scouts but for much younger, infant children, usually between 4 and 6, who are too young to be Scouts and make the Scout Promise.

The programme was launched in September 2021. It remains a unique, proprietary programme. Some Scout organisations, particularly some Traditional Scouting organisations, have never adopted programmes for younger children at all, typically on the grounds that they were not part of Robert Baden-Powell's original programme and his warnings against too close identification of Scouts with juvenile programmes.

Squirrels make a simple promise to suit members' young ages, wear neckerchiefs in group colours, have award badges, have short meetings with early finishing times and are taught moral lessons (The Scout Law) through games and stories. A group of Squirrels is called a "drey". Dreys form part of a local scout group. After reaching the age of six, a Squirrel can move on to the association's Beavers programme.

== History ==
=== Northern Ireland Squirrel Association ===
The Northern Ireland Squirrel Association was an independent association that operated as a feeder organisation for some Scout Groups in Northern Ireland from the late 1990s. Like the Little Brothers and Beavers in Northern Ireland before them, the Squirrel Association provided a model for the Scout Association's later programmes for younger and younger children.

Dreys which were part of the Northern Ireland Squirrel Association will be merged into local Scout Groups.

=== Origin of name ===
Since 2001, The Fairly OddParents television series aired a parody of scouts called the Squirrel Scouts, which first appeared in its 8th short, over 21 years before The Scout Association introduced its programme under the same name. The name, Squirrels, was also influenced by the children's TV show Hey Duggee, aired since 2014, which has a Squirrel Club, resembling scouts, in which the members are called squirrels.

=== 2019—2021 pilot and launch ===
In 2019, the Scout Association launched its pilot of the programme, initially under the name Hedgehogs. It launched its pilot after competition from Girlguiding UK's Rainbow Guides which, since 1987, accepted members from age 5 (4 in Northern Ireland). Following the Scout Association's launch of Squirrels, Girlguiding UK reduced their entrance age to four in October 2021. The pilot programme was a way to increase participation and opportunities for volunteers and initially targeted black, Asian and minority ethnic (BAME) communities. The trials included some led by parents, schools and other early years settings and by the Scout Association itself. The trials were considered successful in reaching parts of the population previously underserved by the Scout Association and 60% of participants had no previous involvement with the Scout Association before the pilot. The impact of the COVID-19 pandemic in the United Kingdom on wellbeing and development of young children, particularly in more deprived communities, influenced the decision to launch the programme.

The Squirrels programme was launched on 9 September 2021. The choice of name was also influenced by the site of Robert Baden-Powell's 1907 Brownsea Island camp having a thriving colony of red squirrels.

At launch, in September 2021, there were 200 Squirrel dreys across the United Kingdom and by the end of November 2021, there were more than 350 registered.

The Scout Association piloted its first weekend camp for squirrels in October 2021. Squirrels participated in services for Remembrance Day in November.

== Programme ==
The Squirrels programme includes activities, games, exploring nature, visits and residential experiences with a focus on children "having outdoor adventures, making friends and learning". The programme's founders emphasise the importance of experiences in child development to the age of five years. Squirrels can earn badges.

Squirrels meetings may "start with a welcome ceremony, then... storytime and activities linked to that" and "lots of craft, music, singing and there's a real push to have community involvement, getting them involved in projects helping others". Children at a Squirrels launch event made "their own campfires using recyclable cups and tissue paper, a scout activity for small people."

=== Organisation ===
The core age range for Squirrels is between four and six years of age, which can be flexible in order to meet inclusion requirements.

Squirrels are attached to local Scout groups, led by a Squirrel leader often supplemented by basically trained assistants, and regular helpers, such as 14 – 18 year old Young Leaders if the Scout group has any available, as well occasional volunteer helpers who may be parents assisting as part of a rota. A group of Squirrels, referred to as a drey, usually meets early in the evening for 45 minutes to an hour.

=== Promise ===
Squirrels make a promise when they join the programme. Squirrels are not Scouts as they do not make the Scout Promise or promise to obey or keep the Scout Law and the Scout Law is not mentioned in the Squirrel promise.

The Squirrel promise used for Christians and Jews is:

I promise to do my best,
To be kind and helpful,
and to love God.

Muslims can replace the word God with Allah. Buddhists and Hindus can make no mention of a deity while those of no faith can substitute the word God with 'our world'.

Squirrels normally make their promise in a ceremony in front of family members.

The programme aims to begin teaching participants ideals of the Scout Association through informal means such as games and stories.

=== Awards and badges ===
Squirrels can gain awards and badges. These include twelve activity badges for specific skills and experiences, four challenge awards and a top award, the Chief Scout's Acorn Award. Squirrels can also earn staged activity badges which chart the development of specific skills.

=== Visual identity ===
==== Uniform ====
Squirrels have a uniform consisting of a red jumper and a neckerchief in group colours. This style is based on the appeal of primary colours to young children as well as being designed to help keep track of participants.

==== Logo and branding ====
The Squirrels logo consists of the word 'Squirrels' in red, with the initial 'S' forming a tail of a squirrel.

The logo and other branding were modelled on the wildlife (mainly the abundance of red squirrels) of Brownsea Island where Robert Baden-Powell held his 1907 Brownsea Island camp. The branding was designed by Supple Studios for the Scout Association.

== See also ==
- The Scout Association - owner, operator and parent organisation of the Squirrels programme.
- Beaver Scouts (The Scout Association) - The Scout Association's age programme that follows Squirrels.
- Age Groups in Scouting and Guiding
- Rainbows (Girl Guides) - competing Girlguiding programme targeting similar age group.
- The Fairly OddParents - had a parody of scouts in which Timmy Turner goes to a group called the Squirrel Scouts. The parody first appeared in the 8th short in 2001, over 21 years before The Scout Association introduced its Squirrel Scouts programme.
