= Young Leaders (The Scout Association) =

Youth Leadership by UK Scouting

- Owner: The Scout Association
- Age range: 14–18 years
- Country: United Kingdom
- Founded: 2001
- Affiliation: Explorer Scouts
| Previous; Scouts; Sea Scouts; Air Scouts | Next; Scout Network |
- Website http://www.scouts.org.uk

Young Leaders are Explorer Scouts who choose to provide leadership in Squirrel Scout Dreys, Beaver Scout Colonies, Cub Scout Packs or Scout Troops alongside adult volunteers as a part of the leadership team. Training of Young Leaders is achieved through eleven lettered modules covering the necessary skills to play an active part of the leadership team, with members challenged to apply what they have learned through four 'missions' in their sections.

Recognition of the scheme is achieved through a series of badges and culminates in the Young Leader belt buckle award which is worn with their uniform. The Young Leaders Badge is awarded upon the completion of the compulsory training module and is surrounded by one of four mission badges as each 'mission' is completed; the buckle is awarded only through the completion of every module and mission. The scheme has been popular with young people looking to volunteer in their community. Since its launch in 2002, the scheme has grown from 1,245 young leaders to 10,394 a decade later with transferable skills being highlighted as a benefit.

== History ==
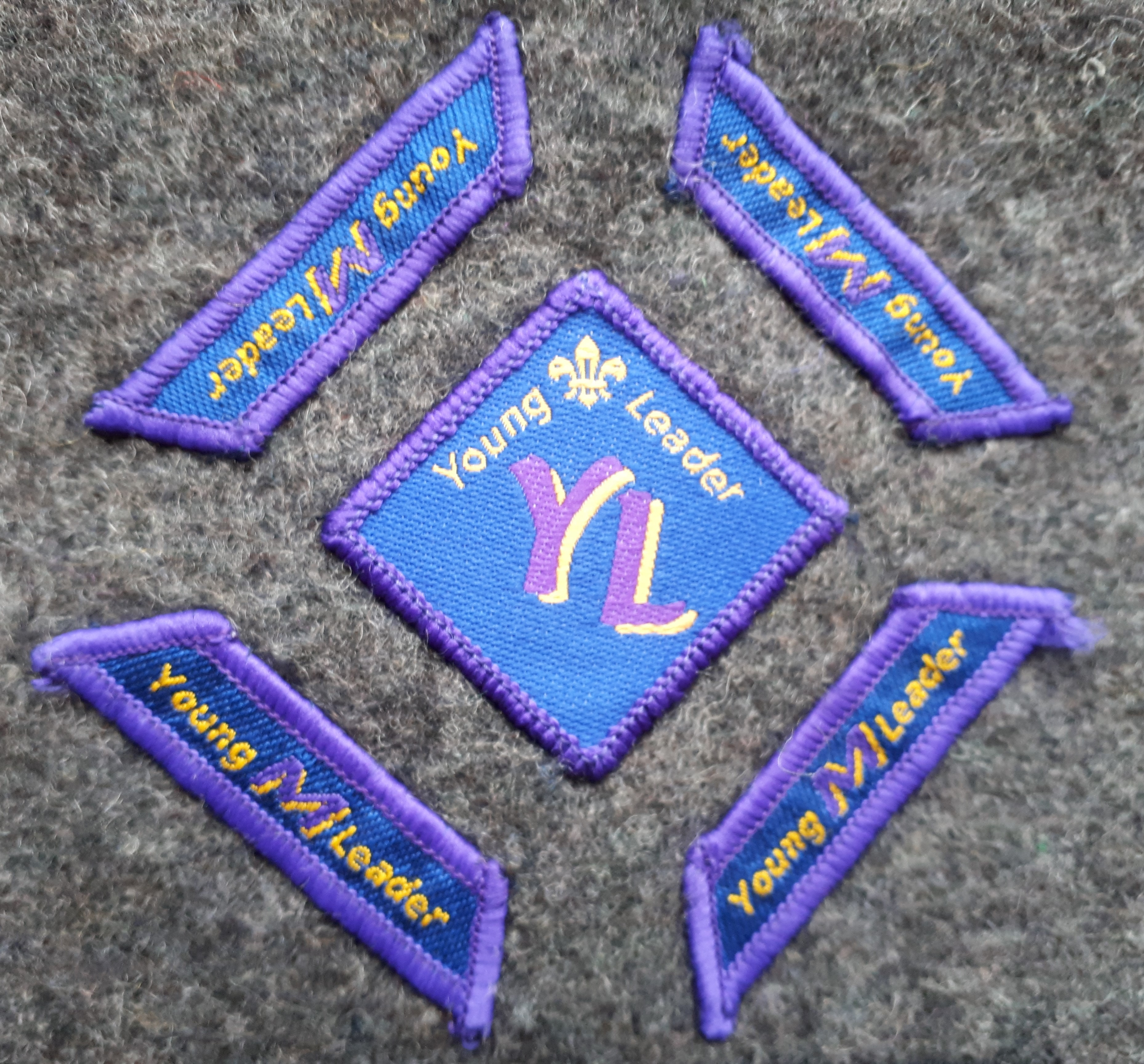
The 2003–2015 design of Young Leader award badges.

The Young Leader's scheme emerged in the early 21st century from the newly introduced Explorer Scouts programme for 14 to 18-year-olds, which was formally launched in 2002 following six years of reviews looking at the future of the movement and the youth programme. The full scheme launched in 2003, allowing Explorer Scouts and those of a similar age to volunteer with the younger sections as part of the leadership team. Training was split into self-contained modules, lettered for identification, to match the refresh in the adult volunteer training scheme that was launched in September of that year. Completion of the first module awarded the Young Leader with the diamond shaped badge, dark blue in colour with a purple border and 'YL' in the centre, while completion of the missions that put the learnt skills into action was recognised through a further trapezium-shaped badge being awarded that was placed around the edge of the original award. Completion of the full scheme, including all missions and modules completed, resulted in the award of the Young Leader's belt buckle to be worn with uniform.

The scheme was an unexpected success and the number of Explorer Scouts volunteering as Young Leaders had reached 10,394 by 2012, within the first 10 years of the scheme. That year the contribution made by Young Leaders was recognised by the Scout Association in evidence provided to Parliament's Education Select Committee linked to services to young people and the then current ideology of the big society. In it, the Scouts supported the creation of a National Citizen Service, believing that graduates of the scheme may seek to continue volunteering as a Young Leader while describing the benefits of the scheme saying that "It is our view that this exposes young people to a culture of volunteering at an early age and encourages them to take active leadership roles in their communities."

In 2015 the wider Scout programme was refreshed which included the Young Leader's scheme with the modules receiving updated content and delivery methods. The design of the badges and awards was also updated to an acorn and oak leaves to reflect the Gilwell Oak and the role of Young Leaders as future leaders of the movement. The Young Leader belt buckle was also added to the adult uniform and a recognition badge for the adult uniform added to mark a young person's time as a young leader upon becoming an adult leader.

== Membership and organisation ==
Members of The Scout Association's Explorer Scout section are able to become Young Leaders, instead of or in addition to the normal Explorer Scout programme, between the core ages of 14 and 18 years of age although they can join from 13.5 years of age. These full Explorer Scout Young Leaders wear the Explorer Scout uniform and make the promise like any other Explorer Scout as well as being able to take part in the full Explorer Scout programme.

In addition, 14 to 18-year-old members of Girlguiding and 14 to 18-year-old young people completing The Duke of Edinburgh's Award can become Young Leaders to complete the volunteering elements of their awards. They must complete training like other young leaders but cannot access the wider Explorer Scout programme and can only volunteer for a fixed amount of time.

The Young Leaders of a District are considered to be in a separate Explorer Scout Unit, and are under the supervision of an Explorer Scout Leader, although this may not always be the case, in which case the District Explorer Scout Commissioner or District Commissioner takes on this responsibility. A Young Leaders' Unit might have its own weekly programme, separate to other Units within the District, or may only provide training and possibly some other events in the year.

== Training ==
=== Modules ===
Young Leaders have a training programme, similar to that of adult leaders, comprising 11 self contained modules. These can be run individually over a longer time frame or combined into a longer course. These modules also count towards part of their Wood Badge if they choose to become an adult in Scouting at the age of 18, counting as prior learning.

- Module A – Prepare for take-off (Essentials and Expectations). Covers the values of the scout movement, health and safety of participants including the importance of risk assessments and the Young Leader's role in the safeguarding of members and child protection systems. It is the only compulsory module and must be completed within three months of starting with completion marked by the award of the Young Leader's badge.
- Module B – Taking the lead. Covers different leadership styles, the importance of self review and features of good leaders and teams.
- Module C – That's the way to do it! Introduces the concept of learning styles and different methods of instructing young people in skills, leading sessions and communicating.
- Module D – Understanding Behaviour. Introduces Young Leaders to the basics of behaviour management including causes and triggers for challenging behaviour and methods of managing behaviour.
- Module E – Game on! Covers different types of games, selecting games suitable to the programme and how to play them effectively.
- Module F – Making Scouting accessible and inclusive. Covers additional needs, making adjustments to the programme to accommodate young people with additional needs and makes reference to the Scout Equality policy and definitions of key terms.
- Module G – What is a high quality programme? Covers the Scout programme including badges and awards, reviewing the programme for quality and the importance of providing a balanced programme.
- Module H – Programme Planning. To be completed after Module G looking at programme, covers planning techniques and both longer term and individual session plans.
- Module I – What did they say? Covers the importance of getting feedback from section members and how to involve young people in the decision making of the section and programme plans. Links to the Scout youth empowerment initiative 'YouShape'.
- Module J – Communicate it! Covers adapting communication styles, aspects of non-verbal communication and communicating the skills learnt during the Young Leader's scheme to those outside of the movement including potential employers.
- Module K – First Aid. Trains the young people in first aid techniques to become a first responder in case of medical emergencies. It has the same content as adult leader First Aid training.

=== Missions ===
There are also four missions for Young Leaders to complete, which involve running games and activities for their relevant section. The purpose of the missions is to apply what has been learnt in their sections day to day, similar to the validation phase of adult Scout leader training. Upon completing each mission, an additional badge can be added around the edge of the standard Young Leader badge. Upon completing all modules and missions, Young Leaders are entitled to wear a Young Leader belt buckle to recognise this achievement.

- Mission 1 Run three games of different styles, including indoor and outdoor games, with their section.
- Mission 2 Run an activity that is not a game with their section.
- Mission 3 Gather the ideas and feedback of the section and present them at a programme planning meeting.
- Mission 4 Be responsible for organising and running a part of the programme such as a camp or night away, running a particular challenge award or exploring a wider skill.

== Links to other organisations ==
Part of the scheme's appeal is that volunteering with the Scouts as a Young Leader can contribute towards completing other awards and schemes by other youth organisations.

- Explorer Scouts and young people often partake in the Young Leaders scheme to complete the volunteering element of The Duke of Edinburgh's Award. Volunteering with the Scouts, including as a Young Leader, was the fourth most popular way for young people to achieve this part of the award in 2019. Additionally three top awards for Explorer Scouts, the Chief Scout's Platinum Award, the Chief Scout's Diamond Award and the King's Scout Award, are linked to the Duke of Edinburgh's Award (Bronze, Silver, and Gold, respectively) including the volunteering aspect.
- Members of Girlguiding aged between 14 and 18 years of age are able to become a Young Leader to complete any Girlguiding award that has a volunteering element. The Scout Association explicitly mention this is possible for the King's Guide Award although Girlguiding do not mention it explicitly in any of their literature.
- Some Scout groups since 2017 have been using the Young Leader's scheme to help deliver the National Citizen Service to encourage personal development, social mobility and cohesion and civic engagement. This was announced in July 2017 as part of a three-year pilot initiative. While the partnership was seen by some as a way of making the NCS more viable and connected into the wider youth sector, there were concerns that the £1,500,000 available to the partnership could be put to better use by partnering with other smaller organisations.

== See also ==
- The Scout Association – The parent organisation of the section.
- Explorer Scouts (The Scout Association) – Young Leaders form part of this section.
- Age Groups in Scouting and Guiding
- Ranger (Girl Guide)
- The Duke of Edinburgh's Award
