= Scouting in Northern Ireland =

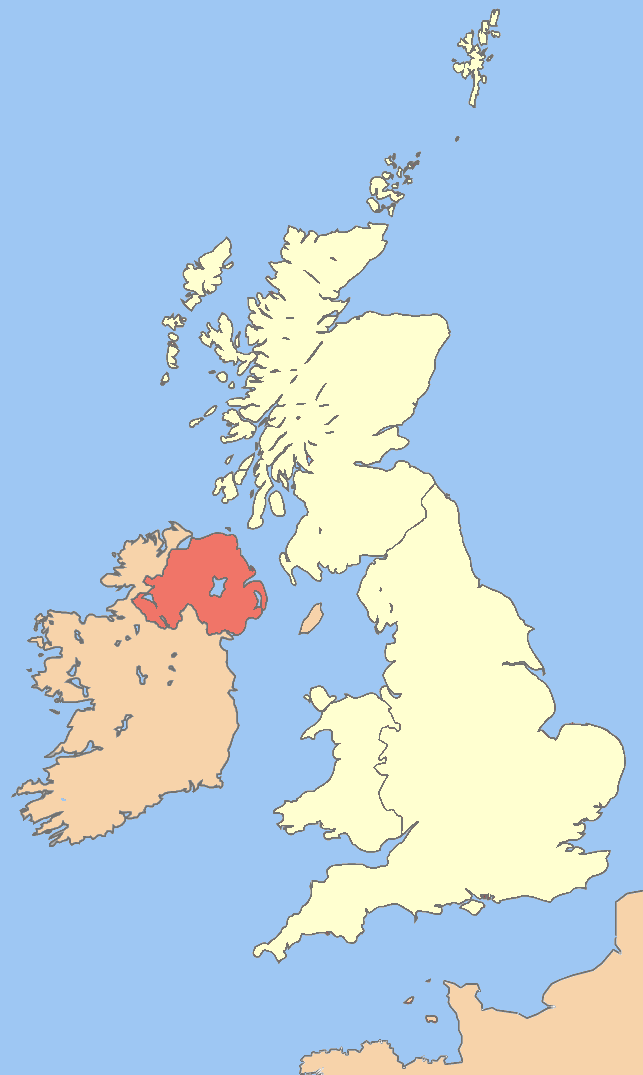

Scouting in Northern Ireland is represented by three Scouting associations:

- Scouts NI is part of The Scout Association of the United Kingdom, which is the World Organization of the Scout Movement (WOSM) recognized Scouting association in the United Kingdom.
- Scouting Ireland is the national Scouting association and the WOSM-recognized Scouting association for Ireland, although its membership extends to Northern Ireland, supported professionally by the Scout Foundation NI (SFNI). The predecessor for Gasóga na hÉireann - Scouting Ireland in the 6 counties was Gasóga Catoilicí na hÉireann - the Catholic Boy Scouts of Ireland (CBSI) and later Scouting Ireland CSI, which in 2004 merged with the Scout Association of Ireland (Scouting Ireland SAI) to become Scouting Ireland (SI)
- The Baden-Powell Scouts' Association is a member of the World Federation of Independent Scouts and operates one group in Northern Ireland.

== Overview ==
The Scout Association has 14 Scout districts which are grouped into 4 Scouting Regions (North, South, East, and West). These regions are overseen by the Northern Ireland Scout Council, known as "Scouts NI", which is a registered charity in Northern Ireland with charity number 103542. The Scout Association, Northern Ireland was an observer member of the Federation of Irish Scout Associations (FISA).

Scouting Ireland incorporates Northern Ireland as part of its Northern Scout Province and has five Scout Counties.

Scouts NI and Scouting Ireland has run a Scout Citizenship project to improve the relationship between the two Scouting associations in Ireland.

== History ==
120 Northern Ireland Scouts, along with 12 leaders, took part in the 21st World Scout Jamboree to celebrate the 100th anniversary of Scouting at Hylands Park near Chelmsford, Essex in 2007.

== Scout Counties ==
The Scout Association does not operate through counties.

The Scout Association
- membership badge
- Headquarters: Gilwell Park
- Country: United Kingdom
- Founded: 1908, incorporated 1912-01-04
- Founder: Baden-Powell
- Chief Scout: Dwayne Fields

=== Scouting Ireland ===
Scouting in Northern Ireland
- Country: Ireland (NI & ROI)
- Founded: 2004
- Membership: 33,971 (2006)
- Chief Scout: Christy McCann
- Website http://www.scouts.ie

==== Brian Boru Scout County ====
Brian Boru Scout County covers parts of County Armagh and County Tyrone with a total of 9 Groups. 1st Armagh (Armagh) 8th Armagh (Portadown) 12th Armagh (Slieve Gullion) 1st Down (Rostrevor) 1st Dromore (Newry) 5th & 6th Dromore (Lurgan) 7th Dromore (Craigavon) 1st Tyrone (Dungannon) 6th Tyrone (Cookstown) 14th Tyrone (Pomeroy)

==== Down & Connor Scout County ====
Down & Connor Scout County covers County Antrim, County Down and Belfast with a total of 15 Groups. The 2006 Phoenix National Patrol Challenge was held at Tollymore Forest Park County Down.

==== Erne Scout County ====
Erne Scout County covers County Fermanagh with a total of 7 Groups.

==== Errigal Scout County ====
Covers part of counties Tyrone, Londonderry and Donegal with a total of 17 Groups.

==== Dalriada Scout County ====
Covers part of counties Tyrone, Londonderry and Antrim with a total of 9 Groups.

== Camp sites ==
=== The Scout Association ===
- Ardnavally, located in Belfast. Owned and run by Lagan District Scout Council. Also houses the HQ of The Northern Ireland Scout Council (NISC)
- Baronscourt is a campsite in Newtonstewart, County Tyrone. It is on the Baronscourt Estate.
- Crawfordsburn is the Northern Ireland Scout Centre, 12 miles from Belfast. Adjacent to the Crawfordsburn Country Park, it consists of 22 acres (9 hectares) of camping ground including several accommodation buildings. It is a National Scout Activity Centre. Originally part of the Sharman estate, it opened for Scout camping in October 1948.
- Cladagh Glen Scout Centre is run by Fermanagh Scout Council.
- Tipperary Wood Campsite is run by 1st Newcastle Scout Group from Newcastle, County Down.

=== Scouting Ireland ===
- Castle Saunderson International Scout Centre is a cross-border Scout campsite on the border of County Cavan and County Fermanagh. While it is in the Republic of Ireland, the estate has an entrance in both Northern Ireland and the Republic of Ireland.

== Scout Sections ==
For details of sections in The Scout Association see The Scout Association Sections.

For details of sections in Scouting Ireland see Scouting Ireland Sections.

For details of sections in the Baden-Powell Scouts' Association see B-PSA Organisation.

Within Northern Ireland there was an affiliated feeder organisation, The Northern Ireland Squirrel Association, (NISA) which was for young people aged four and five years living in Northern Ireland. Following the launch of the Squirrel section across the UK in September 2021, NISA Dreys were merged into Scout Association Groups in the Province.

Beaver Scouts started in The Scout Association in Northern Ireland in 1965. With the help from the Northern Ireland Scout Association, Scouting Ireland started Beaver Scouts in 1979.

== Northern Ireland Squirrel Association ==
The Northern Ireland Squirrel Association was a youth organization which operated solely within Northern Ireland. It was a feeder organization to the Scout Movement in Northern Ireland as its membership was limited to four and five year olds who lived in Northern Ireland. The Aim of the Association was '...to promote the development of young people in achieving their full physical, intellectual, social and spiritual potential, as individuals, as responsible citizens and as members of their local, national and international communities.'

The Northern Ireland Squirrel Association became affiliated in 2009 with the Northern Ireland Scout Council which is part of The Scout Association. Each unit is called a Squirrel Drey and some are linked to Scout Groups.

Following a piloting exercising from 2019, The Scout Association launched its Squirrels nationally in 2021. The operations of the Northern Ireland Squirrel Association were merged into the Scout Association's Squirrels.

=== Youth programme ===
From late 2014 a badge programme was used which more closely aligned with the programme of The Scout Association. Four Smile badges could be awarded:

- Yellow: I'm active for taking part in new and energetic activities while learning about healthy eating and nourishing energy giving foods.
- Blue: I'm learning for learning new crafts, games and special skills while learning about being safe at home and outdoors and developing personal skills.
- Green: I'm friendly for making friends in the Squirrel Drey.
- Orange: I'm caring for care about what they do - how they behave, how they treat others and the world around them.

The development of this programme was funded by the Big Lottery Fund.

=== Uniform ===
Youth members wore a loose-fitting navy sweatshirt and were allowed to wear the scarf of a Scout Group with which they were linked. The provincial, county and district badges of The Scout Association could also be worn on the right arm. The Squirrel membership badge was worn on the left breast of the sweatshirt.

Following the affiliation with the Northern Ireland Scout Council there was a suggestion that Squirrel leaders should wear the adult uniform shirt of The Scout Association. This brought its own confusion for leaders who were also adult members of The Scout Association, as Squirrel Leaders were not able to wear the Membership Badge as the organization was not a member of the World Organization of the Scout Movement. Many Squirrel Leaders wore navy tops. After 2013 a new navy and lime Squirrel Association logo badge was worn on the right breast of such uniform.

== See also ==
- The Scout Association
- Scouting Ireland
- Scout merit badge (Ireland)
- Girlguiding Ulster
