= Drey =

Nest of a tree squirrel, flying squirrel or ringtail possum

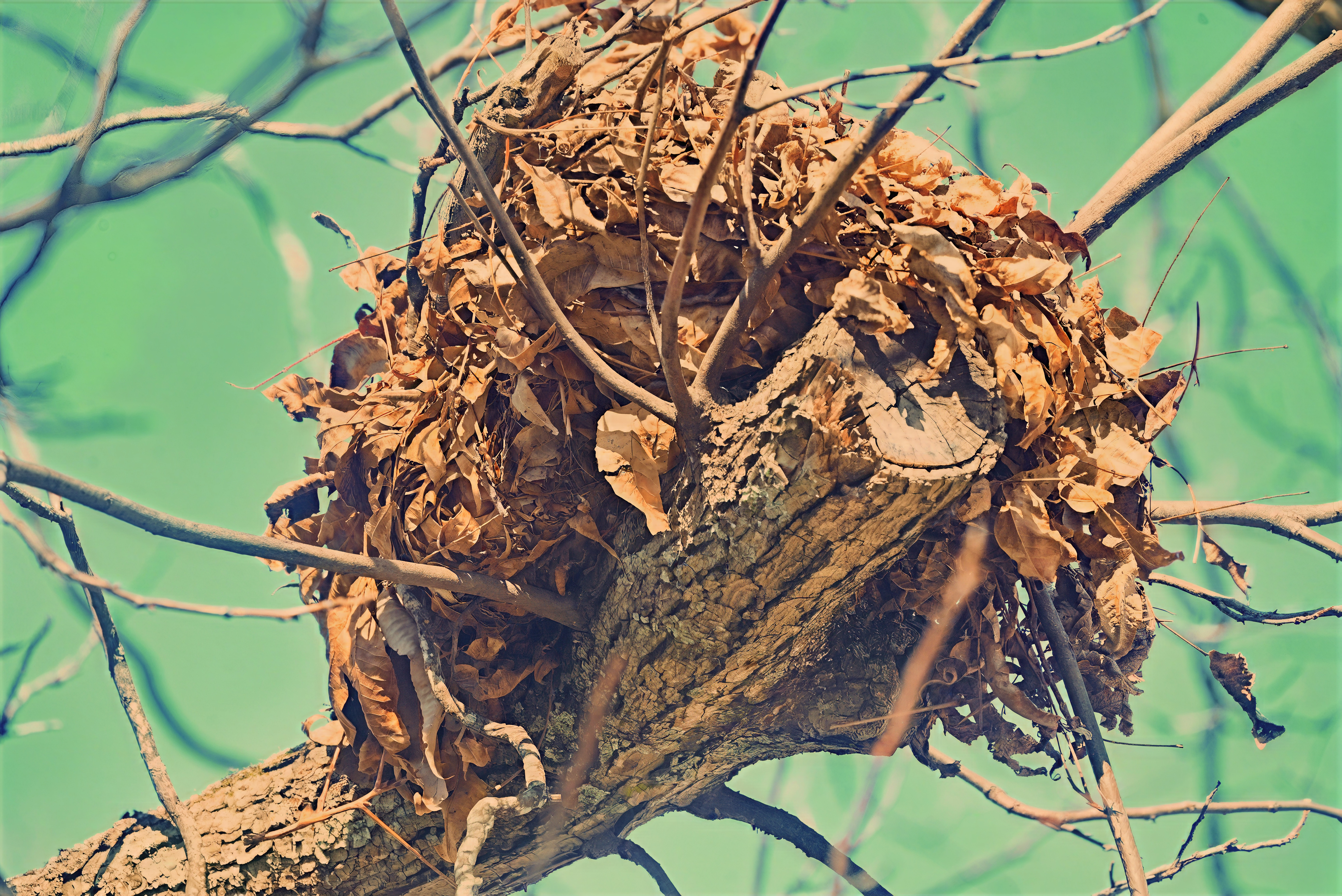
Drey in Rome, Georgia, US

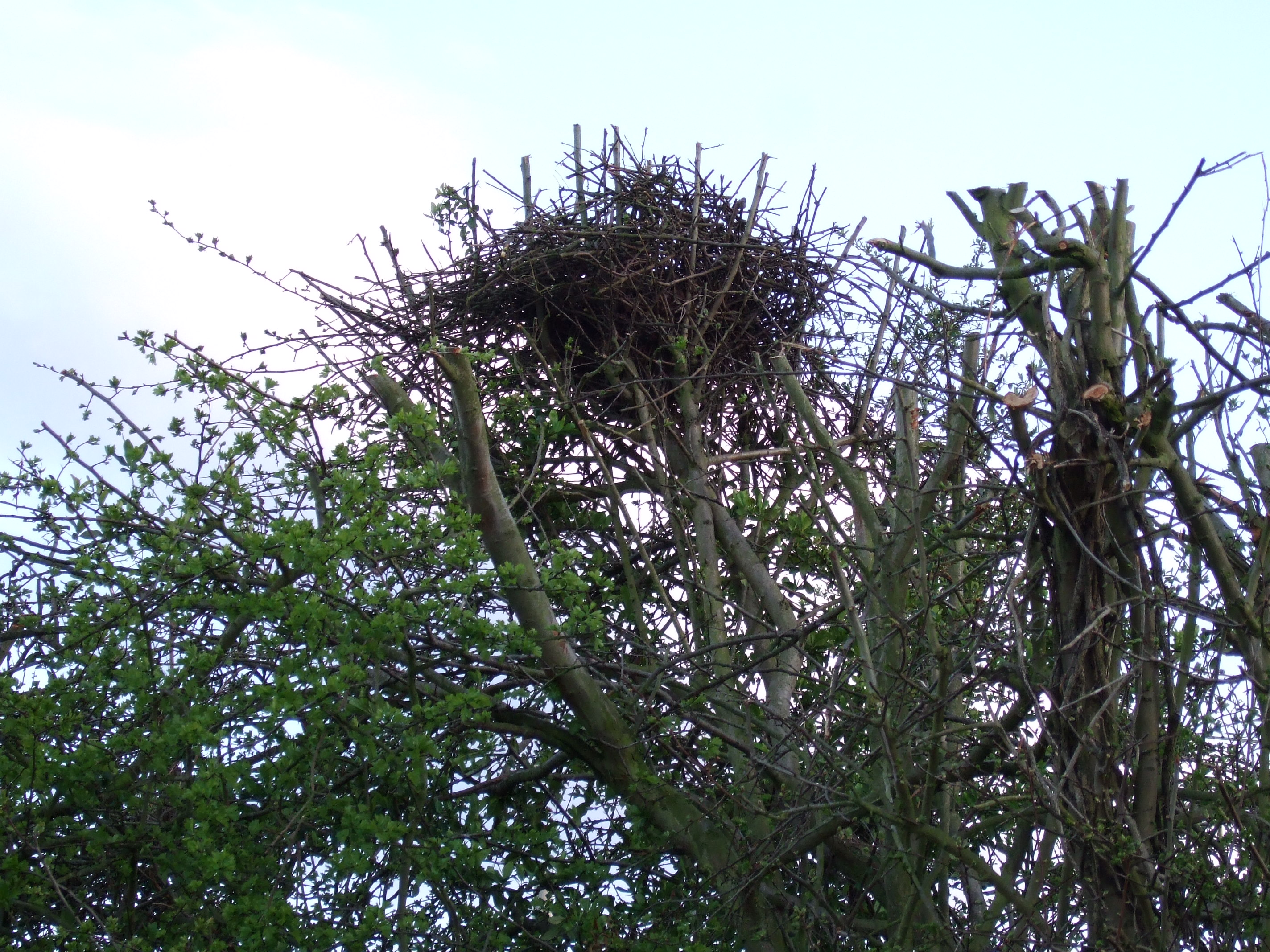
Eastern gray squirrel (Sciurus carolinensis) drey

A drey is the nest of a tree squirrel, flying squirrel or ringtail possum. Dreys are usually built of leaves and twigs, and typically assembled in the forks of a tall tree. They are sometimes referred to as "drey nests" to distinguish them from squirrel "cavity nests" (also termed "dens"). In temperate regions, dreys become much more visible in the autumn, when leaf-fall reveals new nests built the previous summer or in early fall.

A favoured site for a drey is a tree crotch about 9–12 metres (30–40 ft) above ground level. Squirrels may also nest in attics or exterior walls of buildings, where a drey may be regarded as a fire hazard, as some squirrels have a habit of gnawing on electrical cables. At other times, squirrels may inhabit a permanent tree den in the hollow of a trunk or large branch.

== Etymology ==
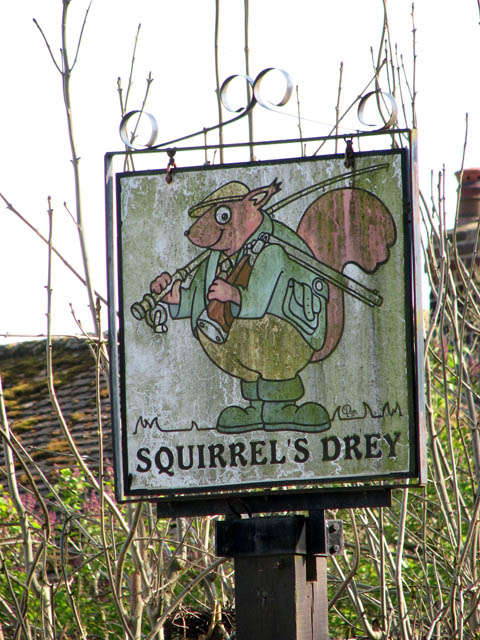
Sign for the "Squirrel's Drey" pub in Sporle, Norfolk, UK

The origin of the word drey is unknown, but has been traced in English to the early 17th century.

== Construction ==
In North America, dreys begin as a collection of small, gnawed-off branches bearing green leaves. The habit of harvesting these branches well before autumn (when the leaves would naturally fall) allows the leaves – though they turn brown – to adhere tightly throughout the winter. A finished drey is a hollow sphere, about 30 centimetres (12 in) or more in diameter, with branches and other rough-hewn materials loosely woven on the outside and an inner surface lined with a variety of finer materials, such as grass, moss, leaves, shredded bark or pine needles. There may be one, or occasionally two, entrance/exit holes in a drey, usually close to the bottom and oriented toward the trunk, which keeps rain out. A second hole is used for an escape route. The incomplete or flat dreys sometimes seen may be hot-weather sleeping platforms, or abandoned efforts built by very young, inexperienced squirrels.

Drey construction materials and sizes differ according to squirrel species and region. Eastern gray squirrels, for example, tend to use the leaves, bark and twigs of deciduous trees such as beech, elm, and oak. Southern flying squirrels will often employ fungal rhizomorphs, deciduous leaves, bark and twigs in their nests, while northern flying squirrels often use shredded cedar bark (among other types of bark), lichens, mosses, leaves and twigs in their dreys. In the Pacific Northwest, the northern flying squirrel employs the common Bryoria lichen as the primary material. A drey is almost always at least 6 metres (20 ft) above the ground, and flying squirrels build much higher.

Sometimes squirrels build their own dreys and sometimes they occupy a vacant drey that was previously constructed by another tree squirrel, often of a different species. Dreys must protect against the environment, and require constant upkeep to remain water- and predator-resistant. Squirrels often build more than one in a season, as reserve nests, lest the primary drey be disturbed by predators or overrun by fleas or lice. Some dreys have been observed in use for more than a decade by multiple generations of squirrels, although the average drey may be used only a year or two before being abandoned. If used repeatedly, squirrels must constantly maintain their drey, replenishing twigs and leaves as necessary. Remnants of an abandoned nest may be visible for years.

== Occupation ==
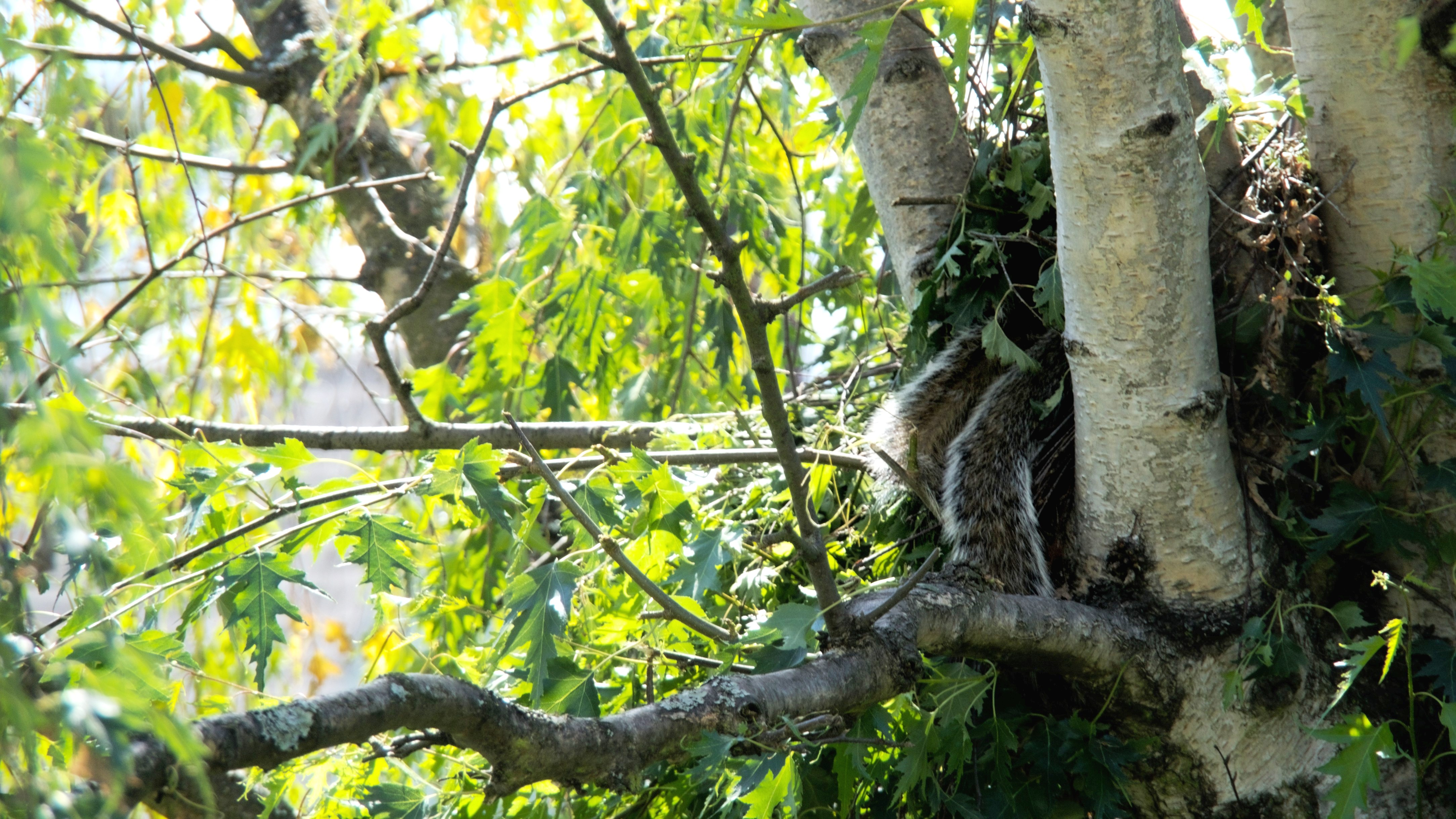
Two squirrels in the entrance of a drey

Male and female squirrels may share the same nest for short times during a breeding season, and during cold winter spells squirrels may share a drey to stay warm. However, females nest alone when pregnant. In North America, squirrels produce broods of about three "pups" twice a year. After leaving the drey, a young squirrel is termed a "juvenile" for its first year of life. The June broods are sometimes born in dreys, but January broods are usually born and raised in tree cavities, which are much safer. Drey broods are about 40% less likely to survive than tree cavity broods, so long as the cavity entrance hole is no wider than about 15 cm, which can keep out hungry raccoons.

== Extended use of the term ==
In the United Kingdom, Squirrel sections of the scouting movement, catering for children aged 4–6, are referred to as "dreys".
