= Rainbows (Girl Guides) =

Most junior section of the British guiding movement

Rainbows are the youngest section of Girlguiding in the UK. They are between the ages of 4 and 7. At the age of seven, a Rainbow will usually become a Brownie if she wishes to continue Guiding.

In the UK, Rainbows started in 1987, with Lynsey Hickling being the first in the UK.

In the United States the equivalent is a Daisy Girl Scout; in Canada the equivalent is a Spark; and in New Zealand they are called Pippins. In Australia, they are called Guides.

== Uniform ==
The current uniform, since 2004, consists of a blue and red polo shirt with the Rainbow logo on it, a red hooded jacket and a choice of either tracksuit bottoms, leggings or cycling shorts, which the girls are encouraged to pick themselves. All items come in the Rainbow colours of light blue and red. There is also an optional baseball hat which matches the other items. Tabards used to be part of the uniform, but were removed from the official uniform in 2015. Colours of tabards were red, orange, yellow, green, blue, and purple, and units were able to choose whichever colour they wanted. Red and purple tabards can still be purchased.

== Promise ==
The Rainbow promise is a shortened version of the Brownie and Girl Guides' promise, adapted to accommodate the Rainbows' young age. The promise is:

I promise that I will do my best, to think about my beliefs and to be kind and helpful.

== Programme ==
The Rainbow programme changed in 2018. It has 6 different themes that run through all sections of Girlguiding. They are: Be Well, Know Myself, Skills for My Future, Have Adventures, Express yourself and Take Action.

In each theme, for Rainbows, 1 skills builder, 3 hours of unit meeting activities and 1 interest badge has to be completed to gain the theme award. When 2 theme awards are completed, the Rainbow get her Bronze award, 4 themes earn the Silver award and all 6 themes plus 3 extra bits gains the Gold award. Activities range from games and crafts to leaning how things work, experimenting, basic survival skills and outdoor fun amongst other activities.

== Song ==
There are four versions of the song, each version has a different final three lines, but the tune is the same and the first verse remains unchanged. The four versions are for:

1. The beginning of a meeting
2. The end of a meeting
3. During a promise ceremony
4. During a "Pot of Gold Party"

This version is for the beginning of a meeting:

Look at the world around you,
Learn everything you can,
Laugh as you go along,
Love this world of ours.

Look, learn, laugh, love
Rainbows has begun,
We're all here now,
Come and join the fun.

At the end of a meeting the last three lines are replaced with:

We've had lots of fun,
Bye bye Rainbows,
Goodnight everyone.

At a Promise Party the last three lines are replaced with:

Promise time has come,
I will do my best
and help everyone.

This version reflects aspects of the promise itself and it helpful in reminding Rainbows of their duty.

The final version at a Pot of Gold Party is often sung for the rest of the unit by only those who are leaving for Brownies and this versions final three lines are:

Now the jigsaw is done,
New adventures,
Brownies here I/we come!

Whilst these songs are widely used, many Rainbow units use different songs.
