= Slovene Scouts and Guides in Carinthia =

Slovenski koroški skavti in skavtinje
- Slowenische Pfadfinder und Pfadfinderinnen in Kärnten
- Location: Carinthia

The Slovene Scouts and Guides in Carinthia (Slovene: Slovenski koroški skavti in skavtinje German: Slowenische Pfadfinder und Pfadfinderinnen in Kärnten) is the Scout and Guide association of the Slovene-speaking minority in Carinthia. It is affiliated to the Carinthia division of the Boy Scouts and Girl Guides of Austria as a Scout group. The association is coeducational.

== History ==
The first Scout group of the Slovene-speaking minority was founded in 1959 by the Catholic priest Janez Rovan SDB in Klagenfurt. It was registered as Klagenfurt 6 as a member of the Pfadfinder Österreichs Landeskorps Kärnten.

The home of the group was a boarding school. In 1970 the first Girl Guide patrol was established.

At the beginning of the 1980s there were 70 active members and a patrol in Bleiburg was founded. In 1984 the biggest camp of Slovene Scouts and Guides in Carinthia took place in Globasnitz. After the boarding school in Klagenfurt was disbanded, Bleiburg became the home of the Scouts and Guides.

The Slovene Scouts and Guides in Carinthia worked closely together with other Scout groups in Carinthia and with Slovene Scouts and Guides in Italy. After Scouting in Slovenia started again, there was also close cooperation.

In 1993, the Slovene Scouts and Guides in Carinthia left the Boy Scouts and Girl Guides of Austria.

In 2001, Slovene Scouts and Guides in Carinthia took part in the camp "Gelebte Nachbarschaft-Techuana 2001". This camp was organized by the Carinthia division of the Boy Scouts and Girl Guides of Austria, the Zveza tabornikov Slovenije, the Associazione Guide e Scouts Cattolici Italiani, the Corpo Nazionale Giovani Esploratori ed Esploratrici Italiani and the Deutsche Pfadfinderschaft Sankt Georg. The Slovene Scouts of Trieste also took part in this camp, as well as other Scout groups from different Scout associations.

After this camp, Slovene Scouts and Guides renewed their ties to other Scout groups in Carinthia, and rejoined the Carinthia division of the Boy Scouts and Girl Guides of Austria in 2003.

== Sources ==
- Krištof, Peter (2004). "Slowenische PfadfinderInnen in Kärnten / Slovenski koroški skavti in skavtinje" (PDF). Landesverbände. ppö brief (in German and Slovenian). No. 1/2004. Pfadfinder und Pfadfinderinnen Österreichs. p. 24.
- Hans Hopfgartner: Gelebte Nachbarschaft-Techuana 2001 (in German), special issue Gelebte Nachbarschaft-Techuana 2001, p. 4 in PPÖ-Brief 4/2001
