= Scouting and Guiding in Slovenia =

Scouting (and Guiding) in Slovenia is served by three associations:

- Zveza tabornikov Slovenije (ZTS, Scout Association of Slovenia), member of the World Organization of the Scout Movement (WOSM)
- Združenje slovenskih katoliških skavtinj in skavtov (ZSKSS, Slovenian Catholic Guides and Scouts Association), member of the World Association of Girl Guides and Girl Scouts (WAGGGS)
- Zveza bratovščin odraslih katoliških skavtinj in skavtov (ZBKOSS, Slovenian National Scout and Guide Fellowship), member of the International Scout and Guide Fellowship (ISGF).

Despite the split membership in the different world organizations, ZTS and ZSKSS are both coeducational. Participation in WOSM and WAGGGS events is open to individual members of both associations.

Slovene minorities in the adjacent countries are served by two organizations:

- Slovenska zamejska skavtska organizacija (SZSO) serving Slovenes in Friuli-Venezia Giulia, affiliated to ZSKSS and cooperating with the Italian Associazione Guide e Scouts Cattolici Italiani. Before the rebirth of independent Slovenian Scouting in 1990, SZSO acted as a Scouts-in-Exile organization.
- Slovenski koroški skavti in skavtinje (SKSS) serving Slovenes in Austria, affiliated to the Pfadfinder und Pfadfinderinnen Österreichs.

The Slovene noun for a single Scout is tabornik or skavt depending on the organization.

== History ==
The history of Scouting in Slovenia dates to when Slovenia was a part of the former Kingdom of Yugoslavia, and possibly back to 1915. In 1922, a meeting of Sokol, an important political and sporting movement in Yugoslavia, took place in Ljubljana, and Bosnian and Serbian Scouts attended. Scouting was officially established in Slovenia in October 1922, when a large number of Scout groups in Slovenia contributed to the establishment of the Scout Parish for Croatia and Slovenia, founded in Osijek. The Slovenia Scout Region was established in early 1923 in Ljubljana. The first Slovene Scout and Guide camp was organized during the summer of 1923 at a Slovene alpine resort. Scouting in Slovenia was officially dissolved on June 10, 1941 because of World War II. Just prior to the dissolution, there were 1,380 members of the Slovene Scout Organization.

Scouting in the Socialist Federal Republic of Yugoslavia was coopted by the Tito government in 1950, at which time WOSM membership was forfeited. In 1951, individual Scout associations were founded in all then-Yugoslav republics, as branches of Savez Izviđača Jugoslavije. The first of these was Zveza tabornikov Slovenije (ZTS) in Slovenia.

Slovene Scouting also continued in exile, at first in refugee camps, and afterwards in Argentina and Canada, and in the Slovene ethnicity nearby Gorizia and Trieste. The Movement also revived among the Slovene ethnic groups in neighboring countries: The Slovene Carinthian Scouts (in 1957) in Austria (today part of the Pfadfinder und Pfadfinderinnen Österreichs); the Slovene Scouts of Trieste (Slovenske Zamejske Skavtske Organizacije (SZSO) Trst) in 1951 for boys and in 1958 for girls; and the Slovene Scouts of Gorizia (SZSO - Slovenski goriški skavti), in 1963 for girls and 1964 for boys.

In 1984, a secondary school student from Ljubljana, Peter Lovšin, became acquainted with the Scout Movement. He decided to begin apolitical Scouting in Ljubljana. In the summer of 1985 he went to camp with Scouts of Gorizia, and in 1986 he made the Scout Promise as one of their rank. In the same year he gathered a group of young people around him in one of the Catholic parishes of Ljubljana, with assistance from Scouts of Trieste and Gorizia. The group was growing and in autumn 1988 moved to another parish of Ljubljana. On Saint George day in 1989, 12 boys and girls made the Scout Promise, and by 1990, there were 21 Girl Guides and 18 Boy Scouts. The Catholic Scout Movement began to spread all over Slovenia. On March 31, 1990, the Združenje slovenskih katoliških skavtinj in skavtov (ZSKSS) was founded. The first legal Scout Promises were made by 29 Girl Guides and Boy Scouts, in a suburb of Ljubljana on May 20 of that year. Officially the ZSKSS was registered on Sunday, October 22, 1992.

In 1994, ZTS became the 138th member of WOSM. Two years later, ZSKSS was accepted as associate member of WAGGGS. ZSKSS received full membership in WAGGGS in 1999.

Associazione Guide e Scouts Cattolici Italiani, specially leaders from Friuli-Venezia Giulia, has been actively involved in the growth of Scouting in Slovenia.

== International Scout units in Slovenia ==
In addition, there are USA Girl Scouts Overseas in Ljubljana, serviced by way of USAGSO headquarters in New York City.

== Sources ==
- World Association of Girl Guides and Girl Scouts, World Bureau (2002), Trefoil Round the World. Eleventh Edition 1997. ISBN 0-900827-75-0
