= Scouting and guiding in Italy =

Scouting and guiding in Italy consists of several associations and federations, including more than 225,000 male Scouts and female Guides.

Next to Germany, France and Russia, Italy is the country with the most fragmented Scout movement, but it is also one of the few countries where the single largest association, in this case the Associazione Guide e Scouts Cattolici Italiani, is denominational and comprises more of 80% of the country's Scouts and Guides. Also, counting the other Catholic associations, more than 90% of the Italian Scout movement is Catholic (roughly reflecting distribution of religion in Italy).

== History ==
The first attempts at Scouting in Italy go back to 1910. They are due in part to the meeting between English gentlemen, who were directly influenced by the work and ideas of Robert Baden-Powell, and Italian educators already engaged in pedagogical activity within the new education of the beginning of the century.

The meeting between teacher Remo Molinari and Francis Vane, an old aide of Baden-Powell's and a former Scout Commissioner of London before Baden-Powell ousted him from The Scout Association, led to the founding of the Ragazzi Esploratori Italiani (Italian Boy Scouts, REI) on 12 July 1910 in Bagni di Lucca, Tuscany. The press coverage and the presence of King Vittorio Emanuele III at San Rossore on 6 November 1910 gave much publicity to their initiative. This saw the creation of new troops under the name of Ragazzi Patrioti in three Tuscan cities Lucca, Pisa and Florence. The interest of authorities and educators peaked in Genoa, Liguria and Milan, Lombardy. The organization was also known with other names, including Boy Scouts della Pace (Peace Boy Scouts, BSP).

Another meeting in 1910, between English doctor and educator James Richardson Spensley, who had met Baden-Powell, and Mario Mazza, a Catholic educator from Genoa, would bear more durable fruits for Italian Scouting. In 1905 Mazza had founded Juventus Juvat, a movement of active education divided in groups of girls known as Gioiose ("Joyful"). Mazza understood that the principles and methods of his organization would better work out within the Scout movement, as he knew it from meeting Spensley and attending a conference given by Vane. This would later expand into all of Liguria and also in Florence and Naples, by the way of absorbing some of the REI's troops.

Vane was busy with all these initiatives and qualified them as the Italian section of the British Boy Scouts, which he had founded in England after he was expelled from The Scout Association. This lasted until 1914, when Vane was called to war. By that time, however, the REI had disbanded, and in 1912 the Corpo Nazionale Giovani Esploratori ed Esploratrici Italiani (CNGEI) had been founded. For this reason, the official birthdate of Scouting in Italy is often listed as 1912.

In 1916 the Associazione Scouts Cattolici Italiani (ASCI) was founded, while in 1943 its female counterpart, the Associazione Guide Italiane (AGI), was launched. The two Catholic associations were merged in 1974 in order to form the Associazione Guide e Scouts Cattolici Italiani (AGESCI). Some ASCI and AGI leaders, who had disagreed with the merger (and, above all, opposed the principle of coeducation) and had refused to join AGESCI, formed the Associazione Italiana Guide e Scouts d'Europa Cattolici (AIGSEC or Scouts d'Europa), along with disgruntled members of the early AGESCI, in 1976.

A separate Scout association existed at Trieste.

Italy was a founding member of the World Organization of the Scout Movement (WOSM) in 1922 and, after its suspension during the Fascist regime, was readmitted to WOSM in 1946. Since 1986 AGESCI and CNGEI are associated within the Italian Scout Federation (FIS), Italy's national member of the WOSM and the World Association of Girl Guides and Girl Scouts (WAGGGS). FIS is nothing more than a formal coordination as AGESCI and CNGEI operate as separate entities.

== Associations ==
This is a list of the main Scouting and Guiding associations in Italy.

- Federazione Italiana dello Scautismo (FIS), member of WOSM and WAGGGS, including:
  - Associazione Guide e Scouts Cattolici Italiani (AGESCI), 184,000 members
    - affiliated associations: Südtiroler Pfadfinderschaft (SP), 600 members, and Slovenska Zamejska Skavtska Organizacija (SZSO)
  - Corpo Nazionale Giovani Esploratori ed Esploratrici Italiani (CNGEI), 14,000 members
- Associazione Italiana Guide e Scouts d'Europa Cattolici (AIGSEC–FSE), member of the UIGSE, 20,000 members
- Movimento Adulti Scout Cattolici Italiani (MASCI), member of the ISGF, 6,000 members
- Federazione del Movimento Scout Italiano (FederScout), member of WFIS, 4,000 members, notably including:
  - Associazione Giovani Esploratori Sardi (AGES, Sardinia), 700 members
  - Associazione Veneta Scout Cattolici (AVSC, Veneto), 500 members
- Associazione Italiana di Scautismo Raider (AssoRaider), member of WFIS, 2,000 members
- Associazione Scautistica Cattolica Italiana (ASCI or Nuova ASCI), member of CES, 1,500 members
- Associazione Esploratori e Guide d'Italia (AEGI), member of WGIS, 1,000 members
- Associazione Guide e Scouts San Benedetto'' (AGSSB, Sicily), 800 members
- Associazione Indipendente Scout (AssiScout), member of WFIS, 500 members
- Hashomer Hatzair Italia, Italian section of Hashomer Hatzair, 400 members
- Associazione Amici delle Iniziative Scout (AMIS, Trieste), member of WFIS
- Associazione Italiana Scout Avventista (AISA), member of Pathfinders
- Associazione Scout Evangelici Italiani (ASEI)
- Royal Rangers Italia, Italian section of the Royal Rangers

== International units ==
- Združenje Slovenskih Katoliških Skavtinj in Skavtov, whose sister-association, the aforementioned Slovenska Zamejska Skavtska Organizacija, is also affiliated to AGESCI while not being part of it and serves the Slovene minority in Friuli-Venezia Giulia
- Boy Scouts of America, served by the Transatlantic Council
- Girl Scouts of the USA, served by USA Girl Scouts Overseas—North Atlantic (NORAGS)
- The Scout Association (United Kingdom), served by British Scouts Western Europe, German District
- Girlguiding (United Kingdom), served by British Guides in Foreign Countries
- Vietnamese Scout Association-Hoi Huong Đao
- Scouts unitaires de France

== Scoutball ==
Scoutball is a team sport in which two teams, usually of seven players each, score points against one another by grounding the ball behind the goal line. Scoutball derived from the Scout movement. It is a simple game that does not need particular equipment, tries to limit the physical contact between players and gives attention to the typical outspokenness and fair play of Boy Scouts. Scoutball is inspired by many common sports.

The rules of this game are affected by the locality of the Scout movement so it is difficult to focus on Scoutball like one sport. However, some rules are always used. Every player takes care about his own scalp on his bottom like in flag football or in tag rugby. The meaning of a scalp is to limit the physical contact between different players. The match is played on the grass like in a football pitch. The aim is to ground the ball behind the goal line of the opposite team scoring a point with a try. A player is stopped by taking his scalp while he has the ball. After that, the ball is given to the opposite team and the player goes outside the match until the next try. The players usually use a handball ball or rugby ball to play.

Scoutball has grown up at very high levels in Italy. Italian Scouts usually organize many local or regional championships (especially in the city of Bologna and the region of Veneto). In Bologna there's a group of Boy Scouts and Scout leaders that has focused on developing this sport, they set up standard rules to standardize the game. Since 1997 there is an Italian Scoutball championship in the city of Bologna where Boy Scouts of every Scouting association meet from all Italy. During the Scouting 2007 Centenary there has been a big championship. On YouTube there are many videos of the last championships.
