= ASCI =

ASCI or Asci may refer to:

- Advertising Standards Council of India
- Asci, the plural of ascus, in fungal anatomy
- Accelerated Strategic Computing Initiative
- American Society for Clinical Investigation
- Argus Sour Crude Index
- Association of Christian Schools International
- Associazione Scouts Cattolici Italiani, co-founder of Associazione Guide e Scouts Cattolici Italiani
- Administrative Staff College of India, Hyderabad
- ASTAR Scrabble Challenge International (ASCI)
- Accountable, Support, Consult, Inform (roles in a project)
- Adaptive Sampling Configuration Interaction, a method in quantum chemistry

== See also ==
- ASCII
