= Scout group =

Organizational structure used in some Scout organizations

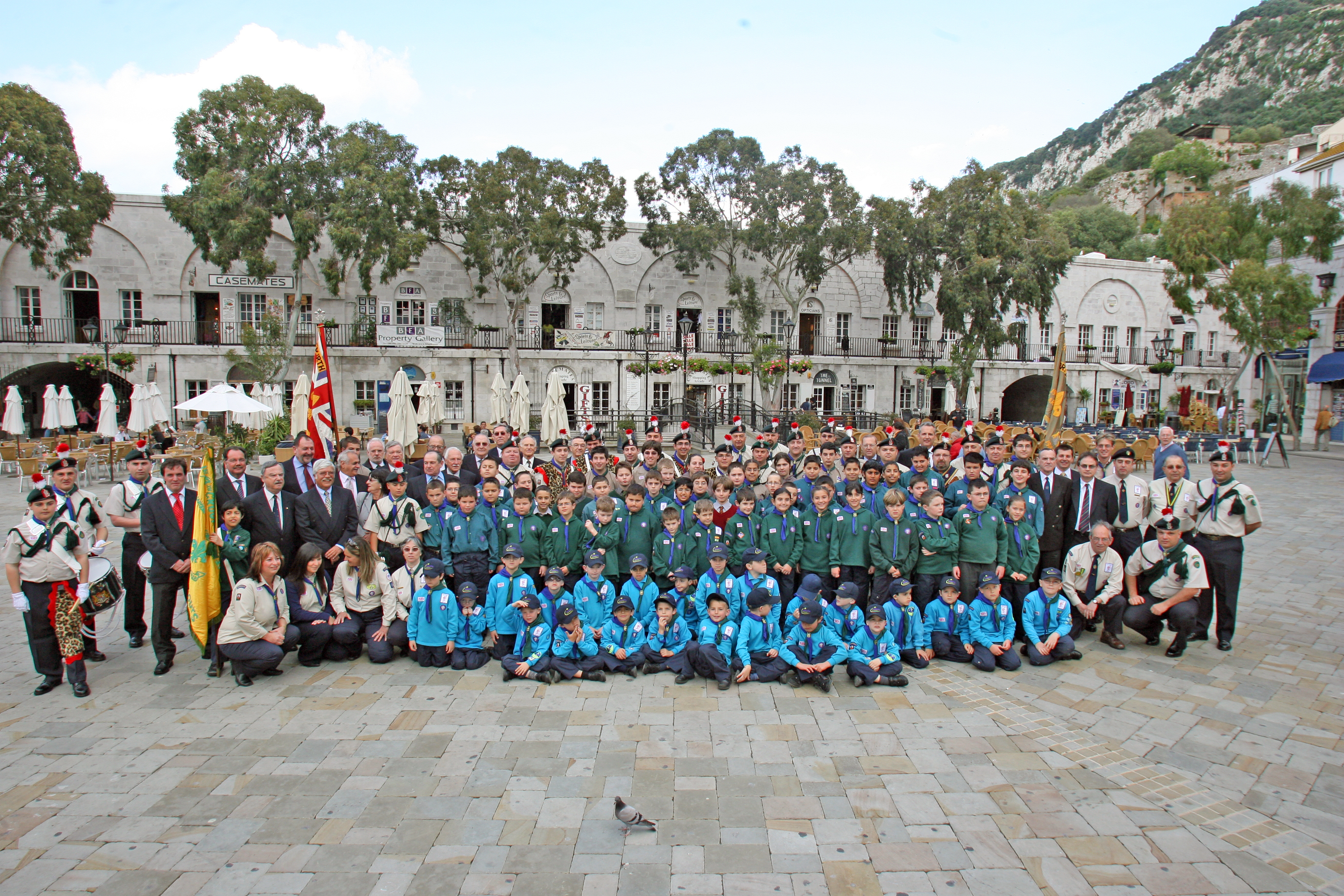
The 1st/4th Gibraltar Scout Group, an Overseas Branch of The Scout Association of the United Kingdom.

A Scout group is a local organization used in some Scout organizations that groups a Scout troop or unit with other age programs, separate gender-based Scout troops and/or multiple Scout troops.

A Scout group that groups Scouts with programs for other ages, is referred to as "family scouting". (Note: According to one organization, "The local group should in fact be viewed as a kind of educational centre, which is capable of implementing the whole Scout programme, from childhood until the end of adolescence. The units in the different sections have to be part of a local group and not isolated.") Some Scout organizations, particularly traditional Scout organizations, reject connection of Scouts with other age programs and family scouting.

== History ==
The term "Scout Group" was used for an organizational structure as early as 1914 by a competing Scout organization to The Boy Scouts Association in the United Kingdom.

The Boy Scouts Association adopted the term Scout Group in 1928 for Boy Scout Troops, Wolf Cub Packs and/or Rover Crews that were linked together under a Group Scoutmaster. Previously, The Boy Scouts Association had registered Boy Scout Troops, Wolf Cub Packs and Rover Crews separately even where they were operated by the same committee, school, church or other organization. Many Scout Groups had already effectively existed but were not formalized by The Boy Scouts Association. At The Boy Scouts Association's Bournemouth Conference of April 1927, John Frederick Colquhoun presented a paper titled 'The position of Rover leaders' which resulted in discussion on co-ordination (i.e. who was in charge) between Wolf Cubmasters, Scoutmasters and Rover leaders that led to the establishment of the Scout Group organizational structure and new rank of Group Scoutmaster from 1 January 1928.

== By country ==
=== Argentina ===
In Scouts de Argentina, the Scout group is the basic organizational structure of the association, through which the Educational Program for young people is implemented.

Scout groups can be homogeneous or heterogeneous, both in terms of the religion practiced by their members, their nationality, the sponsoring institution to which they belong, or the corresponding community.

=== Australia ===
The Scout Association of Australia is organised similarly to its parent organisation in the United Kingdom, though the leader in charge is known as the Group Leader or, if there is no Group Leader, Leader-in-Charge, the adult leader nominated to liaise between the group and the Association. As in the United Kingdom, a unit for older scouts (Venturers) can be group-based or district-based, depending on the numbers. Rover Crews can be associated with a group or stand alone. In most of the Association's state or territory branches, groups are registered to a local district. A group can combine a Scout troop, an older aged scouts (Venturer) unit with units for other age program - Joeys, Cubs and Rovers. A Sponsored group is a Scout group of another body such as school or church which is registered with the Scout Association and delivers a slightly altered program in conjunction with its parent body.

=== Italy ===
Scouting and Guiding in Italy is very fragmented. There are two World Organization of the Scout Movement and World Association of Girl Guides and Girl Scouts recognized Scout and Guide associations (which together form Federazione Italiana dello Scautismo).

In Associazione Guide e Scouts Cattolici Italiani (AGESCI), the Italian Catholic Guides and Scouts association, the group structure is very important. A typical Scout group is composed of a pack, a troop and a Rover crew. Sometimes, some of these units might be duplicated. Each Scout group has a "Comunità capi" (leader's community) where all adult leaders belong. It meets quite often to plan all educational activities in the Scout group. Its work is driven by a three-year plan. This plan (Progetto Educativo di Gruppo) gives a common thread to the programme of all units, ensuring a common focus across all age ranges.

In Corpo Nazionale Giovani Esploratori ed Esploratrici Italiani (CNGEI) each Scout group can only include at most one pack, a troop and a rover crew. All the Scout groups in the same town compose a section. Adults are registered at the section level instead of the group level.

=== United Kingdom ===
Scout Groups in the United Kingdom can have any number of Squirrel Dreys, Beaver Colonies, Cub Packs and Scout Troops. Explorer Scout units and Scout Network units are operated at a District level, which encompasses a number of Groups across a locality.

Scout Groups registered with The Scout Association are numbered according to their registration order, although not all groups follow this rule. Historically, The Scout Association reserved registration numbers for troops or Groups not attached to a church, so a Scout Group attached to a church may have been registered as 7th Gloucestershire even though it was the first formed in the location. Sometimes, Scout Groups adopted new names (for example, the 1st Whitley Scout Group became the 43rd Reading (1st Whitley) Scout Group) as District boundaries were moved and reformed. When a Scout Group is registered, a certificate of registration is issued by Scout Headquarters, confirming the group's registration name which may differ from its own name. Groups may also register as Sea Scout Groups or Air Scout Groups.

A Scout Group is led by an overseeing volunteer, whose responsibility is to ensure that the leaders of the different sections work together facilitating progress from one section to another by the young people in the group. Formerly called a Group Scout Leader (GSL), this person also ensures that the other leaders in the group take part in leader training. Scout Groups are managed by a committee, with a chairman, secretary and treasurer. They support the Group Scout Leader and the activities and events organised by the section leaders within the group. The committee is elected annually by the parents, adult leaders and representatives of the young people of the group, called the Scout Group Council.

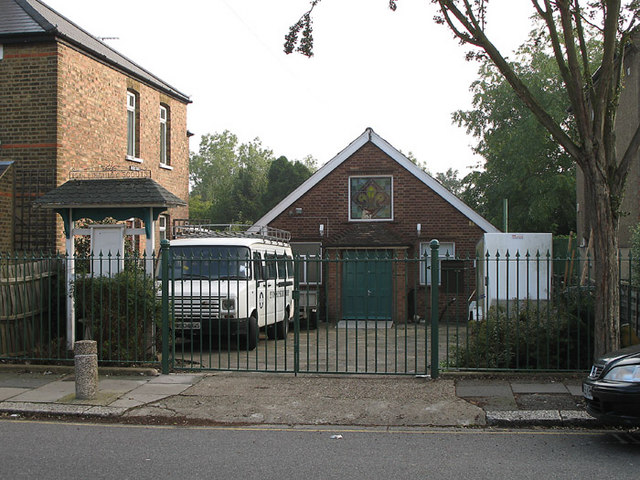
A Scout Group's headquarters building in Finchley, Greater London

Organisations such as churches, temples, schools or the YMCA can form their own Scouts and register them with The Scout Association as "sponsored scout groups", with sponsorship agreements to support certain events in exchange for the use of a building or some financial payment. Groups without this type of affiliation are described as open Scout groups. Joint Scout and Guide Groups are supported by The Scout Association and Girlguiding; in these Groups, typically Scout and Guide sections share the same meeting place, equipment, funding and committee. A Scout Group can meet in a school or church hall or may be the owners of their own Scout headquarters building.

In the Baden-Powell Scouts' Association, the situation is similar, where the Scout Group is led by a Group Scout Master (GSM). Within the B-PSA, the group is responsible for local provision through the entire age range.

== See also ==
- Scout District
