= Südtiroler Pfadfinderschaft =

German scouting association in Italy

- South Tyrolean Scout Association
- Headquarters: Bolzano
- Country: Italy
- Founded: 25 April 1973
- Membership: 600
- Chief Scout: Christian Mair (chairman); Robert Niedermair (assistant chairman); Miriam Fostini (assistant chairwoman); P. Peter Unterhofer (curate)
- Website http://www.pfadfinder.it/de/home.html

The Südtiroler Pfadfinderschaft (English: South Tyrolean Scout Association), abbreviated as SP, is the Catholic Scouting association of the German minority of the Italian province of South Tyrol. The association is coeducational and has 600 members in seven troops. It is affiliated with the Associazione Guide e Scouts Cattolici Italiani (AGESCI), is strongly connected to Pfadfinder und Pfadfinderinnen Österreichs and the Slovenian Catholic Girl Guides and Boy Scouts Association Scouting organizations, and maintains some contact with the Deutsche Pfadfinderschaft Sankt Georg. The association owns two campsites in the province.

== History ==
Scouting within the German-speaking minority grew out of Roman Catholic youth groups (Katholische Jungschar). In 1969 to 1970, Scouting became a part of the programme of these groups. A pioneer of Scouting was the priest Dean Georg Peer. He participated in seminars of the DPSG, and included Scouting in the leadership training of Jungschar afterwards. The first Scout groups affiliated to Katholische Jungschar-Südtirol were founded between 1969 and 1972. The oldest Scout group of the Südtiroler Pfadfinderschaft is in Bruneck, founded in 1969 as Jungscharscouts. In 1972, eighteen Scout leaders took part in different training courses of the DPSG. On April 25, 1973 the Südtiroler Pfadfinderschaft was established as an independent association.

In 1997, it became part of AGESCI. Scouts and Guides of the Südtiroler Pfadfinderschaft took part in the 20th World Scout Jamboree, the 21st World Scout Jamboree. and the 22nd World Scout Jamboree Scouts and Guides of the Südtiroler Pfadfinderschaft often take part in camps and training courses in other German-speaking countries (for example in 2003 in the Free Life Jamboree in Austria or in 2006 in the National Jamboree of Liechtenstein). The Südtiroler Pfadfinderschaft is member of the Deutschsprachige Konferenz der Pfadfinderverbände.

The Peace Light of Bethlehem is distributed by the association in the province of South Tyrol. Since 1991, the Peace Light of Bethlehem has been passed on to the Scout association at a ceremony in Brenner, together with Austrian Scouts and Guides from Tyrol. The distribution of the Peace Light of Bethlehem is always combined with a fundraising campaign. In 2007, it was for handicapped children in Indonesia.

The units of the association helps to maintain Tyrolean traditions such as the fires at the Feast of the Sacred Heart.

== Sections ==
- Ages 8–11: "Wölflinge" (Cub Scouts) (green scarf)
- Ages 11–14: "Jungpfadfinder" (Scouts) (blue scarf)
- Ages 14–16: "Pfadfinder" (Senior Scouts) (orange scarf)
- Ages 16 and older: "Rover" (Rover Scouts) (brown scarf)
- At the age of 18 it is possible to participate in a training course to become an assistant leader. (brown scarf)
- To become a full leader you have to participate another training course, which is usually organized by the Pfadfinder und Pfadfinderinnen Österreichs. Usually 1 or 2 full leaders and 2 or 3 assistants lead one group. This full leaders wear a brown scarf with a yellow edge.
- Adults over 30, who don't have a leader-position can be part of the "Gilde", which is meeting only a few times in the year.

== Other Scouting units in South Tyrol ==
There are units of AGESCI and Corpo Nazionale Giovani Esploratori ed Esploratrici Italiani, especially in the cities of Bolzano and Meran. The Movimento Adulti Scout Cattolici Italiani serves adult Scouts in Bolzano and Meran. The Scout Group Merano 3 is affiliated to Associazione Italiana Guide e Scouts d'Europa Cattolici della FSE.
