= Associazione Guide Esploratori Cattolici Sammarinesi =

National Scouting and Guiding association of San Marino

- Sanmarinese Catholic Guide and Scout Association
- Country: San Marino
- Founded: 1989
- Membership: 270
- Affiliation: World Association of Girl Guides and Girl Scouts, World Organization of the Scout Movement
- Website www.agecs.org

The Associazione Guide Esploratori Cattolici Sammarinesi (Sanmarinese Catholic Guide and Scout Association, AGECS) is a Catholic Scouting and Guiding association in San Marino, with 300 members. Scouting and Guiding in San Marino started within the respective Italian organisations, the Associazione Scouts Cattolici Italiani (ASCI) and the Associazione Guide Italiane (AGI), which were merged into the Associazione Guide e Scouts Cattolici Italiani (AGESCI) in 1974. The AGECS splintered from the AGESCI and became independent in 1992. However, the two associations have a pact of cooperation. The AGECS became a member of the World Organization of the Scout Movement in 1990 and an associate member of the World Association of Girl Guides and Girl Scouts in 1992.

AGECS' Scout emblem incorporates the color scheme of the flag of San Marino.

== Scout oath ==
In Italian: Con l'aiuto di Dio, prometto sul mio Onore di fare del mio meglio per compiere il mio dovere verso Dio e verso il mio paese, per aiutare gli altri in ogni circostanza, per osservare la Legge Scout.

In English: With God's help, I promise on my honour to do my best, to do my duty to God and my country, to help others in every circumstance and to observe the Scout Law.

== Scout law ==
La guida e lo Scout:
The Guide and the Scout:

- pongono il loro onore nel meritare fiducia
  put their honor in being trusted
- sono leali
  are loyal
- si rendono utili ed aiutano gli altri
  make themselves useful and help others
- sono amici di tutti e Fratelli di ogni altra Guida e Scout
  are friends to all and brothers to all other Guides and Scouts
- sono cortesi
  are courteous
- amano e rispettano la natura
  love and respect nature
- sanno obbedire
  know to obey
- sorridono e cantano anche nelle difficolta
  smile and sing even under difficult conditions
- sono laboriousi ed economi
  are hard working and thrifty
- sono puri di pensieri, parole ed azioni
  are pure in thought, word and deeds
