= DSK =

DSK may refer to:

- Dera Ismail Khan Airport (IATA code)
- German International School Cape Town (Deutsche Internationale Schule Kapstadt)
- Deutsche Schule Kiew
- Deutsche Schule Kobe/European School
- Deutschsprachige Konferenz der Pfadfinderverbände
- Division Schnelle Kräfte, the German Armed Forces Rapid Forces Division
- DoD Secure Kiosk, a device used by the United States Air Force
- Dominique Strauss-Kahn (born 1949), French economist and politician
- Downstream key—see Keying (graphics)
- Dvorak Simplified Keyboard, alternative to the QWERTY keyboard layout
- DSK Bank, Bulgarian bank
- DSP Starter Kit, supplied by Texas Instruments
