= Mario Sica =

Italian diplomat and scout

International Commissioner of the Italian Scout Federation

Mario Sica (born December 4, 1936) is an Italian retired diplomat and served as the International Commissioner of the Italian Scout Federation. He was born in Rome. Sica edited the Italian editions of the works of Robert Baden-Powell and wrote, among other things, the History of Scouting in Italy.

Sica joined Scouting in Florence in 1947, and was head of a Scout unit and Scout group in Florence between 1956 and 1960. He collaborated on translating international works, first for Associazione Scouts Cattolici Italiani and later for its successor, Associazione Guide e Scouts Cattolici Italiani.

== Biography ==
When the Scout movement was reborn in Italy after the fascist suppression, there was a need to provide material to raise awareness of Scouting, therefore Sica oversaw the Italian editions of the works of Robert Baden-Powell, often translating them in his own hand.

His diplomatic career, allowing him to travel the world, put him in touch with the realities of Scouts from other countries, which he brought back to Italy. In 1978, he founded the "Baden-Powell" Scout Group in Bern, using the Italian language and AGESCI methodology, for children of Italian immigrants. In the preface to Footsteps of the Founder, László Nagy, the Secretary General of the World Organization of the Scout Movement wrote that the works of Baden-Powell are read in Italian in his own country, rather than English, thanks to the work of Sica.

Sica was serving as Italian ambassador to Somalia when the government of Siad Barre fell during the Somali Civil War in 1991. As ambassador, he helped facilitate the extraction of a joint North and South Korean diplomatic delegation that had been stranded by the fighting in Mogadishu.

In 1988, Sica was awarded the 193rd Bronze Wolf, the only distinction of the World Organization of the Scout Movement, awarded by the World Scout Committee for exceptional services to world Scouting.

== Works ==
He has written numerous books on the history and traditions of Scouting.

- Mario Sica, Marigold non fiorì. Il contributo italiano alla pace in Vietnam, Firenze, Ponte alle Grazie, 1991.
- Mario Sica, Operazione Somalia, Marsilio, Venezia, 1994.
- Mario Sica, La Pira e la ricerca della pace in Vietnam, Il Politico, anno LXIX, n° 3, 2004.
- Mario Sica, Matrimonio di sangue, Polistampa, Firenze, 2007.
- Mario Sica, L'Italia e la pace in Vietnam (1965–68). Operazione Marigold", Roma, 2013

=== Scout ===
- Cerimonie scout
- Footsteps of the Founder (in Italia uscito come Giocare il Gioco), 1982, for the 75th anniversary of the Scout Movement
- Giochi sportivi
- Grandi Giochi per esploratori e guide
- Grandi Giochi per lupetti e coccinelle
- Qui comincia l'avventura scout
- Storia dello scautismo in Italia History of Scouting in Italy
- Gli Scout
