= Zanolini =

Zanolini is an Italian surname. Notable people with the surname include:

- Danilo Zanolini (born 1980), Brazilian kickboxer
- Gualtiero Zanolini, member of the World Scout Committee
- Paul Zanolini (1898–1989), American sport wrestler
- Umberto Zanolini (1887–1973), Italian gymnast
