= Scouting and Guiding in Austria =

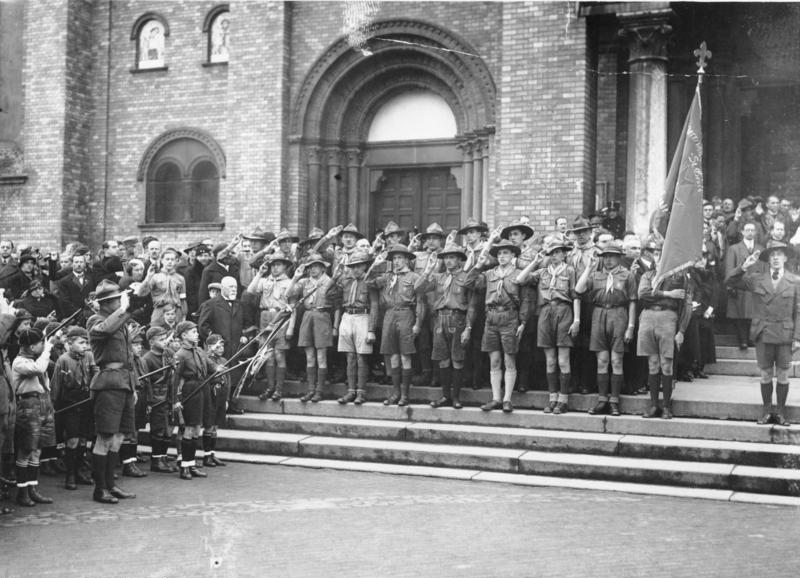
Scouts in Austria in 1920

Scouting in Austria is served by multiple Scout associations and was first established in 1909 in Austria-Hungary.

== Background ==
Austria is served by multiple Scout associations, among them

Organizational flows of Austrian Scouting (1910–2026)

- Pfadfinder und Pfadfinderinnen Österreichs, member of World Organization of the Scout Movement and WAGGGS, member of the Austrian National Youth Council
- Österreichischer Pfadfinderbund, 3000 members, founded 1914/reorganized 1949, member of the Austrian National Youth Council
- Pfadfinder-Gilde Österreichs, founder member of the International Scout and Guide Fellowship, founded in 1951, 3000 members
- Katholische Pfadfinderschaft Europas-Österreich (Catholic Scouts of Europe), affiliated to Union Internationale des Guides et Scouts d'Europe, founded in 1981
- Royal Rangers Austria, affiliated to Royal Rangers International, founded 1985
- Adventwacht, affiliated to Pathfinders International
- Hashomer Hatzair, member of the Austrian National Youth Council
- Muslimische Pfadfinderinnen und Pfadfinder Österreich (Islamic), founded in 2004
- Pfadfinder der Kirche Jesu Christi der Heiligen der Letzten Tage, is an organization of the Church of Jesus Christ of Latter-day Saints, founded in 1974
- Europa Scouts, founded 1949
- Pfadfinderinnen und Pfadfinder Europas-Österreich, founded 2000
- Scouts of Europa - Europäische Pfadfinderbewegung, Prospect Member of the World Federation of Independent Scouts, founded 2006

== International Scout and Guide units in Austria ==
- Boy Scouts of America, served by the Transatlantic Council
- Girlguiding UK, served by British Guides in Foreign Countries
- Girl Scouts of the USA, served by USAGSO headquarters
- Scouts et Guides de France operates one group in Vienna.
- Hungarian Scouting, served by Külföldi Magyar Cserkészszövetség - Hungarian Scout Association in Exteris
- Homenetmen has one chapter in Vienna, founded in 1985

== See also ==
- Rudolf Carl von Slatin, early promoter and supporter of Scouting in Austria and Honorary Chief Scout
- Scouting in displaced persons camps
