= PPÖ =

PPÖ may refer to:

- Pfadfinder und Pfadfinderinnen Österreichs (Boy Scouts and Girl Guides of Austria, PPÖ), is the largest Scouting and Guiding organization in Austria
- Pirate Party of Austria (Piratenpartei Österreichs, formerly using the abbreviation PPÖ), is the Austrian Pirate Party section
