= Peace Scouts =

Peace Scouts may refer to:

- Peace Scouts, the original name for GirlGuiding New Zealand
- Peace Scouts of California, an early group engaged in Scouting in the United States
- National Peace Scouts, also known as British Boy Scouts and British Girl Scouts Association
- Peace Boy Scouts, another name for Ragazzi Esploratori Italiani, an early group engaged in Scouting and Guiding in Italy
