= James Richardson Spensley =

English footballer and manager, scouting pioneer

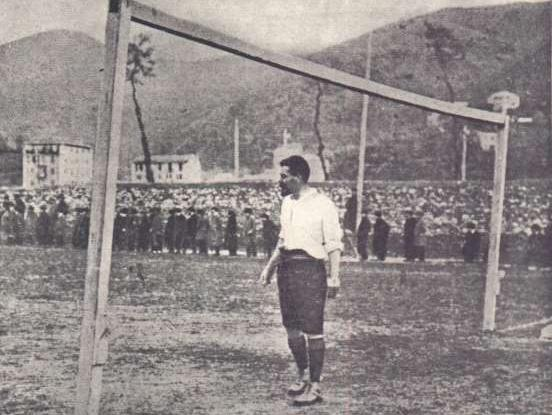

Personal information
- Full name: James Richardson Spensley
- Date of birth: 17 May 1867
- Place of birth: Stoke Newington, London, UK
- Date of death: 10 November 1915 (aged 48)
- Place of death: Mainz, Rhine Province, German Empire
- Positions: Goalkeeper; defender

Senior career*
Years	Team	Apps	(Gls)
1896–1906	Genoa	22	(0)

Managerial career
- 1896–1907: Genoa
- * Club domestic league appearances and goals

James Richardson Spensley (17 May 1867 – 10 November 1915) was an English medical doctor, footballer, manager, scout leader and medic from Stoke Newington, London. He is considered to be one of the "Fathers of Italian football", due to his association with Genoa CFC and his contribution to the modern day variation of the game in Italy and of Italian scouting.

== Biography ==
He was born in 1867 in the Stoke Newington district of London to William Spensley and Elizabeth Alice Richardson. Although he was born and grew up in London, the Spensley family were originally from the Swaledale area in Yorkshire.

Richardson Spensley had the opportunity to travel far and wide as an adult. Amongst the most keen interests which he had acquired whilst travelling were eastern religions, languages (he was versed in Greek and Sanskrit), boxing and football. In addition to working as a doctor, he spent some time as a correspondent for the British newspaper the Daily Mail. He joined the Theosophical Society in August 1901.

=== Football in Genoa ===
Richardson Spensley arrived in Genoa in 1896, initially for the purpose of curing English sailors on the coal ships. He joined Genoa Cricket & Athletics Club, a cricket and athletics club formed by British expatriates. He opened the footballing section of the club on 10 April 1897 and was put in place as its first ever manager. This was innovative as the modern day footballing scene in Italy was in its embryonic stages: if it had not been for Edoardo Bosio who founded four clubs in Turin, there would have been no football at all in Italy at the time of Richardson Spensley's arrival.

Richardson Spensley acted as player-manager for Genoa in the first ever Italian Football Championship (which he initiated) during 1898 which his club won. The following season, he switched position from defender to goalkeeper, playing on until 1906.

Including the first title, Genoa won the Italian league six times while Richardson Spensley was at the helm. After retiring from playing when he was almost 40 years old, he stayed on in the management role for one more year, before leaving entirely.

=== Scouting ===
While living in England he became acquainted with Robert Baden-Powell who founded the Scout Movement, from whom he had received a signed copy of Scouting for Boys. In 1910 genoan pedagogist Mario Mazza, who had founded in 1905 a youth movement called Le gioiose, decided to join scouting with his group. He approached Sir Francis Vane, another Briton living in Italy and former collaborator of Baden-Powell, who had founded the first Italian scout troop in Bagni di Lucca in 1908. Vane came to Genoa to hold a lecture, and referred Mazza to Spensley. Spensley and Mazza together founded the first scout troops in Genoa and joined the newly born association Ragazzi Esploratori Italiani (REI), the first scout association in Italy. Mazza was Section Secretary and Spensley regional commissioner for Liguria. The Genoa section was one of the most active in the early years of scouting in Italy, and Mazza and Spensley are counted amongst the pioneers of Italian scouting.

=== Death ===
During World War I, he worked in the medical field putting his scouting abilities to use as a lieutenant in the Royal Army Medical Corps. He was injured on the battle field while tending to the wounds of an enemy out of compassion. As an officer, he was interned in the Fortress of Mainz, in Germany, where he died of his wounds not long after.

His body was one of many moved in 1922 from smaller graveyards to larger cemeteries in Germany (no British bodies were returned to Britain). Spensley was reburied at Niederzwehren War Cemetery south of Kassel. His final burial location remained unknown until 1993, when two Italian scouts, after long research, managed to locate it again.

== Honours ==
- 1898 Italian Football Championship (Genoa)
- 1899 Italian Football Championship (Genoa)
- 1900 Italian Football Championship (Genoa)
- 1902 Italian Football Championship (Genoa)
- 1903 Italian Football Championship (Genoa)
- 1904 Italian Football Championship (Genoa)

== Bibliography ==
- Alberto dal Porto, Sir Francis Patrick Fletcher-Vane, Padova, AGESCI Comitato Regionale Veneto - Centro Studi e Documentazione, 2010.
- (in Italian) Cronaca rievocativa a ricordo ed onore del Prof. Carlo Colombo fondatore del C.N.G.E.I. nel cinquantenario della sua morte 1918-1968, a cura di Antonio Viezzoli, suppl. a «Il Sentiero», 10 (1968), 3.
- Sica, Mario (2002). Gli scout. Storia di una grande avventura iniziata con 22 ragazzi su un'isola (in Italian). Bologna: Società editrice il Mulino. ISBN 978-88-15-08477-4.
- Sica, Mario (2006). Storia dello scautismo in Italia (in Italian) (4th ed.). Roma: Edizioni scout fiordaliso. ISBN 978-88-8054-774-7.
- Furia, Mauro (1991). "Come nacquero i R.E.I. Ragazzi Esploratori Italiani". Esperienze & Progetti n. 85, Maggio-Giugno 1991 (in Italian). Bologna: Centro Studi Scout Baden-Powell.
- Rota, Davide (2008). Dizionario illustrato dei giocatori genoani (in Italian). Genova: De Ferrari. ISBN 978-88-6405-011-9.
- Padovano, Aldo (2005). Accadde domani... un anno con il Genoa (in Italian). Genova: De Ferrari. ISBN 88-7172-689-8.
- Tomati, Franco; Brera, Gianni (1992). Genoa Amore mio (in Italian). Nuove Edizioni Periodiche.
- L'età dei pionieri (in Italian). Genova: Fondazione Genoa 1893. 2008.
