= Niederzwehren =

Coordinates: 51°17′N 9°28′E

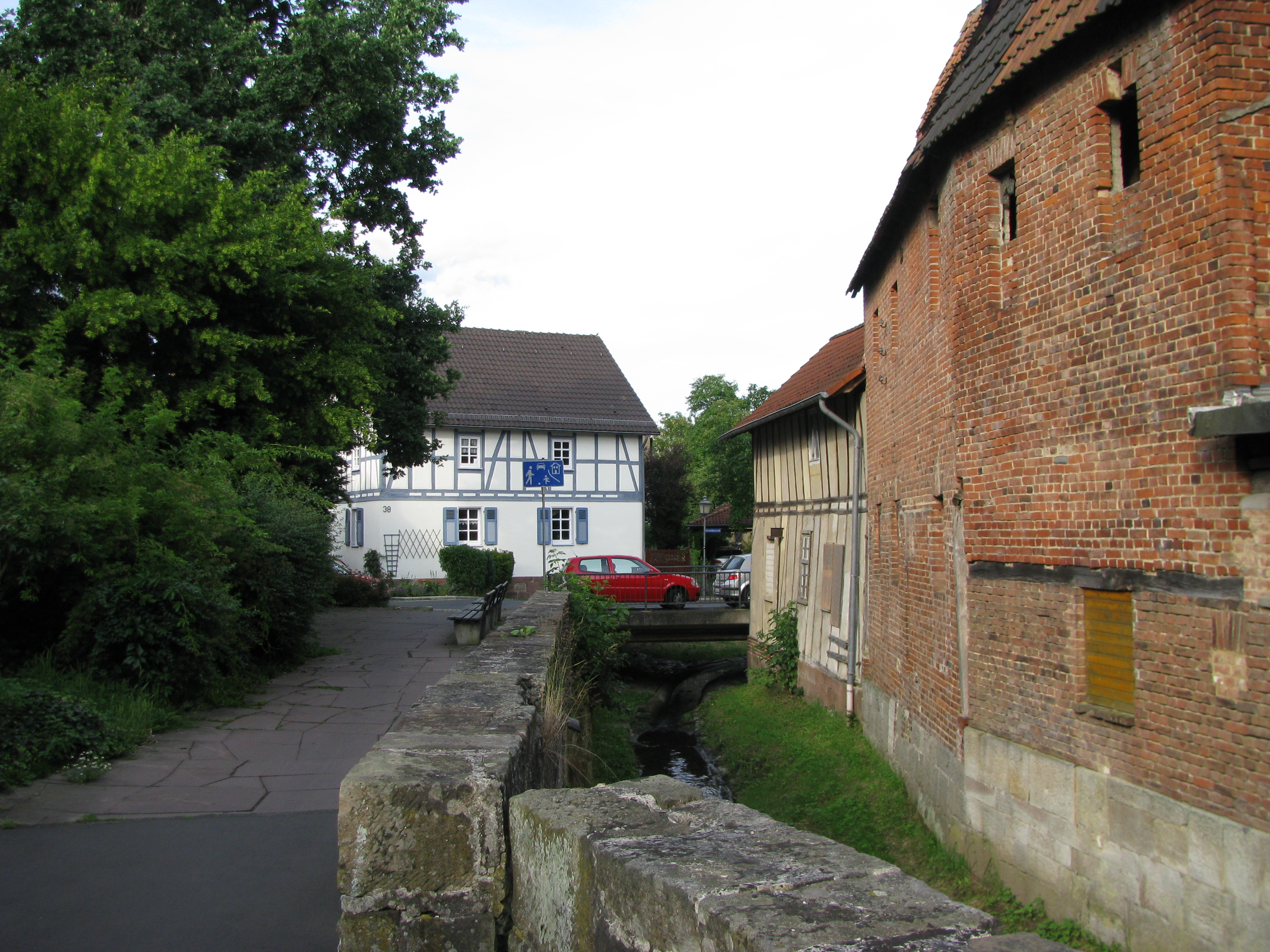
Niederzwehren

Niederzwehren is a small town in Germany, part of the city of Kassel, Hesse. It is notable for its First World War prisoner-of-war camp and a consequent sizable war cemetery for the British prisoners who died in captivity.

== Town ==
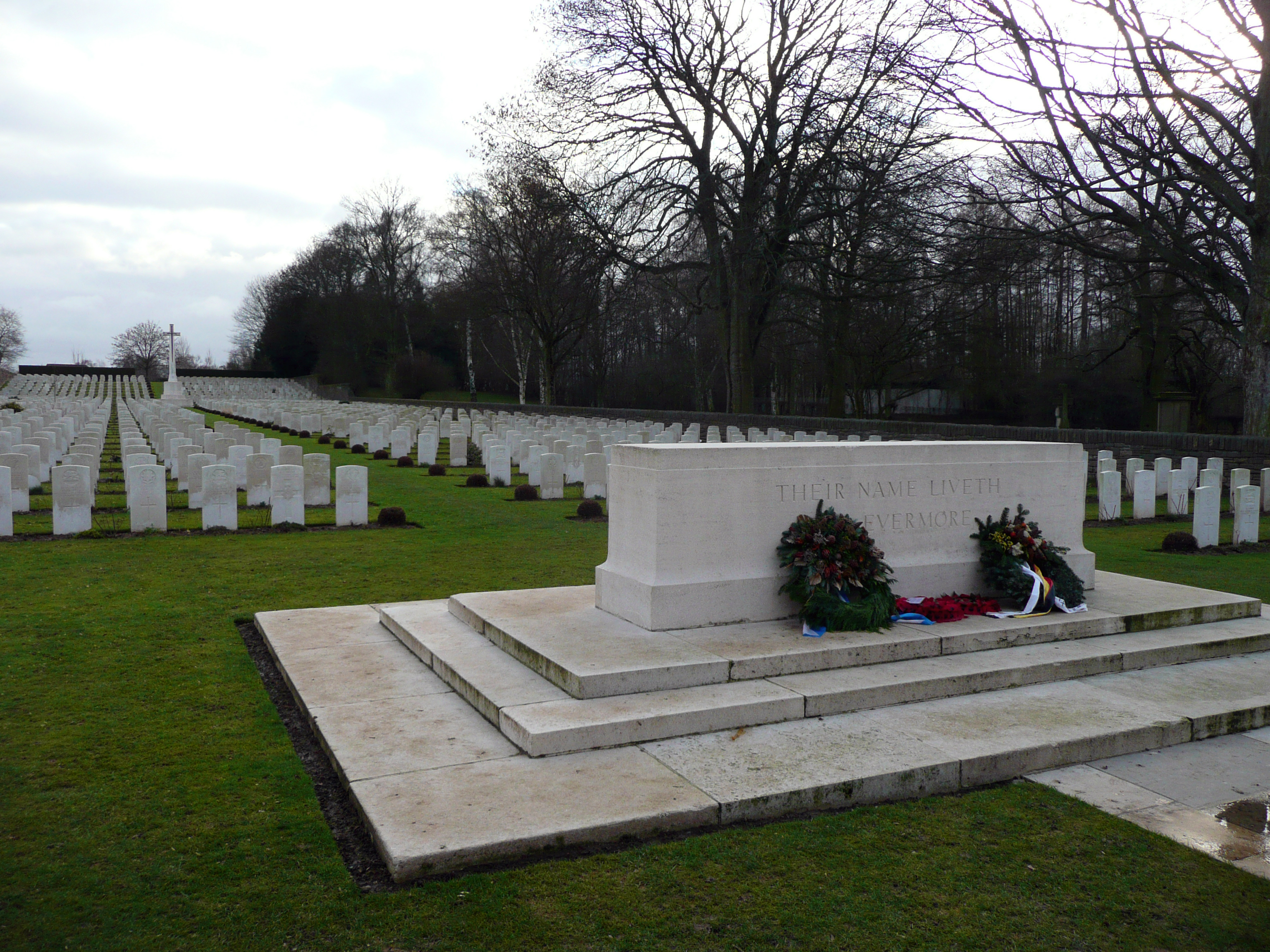
Niederzwehren Commonwealth Cemetery

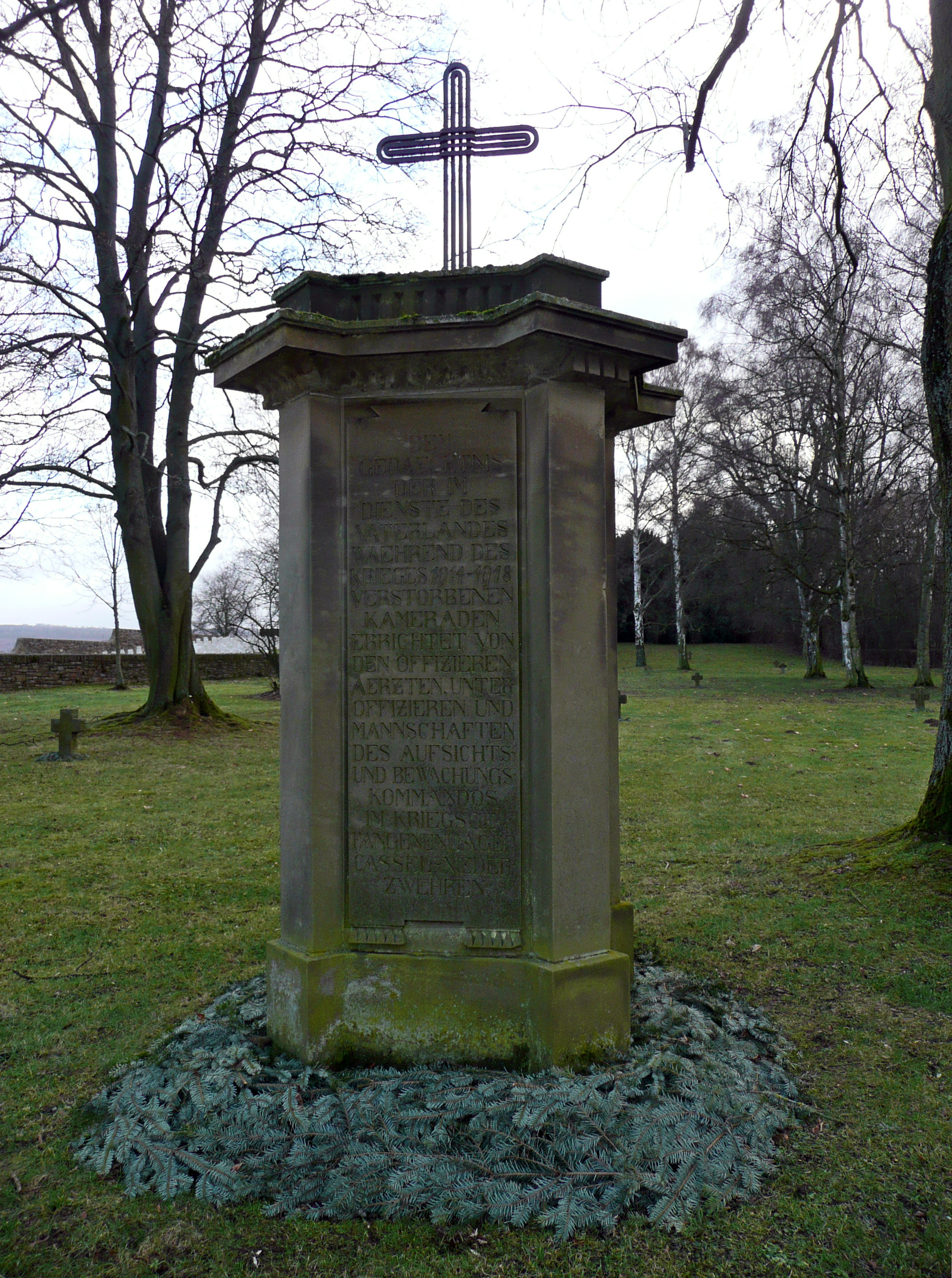
The memorial to dead German guards at Niederzwehren

The town lies between Kassel city centre and Oberzwehren. The town, literally Lower Zwehren, links to Oberzwehren, Upper Zwehren, with the overall area of Zwehren or Tweren appearing in documents from as early as 1074. It was several times destroyed by fire, including during the Thirty Years War.

In the 19th century it was home to the 18th (Thuringian) Foot Artillery, who had a barracks on the edge of the town.

In 1936 the village officially came under the jurisdiction of Kassel.

Famous residents include storyteller Dorothea Viehmann, politician Elisabeth Selbert and brewer Frederick Krug.

== Camp ==
The camp was begun around December 1914 and held British and French prisoners captured on the western front. Early in 1915 Russian prisoners from the eastern front also arrived with numbers peaking at around 20,000. The German staff controlling this number probably totalled around 150 men.

The camp operated beyond the armistice of November 1918 and was only finally closed in the summer of 1919.

== Niederzwehren War Cemetery ==
The cemetery was begun early in 1915 specifically to bury prisoners-of-war. Prisoners were mainly British and French from the western front, but also included some Russian prisoners. By 1919 it contained over 3000 graves, but numbers were reduced mainly due to the French practice of repatriating French victims. The cemetery was formalised by British authorities in 1922 to a design by Sir Robert Lorimer. This included bringing dead prisoners from at least a dozen other smaller camps around Germany as a consolidation exercise. The ground is officially British soil, owned by the British crown.

The graveyard currently holds 1795 Commonwealth graves from the First World War, largely those who died of wounds following capture, or from disease within the camp. Notable graves include:

- Julian Royds Gribble VC grave III.F.4
- James Richardson Spensley grave III.H.5

The adjacent Russian War Cemetery contains around 2000 but these are not individually marked and are simply remembered by a Russian cross.

The Russian cemetery (to one side) contains a relatively rare monument: remembering the 38 guards who died during their duties (mainly during the Spanish flu epidemic of 1918).
