= Österreichischer Pfadfinderbund =

2nd largest Austrian Scouting and Guiding organization

Österreichischer Pfadfinderbund (ÖPB)
- Headquarters: Vienna, Austria
- Location: Austria
- Country: Austria
- Founded: 1950; 76 years ago (split from Pfadfinder und Pfadfinderinnen Österreichs after merging in 1945; originally founded in 1912)
- Founder: Emmerich Teuber
- Membership: 3000
- Bundesfeldmeister: Gerhard Spitzer
- Governing body: Bundesvorstand
- Website www.pfadfinderbund.at

Österreichischer Pfadfinderbund (ÖPB) is the second largest Scouting association in Austria after the Pfadfinder und Pfadfinderinnen Österreichs (PPO). It split from PPÖ in 1950 after merging in 1945 after the Second World War because of the perceived closeness to the Catholic Church. Today, it has approximately 3,000 members and operates primarily in Vienna, Lower Austria, and Carinthia, as well as in Upper Austria and Salzburg. This interdenominational association is a member of the Austrian National Youth Council. The ÖPB is co-educational.

The ÖPB's training center is located in Höflein an der Donau. Its headquarters are in Vienna.

== Background ==
The ÖPB that merged in 1945 was founded in 1912. Letters sent from officials from both organizations suggest a deep disdain and personal differences may be the real reason of the split.

In 1995 ÖPB and PPÖ signed a cooperation agreement that allows members of the ÖPB to participate in the leader training programme and Wood Badge course of PPÖ and participate at the World Scout Jamboree as part of the PPÖ delegation.

== Age groups ==
- Wölflinge (6–11 years old)
- Pfadfinder(innen) (11–16 years old)
- Rover (16–25 years old)
- Gilden (over 25 years old)

== See also ==
- Scouting and Guiding in Germany
- Scouting and Guiding in Austria
