= ASTAR Scrabble Challenge International =

Scrabble tournament held in Malaysia

The ASTAR Scrabble Challenge International (ASCI), is an annual international Scrabble tournament held by ASTAR, Universiti Malaya, Malaysia.

Founded in 2006, it's an event that brings together Scrabble players from around the world.

== Introduction ==
Since its inception, ASCI had become one of the main Scrabble tournament in the region. This is also one of the warm-up tournament to the Malaysia National Youth Scrabble Championship (NYSC) held in Q2/Q3 each year.

ASTAR Scrabble Challenge International (ASCI) was first organised in the year of 2006 by First Residential College, University of Malaya. Since then, ASCI has been held every year, with a steady growth in the number of participants and fame in the world of Scrabble. It has become one of the world's largest international Collins event.

In 2025, more than 200 players from 8 countries, including GOAT Nigel Richards, joined the tournament. This is also the first year where top 20 placings for each category were given medals in recognition of their achievements.

== Past winners (Open) ==
Year / Placing	1	2	3	4	5	6	7	8	9	10
2025	Nigel Richards	Hubert Wee Ming Hui	Ryan Wee	Thacha Koowirat	Napat Vatjaranurathorn	Chollapat Itthiaree	William Kang	Tan Jin Chor	Law Long Yin Thomson	Toh Weibin
2024	Hubert Wee Ming Hui	Vannitha Balasingam	Nigel Richards	Thacha Koowirat	Napat Vatjaranurathorn	Nuti Suri	Alex Tan Ken Seng	Euclid Hui	Ricky Purnomo	Yong Jian Rong
2023	Nigel Richards	Thacha Koowirat	Thomson Law Long Yin	William Kang	Napat Vatjaranurathorn	Chollapat Itthiaree	Alex Tan Ken Seng	Nattapat Nak-in	Vannitha Balasingam	Jocelyn Lor
2022	Thacha Koowirat	Wee Ming Hui Hubert	Kong Chock Heng	Hui Yau Tang Euclid	Jimmy	Songkran Jantasen	Mehul Arora	Heriyanto	Muhammad Dani Andhika Pangestu	Tsang Tsz Ming
2021	Wee Ming Hui Hubert	Thacha Koowirat	Mohammad Bin Abdul G. Suma	Kong Chock Heng	Jimmy	Alex Tan Ken Seng	Lear Jet E. De la Cruz	Risdiyanto	Viki Nadi	Diah Rini Melati
2019	Nigel Richards	Thacha Koowirat	Vannitha Balasingam	Marlon Prudencio	Jocelyn Lor	Yong Jian Rong	Jakkrit Klaphajone	Tony Sim	Kong Chock Heng	Mohd Ali Ismail
2018	Nigel Richards	Tony Sim	Thacha Koowirat	Jakkrit Klaphajone	Akkarapol Kwansak	Chang Ching Wei	William Kang	Goutham Jayaraman	Kong Chock Heng	Marlon Prudencio
2017	Nigel Richards	Pichai Limprasert	Sim Tony	Thacha Koowirat	Jeremy Khoo	Marlon Prudencio	Goutham Jayaraman	William Kang	Pui Cheng Wui	Adam Bin Azlan
2016	Goutham Jayaraman	Toh Weibin	Michael Tang	Alex Tan Ken Seng	Nigel Richards	Jakkrit Klaphajone	Hubert Wee Ming Hui	Muhd Adham Abdullah	Vinnith Ramamurti	Yeo Kian Hung
2015	Nigel Richards	Tony Sim	Hubert Wee	Yeo Kien Hung	Gabriel Cheang	-	-	-	-	-
2014	Nigel Richards	Yeo Kien Hung	Tan Jin Chor	Alex Tan Ken Seng	Tony Sim	Jocelyn Lor	Albert Martono	Michael Tang	Yeap Gim Sai	Seshi Ramanathan

== Past winners (U18) ==
Year / Placing	1	2	3	4	5	6	7	8	9	10
2025	Lord Garnett Talisic	Cyril Xavier Hong	Wong Tsz Sen	Aghalya Nageshvaran	Liem Wing Ho	Ariana Onyinyechukwu	Vyasa Dhesa Nithyann	Aidan Nathaniel Ho	Dresden Lim Zhan Le	Kang Cheuk
2024	Ahmad Aqmarul Harraz	Ali Imran	Teh Yu Ken	Avinesh Jayaganes	Leong Wai Chun	Siramol Saechao	Wan Elham Shakee	Jane Kang Yi Jin	Natnaree Sanubol	Fitrah Amani
2023	Ahmad Aqmarul Harraz	Eirfan Bin Razman	Chaiyottha Manachai	Sakdipong Lor-Udomph	Lou Yuen Ching	Teh Yu Ken	Jane Kang Yi Jin	Asher Foo Mow Xin	Navish Lakhwani	Kreesan Bathmanaban
2022	Napat Vatjaranurathorn	Prayoga Affandi	Nattapat Nak-In	Law Long Yin Thomson	Navish Ramash Lakhwani	Eirfan Bin Razman	Candra Irawan	Imode Omoye Divine	Kavindu Chethana Malawaraarachchi	Tsoi Yin Ian
2021	Napat Vatjaranurathorn	Tarin Pairor	Tan Zi Kang	Nattapat	Gao Xinyue	Law Long Yin Thomson	David Raynard Gunadi	Manat Panmanee	Praphasri Niruttikun	Shayne L.Maratas
2019	Tarin Pairor	Po Chun Wo	Yalleni Gunenthiran	Amerenthiran Anantha	Khor Jia Wayn	Muhd Nur Akbar Nedi	Yang Hanming Darry	Manat Panmanee	Erlangga Jati D	Muhammad Rofi
2018	Yoga Adi Pratama	Khor Jia Wynn	Ahmad Kashful	Muhd Amirul	Susan Tandiono	Khor Jia Wayn	Nicholas Tanoto	Edeline Clarissa	Bintang Ramadhan	King Soon Kit
2017	Leon Tan Zheng Han	Hathaiphat Suphattharathorn	Tawanjames Barwell	Tinash A/L Rawin Drak	Mohamed Aabid Ismail	Bobby Malela Hutagalung	Aditya Kuntjoro Adjie	Muhd Amirul Hakeem B Md Saharudin	Jonathan Aidan Royan	Nithiyassri A/P K.R.T Vivagandan
2016	Yong Jian Rong	Leon Tan Zheng Han	Azhamirul Bin Warno	Sridaran Ramiah	Muhd Furqon	Muhd Ridhwan M Nasir	Tan Xin Wei	Agil Firmansyah	Hemalatha Palani	Rashwen Sundraraj

== Past winners (U15) ==
Year / Placing	1	2	3	4	5	6	7	8	9	10
2025	Josiah Leon Rapha	Thanik Leephatravo	Nathathai Chaowalit	Mehaan Sughatharam	Thaksaphorn Pratheep	Wong Sze Lang Ella	Arief Ahmad Hafiz	Fok Pak Hei	Meira Murugaiah	Dericka Lim Jing You
2024	Dresden Lim Zhan Le	Alexa Koh Qiien	Wong Sze Lang Ella	Guo Ching Wang	Lim Eu Jie	Joseph Leung Chunei	Aidan Nathaniel Ho	Shanthoosh Prathaban	Yashica Tinakaran	Liem Wing Ho
2023	Lord Garnett Talisic	Ariana Onyinyechukwu	Andrea Tan Kai Xuan	Alexis Koh Qiian	Ariel Wong Zi Rong	Dresden Lim Zhan Le	Vyasa Dheva Nithyana	Avinesh Jayaganes	Shanthoosh Prathaban	Ashraff Ahmad Hafiz
2022	Muhammad Afif Akbar	Tan Yu Ming	Sanuthi Nimrada Chandrakumar	Delbert Tiong Guo-Yi	Ahmad Aqmarul Harraz	Fitrah Amani Bt Mohd Khairul Akmal	Archana Padumadasa	Dresden Lim Zhan Le	Alexis Koh Qiian	Siddartha Mariappan
2021	Nishanya Nimthakie Gammanpila	Muhammad Ali	Shane Abbas	Ali Imran Bin Hisham Talib	Avinesh Jayaganes	Archana Padumadasa	Kavindu Chethana Malawaraarachchi	Affan Salman	Akeel Rilas	Kesavan Sivabalan
2019	Napat Vatjaranurathorn	Thomson Law Long Yin	Napat Narinsuksanti	Tengku Ariff Shah	Aadhi Shankara Nithyanandan	Egy Vedriyanto	Julian Wong Tsz Yu	Muhammad Dhia Zafri	Nishant Rajah	Kreesan Bathmanaban
2018	Napat Vatjaranurathorn	Thomson Long Yin Law	Nattapat Nak-In	Manat Panmanee	Egy Vedriyanto	Hobert Kangdrew	Ahmad Hazim	Dzarif Izzat Muis Alim	Tengku Ariff Shah	Jareth Mah Zhen Seong
2017	Ginige Janul Vinura De Silva	Supakrit Saetao	Nattapat Nak-In	Qays Abdul Latheef Riyaz Mohamed Sangani	Pansub Direkwatana	Khor Jia Wayn	Marcus Wang Zhe Qi	Iman Amani Azmi	Ahmad Hazim Bin Azlan	Marco
2016	Aabid Ismail	Muhd_Ariff Jazlan	Khor Jia Wayn	Tito Mahmudi	Supakrit Saetao	Pansub Direkwatana	Ahmad Kashful Akmal	Keeran Bathmanaban	Erlangga Jati Dewant	Adam Harith Zainal

== Past winners (U12) ==
Year / Placing	1	2	3	4	5	6	7	8	9	10
2025	Nathan Tan Rui Ern	Chayutt Khajornpwthn	Kulachat Khajornpwth	Yap Lewis	Ong Mo Bin	Zahra Zharfan	Chong Enhao	Alanna Marissa	Zahra Sofea	Adiba Khansa
2024	Nathan Tan Rui Ern	Arief Ahmad Hafiz	Dericka Lim Jing You	Harith Aqil	Kridlabhon Sunson	Nathathai Chaowalit	Thaksaphorn Pratheep	Amelia Goh Hui Neo	Noelle Chou Kit Yue	Alexa Koh Qiien
2023	Lim Eu Jie	Dericka Lim Jing You	Nathan Tan Rui Ern	Arief Ahmad Hafiz	Rohit Kanna	Meiira Murugaiah	Nur Sarah Yasmin	Kyan Tan Hao Ken	Harith Aqil	Mehaan Sughatharam
2022	Revalina Oktavia Mezana	Rohan Schaffer A/L Selvakumar Samuel	Jaishnavi Jayaganes	Aulia Harfasela	Nathan Tan Rui Ern	Muhammad Zahid Bin Rosman	Dericka Lim Jing You	Aghalya Nageshvaran	Levia Sumitra A/P Prasannan	Nur Maryam Mir Bt Akashah
2021	Dresden Lim Zhan Le	Muhammad Afif Akbar	Jyotsnaa Kumarendran	Siddartha Mariappan	Nattachai Anuponvorakit	Lily Lau Yi En	Jaishnavi Jayaganes	Alexis Koh Qiian	Patrick Heng Bing Xi	Koh Ying Jay
2019	Ariana Onyinyechukwu Daniel	Ahmad Aqmarul Harraz Bin Azhan	Lord Garnett Talisic	Anna Natasha	Muhd Farid Irfan	Nurin Fazila	Naufal Nan Mahadhir	Ali Imran Bin Hisham Talib	K.Laksanapreecha	Titus Anand
2018	Eirfan Bin Razman	Pranut Angsakul	Laksanapreecha	Napat Narinsuksanti	Kyan Teo	Nurin Farisha	Alisha M.	Kreesan Bathmanaban	Muhammad Aiman	Siridech
2017	Tangcharoen Wapol	Napat Narinsuksanti	Angsakul Pranut	Aadhi Shankara Nithyanandan	Muhammad Faiq Haikal Bin M.Haikal	Abu Hazeeq Fiqri Bin Abu Haniffah	Muhammad Al-Syahmi Bin Mohd Taha	Eirfan Bin Razman	Jareth Mah Zhen Seong	Angsakul Nuttawat
2016	Tengku Ariff Shah	Nutchanon Iemsungnoe	Paparavee Direkwatan	John Yeap Teik Jien	Wapol Tangcharoean	Tanish Rajah	K. Kubeshavarsha	Balqis Badrul Hisham	Mohd Hazman Yuzairi	Dzarif Izzat Muis Alim
