= Italian Scout Federation =

Italian Federation for Scouting

- Italian: Federazione Italiana dello Scautismo
- Headquarters: piazza Pasquale Paoli, 18
- Location: Rome
- Country: Italy
- Founded: 1986
- Membership: 187,000
- President: Franz Adami
- Vice-president: Marilina Laforgia
- Affiliation: World Association of Girl Guides and Girl Scouts, World Organization of the Scout Movement
- Website www.scouteguide.it
- Standard uniform colors for Italian Scouts federation

The Italian Scout Federation (FIS, Federazione Italiana dello Scautismo) is the national Scouting and Guiding federation of Italy. Scouting and Guiding in Italy started in 1910, the Boy Scouts were among the charter members of the World Organization of the Scout Movement in 1922, the Girl Guides joined the World Association of Girl Guides and Girl Scouts in 1948. The federation serves 102,778 Scouts (as of 2011) and 84,303 Guides (as of 2008).

== History ==
The FIS was founded in 1986 after the merger of Federazione Esploratori Italiani (Boy Scouts branch, established in 1944 and WOSM affiliated) and Federazione Italiana Guide Esploratrici (Girl Guides branch, established in 1945 and WAGGGS affiliated).

== Members ==
The members of the federation are

- Associazione Guide e Scouts Cattolici Italiani (AGESCI, Italian Catholic Guide and Scout Association, Catholic, coed)
- Corpo Nazionale Giovani Esploratori ed Esploratrici Italiani (CNGEI, National Boy and Girl Scout Corps, secular, coed)

Affiliated to AGESCI are two minority Scouting organizations:

- the Südtiroler Pfadfinderschaft is the Catholic Scout association of the German-speaking minority in South Tyrol.
- the Slovenska Zamejska Skavtska Organizacija is the Catholic Scout association that serves the Slovenians living in the Friuli-Venezia Giulia region.

== See also ==
- Scouting in Italy
- Gualtiero Zanolini
