= DoD Secure Kiosk =

DoD Secure Kiosk (DSK) is a secure, low-cost, thin client-derived, custom-built, web browsing appliance that uses a run-time environment (RTE) instead of an operating system, to execute only the code it boots from read-only memory (ROM). It was designed by the Air Force Research Laboratory (AFRL) for low-cost and security, and to need no maintenance or updating.

DSK is accredited by the United States Air Force (USAF) for use on the Department of Defense's (DoD's) private NIPRNet network. It's deployed across the Air Force in every Judge Advocate General's Corps (JAG) office and several, major aircraft depots.
