= Gualtiero Zanolini =

Elected volunteer member of the World Scout Committee

Gualtiero Zanolini of Italy is a former member of the World Scout Committee, the main executive body of the World Organization of the Scout Movement.

== Background ==
Until 2011, Zanolini was a member of the World Scout Committee representing Italy.

After many years of effort by Zanolini, the Interreligious Scout Forum, which coordinates religious denominations in consultative status with WOSM, held the first World Scout Interreligious Symposium in Valencia, Spain, from 29 November to 2 December 2003 through support from members of the Movimiento Scout Católico.

Zanolini is a price statistician at the Italian National Institute of Statistics, and has presented before the International Working Group on Price Indices.

== See also ==
- Associazione Guide e Scouts Cattolici Italiani
- International Catholic Conference of Scouting
