= Slovenian Catholic Girl Guides and Boy Scouts Association =

Združenje slovenskih katoliških skavtinj in skavtov
- Headquarters: Štepanjsko nabrežje 34
- Location: Ljubljana
- Country: Slovenia
- Founded: March 31, 1990
- Founder: Peter Lovšin
- Membership: 5,600 and 1000 volunteers
- Chief Scout: Tjaša Sušin and Nejc Kurbus
- Affiliation: World Association of Girl Guides and Girl Scouts
- Website https://skavti.si/ http://zskss.skavt.net/

Slovenian Catholic Girl Guides and Boy Scouts Association (Slovene: Združenje slovenskih katoliških skavtinj in skavtov; abbreviated ZSKSS) is the national Guiding organization of Slovenia.

Slovenian Catholic Girl Guides and Boy Scouts Association (ZSKSS) is Slovenian Scout and Guide association, established in 1990.

ZSKSS was the first catholic youth and non communist organisation, established in one of former Yugoslav republics. It was reborn on experiences and values from other scout and guide associations, especially by support of AGESCI (Associazione Guide e Scout Cattolici Italiani) leaders from Friuli-Venezia Giulia, who helped much establishing the concept of the organizations activities (structure, education, programme).

ZSKSS is affiliated to the Slovenska Zamejska Skavtska Organizacija (SZSO) serving Slovenian Scouts in Friuli-Venezia Giulia in Italy, and also to the Associazione Guide e Scouts Cattolici Italiani (AGESCI).

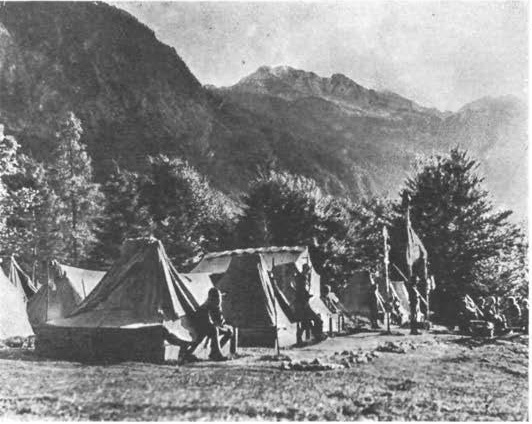
Scout camp in Bohinj (1935)

== History ==
The history of Scouting in Slovenia dates to the former Kingdom of Yugoslavia. In 1922, a meeting (slet) of Sokol, an important Pan-Slavic movement and sport organisation in Yugoslavia, took place in Ljubljana, where Bosnian and Serbian Scouts also attended. Scouting was officially established in Slovenia in October 1922, and soon a large number of Scout groups in Slovenia contributed to the establishment of the common Scout Region (named Župa) for Croatia and Slovenia, founded in Osijek. The Slovenian own Scout Region was established in early 1923 at Ljubljana. The first Slovene Scout and Guide camp was organized during the summer of 1923 at Kamniška Bistrica.

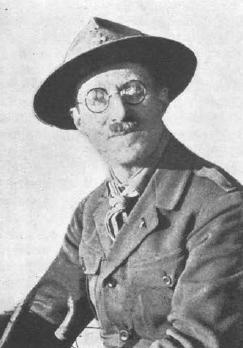
Pre-war Slovenian Scout Pavel Kunaver (1889-1988)

Scouting in Slovenia was officially dissolved on June 10, 1941 because of World War II. Just prior to the dissolution, there were 1,380 members of the Slovene Scout Organization.

=== Slovene Scout groups in exile, in Italy and Austria ===
Slovene Scouting continued after the war, in exile, at first at refugee camps in Carinthia, and afterwards in Slovene communities in Argentina and also Canada, among the Slovenes living in Italy at Gorizia, Trieste and nearby. The Scouting was organized among the Slovene ethnic groups in neighboring countries: The Slovene Carinthian Scouts organisation (1957) in Austria (today part of the Pfadfinder und Pfadfinderinnen Österreichs); the Slovene Scouts of Trieste (Slovenska Zamejska Skavtska Organizacija) (1951 at Trieste) for boys and in 1958 for girls; and the Slovene Scouts of Gorizia (SZSO - Slovenski goriški skavti) (1963) for girls and 1964 for boys as well.

== ZSKSS establishment ==
In 1984, a secondary school student from Ljubljana, Peter Lovšin, became acquainted with the Scout Movement. He decided to begin apolitical Scouting in Ljubljana. In the summer of 1985 he went to camp with Scouts from Gorizia, and in 1986 he made the Scout Promise as one of their rank. In the same year he gathered a group of young people around him in one of the Catholic parishes of Ljubljana, with assistance from Slovene Scouts from Trieste and Gorizia. The group was growing and in autumn 1988 was moved to another parish of Ljubljana. During the Saint George feast of 1989, 12 boys and girls made the Scout Promise, and by 1990, there were 21 Girl Guides and 18 Boy Scouts. The Catholic Scout Movement began to spread all over Slovenia. On March 31, 1990, the Združenje slovenskih katoliških skavtinj in skavtov (ZSKSS) was established. The first legal Scout Promises were made by 29 Girl Guides and Boy Scouts, in a suburb of Ljubljana on May 20 of that year. Officially the ZSKSS was registered on Sunday, October 22, 1992.

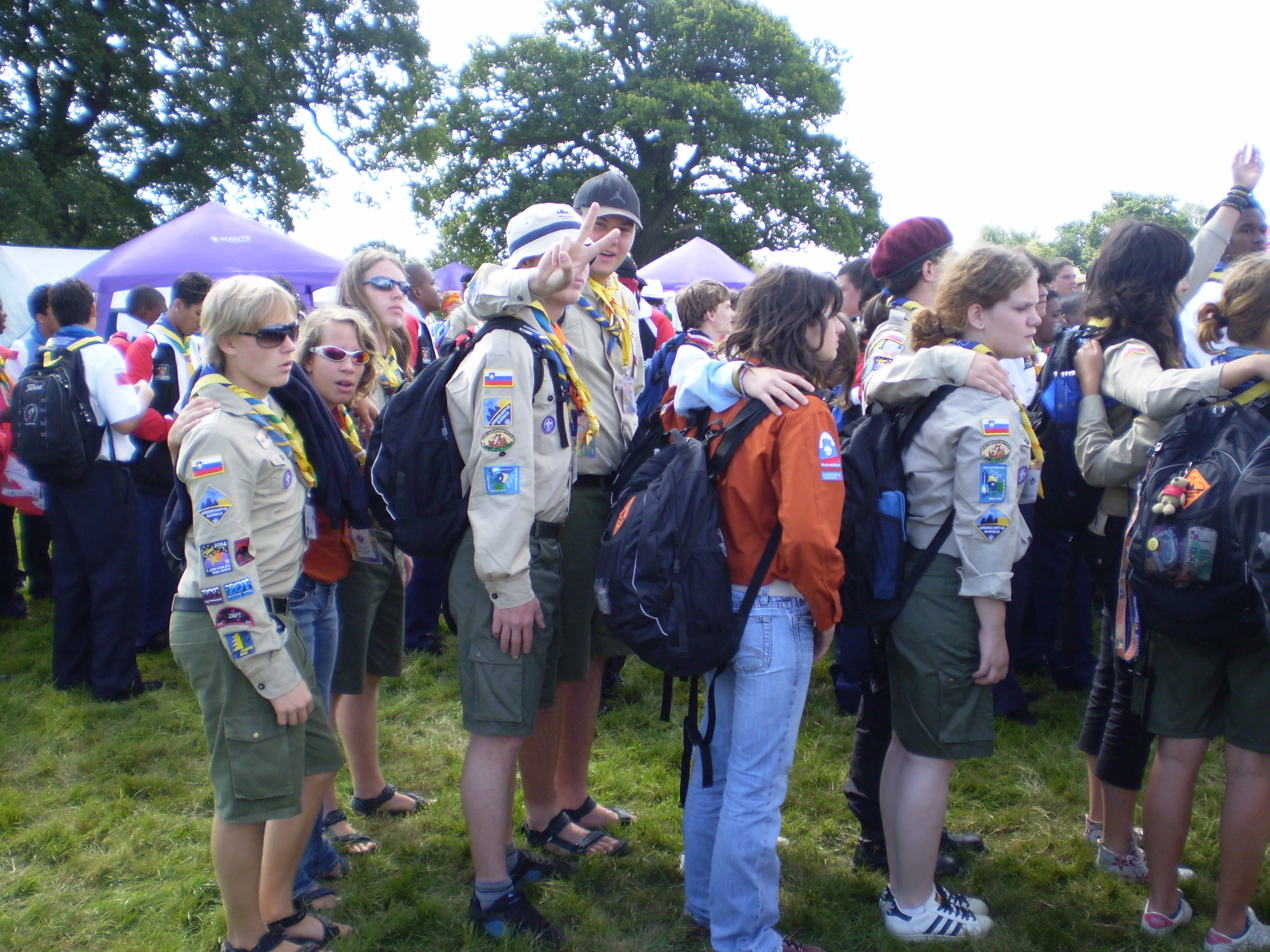
Slovene Scouts (ZTS and ZSKSS) at 21st World Scout Jamboree

== International membership ==
In 1996 ZSKSS was accepted as an associate member of WAGGGS. ZSKSS received full membership in WAGGGS in 1999. For individual members of ZSKSS, the Zveza tabornikov Slovenije, the Slovenian WOSM member, guarantees the right of personal WOSM-membership and to participate as well to the international scout events (like Jamboree's) and educational activities.

=== Program and organisation ===
The primary purpose of the Association is to contribute to the fully physical, mental, spiritual and social development of young people so that they could become people of strong character, responsible citizens and members of local, national and international communities. It has the status of an association of public interest in Slovenia on the field of education and has status of a national youth organization also.

In addition to volunteers, the organization has a few full-time employees (including a secretary and professional workers). The offices in Ljubljana are under a long-term lease and Association signed long-term lease contract with the Slovenia Forest Service for a house in Kočevski rog, officially known as the Environmental Scout Centre Kočevski Rog. The local scout groups (called steg in Slovene) form a strong network in local communities, being well organized and informed, supported by internet web pages and Facebook group sites. The Association has developed contacts with a large range of target groups, backed by a widespread support network of volunteers across Slovenia.

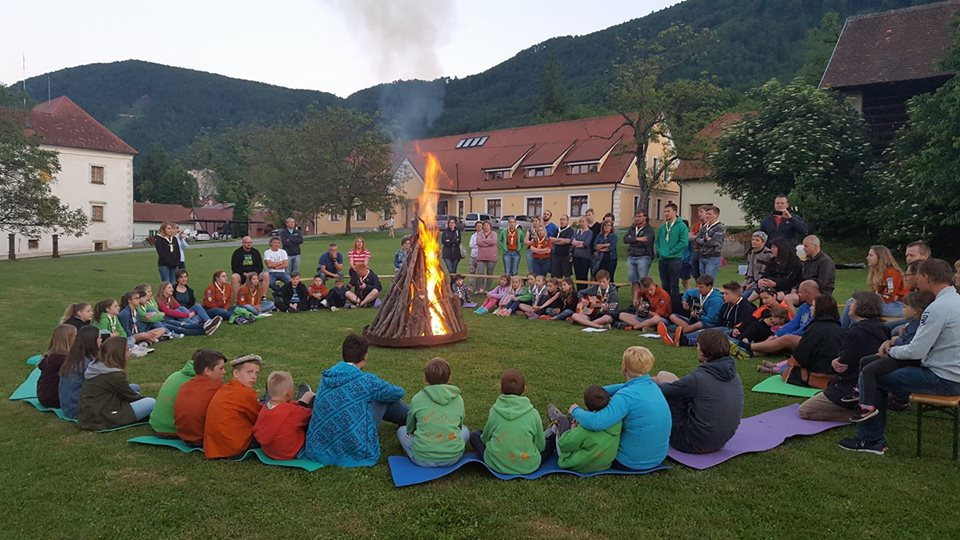

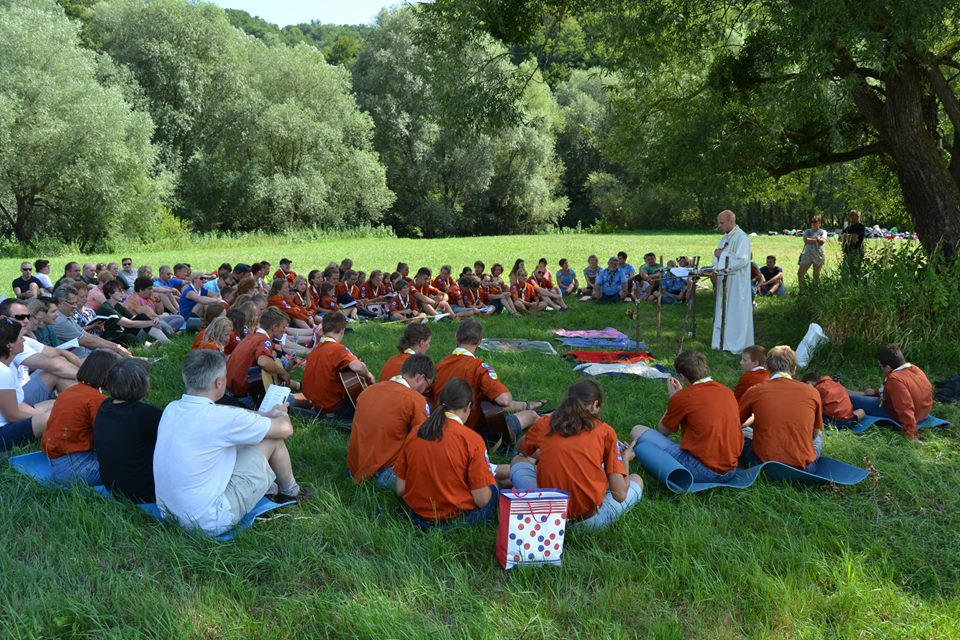

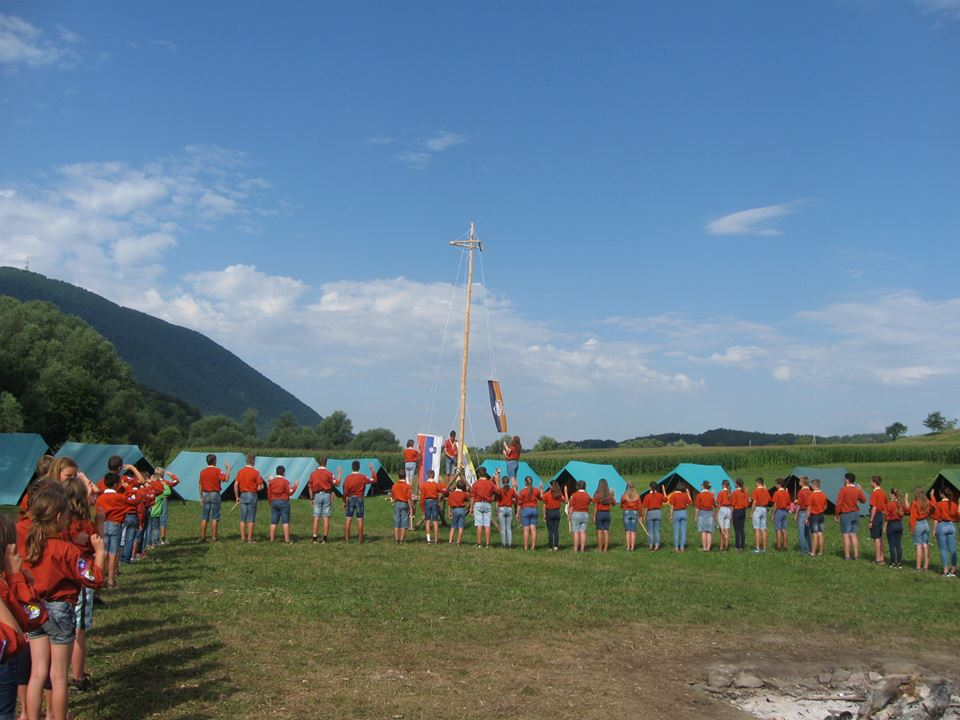
Flag formation of Slovenian catholic Scouts (ZSKSS) on Summer camp 2017

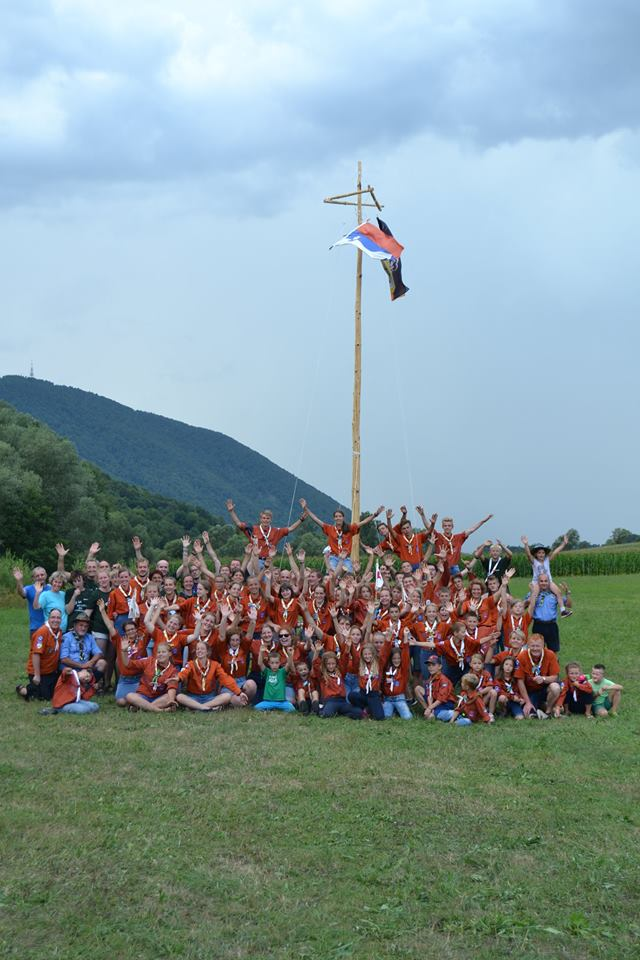

=== Sections ===
The association works in four age sections:

- Bobri/Bobrovke (Beaver Scouts, both genders) - ages 6 to 7
- Volčiči/Volkuljice (Cub Scouts; both genders) - ages 7 to 11
- Vodnice/Izvidniki in (Girls Guides/Boy Scouts) - ages 11 to 16
- Popotnice/Popotniki (Rangers/Rovers) - ages 16 to 21

=== Mottos ===
The Beavers Scout Motto: Trden jez (Solid dam) The Cubs Scout Motto: Kar najbolje (Best as possible), The Scouts/Guides Motto: Bodi pripravljen (Be Prepared), The Rover Scouts Motto: Služiti (To serve).

=== Scout Oath ===
Pri svoji časti obljubljam, da si bom z božjo pomočjo prizadeval/a služiti Bogu in domovini, pomagati svojemu bližnjemu in izpolnjevati skavtske zakone.

On my honor I promise that with divine help I will conscientiously serve God and my native land, help other people and obey the Guide/Scout Law.

=== Scout Laws ===
- Skavt si šteje v čast, da si pridobi zaupanje
  A Guide's/Scout's honor is to be trusted.
- Skavt je zvest Bogu in domovini
  A Guide/Scout is loyal to God and homeland.
- Skavt pomaga bližnjemu in naredi vsak dan vsaj eno dobro delo
  A Guide/Scout helps others and does at least one Good Turn every day.
- Skavt je prijatelj vsakomur in vsem skavtom in skavtinjam brat
  A Guide/Scout is a friend to all, and a sister/brother to every other Scout.
- Skavt je plemenit
  A Guide/Scout is courteous.
- Skavt spoštuje naravo in v njej vidi božje delo
  A Guide/Scout respects nature seeing it as the work of God.
- Skavt uboga svoje starše in predstojnike ter vestno opravlja svoje dolžnosti
  A Guide/Scout obeys her/his parents and her/his superiors and conscientiously performs her/his duties.
- Skavt si v težavah žvižga in poje
  A Guide/Scout whistles and sings in troubles.
- Skavt je delaven in varčen
  A Guide/Scout is hard-working and thrifty.
- Skavt je čist v mislih, besedah in dejanjih
  A Guide/Scout is clean in thought, word, and deed.

== Sources ==
- World Association of Girl Guides and Girl Scouts, World Bureau (1997), Trefoil Round the World. Eleventh Edition 1997. ISBN 0-900827-75-0
- Grašič, Miroslava, Skavti in gozdovniki na Slovenskem: Taborniška gibanja med Slovenci v domovini, zamejstvu, Argentini in Kanadi v 20. stoletju, Maribor 1990, Muzej narodne osvoboditve Maribor COBISS 10782
- Fužir, Barbara, Skavti: 25 zgodb za 25 let delovanja Združenja, Ljubljana 2015, ZSKSS ISBN 978-961-93642-1-5 COBISS 279071232

== Official Website ==
- Slovenian Catholic Girl Guides and Boy Scouts Association homepage, retrieved 6.4.2016
