= Malaysia National Youth Scrabble Championship =

The Malaysia National Youth Scrabble Championship (NYSC) is an annual event organised by the Malaysian Scrabble Association that identifies top youth Scrabble players in Malaysia. It serves as a qualifying tournament for the World Youth Scrabble Championship (WYSC).

The tournament generally attracts more than 200 players from all across Malaysia. This is the most prestigious national youth tournament organised by Malaysia Scrabble Association. In 2023, the championship saw the highest turnout of 240 players competing in the National Youth Scrabble Championship for players under the age of 18 and the Open Division for masters, intermediates and beginners.

== Past winners ==
Year	Winner	2nd	3rd	4th	5th	6th	7th	8th	9th	10th
2025	Nathan Tan Rui Ern	Vyasa Dheva	Aghalya Nageshvaran	Dresden Lim Zhan Le	Siddartha Mariappan	Jaishnavi Jayaganes	Alexis Koh Qiian	Josiah Leon Rapha	Joshua Ayden Lim	Aidan Nathaniel Ho
2024	Ahmad Aqmarul Harraz	Vyasa Dheva	Aghalya Nageshvaran	Josiah Leon Rapha	Siddartha Mariappan	Dresden Lim Zhan Le	Jeysstan Kumarendran	Ali Imran	Avinesh Jayaganes	Delbert Tiong Guo-yi
2023	Eirfan Bin Razman	Ahmad Aqmarul Harraz	Dresden Lim Zhan Le	Ariana Onyinyechukwu	Alexis Koh Qiian	Aidan Nathaniel Ho	Lim Eu Jie	Aghalya Nageshvaran	Chuah Rui Heng	Vyasa Dheva Nithyana
2022	Dresden Lim Zhan Le	Jareth Mah Zhen Seong	Ahmad Aqmarul Harraz Bin Azhan	Eirfan Bin Razman	Liu Shan Zhui	Ali Imran Bin Hisham Talib	Ariana Onyinyechukwu Daniel	Avinesh Jayaganes	Navish Ramash Lakhwani	Aadhi Shankara Nithyanandan
2021	Eirfan Bin Razman	Tengku Ariff Shah	Kesavan Sivabalan	Aadhi Shankara Nithyanandan	Jareth Mah Zhen Seong	Dresden Lim Zhan Le	Ahmad Aqmarul Harraz Bin Azhan	Aidan Nathaniel Ho	Navish Ramash Lakhwani	Erry Rihanna Khairil
2020	Tengku Ariff Shah	Eirfan Bin Razman	Anna Natasha	Kyan Teo	Ali Imran Bin Hisham Talib	Aidan Nathaniel Ho	Ariana Onyinyechukwu Daniel	Dresden Lim Zhan Le	Jareth Mah Zhen Seong	Jeysstan Kumarendran
2019	Khor Jia Wayn	Tengku Ariff Shah	Aadhi Shankara Nithyanandan	Khor Jia Wynn	Keeran Bathmanaban	Jareth Mah Zhen Seong	Edmond Yong Tek Jin	Ang Yi Qun	Tashwin Engad Ravana	Nur Syuhada Izrin
2018	Tengku Ariff Shah	Eirfan Bin Razman	Ali Imran Bin Hisham Talib	Aadhi Shankara Nithyanandan	Anna Natasha	Dzarif Izzat Muis Alim	Akhila Mohanaselvan	Amerenthiran Anantha	Keeran Bathmanaban	Jareth Mah Zhen Seong
2017	Tengku Ariff Shah	Keeran Bathmanaban	Ahmad Kashful Akmal	Khor Jia Wayn	Jareth Mah Zhen Seong	Adib Mukhriz Abd Malik	Megan Raj Sethu	Abu Hazeeq Fiqri Bin Abu Haniffah	Aadhi Shankara Nithyanandan	Muhammad Faiq Haikal Bin M.Haikal
2016	Tan Xin Wei	Ahmad Kashful Akmal	Muhd Alif Iman	Khor Jia Wynn	Adib Mukhriz Abd Malik	Muhd Amirul Hakeem B Md Saharudin	Muhd Azraei Iqbal	Muhd Zabir AzrRedzal	Tengku Ariff Shah	Ahmad Taufiq Azakuan
2015	Tan Xin Wei	Ahmad Taufiq Azakuan	Tengku Ariff Shah	Muhd Ridhwan M Nasir	Tinash Rawindrak	Muhd Alif Iman	Azhamirul Bin Warno	Mohd Arif Akasyah	Keeran Bathmanaban	Muhd Aqil Azhar
2014	Wan Muhd Akid Ameri	Danial Faris	Muhd Ridhwan M Nasir	Muhd Amirul Hakeem B Md Saharudin	Tengku Ariff Shah	Alif Akmal Mohd Hashim	Muhd Aqil Azhar	Jonathan Aidan Royan	Wong Zhi Yong	Muhd Alif Iman
2013	#N/A	#N/A	#N/A	#N/A	#N/A	#N/A	#N/A	#N/A	#N/A	#N/A
2012	William Kang	Choo Zi Wei	Cheong Yi Wei	Prema Maniam	Cheong Yi Hua	Ong Zhuhan	Lee Tsien Kim	Arun Maniam	Kenneth Wu Min Jin	Elvan Yeoh Yan Shin
2011	Cheong Yi Wei	Vinnith Ramamurti	William Kang	Jagan Narayanan	Ignatius Wong	Arvinran Rajendran	Looi Yih Feng	Lim Mao Fong	Chang Ching Yet	Arunan Sethu
2010	William Kang	Vinnith Ramamurti	Markus Loke Feng	Looi Yih Feng	Arvinran Rajendran	Jagan Narayanan	Gan Han Yang	Cheong Yi Wei	Wong Han Wey	Mohd Shazwan Aidid
2009	William Kang	Scott Ching Chin Wei	Ker Jen Ho	Markus Loke Qi En	Tan Kar Hee	Looi Yih Feng	Chang Ching Yet	Muhammad Nasrom	Lau Jian Ning	#N/A
2008	Ong Suanne	Khoo Beng Way	Ker Jen Ho	Ramaraj Sundraraj	Alvin Lau Yuen Ann	William Kang	Sean Chung Chin Shiu	Chin San Song	Jagan Narayanan	Chang Ching Wei
2007	Ong Suanne	Khoo Beng Way	Benjamin Cheong	Ramaraj Sundraraj	Scott Ching Chin Wei	Alvin Lau Yuen Ann	Gan Han Yang	William Kang	Sean Chung Chin Shiu	Tan Boon Aik
2006	Gan Yi En	Loh Vern Sern	Tan Jun Hong	Sean Chung Chin Shiu	Cedric Stewart	Chin Hon Yew	Brian Lim Daqing	Sarah Sim Chui Chin	Yap Jay Shen	Wendy Lee Suk Ling
