= Brownies (Scouting) =

Girl Guides for younger girls

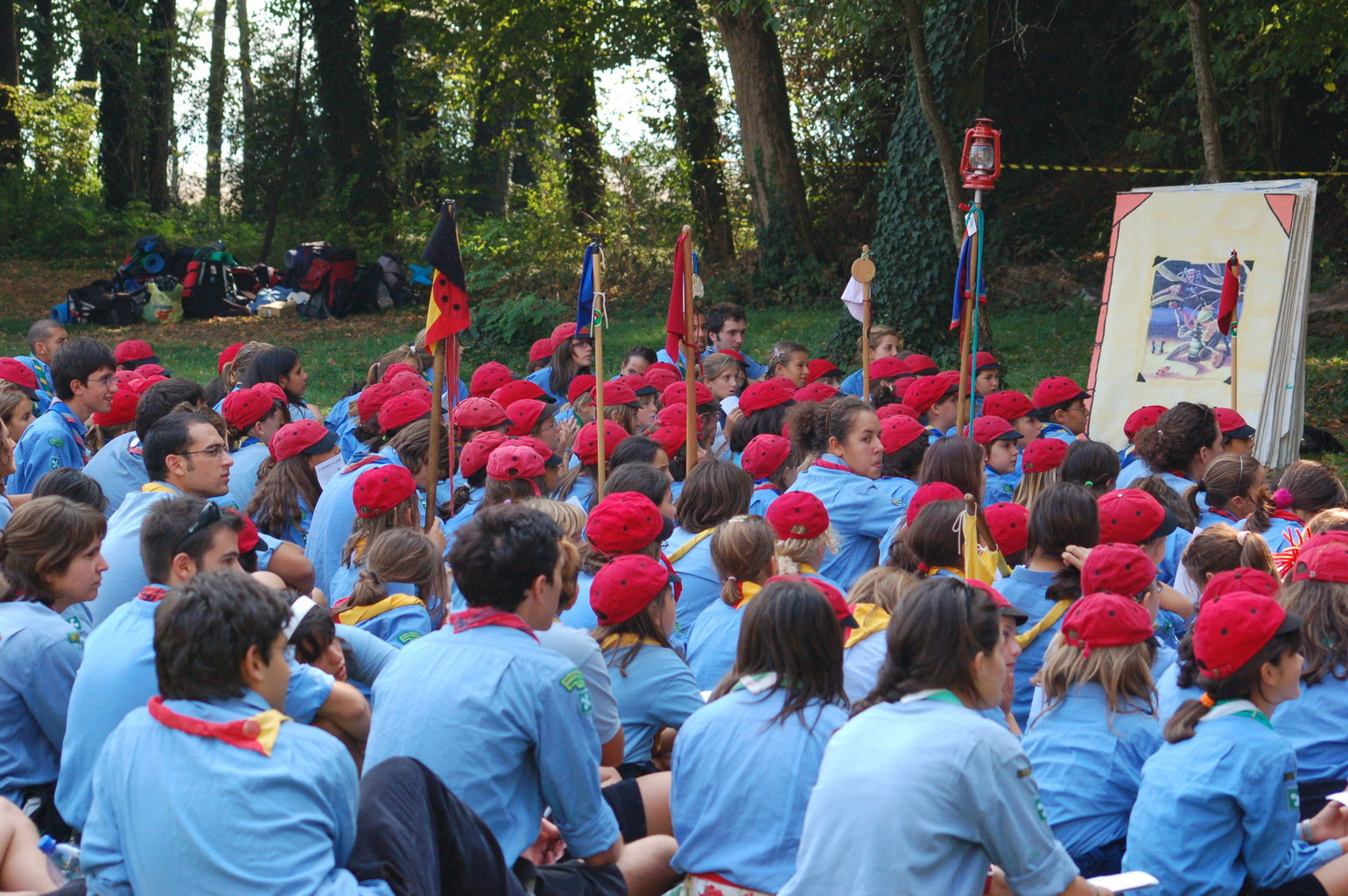
Associazione Guide e Scouts Cattolici Italiani Coccinelle (ladybirds) at a Lombard Regional Meeting in Italy

Brownies are the section in the Girl Guides (or in the United States, Girl Scouts) organisation for girls (in some organisations, there are also boys) aged seven years old to 10 1/2 years old, who are too young to be Girl Guides/Scouts. A participant in the programme is called a Brownie, and a group of Brownies is called a "Unit" while in the United States it's called a "Troop."

== History ==
Brownies (originally called "Rosebuds") were first organised by Lord Baden-Powell in 1914 to complete the range of age groups for girls in Scouting. They were first run as the youngest group in the Guide Association by Agnes Baden-Powell, Lord Baden-Powell's younger sister. In 1918, his wife, Lady Olave Baden-Powell, took over the responsibility for the Girl Guides and thus for Brownies.

Originally, the girls were called Rosebuds, but were renamed by Lord Baden-Powell after they complained that they did not like their name. Their name comes from the story "The Brownies" by Juliana Horatia Ewing, written in 1870. In the story, two children, Tommy and Betty, learn that children can be helpful brownies instead of being lazy boggarts.

In November 2022, the Girl Guides in Canada announced by January 2023 that they would rename this section of Guides, as it was deemed "a barrier to racialised girls and women" and to be more inclusive. In January 2023, the name Brownies was changed to Embers.

=== Italy ===
In some scouting associations in Italy, the term was maintained and extended to boys, coexisting with Wolf Cubs.

=== United Kingdom ===
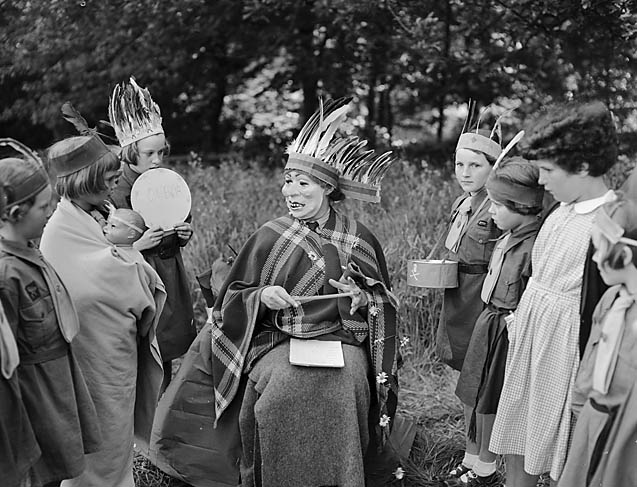
A Brownies field trip at Ellesmere in 1954

In the United Kingdom, Brownies were originally called Rosebuds. Rosebuds was started in 1914 and was originally for girls aged 8–11. Rosebuds was renamed to Brownies in 1915. In 1937 Princess Margaret became the first royal Brownie.

Brownies is the second youngest section of Girlguiding in the UK, catering for girls aged 7–10. A group of Brownies who meet together is called a unit. Brownies work in small groups called sixes: each six is named after either fairies or woodland creatures. A six is led by a Sixer and has a Second who acts as deputy. The Brownie programme is called the Brownie Adventure. It is split into 3 parts: you, community, world.

Girlguiding UK launched a renewed programme in the summer of 2018, which consists of six themes that all sections work on at different levels. Brownies gain theme awards by working on specific skills, completing activities in unit meetings and interest badges. The themes encompass adventures, social awareness, history, creativity and developing skills such as first aid and life skills.

Before the major programme update there were 57 interest badges for Brownies. These could be done in meetings with the unit or at home or in clubs such as swimming. Brownies could also work towards Adventure badges which were gained over a period of time and required girls to complete many different activities.
