= Associazione Guide Italiane =

- Founded: 1943; 83 years ago
- Defunct: 1974; 52 years ago
	Next; Associazione Guide e Scouts Cattolici Italiani

The Associazione Guide Italiane (Association of Italian Guides, AGI) was a Catholic Girl Scouting association active in Italy, founded in 1943.

In 1974, AGI merged with the Associazione Scouts Cattolici Italiani (ASCI), its male counterpart, started in 1916, to form the Associazione Guide e Scouts Cattolici Italiani (AGESCI), one of the first co-educational organizations in world Scouting. Many AGI leaders who disagreed with the merger (and the principle of co-education) formed the Associazione Italiana Guide e Scouts d'Europa Cattolici (AIGSEC) in 1976, along with former leaders of ASCI and disgruntled members of AGESCI.

== See also ==
- Scouting and Guiding in Italy
