= Mario Mazza =

Italian educator

Mario Mazza (7 June 1882 in Genoa – 22 November 1959 in Verona) was an Italian educator.

In 1916, he was one of the founding members of ASCI (Italian: Associazione Scautistica Cattolica Italiana), which became the Scouts Association of Catholic Italians. Mazza was part of the Catholic Scouting movement until 1926, when the Italian fascist government under Benito Mussolini made such organizations illegal. Beginning with the 1937–38 school year, he was the headmaster of the Royal Experimental Elementary School, named after the writer Leopoldo Franchetti, that attempted to serve as a model for a true fascist school.
