= Associazione Italiana Guide e Scouts d'Europa Cattolici =

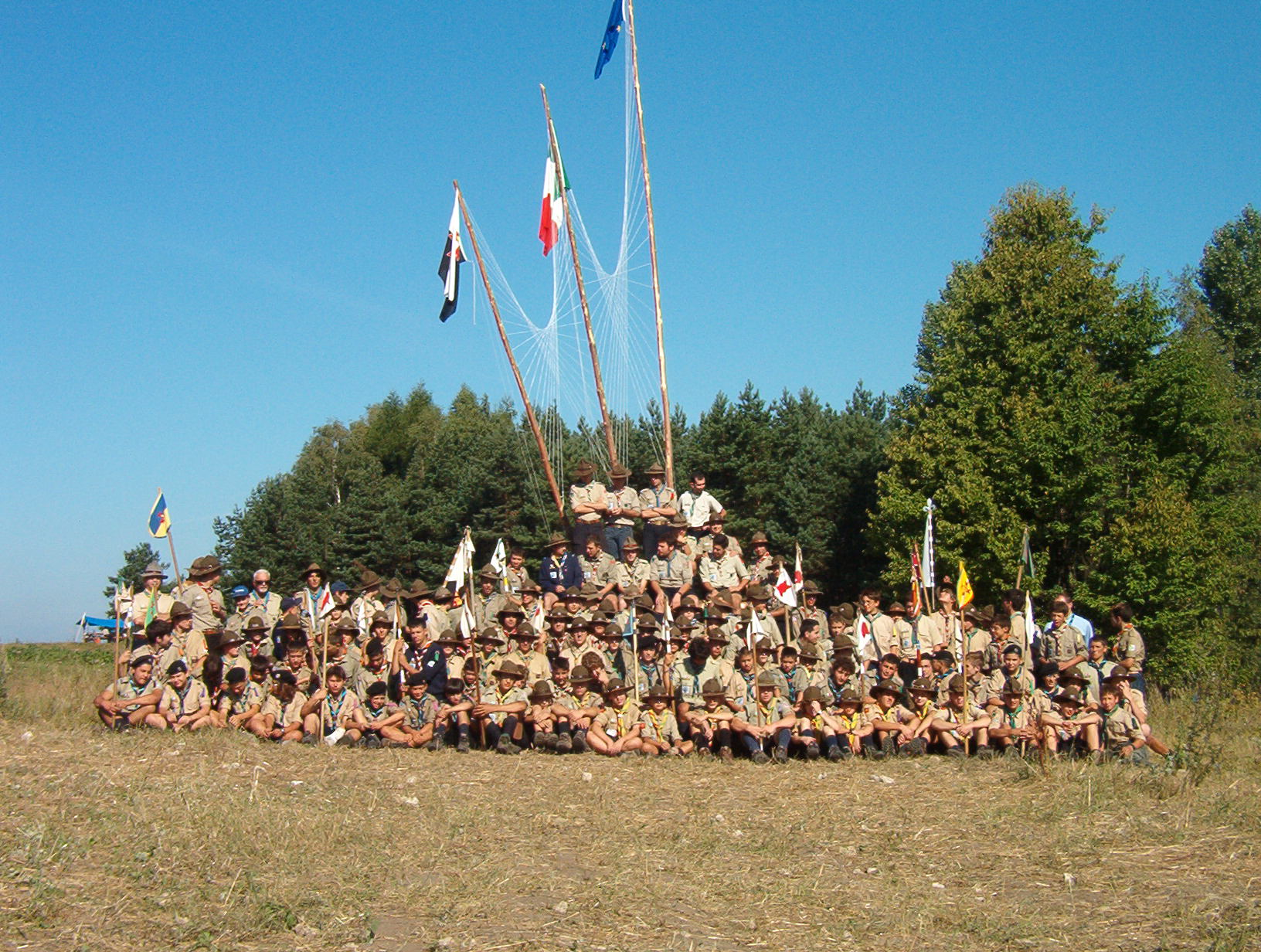
- Founded: 1976
- Membership: 20,132
- President: Franco Caldato
- Vice President: Marisa Licursi
- Scout Commissioner General: Paolo Bramini
- Guide Commissioner General: Manuela Evangelisti
- Ecclesiastical Assistant: Don Stefano Zeni
- Affiliation: International Union of Guides and Scouts of Europe
- Website https://fse.it

The Associazione Italiana Guide e Scouts d'Europa Cattolici (translation: Italian Association Catholic Guides and Scouts of Europe), also referred to as Scouts d'Europa - FSE, is a Catholic Scouting and Guiding association in Italy, formed in 1976.

In 1974 the Associazione Scouts Cattolici Italiani (ASCI, established in 1916) and the Associazione Guide Italiane (AGI, established in 1943), the main Catholic male and female associations, were merged into the co-educational Associazione Guide e Scouts Cattolici Italiani (AGESCI). Two years later, some AGESCI groups and individual members, along with some ASCI and AGI leaders who had disagreed with the merger (and, above all, opposed the principle of coeducation) and had refused to join AGESCI, formed the Associazione Italiana Guide e Scouts d'Europa Cattolici (Scouts d'Europa - FSE).

As of 2024, AIGSEC included 20,132 members, 183 local groups and 1,276 units, making it the second-largest organisation of that kind in the country, second only to AGESCI. The Scouts d'Europa - FSE, is also the second-largest member of the International Union of Guides and Scouts of Europe - European Scouting Federation (UIGSE–FSE).
