= Zveza tabornikov Slovenije =

National Scouting organization of Slovenia

- Country: Slovenia
- Membership: 5,179
- Affiliation: World Organization of the Scout Movement
- Website www.taborniki.si

Zveza tabornikov Slovenije (ZTS, Scout Association of Slovenia) is the national Scouting organization of Slovenia. Scouting in Slovenia was started in 1922; ZTS was founded in 1951 as sub-association of Savez Izviđača Jugoslavije. It became independent in 1991 and the 138th member of the World Organization of the Scout Movement in 1994. The coeducational association has 5,179 members (as of 2011).

ZTS cooperates with Združenje slovenskih katoliških skavtinj in skavtov (ZSKSS), which guarantees access to WAGGGS events.

Zveza tabornikov Slovenije is divided into standalone units called "rod" (troops), which are divided into smaller units called "četa" (patrols).

== Program and ideals ==
The ZTS is one of the few Scout associations that is still influenced by the ideas of Ernest Thompson Seton and his Woodcraft movement.

The Scout emblem dates from the Yugoslav era and incorporates a Scout campfire and a Woodcraft tepee on three pine trees in the shape of Slovenia's highest mountain Triglav, the Slovene national symbol.

ZTS is divided in five age sections:

- Murni (Pre Cub Scouts) – younger than 7
- Medvedki in Čebelice (Cub Scouts) – ages 7 to 11
- Gozdovniki in Gozdovnice (Scouts) – ages 11 to 16
- Popotniki in Popotnice (Venture Scouts) – ages 16 to 21
- Raziskovalci in Raziskovalke (Rover Scout) – ages 22 to 26
- Grče – 27 and older

=== Motto ===
The Scout Motto is Z naravo k boljšemu človeku!, translating as With Nature to a Better Person! in Slovenian.

=== Scout Law ===
- Tabornik je zanesljiv (Dependable)
- Tabornik je zvest (Loyal)
- Tabornik je prijazen (Kind)
- Tabornik je pripravljen pomagati (Helpful)
- Tabornik je discipliniran (Disciplined)
- Tabornik je veder (Cheerful)
- Tabornik je pogumen (Valiant)
- Tabornik je plemenit (Noble)
- Tabornik je spoštljiv (Respectful)
- Tabornik je vedoželjen (Courteous)
- Tabornik je varčen (Thrifty)
- Tabornik živi zdravo (Healthy)

=== National events ===
In August 2022, the organisation held a national jamboree, "Zlet" ("Flight"), with 700 participants and 300 adult volunteers, at the Cerkno Ski Resort, near Cerkno in the Slovene Littoral.
