= Deutschsprachige Konferenz der Pfadfinderverbände =

- Country: international
- Founded: 1969

The Deutschsprachige Konferenz (DSK) ("German-speaking Conference") is the international community of scout and guide national organisations in the German-speaking countries. Members of this informal group are the scout organisations registered with WOSM and WAGGGS in Germany, Austria, Switzerland, Liechtenstein, Luxembourg, and Belgium, but also in the Netherlands, Ireland, South Tyrol, Hungary and Poland.

The DSK started as a language-based meeting, but has developed into a common platform aimed at informal cooperation between WOSM/WAGGGS organisations.

Since then, the DSK has met annually in the first half of March. The DSK takes place in a different DSK member country each year. Each DSK has a different theme chosen by the organising association. The member associations usually send a delegation consisting of members of the respective international teams. It is customary to also invite German-speaking members of the WOSM and WAGGGS governing bodies at European or world level.

== History ==
Conferences have been held at:

Year	Country	Location
1969	Germany	Überlingen
1970	Austria	Lengenfeld
1971	Liechtenstein	Vaduz
1986	Germany	Reichenau Island
1996	Luxemburg	Luxembourg City
2000	Switzerland	Adelboden
2001	Germany	Rieneck
2004	Belgium	Burg-Reuland
2005	Netherlands	Ermelo
2006	South Tyrol	Goldrain
2007	Liechtenstein	Schaan
2008	Hungary	Budapest
2009	Switzerland	Kandersteg
2010	Poland	Warsaw
2011	Germany	
2017	Liechtenstein	Vaduz
2018		
2019	Hungary	Budapest
2020	Germany	Hamburg
2021	Online	
2022	Austria	Salzburg
2023	Luxembourg	Luxembourg City
2024	Belgium	Eupen
2025	Netherlands	Zeewolde
