= Corpo Nazionale Giovani Esploratori ed Esploratrici Italiani =

Italian Scouting and Guiding association

- Senior Scouts
- Headquarters: Rome
- Country: Italy
- Founded: 30 June 1913
- Membership: 13,500
- Chief Scout: Mariano Iadanza
- President: Filomena Grasso
- Affiliation: Italian Scout Federation
- Website cngei.it

Terrestrial	Sea scouts

The Corpo Nazionale Giovani Esploratori ed Esploratrici Italiani (translation: National Corp of Italian Young Scouts and Guides, CNGEI) is a coeducational and secular Scouting and Guiding association in Italy.

CNGEI was founded by Carlo Colombo (1869–1918), a Piedmontese doctor, as a male-only organisation in 1913 and integrated the female Unione delle Giovinette Esploratrici Italiane (UNGEI) in 1976. It is the oldest among Italian Scout associations and the third by membership, with about 13,500 members.

Along with the 184,000-strong Associazione Guide e Scouts Cattolici Italiani (AGESCI), CNGEI forms the Italian Scout Federation (FIS), Italy's national member of the World Organization of the Scout Movement (WOSM) and the World Association of Girl Guides and Girl Scouts (WAGGGS). CNGEI, whose guiding principles are "secularity" (i.e. "independen[ce] from any religious creed and political ideologies"), "co-education", "associative democracy", "adult choice" and "civil commitment", aims at "educating the good citizen: a citizen capable of taking autonomous and responsible choices; [a citizen who is] personally active in promoting solidarity, universal rights, peace, environment protection; a citizen who follows a personal spiritual path oriented at giving a sense to his/her life".

== See also ==
- Scouting and Guiding in Italy
