= Slovenska Zamejska Skavtska Organizacija =

- Headquarters: Viale XX. septembre 85
- Location: 34710 Gorizia
- Country: Italy
- Founded: 15. December 1976
- Website http://www.szso.net/

The Slovenska Zamejska Skavtska Organizacija (Slovene Minority Scout Organization, SZSO) is a Catholic Scouting and Guiding association serving Slovenes in Friuli-Venezia Giulia, Italy. SZSO has a pact of cooperation with the Associazione Guide e Scouts Cattolici Italiani (AGESCI), the largest Scouting association in the country. SZSO is also affiliated to the Združenje slovenskih katoliških skavtinj in skavtov (ZSKSS), the largest Scouting association in Slovenia.

SZSO, whose first group was organized in 1951, was officially founded in 1976.
