= Associazione Scouts Cattolici Italiani =

Catholic Scouting association in Italy

- Founded: 1916
- Defunct: 1974
| | Next; Associazione Guide e Scouts Cattolici Italiani |

The Associazione Scouts Cattolici Italiani (Association of Italian Catholic Scouts, ASCI) was a Catholic Scouting association active in Italy from 1916 to 1974, while being suspended under Fascism.

In 1974, after a long debate, ASCI was merged with the Associazione Guide Italiane (AGI), its female counterpart, started in 1943, to form the Associazione Guide e Scouts Cattolici Italiani (AGESCI), one of the first coeducational organizations in world Scouting. Many ASCI leaders who disagreed with the merger (and the principle of coeducation) formed the Associazione Italiana Guide e Scouts d'Europa Cattolici (AIGSEC) in 1976, along with former leaders of AGI and disgruntled members of AGESCI.

== See also ==
- Scouting and Guiding in Italy
