= Pfadfinder und Pfadfinderinnen Österreichs =

Austrian Scouting and Guiding organization

Pfadfinder*innen Österreichs
- Austrian Boy Scouts and Girl Guides
- Age range: Bievers: 5-7; Wichtel and Wölflinge (Cubs): 7-10; Scouts and Guides: 10-13; Caravelles and Explorers: 13-16; Rangers and Rovers: 16-20; Scout Leader: 17+
- Headquarters: Vienna, Austria
- Location: Austria
- Country: Austria
- Founded: 1913; 113 years ago (notable mergers in 1946 and 1976)
- Membership: 30,000
- Chairperson: Sabrina Prochaska; Maximilian Müller
- Affiliation: World Association of Girl Guides and Girl Scouts, World Organization of the Scout Movement
- Governing body: National Board
- Website ppoe.at

Pfadfinder und Pfadfinderinnen Österreichs (PPÖ; Austrian Boy Scouts and Girl Guides) is the largest Scouting and Guiding organization in Austria and the only one approved by World Association of Girl Guides and Girl Scouts (WAGGGS) and the World Organization of the Scout Movement (WOSM). The association claims more than 300 troops (local units) with more than 85,000 Scouts nationwide. WOSM and WAGGGS give quite smaller membership values for the PPÖ: 27,274 members in WOSM (as of 2021) and 10,508 members in WAGGGS (as of 2003).

The badge of the PPÖ is dark red with a white combination of a fleur-de-lis and a trefoil, the symbols of WOSM and WAGGGS, respectively. In the center of the crest is a lighter red-and-white shield bearing the heraldic colors of Austria. The badges of both supranational organizations are also used. Male Scouts wear a purple WOSM logo on their uniforms, females wear the WAGGGS trefoil in the same position.

The association is a member of the Austrian National Youth Council.

== History ==
Austrian Scouting was first established in 1909 in Austria-Hungary. In 1910, the first scout group – still in existence today – was founded in Wiener Neustadt. In 1912, Emmerich Teuber founded the first scout group in Vienna. The Catholic Church founded the Pfadfinderkorps Sankt Georg at the same time. First camps were held in 1913.

As the movement spread, girls became part of it in 1913 and troops were founded all over the country. An umbrella organization, the Österreichischer Pfadfinderbund (ÖPB), was founded in April 1914 and included the Girl Guide movement. This organization had strong ties to Magyar Cserkészszövetség and Junák, which were independent Scout associations in Bohemia. After World War I, scouting re-developed independently in Slovenia and in other areas of the former Habsburg Empire.

The ÖPB's programs expanded to include Cub Scouts in 1920 and Rovers in 1921. Austria's movement also gained international recognition as a founding member of WOSM during an international conference in 1922; it hosted another international conference in 1931 (in Baden bei Wien). The Girl Guides Association grew more prominent with the foundation of the Österreichischer Pfadfinderinnenbund, which was part of the national organization and was led by Marie Antoinette Hofmann; this was followed by an independent girls' association, formed in 1929, called Bund der Helferinnen. Austrian Scouts introduced Mother's Day to Austria, originally to honor the mother of the Bundespräsident at the time.

In 1922, Catholic groups within the Österreichischer Pfadfinderbund united in the "Ring der St.Georgspfadfinder". In 1926 they left the Österreichischer Pfadfinderbund and founded the Österreichisches Pfadfinderkorps St.Georg, which also gained international recognition. 9,410 Scouts (ÖPB: 3,000, ÖPK St.Georg: 6,410) were registered in 1,025 troops in 1937.

Beginning in 1934, there was a state-sponsored youth organization that competed heavily with Austrian scouting. With the arrival of the Nazis and World War II, however, Scouting in Austria was banned altogether. A number of scout leaders were arrested in 1938 and scouting went underground, members at times associating with the Red Cross and other organisations.

At the first celebration of the end of World War II, there were Scouts in uniform on the streets. More than 800 Scouts and Scoutleaders left Austria in 1938. "Austrian Scouts in Great Britain" was the Austrian Scouts-in-Exile organisation. Between 1939 and 1945 "Der neue Weg" was published as Austrian Scout magazine in Exile.

Austrian Boy Scouts were readmitted to WOSM in 1946. Wishing for unity, the various national organizations combined to form the Pfadfinder Österreichs, which hosted the 7th World Scout Jamboree in Bad Ischl in 1951 with 12,884 participants from 61 countries. After only a few short years, however, several leading figures left the Pfadfinder Österreichs to reestablish the Österreichischer Pfadfinderbund in 1949.

In 1956, Austrian Scouts helped refugees after the Hungarian Revolution of 1956.

Austrian Scouts celebrated 26 October as "Day of the Austrian Flag" for long years.

The first national Austrian jamboree occurred in 1961, and continued every ten years.

In October 1946, the Bund Österreichischer Pfadfinderinnen (BÖP) was founded in Vienna. Among the founder members was Charlotte Teuber-Weckersdorf.

In 1948, the Catholic groups united in the Arbeitsgemeinschaft katholischer Gruppen im Bund Österreichischer Pfadfinderinnen (work group of Catholic groups of Bund Österreichischer Pfadfinderinnen). 1950 the Catholic groups left the "Bund Österreichischer Pfadfinderinnen" and founded the Österreichischer Pfadfinderinnenverband Sankt Georg (ÖPVSG). The Bund Österreichischer Pfadfinderinnen declined.

In 1957, the ÖPVSG became an associate member of WAGGGS, receiving full member status in 1969.

The boys and girls associations were finally merged again in 1976, forming the modern Pfadfinder und Pfadfinderinnen Österreichs.

In 1995, the Pfadfinder und Pfadfinderinnen Österreichs and the Österreichischer Pfadfinderbund signed a cooperative agreement.

Celebrating the 100th birthday of the Scout Movement in Austria, a jubilee jamboree, named "urSPRUNG 2010 – Austrian Jubilee Jamboree", took place on the palace grounds of Laxenburg Castle in August 2010 (2–12 August). The Austrian National Jamborees of 1936 and 1961 also took place on the same grounds.

== Divisions ==
There are nine geographical divisions of the PPÖ, one for each State of Austria. Every Scout wears the badge of his state on his uniform.

- Vorarlberg – cloth banner on a white field
- Tyrol – red eagle on a white field
- Salzburg – red yellow lion on white
- Upper Austria – red and white stripes with a yellow eagle on a black field
- Lower Austria – blue field with five yellow eagles
- Styria – green field with a white panther
- Carinthia – white field with three red yellow lions on the left side
- Burgenland – yellow field with a red eagle on a stone
- Vienna – red with a white cross

== Program ==
Within the PPÖ there exist four official age classes.

- Age 7 – 10 – Wichtel (girls; Brownies) and Wölflinge (boys; Cub Scouts)
- Age 10 – 13 – Guides (girls) and Späher (boys)
- Age 13 – 16 – Caravelles (girls) and Explorers (boys)
- Age 16 – 20 – Rangers (girls) and Rovers (boys, Rover Scouts)

Some troops, notably in Eastern Austria, have introduced a Biber (Beaver) class for children younger than 7. This class is officially tolerated but not otherwise recognized by the PPÖ.

== Uniform ==
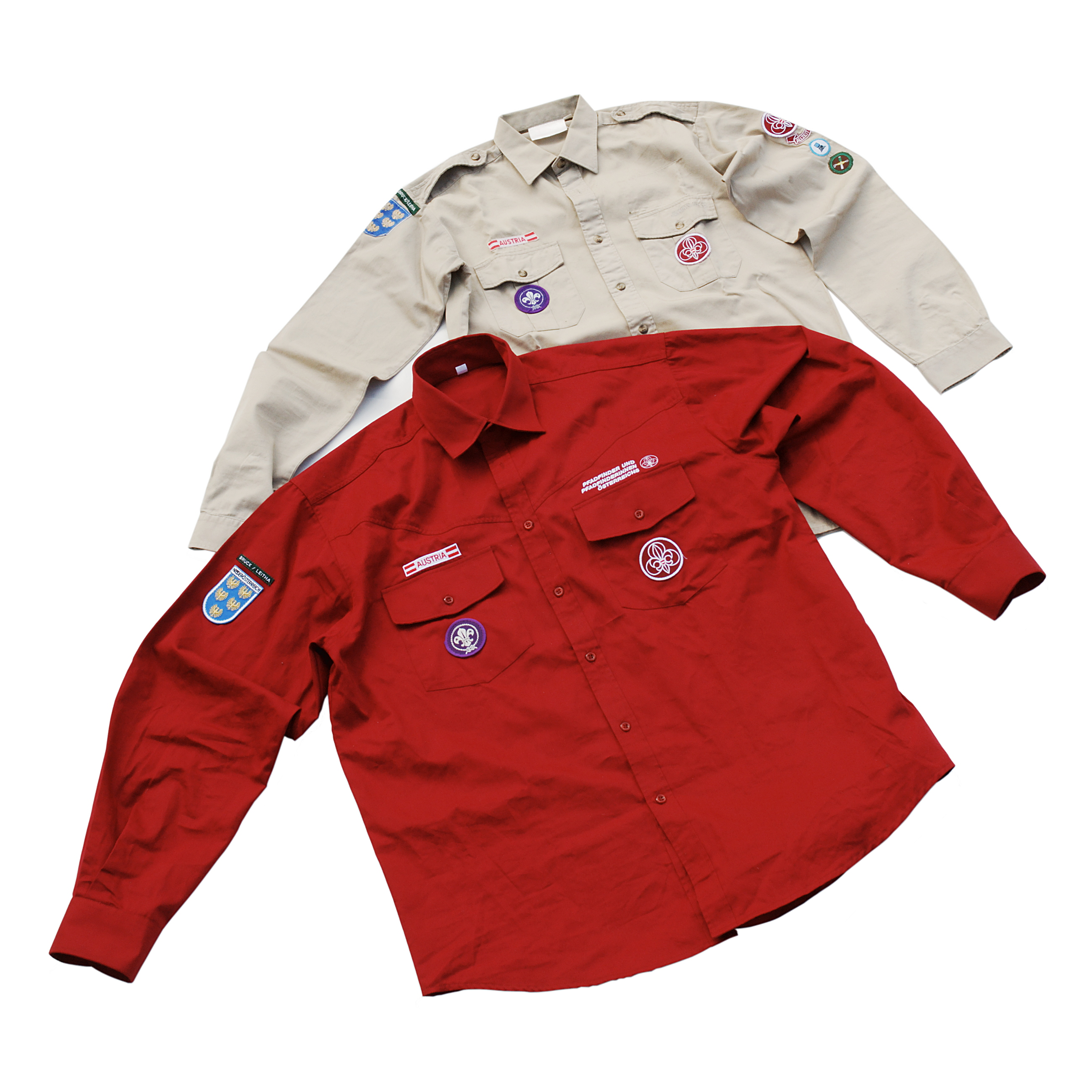

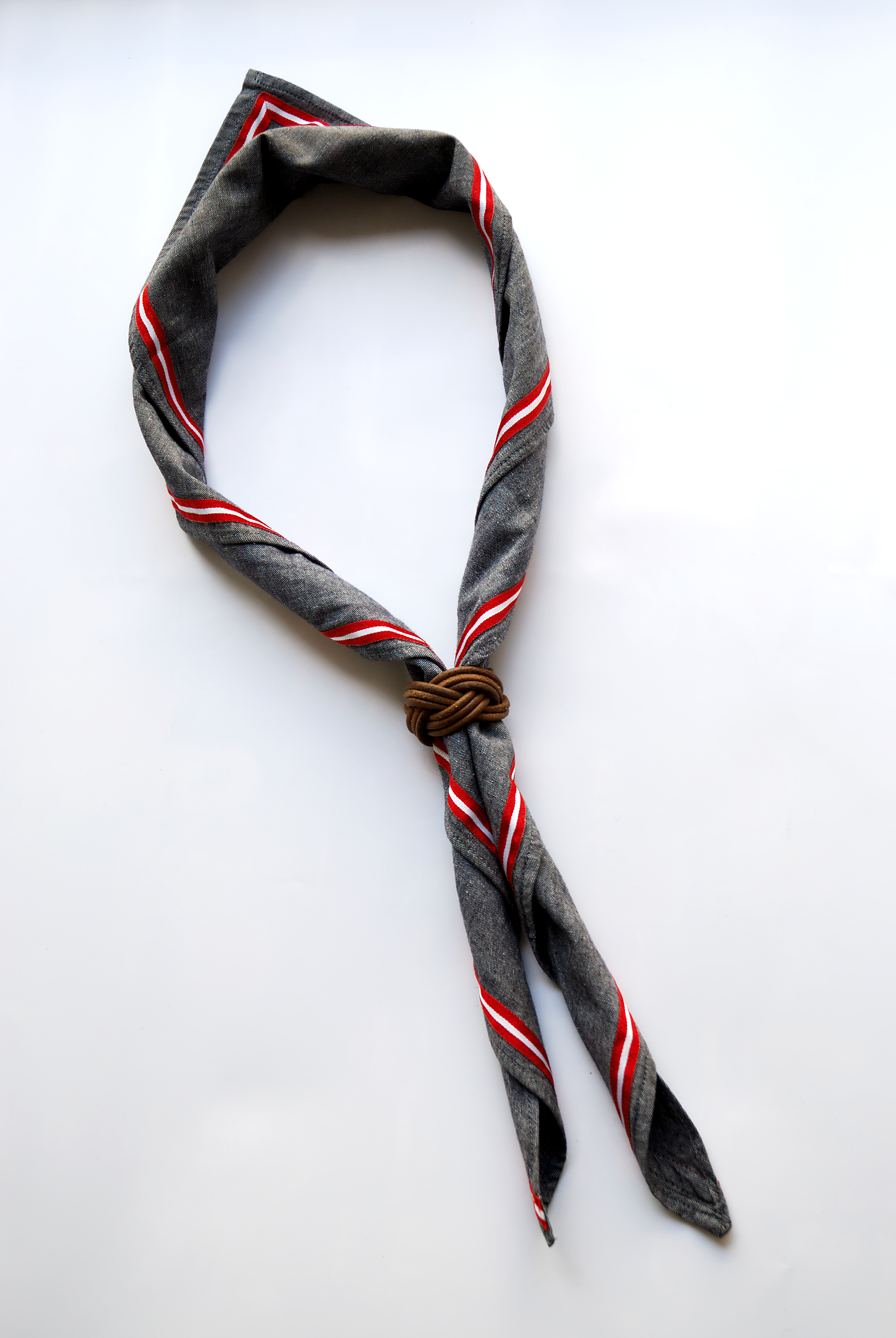

Traditionally, all scouts wear their neckerchief. Depending on the region and/or local tradition, this can either be group specific or shared with other groups of the same region. There also is an official Austrian neckerchief for international use.

Wichtel and Wölflinge usually wear a royal blue T-shirt and/or sweatshirt with logo, while all other age classes wear a maroon uniform shirt. For more strenuous activities, various alternative t-shirts exist. Traditional wide brimmed Scout hats are a popular if optional choice.

== Sea Scouts ==
There are Sea Scout groups in

- Hainburg an der Donau ;
- Vienna ;
- Villach ;
- St. Georgen an der Gusen (the "Seepfadfinder" are part of the Scout group 4222 );
- Neusiedel am See and
- Graz (the "Flusspfadfinder" are part of the Scout group Graz 5 Kalvarienberg ).

== Peace Light of Bethlehem ==
The Peace Light of Bethlehem is a program inaugurated in Austria in 1986 as part of a charitable relief mission for handicapped children and people in need. It has gone to more than 20 countries in Europe, as well as the Americas.

In 2007, a delegation of Guides and Scouts from Austria, Germany, Israel, Jordan and the Palestinian National Authority together lit the Peace Light in Bethlehem. Also in 2005 the International Commissioner of Austria Thomas Ertlthaler passed the Peace Light to a delegation of Guides and Scouts from the Palestinian National Authority under the leadership of Saed Shomali, the International Commissioner of the Palestinian Scout Association.

== See also ==
- Leopold Figl, first Austrian Federal Chancellor after World War II,
- Elisabeth Gehrer, Austrian Federal Minister of Education, Science and Culture,
- Heinrich Maier, important Austrian resistance fighter against National Socialism,
- Heinz Zemanek, Austrian computer pioneer,
- Südtiroler Pfadfinderschaft
