= Associazione Guide e Scouts Cattolici Italiani =

Catholic Scouting and Guiding association in Italy

- Association of Italian Catholic Guides and Scouts (AGESCI)
- Age range: 8-21 years old
- Headquarters: Piazza P. Paoli, 18; 00186 Rome
- Country: Italy
- Founded: 1974
- Membership: 182,000 (2024)
- Presidents of the National Committee: Francesco Scoppola (Lazio); Roberta Vincini (Emilia-Romagna)
- Chief Scout: Fabrizio Marano (Calabria)
- Chief Guide: Giorgia Caleari (Veneto)
- Ecclesiastical Assistant-General: Andrea Turchini (Emilia-Romagna)
- Website www.agesci.it

The Associazione Guide e Scouts Cattolici Italiani (English: Association of Italian Catholic Guides and Scouts, AGESCI) is a Catholic Scouting and Guiding association in Italy. It is coeducational and, as of 2024, has 182,000 members, including 33,454 leaders (of whom 1,947 priests), 1,885 local groups and 6,126 units, making it the country's largest scouting/guiding, as well as youth, association. It is currently presided by Francesco Scoppola and Roberta Vincini.

== History ==
AGESCI was formed in 1974 upon the merger of the Associazione Scouts Cattolici Italiani (ASCI, founded in 1916) and the Associazione Guide Italiane (AGI, founded in 1943). As early as in 1976, some AGESCI groups and individual members, along with some ASCI and AGI leaders who had disagreed with the merger (and, above all, opposed the principle of coeducation) and had refused to join AGESCI, formed the 20,000-strong Associazione Italiana Guide e Scouts d'Europa Cattolici (AIGSEC/FSE).

Since 1986 AGESCI has formed, along with the 12,000-strong non-denominational Corpo Nazionale Giovani Esploratori ed Esploratrici Italiani (CNGEI), the Italian Scout Federation (FIS), Italy's national member of the World Organization of the Scout Movement (WOSM) and the World Association of Girl Guides and Girl Scouts (WAGGGS). AGESCI is also a member of the International Catholic Conference of Scouting (ICCS) and the International Catholic Conference of Guiding (ICCG), of which ASCI and AGI were founding members, respectively. In Italy, AGESCI is recognised by the Catholic Episcopal Conference, is a member of the Forum Nazionale del Terzo Settore (where terzo settore means voluntary sector) and co-operates with Civil Protection Department of the Presidency of the Council of Ministers.

The Südtiroler Pfadfinderschaft (SP), a Catholic association in German-speaking South Tyrol, the Slovenska Zamejska Skavtska Organizacija (SZSO), serving Slovenes in Friuli-Venezia Giulia, and the Associazione Guide Esploratori Cattolici Sammarinesi (AGECS) of San Marino have pacts of cooperation with AGESCI.

In 2024 AGESCI marked its 50th anniversary with a "national route" in Verona, with the participation of virtually 20,000 leaders.

== Organisation ==
AGESCI has a federal structure, composed of regional sections, provincial/diocesan sections and local groups. The region with more AGESCI members is Emilia-Romagna (13.2% of the total), followed by Veneto (13.1%) and Lombardy (10.7%), all three in northern Italy. As a result, 49.6% of AGESCI members are in northern Italy (29.7% in northeast Italy and 19.9% in northwest Italy), 20.5% in central Italy and 29.4% in southern Italy and the Isles. Veneto is first by groups (11.5%) and units (12.1%).

There are three age ranges in AGESCI, present in most groups and forming three different types of units, following the traditional age group format:

- L/C: Lupetti and/or Coccinelle (Wolf Cubs and/or Brownies), aged 8–11/12, organised into packs;
- E/G: Esploratori and Guide (Explorers and Guides), aged 11/12–16, organised into troops, subdivided in patrols;
- R/S: Rover and Scolte (Rover Scouts and Ranger Guides), aged 16–21, organised into crews.

Units can be only-male, only-female or coeducational. In the latter case they have to be led by a male leader and a female leader. Mono-sex E/G units are quite frequent (as of 2024, 47% of the total in Liguria, 43% in Marche, 39% in Emilia-Romagna, 36% in Veneto, 29% in Sardinia, 29% in Campania, 21% in Tuscany, 18% Sicily, 17% in Lazio, etc.). L/C mono-sex units are rare and are more likely in regions where the Coccinelle have a strong tradition and presence (mainly: 23% in Marche, 20% in Sardinia and 17% in Emilia-Romagna). Finally, R/S mono-sex units are even rarer (2% in Sicily and Campania).

Each group is co-ordinated by two group leaders and directed by a comunità capi (leaders' community), where all adult leaders and at least a priest belong. It meets quite often (weekly in most cases) to plan all educational activities in the group. Its work is driven by a multi-year (usually three-year) progetto educativo (educational plan), which gives a common thread to the program of all units, ensuring a common focus across all age ranges. Rover scouts and ranger guides may join a group's leaders' community upon completing their education and leaving the crew; more specifically, this moment is marked by a ceremony called partenza (departure).

In order to be awarded of the Wood Badge, scout leaders need to go through a lengthy training, mainly consisting of three formation camps, as well as a few years of service before, between and after these camps. In 1986 Pope John Paul II was given the Wood Badge insignia as honorary AGESCI leader.

== See also ==
- Scouting and Guiding in Italy
