= Scouting in South East England =

Scouting in South East England provides an overview of Scouting activities in the governmental region of South East England. The largest number of Scouts and volunteer leaders in the region is linked to the Scout Association of the United Kingdom, while there is also a presence of traditional Scouting groups, such as the Baden-Powell Scouts' Association. The Scout Association administers the region through 9 Scout Counties, overseen by a regional commissioner, which follow the boundaries of the ceremonial counties they exist within. There are also a number of Scouting clubs within Universities in the region which are affiliated to the Student Scout and Guide Organisation.

== The Scout Association Counties ==
=== Royal Berkshire Scout County ===
County badge as worn on the uniform of Scouting members in Royal Berkshire

Royal Berkshire Scout County is concurrent with the ceremonial county of Berkshire, and provides Scouting opportunities for 7,500 young people and adults in the area. The County includes the towns of Newbury, Reading, Bracknell, Slough and Windsor. The county is led by a volunteer management team of around twenty volunteers and are supported by three paid staff in administrative and development roles. Management of Scouts in Berkshire is currently divided into eleven Scout Districts:

- Kennet (named for the River Kennet and centred on Newbury)
- Loddon (named for the River Loddon and centred on Woodley)
- Maidenhead
- Pang Valley (named for the River Pang and containing the communities to the West of Reading)
- Reading Central
- Slough
- South Berkshire (covering the area South of Bracknell and around Sandhurst)
- South East Berkshire (covering North Bracknell and Ascot)
- Taceham Hundred (based around Thatcham; Taceham being the medieval corruption of the name).
- Windsor and Eton
- Wokingham

Members of Royal Berkshire resting whilst walking in Slovenia

The district map has been redrawn several times through the county's history: the latest change, at the end of 2005, was to merge the district of East Reading into its two neighbours, Reading Central and Loddon. Some aspects of Scouts are run cross-District, especially in the over-14 sections of Explorer Scouts and Scout Network. The 1st Reading (YMCA) Sea Scout Group is notable within the county as one of the founding troops of 1908.

There are also some county level organisations such as a mountaineering team and climbing, archery and shooting units to lead these activities with scouts from the county. Scouts from the county are involved in a number of international expeditions and residential trips each year. Between 2016 and 2018, Scouts from the county visited thirteen countries including the Netherlands, Belgium, Germany, Ireland and Norway. These have included visits to Kandersteg International Scout Centre in Switzerland and Explorer Belt expeditions to Finland, Hungary and Iceland.

The county's badge, worn on the uniform of each member in the county, depicts a stag and an oak tree on a dark green background. It is a variation of a traditional design for the county, originally based on a 17th-century poem, which is currently used as the flag of Berkshire.

==== WINGS ====
WINGS is a major event, open to all Scouts and Guides aged 10 to 25 in all parts of the world, and is normally held approximately every 5 years in the county. It is a collaboration between Berkshire Scouts and Girlguiding Royal Berkshire as a week long international camping experience. Participants camp in Windsor Great Park, where many of the activities also take place, although other nearby sites are also made use of, such as Dorneywood Scout Camp and Wraysbury Lake.

It has taken place in 1993, 1998, 2003, 2009 (with a theme of Making a difference) and 2014 growing from 2,700 participants from 22 countries in 1993 to 7,000 from 41 countries in 2014. The 2020 event was delayed a year to 2021 due to the COVID-19 pandemic.

==== Three Towers Hike ====
Organised by Reading Central District Scouts in Royal Berkshire, the Three Towers Hike is a competition hike held around Easter following routes through West Berkshire and South Oxfordshire. Walking is primarily along the Ridgeway, although it does not take in the full distance. The event takes its name from the three water towers passed on the main route and is open in three classes to participants within and outside of Scouting.

=== Buckinghamshire Scout County ===
Buckinghamshire Scout County is coterminous with the political county of Buckinghamshire. The county includes the towns of Aylesbury, Buckingham, High Wycombe, Marlow, and Milton Keynes. Led by County Commissioner James Williamson, and an executive team of seven volunteers, the county is currently divided into ten Scout Districts:

- Aylesbury
- Buckingham and Winslow
- Chiltern North (settlements north of High Wycombe, including Chesham)
- Chiltern Vale (settlements north west of High Wycombe, including Princes Risborough and groups in the Thame valley)
- High Wycombe
- Marlow
- Milton Keynes
- Misbourne Valley
- Vale of Aylesbury
- Woodlands (covering groups in Beaconsfield and the countryside around Maidenhead and Slough)

The 1st Wolverton Scout Group in Milton Keynes is notable as being one of the first Scout groups in the UK, being recorded on the list of initial troops in 1908.

The county's badge which is worn on the uniform of any scout in the county, shows a swan, chained and with wings out, on a black and red background surrounded by a border and on a black badge. It is based on the ancient flag of Buckinghamshire.

==== Bucks Scout Radio ====
Bucks Scout Radio, sometimes shortened to BSR, is a volunteer-run radio station broadcasting online to Scout groups in Buckinghamshire and further afield. It has a programme made up of different genres and music moods as well as original programming by Scout volunteers. It initially started in 2015 as MK Scout Radio based in Milton Keynes before being re-launched in February 2018 with the support of the county to become Bucks Scout Radio and appealing to a wider audience. They also report on Scouting News from their area, publishing it on their website and social media feeds.

During the COVID-19 pandemic and subsequent restriction in Scout activities, Bucks Scout Radio broadcast a series of programmes aimed at providing activities for young people to complete at home. This included broadcasting a County wide Camp at Home in June 2020 with young people sharing their experiences and calling in to the radio station during the event.

=== East Sussex Scout County ===
East Sussex Scout County is concurrent with the political county of East Sussex and the city of Brighton and Hove. In addition to Brighton and Hove, the County includes the coastal towns of Eastbourne and Hastings and the towns of Crowborough, Hailsham and Lewes. The county is led by the County Commissioner Elaine Gausden, the trustee board and a number of county level volunteers. East Sussex Scout County is divided into eight districts:

- Ashdown (named for the forest of the same name, centring on Crowborough and Uckfield and including groups in the High Weald AONB.)
- Brighton and Hove (a fully urban district)
- Eastbourne and District (covering Eastbourne and Polegate)
- Hailsham and Heathfield
- Hastings, Rye and District (including three groups in High Weald AONB)
- Lewes
- Seahaven
- Senlac (named for Senlac Hill and including the High Weald AONB around Battle and the coastal town of Bexhill-on-Sea)

The Brighton and Hove district in particular has early history with the first troop at Cottesmore School recorded in November 1907 and a February 1910 inspection by the Chief Scout, Robert Baden-Powell having taken place at Preston Park attended by 400 Scouts. Also notable are the 1st Ewhurst Scout Troop who held their inaugural meeting on the lawn of Robert and Olave Baden-Powell's home, Ewhurst Place, on 21 June 1913. The troop had strong links to the founder and his family with Olave acting as the Troop's Scoutmaster with the Assistant Scoutmasters being Annie Court, housemaid to the Baden-Powells, and the gardener. At the opening meeting, they used the Union Flag that had flown over Mafeking during the siege of 1889-90.

The county continue to offer events and support to sections across the county and practical support through the running of Broadstone Warren activity site. The county also run international expeditions, such as the expeditions to the regions around Cologne and Rotterdam in 2018 for the Explorer Belt.

The county's badge which is worn as part of the uniform for members in East Sussex is based on the coat of arms of East Sussex County Council on a grey background. It includes six gold martlet birds, a long symbol of Sussex, along with a white wavy line for the sea and a gold Saxon crown, linked to the translation of Sussex and 'land of the South Saxons'.

=== Hampshire Scout County ===
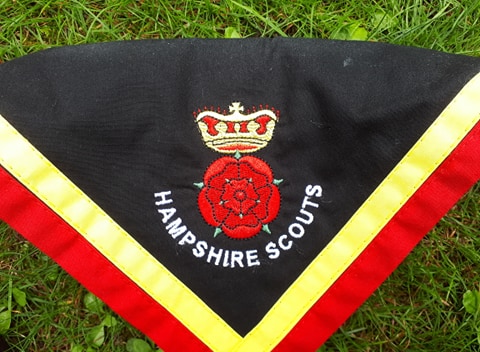
A scout neckerchief of Hampshire Scouts showing a double red rose and gold crown

Hampshire Scout County is concurrent with the ceremonial county of Hampshire and includes the cities of Southampton, Portsmouth and Winchester and the towns of Basingstoke, Eastleigh, Gosport and Farnborough. As of the January 2020 census, the county has 18,599 young people and 7,405 adult volunteers making it the largest Scout County by membership in England.

The county is run by a team of volunteers with roles for developing the youth programme, adult support and providing governance and oversight. Moreover, Hampshire Scouts use paid employees for different projects and roles including administrative staff, growth and development officers, support assistants as part of a Carers in Scouting project and a number of paid instructors and staff who run the county activity centre, Ferny Crofts.

In addition to running Ferny Crofts, the county also have a number of County run activity clubs to develop these skills in Scouts and adults; these include a mountaineering team, archery club, rifle shooting club, caving club, a club training in bushcraft and survival skills (Pro-badge) and Hampshire Scout Expeditions. The county is led by a volunteer county commissioner who is at present Commander Martin Mackey RN who was appointed in September 2017.

Hampshire is currently divided into 23 districts:

- Andover
- Basingstoke East
- Basingstoke West
- Blackwater Valley (named for the conurbation of settlements linked together by the River Blackwater)
- Bramshill (named for the Bramshill SSSI and plantation at the centre of the district. It includes the towns of Hook and Yateley.)
- Chandler's Ford
- City of Portsmouth
- Denewulf (Covers central Fareham, Portchester and the wider Meon Valley. Named for a ninth Century bishop who had ties to both Portchester and Bishop's Waltham.)
- Eastleigh
- Fareham West (Covers all settlements between Fareham and the River Hamble to the West including Stubbington and Locks Heath.)
- Gosport
- Havant (Covers all of the borough East of the A3(M)).
- Itchen (Suburbs of Southampton and Eastleigh between the Rivers Itchen and Hamble. Includes Hedge End, West End, Bitterne and Thornhill.)
- New Forest (Includes Totton and Eling, Lyndhurst, Ringwood and Fordingbridge)
- New Forest Solent (Comprises the Southern and Eastern section of the New Forest National Park including Hythe, Marchwood, Lymington, New Milton and Brockenhurst.)
- Odiham (Includes the nearby town of Fleet)
- Petersfield (Includes a large area around the town as far North as Liphook and West as West Meon.)
- Romsey (Includes villages surrounding the historic market town of Romsey.)
- Rotherfield (There is no place called Rotherfield in the district; includes Alton, Alresford and Bordon.)
- Southampton City (Consists of parts of the City of Southampton between the River Test and River Itchen.)
- Waterlooville
- Winchester

The districts within the county have changed many times during the century it has existed with 64 different districts having existed since 1909. Seven of the present districts retain the same name from their foundation and largely retain the core of their groups (some may have been lost of other districts as boundaries change), those seven being Andover, Eastleigh, Gosport, Havant, Odiham, Petersfield and Romsey.

Hampshire Scouts was founded in January 1909 to lead the development of Scouts in the county with the first county commissioner being chosen at this time. Three years later on 2 October 1912 the Chief Scout, Robert Baden-Powell, and fiancé Olave St. Clare Soames attended the first-ever Hampshire County Rally on Southampton Common and inspected 2,700 Scouts. This event was captured on film, is currently held in the Hampshire Archives and Local Studies centre as part of the Wessex Film and Sound Archive and has been digitised and available on YouTube. Baden-Powell would visit the county to visit Scouts on a number of occasions including inspecting troops in Winchester, Portsmouth, Andover, Petersfield and Basingstoke in 1916, Southampton in 1927, Aldershot in 1930 and Lymington in 1935.

Hampshire Scout groups have been involved in new developments in Scouting since the beginning of the movement in 1907. The 1st Lymington Scout troop is recorded as beginning in late 1907 and launching in early 1908 and 1st Romsey Scout troop is among an official list of troops who were established in 1908. The Sea Scout branch that focused on water based activities got its start in Hampshire when the Training Ship Mercury hosted the third camp by Chief Scout Robert Baden-Powell with a focus on water based instruction at Buckler's Hard on the Beaulieu River. Scouts from this camp would go on to form the first Sea Scout troops including the 6th Itchen (Hamble) Sea Scout Group which was registered on 10 July 1910 and believed to be the first in the country. Bertram Sackville Thesiger was the county commissioner at this time. In July 1942, Avington Park in Itchen Abbas, Hampshire hosted the first national Air Scout camp, only 18 months after the section's launch on 31 January 1941. The Scout Association used Lasham Airfield, near Alton, as their only Air Activity Centre until 1978. More recently groups in Hampshire, such as 2nd New Forest North (Stanley's Own), were among these who trialed Beavers in 1982, four years before its official launch as the fourth section and in 2019 the 13th Southampton group became one of the pilot locations for a new section for early years (provisionally called Hedgehogs).

The county periodically runs whole-County camps to allow networking and large scale activities to occur. Recent events include H007, at New Park, Brockenhurst in 2007 on the site normally occupied by the New Forest Show, H0014 in 2014 and H0018 in 2018 both at Buddens Scout Adventures. The county also run international trips throughout the year with regular annual Explorer Belt expeditions to various European countries, visits to Kandersteg International Scout Centre in Switzerland approximately every 3–4 years, participation in larger-scale events such as Jamborees and Moot and community based expeditions to Tanzania and The Gambia (the former of which is now organised for the benefit of Scouts across the UK and the latter is organised by a county Scout Active Support unit with links to the Kairo Konko Scout Centre.)

The uniform badge used by the county is a double red rose with a gold crown above on a black background. Since 2018, the same design and rose has been adapted for use on the neckers worn by county-level volunteers with the colours of black, gold and red used. The rose and crown has long been a symbol of Hampshire but there is much variation, especially on the type of rose with the recently adopted Flag of Hampshire and Hampshire County Council's logo and corporate flag both using a Tudor rose while the coat of arms and official flag of Hampshire County Council both using a double red rose. When being created, Hampshire Scouts based their design on that of the Hampshire Lawn Tennis Association and so adopted the double red rose. However the Hampshire Scouts logo, used up until 2018, instead featured a Tudor rose. Since 2018 however Hampshire Scouts have used a logo following the Scouts corporate style and where the rose is used on uniform items it is consistently the double red rose.

==== Hampshire Scout Expeditions ====
Hampshire Scout Expeditions, frequently shortened to HSX is a Scout Active Support unit in Hampshire that specialises in running international expeditions for Scouts within Hampshire including Explorer Scouts, Scout Network and adult volunteers. The group was founded in 1986 and runs expeditions, often lasting between 4–6 weeks, in countries around the world – often in developing countries. These expeditions are preceded by a number of training weekends beforehand in various challenging areas of the UK, such as the Lake District, Cairngorms and Snowdonia, and taking part in adventurous activities. The group also maintain a supply of technical kit required for these events which is available to members to use.

HSX and their members are also notable for a series of high-profile expeditions. Between 2003 and 2006, HSX member and Hampshire Scout leader Rhys Jones succeeded in climbing the seven highest mountains on all seven continents and in doing so became the youngest person to do so. The first summit was Mount McKinley (subsequently renamed Denali), the highest mountain in North America, which he tackled when he was 17 with a team from HSX. This was followed by Mount Kilimanjaro (Africa), Aconcagua (South America), Mount Elbrus (Europe), Mount Kosciuszko (Australia), Mount Vinson (Antarctica) and concluding with Mount Everest on 17 May 2006, his 20th birthday. Jones, and his wife Laura who completed long-distance runs, are both Scout Adventurers.

In 2007, a team of HSX members formed the Sky High team which climbed Mount Everest. The team consisted of Nathan Figg, Tim Clark, James Fry, David King, Andy Smith, Russ Parke and Jeremy White with Clark, Fry and King reaching the top on 21 May 2007. Parke, the Expedition leader, had been planning the expedition since 1998 and chose 2007 due to the centenary of Scouting. The expedition also included Explorer Scouts from Hampshire, who joined the team as far as the Everest base camp before joining community projects in the country, and Chief Scout Peter Duncan who joined them for part of the journey.

In January 2019, Hampshire Scout and HSX member Joe Doherty completed an expedition in Antarctica, skiing to the South Pole and kite skiing back. It was the first HSX organised trip to Antarctica and originally featured a larger Scout team until various circumstances required the dropping out of the other members. The expedition included a route skiing from the Messner start to the South Pole before kite skiing back to Hercules Inlet. Doherty and HSX marked the expedition beforehand through a special badge gained by groups and Scouts and afterwards with visits to young people to discuss the adventure with them. This included an online webinar recorded during the COVID-19 pandemic in July 2020. Doherty has been very open about the challenge of the expedition including the toll on his mental health during and after the expedition. Doherty is a Hampshire Scout ambassador and a national Scout Adventurer.

=== Isle of Wight Scout County ===
The Isle of Wight Scout County is the local organisation in charge of Scout groups on the Isle of Wight, off the South coast in the English Channel. Until January 2020, the island was split into two districts (East Wight and West Wight) however these were combined with the county taking on the responsibilities normally administered by the districts. On the island, there are 23 Scout groups, 11 Explorer Scout units and one Scout Network. Three groups on the island are listed as starting in 1908: the 1st Newport, 1st Sandown and 1st Shanklin. The county is led by the county commissioner, currently Dave Simpson, a team of three assistants and a trustee board that manages the governance of the charity.

The uniform badge of the island features a sky blue shield on a pale grey background. The shield contains three golden anchors in the corners and has a pale grey castle with three towers in the centre. It is based on the shield that is part of the coat of arms of the Isle of Wight Council; the blue colour and anchors representing the island's link to the sea while the castle represents Carisbrooke Castle (with its twin towered gatehouse and motte tower keep) which is the historical seat of the Governor of the Isle of Wight.

A notable event hosted by Isle of Wight Scouts is Revolution, an event for Explorer Scouts and Scout Network open to members from across the UK and focusing on themed activities.

=== Kent Scout County ===
County badge as worn on the uniform of Scouting members in Kent

Kent Scout County is a Scout County of the Scout Association in the United Kingdom, covering the county of Kent and the Kent County Council and Medway Council areas. The county is run by a team of volunteers in various teams, led by County Lead Volunteer Nirav Patel. In 2019, Kent Scouts also employed 16 people in administrative, growth and activity roles. It is divided into 21 Scout Districts, and as part of merger plans for Project Re-Draw, this is will see the number of Districts reduce to become larger better supported Districts. In 2026, we saw the merger of Deal, Walmer, Sandwich & District with Dover District to become Deal and Dover, and an anticipated merge at the end of the year will see Royal Tunbridge Wells District and Weald District merge to become Royal Tunbridge Wells and Weald:

- Ashford
- Canterbury, Whitstable and Herne Bay
- Dartford
- Deal and Dover
- Faversham
- Folkestone and Hythe
- Gillingham
- Gravesham
- Isle of Sheppey
- Maidstone East
- Maidstone West
- Malling (The area around the historic market town of West Malling.)
- Medway Towns
- Romney Marsh
- Sevenoaks
- Sittingbourne, Milton and District
- Swanley
- Thanet
- Tonbridge
- Royal Tunbridge Wells
- Weald (Covering the Kent area of the Weald and the Kent High Weald AONB between Royal Tunbridge Wells and Ashford.)

Kent Scout county has over 23,000 members, of which around 17,000 are young people, and run several county level activity teams centres around water activities, land activities and specialist themes such as mountaineering. The latter is named the Invicta Mountaineering Club, after the motto of the county, and has been running since 1965 as a club for leaders and older members of the Scout and Guide movements with regular expeditions that any can attend. The 1st Hythe and 1st Tonbridge Scout Groups are notable as being among the first Scout groups in the UK, being recorded on the list of initial troops in 1908.

The uniform badge for the county features the ancient symbol of Kent, the White Horse of Kent against a deep red background. This symbol is well known within Kent and has featured as the County flag since 1605. The rampant horse also features as part of the logo for Kent Scouts being used in recent years primarily for internal communications.

==== Kent International Jamboree ====
Every four years, Kent International Jamboree, or KIJ, is run by the county. It brings people from all over the world to Kent to experience Kentish Life and adventurous activities. KIJ 2021 was postponed due to the COVID-19 pandemic, becoming KIJ 2022. It was held at the Kent County Showground near Detling. 3,500 Scouts and Guides camped together for a week during the 2022 jamboree. The next KIJ will be in 2025, as per the pre-pandemic timetable.

=== Oxfordshire Scout County ===
Oxfordshire Scout County covers all groups of the Scout Association within the county of Oxfordshire, and is divided into six districts:

- King Alfred (Covers the Vale of White Horse area, north of the River Thames and south of The Ridgeway ancient track. The district headquarters are in Wantage, known as the birthplace of Anglo-Saxon king Alfred the Great for which the district is named.)
- North Oxfordshire (covering the north of the county and including some of the Cherwell and West Oxfordshire council districts.)
- Oxford Spires (covering groups within about 5 km (3 miles) of the city of Oxford and a group in Thame. The name refers to the medieval spires belonging to the churches and colleges of the city.)
- Thames Chiltern (so named because the majority of groups are either based around the River Thames at Wallingford or in the Chiltern Hills AONB.)
- Thames Ridge (named for the fact that many groups are either based around the River Thames at Abingdon-on-Thames or around Didcot near the Ridgeway ancient trail. Also includes groups located South West outside of central Oxford.)
- West Oxfordshire (covering the communities to the west of Oxford.)

The county is run by a team of volunteers, led by County Commissioner Wendy Tatham and supported by seven deputies covering different aspects of their operation. The county also has two Youth Commissioners, to represent young people within the county, and a board of trustees. The county is supported three paid staff members covering administration, growth and funding.

The county runs a number of county level organisations including OxChefs, Event Fairies and First Aid Scout Active Support units, supporting leaders with teaching cooking skills, event management and first aid respectively. The county has just short of 10,000 members with 7,300 being Scouts as of 2019. The 1st Henley-on-Thames Scout Group is listed among the first Scout groups in the UK from the 1908 list.

The uniform badge used by members in the county is based on the Flag of Oxfordshire in a shield shape and on a black background with the name underneath in a banner. Some of the symbology in the badge, mirroring the flag, includes a red Ox head on the wavy lines of the River Thames, alluding to the city of Oxford itself, and a golden oak tree and wheat sheaf alluding to the agriculture and woodland in the county.

=== Surrey Scout County ===
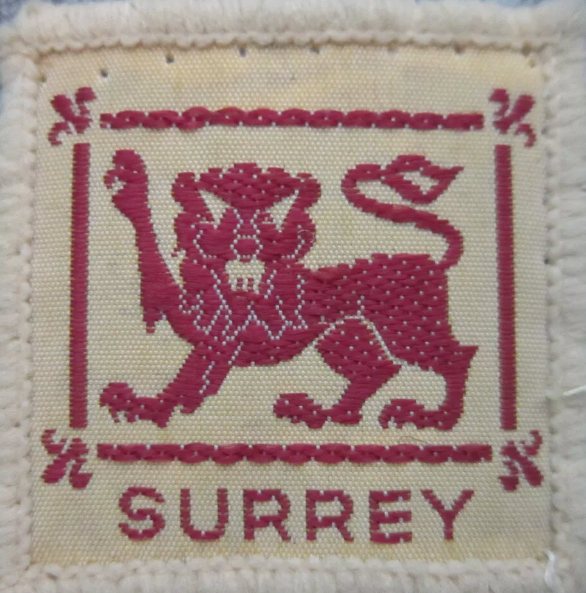
County badge as worn on the uniform of Scouting members in Surrey

Surrey Scout County is the Scout Association county concurrent with the political county of Surrey and consists of approximately 17,000 members including 13,657 young people. It is led by a volunteer county commissioner and supported by a team of eight deputies and ten assistants; the current county commissioner is Joe Rogerson., The county is divided into 18 districts.

- Banstead
- Caterham
- Dorking (covering the town and South East to Charlwood.)
- East Surrey (Six rural groups in the South Eastern corner of the County)
- Epsom and Ewell (covering the borough of the same name)
- Esher (Named after the large town at the geographical centre of the district. Scout groups are clustered around Molesey, Thames Ditton and Cobham. There is no group in Esher itself.)
- Farnham
- Godalming
- Guildford East (covering all areas of Guildford East of the River Wey.)
- Guildford West (covering all areas of Guildford West of the River Wey.)
- Haslemere & District
- Leatherhead
- Reigate (covering the groups around the towns of Reigate, Redhill and Horley.)
- Runnymede (covers an area concurrent with the Borough of Runnymede.)
- Spelthorne (covers an area concurrent with the Borough of Spelthorne.)
- Surrey Heath & District (covers an area concurrent with the Surrey Heath borough district.)
- Walton and Weybridge
- Woking

The 4th Woking (Christchurch) and 1st Weybridge (Brookland's Own) both appear on the 1908 list of registered Scout groups and are therefore among the oldest in the county. The 1st Weybridge boast a start date of 1907 and claim the title of the oldest Scout group in the county.

The Surrey County is part represented through the use of a lion image; the uniform badge for the county consists of a red lion passant in a red square with fleur-de-lis in the corners on a light background, and the Scout County makes used of a stylised lion in profile to represent its teams. The lion passant appears in a number of coat of arms of the Earls of Surrey and is also used by other organisations in the county including Girlguiding and Surrey County Bowling Association.

Surrey Scouts run a series of progressive activity days and events for its members and those of Girlguiding. Bazzaz is a triennial activity fun day for Beaver Scouts and Rainbows in Surrey and consists of activities including climbing, inflatables and obstacle courses. SCRAM (short for Surrey Cubs Run Amok) is a triennial activity fun day for 2,500 Cub Scouts and centres around 150 activities including quad bikes, zip wire, bungee running and zorbing. Scoutabout is a triennial activity weekend that hosts over 4500 Scouts and Guides with over 200 different activities. Each of the three triennial events are times so that only one big event happens each year. The most recent launched activity is the annual FrightEX24, a halloween-themed 24-hour activity camp, which was launched in 2018 and ran in 2019. Other events run by the county include KIX, an expedition of Scouts to Kandersteg International Scout Centre, and Beavers Go Wild, an annual weekend event for Beaver Scouts.

=== West Sussex Scout County ===
West Sussex Scout County is the Scout Association county concurrent with the political county of West Sussex and is divided into 10 Scout Districts:

- Adur Valley
- Arundel & Littlehampton
- Bognor Regis
- Chichester
- Crawley
- East Grinstead
- Horsham
- Mid Sussex
- Petworth & Pulborough
- Worthing

The 1st Arundel (Earl of Arundel's Own) and 4th Worth both appear on the 1908 list of registered Scout groups and are therefore among the oldest in the county.

The uniform badge for the county is based on a simplified version of the coat of arms granted to West Sussex County Council in 1975. It features a blue shield with a thick gold band at the top and six gold birds, arranged in an inverted triangle, on it. Atop the shield is a Saxon crown with acorns in between the three prongs all on a white background.

== Student Scout and Guide Organisation ==
In the South East of England, there are student associations at various universities affiliated to the Student Scout and Guide Organisation (SSAGO). These are located at Canterbury Christ Church University, the University of Kent and Universities at Medway (GreKSAG), Oxford University and Oxford Brookes University (OUSGG), the University of Portsmouth (PUGS), Royal Holloway, University of London (RHUL SSAGO), Solent University (Solent SSAGO), and the University of Southampton (Southampton SSAGO).

SSAGO clubs previously existed at the University of Reading, the University of Surrey, University of Sussex and University of Brighton (BSGS) and the University of Winchester.

Oxford University Scout and Guide Group is the oldest University Scouting club in the United Kingdom having been founded in November 1919.

== Campsites ==
=== Royal Berkshire ===
There are three campsites within the county. Earleywood is the largest facility, while the other two (Paddicks Patch, based in Loddon District and just outside the town of Woodley, and the 1st Burghfield & Sulhamstead Scout HQ, in the village of Burghfield and part of Pang Valley District) offer a single pitch with a fire-circle and a nearby hut.

All three campsites are available to all members of the Scout Association for activities.

==== Earleywood ====
Earleywood Camping and Scout Centre in South Ascot is a camping and activity centre run jointly by South Berkshire and South East Berkshire Scout Districts of The Scout Association. Offering two accommodation buildings, a climbing tower, bouldering wall and crate stacking it is also the county centre for Royal Berkshire Scouts. It was owned by the Scout Association outright but was operated by the two districts from the 1980s until the Scout Association sold the site off to the two districts c.2004.

=== Buckinghamshire ===
==== Braidwood ====
Braidwood Scout and Guide Activity Centre in the Chiltern Hills is owned and run by Buckinghamshire Scout County. Over its 14 acres, it offers camping, two buildings and outdoor activities for visiting Scout and Guide groups.

==== Longridge ====
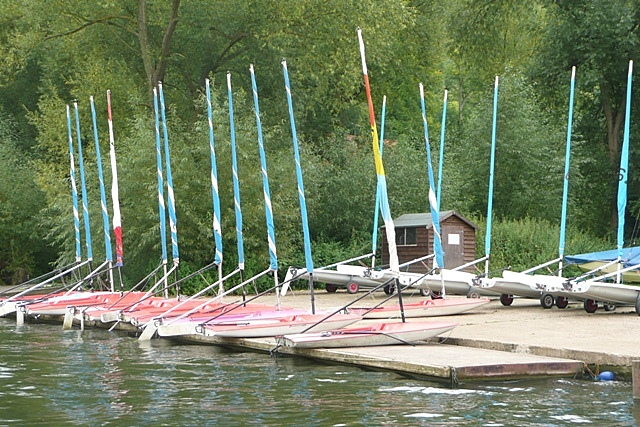
Boats at Longridge Activity Centre

Longridge Activity Centre was previously owned by The Scout Association but sold to an independent charity in 2007, to be run for the benefit for all young people. The centre now offers a range of water and land activities from its 12-acre site on the River Thames near Marlow in Buckinghamshire. With help from Sport England the centre built a new Training Centre in 2010 which provides large indoor spaces and in addition offers a range of indoor accommodation and camping as well as a Cafe providing a range of refreshments. The centre provides water activities such as Bell Boating, Dragon boat, Canoeing, Rowing, Sailing, Kayaking and Powerboating. It also offers land based activities including Climbing, Team Challenge Zones, Water Orbs, Go Karts and Disc golf.

The centre has a very good safety record and is now recognised as being a leading training centre for young people and their leaders. It as an approved British Canoe Union centre and RYA (Royal Yacht Association) training centre. Each year the team at Longridge run a large number of courses ranging from basic beginner skills right through to advanced coaching and instruction.

Longridge works in partnership with a number of other providers to improve community sport, such as Marlow Rowing Club, local schools, youth groups and other charities, such as The Rivertime Boat Trust that provides activities for young people with disabilities. Patrons include Steve Backshall, TV adventurer and naturalist.

Activities at Longridge are primarily aimed at young people, however when young people are not using the site, it is open to families and adult users. The Fire Service, GB Canoeing and GB Women's Rowing Team both train at the site, as well as the Men and Women's GB Dragon Boat Teams. In addition they encourage local businesses to use the site for team development days.

==== Paccar ====
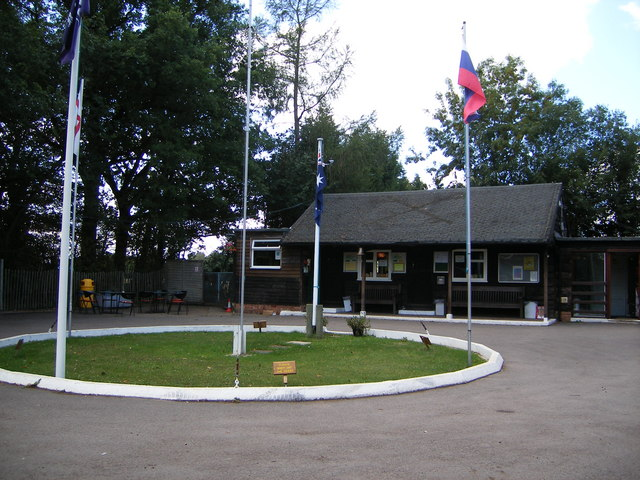
Paccar Scout Camp

Paccar Scout Camp is situated on the ridge between Chalfont St. Peter and the River Colne in the Buckinghamshire countryside. Set in its own woodland, it offers both outdoor and indoor accommodation, an indoor air rifle range, outdoor archery range and climbing walls. Originally opened in 1938 when the camp was purchased by The Scout Association after an anonymous donation of money, it was operated by Scout Headquarters as a base for Scouts to camp before being leased to Greater London Middlesex West Scout County. It was sold off by The Scout Association to the county c.2004 as part of the National Centres of Excellence scheme.

==== The Quarries ====
The Quarries Camping and Activity Centre, located in Buckinghamshire, is owned and operated by Milton Keynes District Scouts. It is located near the village of Cosgrove on the northern edge of Milton Keynes. As well as a range of camping sites and indoor accommodation there is an indoor air rifle range, outdoor archery range and Scoutcraft activities. In addition to Scouting activities, the Quarries also hosts many Girl Guiding camps and school parties during Duke of Edinburgh Award expeditions.

=== East Sussex ===
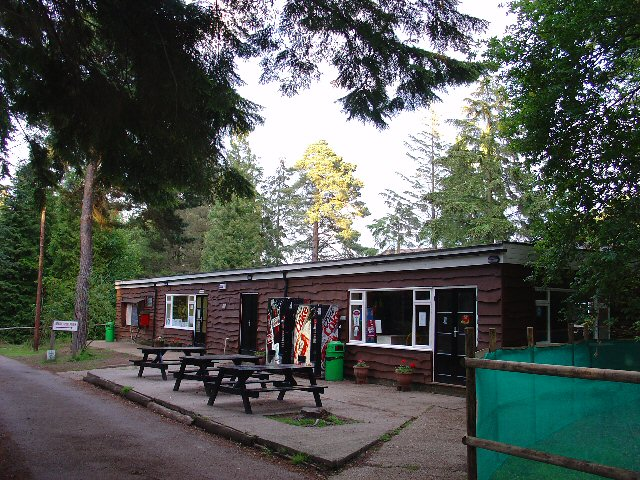
Shop and East Sussex County Hq at Broadstone Warren

The county contains four Scout campsites; Broadstone Warren, where the HQ of the county is located, Bushy Wood in Hailsham, Parkwood in Brighton and run by the local district and Kiteye in Bexhill-on-Sea run by the Senlac District.

==== Broadstone Warren ====
Broadstone Warren Scout Site & Activity Centre is a 400-acre woodland camping and activity centre located at the heart of the Ashdown Forest in East Sussex and is open all year round. It has been in operation since 1937 and is owned directly by the Scout Association. It has been operated by East Sussex County Scouts since 1986 when it was leased from The Scout Association and was sold to them c.2004. Following the coronavirus pandemic of 2020, which forced the closure of the site for many months, the site was returned to the Scout Association who added it as a Scout Adventure centre in the summer of 2021. On-site facilities include archery ranges, indoor accommodation, large tented village, a climbing tower, tomahawk ranges, pedal carts, a tunnel network, high and low ropes courses and a 140 m zip wire.

==== Bushy Wood ====
Bushy Wood Activity Centre is an activity centre for youth groups that is located in Hailsham, North of Eastbourne. It is run by Eastbourne Scout District, however the activities available on site are provided by Buzz Active, a non-profit organisation owned by East Sussex County Council. It has two accommodation buildings and two additional meeting and training centres as well as camping on site.

=== Hampshire ===
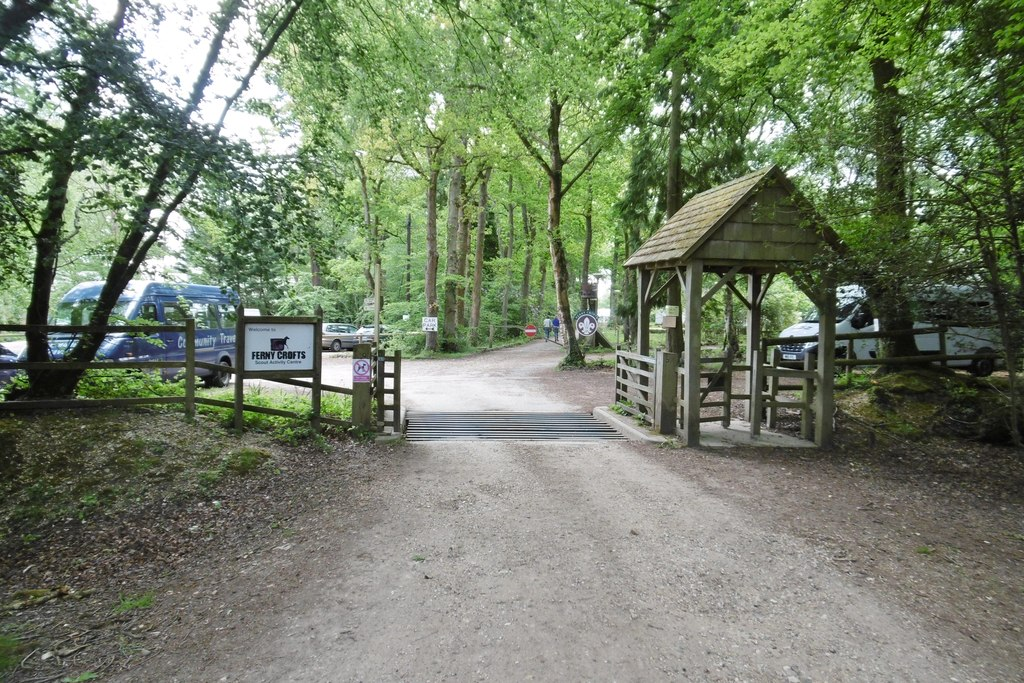
The entrance to Ferny Crofts Scout Activity Centre, the Scout Centre run by Hampshire Scouts

There are a number of camp sites in Hampshire that are owned or open to Scouts from across the country. Notable centres include Ferny Crofts in the New Forest, the Scout centre for Hampshire Scouts and also acts as the Scout County's headquarters, Lyon's Copse in Shedfield which serves the districts in the South East of Hampshire and Runway's End in Farnborough which is run by Hampshire County Council in partnership with Blackwater Valley Scouts and Rushmoor Borough Council. Other sites include Cranbury Park, part of the estate of the same name and run by Chandler's Ford Scout district; Cricket Camp, located within River Hamble Country Park and run by Itchen Scout district; Harry's Island in Burley, the New Forest, which is run by New Forest West Scout district; Pinsent Scout Campsite in Winchester and run by Winchester Scout district and Wilverley Campsite which is in the New Forest and run by Southampton City Scout district. The Girlguiding owned and run Foxlease Training and Activity Centre in Lyndhurst, New Forest and Sandy Acres Campsite in Shedfield, run by Girlguiding Hampshire East are also available for Scouts to use.

==== Ferny Crofts ====
Ferny Crofts Scout Activity Centre, in the New Forest near Beaulieu, is owned and operated by Hampshire Scouts. It provides camping facilities plus indoor accommodation through two lodges and offers adventurous activities including climbing, high ropes, target based activities, water activities and bushcraft. Between 2009 and 2016, Ferny Crofts was a part of the National Scout Activity Centre as a partner centre. This allowed the site to benefit from joint training, marketing and common strategy but continued throughout to be owned by Hampshire Scouts and run by Hampshire Scouts staff.

==== Lyon's Copse ====
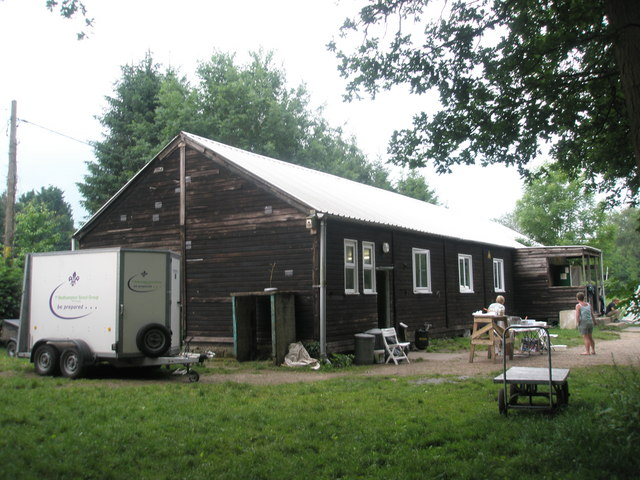
The Pine Cabin at Lyon's Copse

The Solent Scout Training Centre, commonly known as Lyon's Copse is a scout activity centre in Shedfield, South East Hampshire. It is owned by five districts that surround the site; Fareham East, Fareham West, Gosport, Meon Valley and City of Portsmouth. It was originally acquired in 1971 by the then five districts of Bishop's Waltham, Fareham, Hilsea, Portsdown and Southsea with Gosport joining in 1979.

The site contains four accommodation buildings; the flagship Lyon's Lodge, the older Pine Cabin and two Log Cabins. Opening in 1996, Lyon's Lodge contains extensive dormitories on the first floor with communal space, accessible bedrooms and facilities on the ground floor. Its opening was marked by a visit from the Chief Scout George Purdy and the Scouts' President the Duke of Kent. In addition the site has a climbing tower, low ropes course, indoor archery and rifle shooting range, bouldering wall and small pond for rafting.

=== Isle of Wight ===
The island contains two main scout campsites, Corf Scout Camp, near Shalfleet and South Wight Campsite near Ventnor. The South Wight Campsite is run by the 3rd Ventnor Scout Group and contains simple facilities.

Corf is a 22-acre site for the Isle of Wight county and is owned and run by the county. It is a largely wooded site and contains 30 small numbered sites located either within the woodland or in small fields among the trees and bordered on two sides by lakes therefore permitting water activities. The site centres on a number of buildings, primarily used for interior activity space, lecture rooms and one indoor accommodation centre. It also has a climbing tower, bird hide, adventure course and play area. Purchased in 1937 for £300, the site is also a Site of Special Scientific Interest and contains a significant amount of ancient woodland.

=== Kent ===
The County of Kent has a number of different campsites, many owned and run by the different districts within the county. These are:

- Adamswell Scout Campsite near Royal Tunbridge Wells is a 15-acre basic site owned by Tunbridge Wells Scout District.
- Bexon Lane Campsite near Bredgar is the owned by Sittingbourne, Milton & District Scout District and contains camping fields and an activity building.
- Farningham Wood in Swanley Village is a 10-acre campsite owned by the Swanley Scout District and consists of a simple campsite with toilets. It is a Site of Special Scientific Interest.
- Hamlet Wood near Maidstone is a 27-acre site jointly owned by both Maidstone Scout Districts. In addition to camping, it has two buildings including accommodation and a climbing tower.
- Hopehill Campsite, Meopham, is owned by Gravesham Scout District and has camping, accommodation buildings and a climbing tower on a 20-acre site.
- Lordship Wood near Horsmonden, Tunbridge Wells, is owned by Weald Scout District in the High Weald AONB. It has 23 acres of ancient woodland and 2 acres of open land and is without campsite facilities; it is designated for traditional greenfield camping for Scouts.
- Marshside Scout Camp near Minster-in-Thanet is owned by Thanet Scout District and consists of a camping area and activities such as target activities and climbing.
- Ross Wood Campsite near Herne Bay is owned by the Canterbury, Whitstable and Herne Bay Scout District as their campsite.
- Shepherd Park Activity Centre, near Faversham, is owned by Faversham Scout District. Plumford Road divides the site into two parts; the North Field and the South Field. The larger North Field includes an independent toilet block with showers, toilets, and washing-up facilities. The HQs of both Faversham District Scouts and the 1st Faversham (Wheler's Own) Scout Group are on the southern side of the road. Both halls share toilet and shower facilities, and each has an adjoining equipment storage room and kitchen. The south side also includes a barn used for rifle shooting, a campfire circle, and a car park.

A number of different scout groups also have access to their own campsites or have a training field attached to their Scout HQ which groups can rent for camping. Also notable is Dartford Scouts' HQ which is a house in a residential area which is used for section meetings and as a hostel and outdoor camping area. Scouts in the area also have use of Kearnsey Camp site and the Swattenden Centre owned by Kent County Council.

Downe Scout Adventures is located in Orpington which is now considered Greater London but which was long associated with Kent. It is one of the Scout Association's national Scout Adventures centres. Wilberforce Scout Centre, owned by Bromley Scouts, is similarly placed. Kent also used to be home to Kingsdown International Scout Camp, a Scout Association owned facility that was leased to Oxfordshire County Scout Council. It passed into private ownership c.2005 following the aim to create fewer national centres of excellence with a range of activities.

==== Buckmore Park ====
Buckmore Park Scout Centre is a camping and activity centre located to the south of Chatham in Kent. The site is run by the Medway Towns Scout District of the Scout Association. The site has been used by the Scouts since 1953 and included woodland and the Buckmore Park Kart Circuit, which is run separately. The site underwent significant development after the adjacent M2 motorway was widened in 1995 requiring a number of buildings to be demolished with the scouts compensated.

The new facilities, built using the compensation and £2.9 million of public money, opened in 2000 and included a swimming pool, conference centre, an air rifle range, archery butts, a sports hall, a café, accommodation, a climbing tower, a caving network, and an assault course. However, in April 2003 issues with access and falling usage led to the site being closed by the Scouts as they were unable to run it. The operating company, Buckmore Park Scout Centre Ltd, went into administration in 2004 and then faced a legal dispute with the land owner the Bridge Wardens Trust which lasted until 2007. The Scouts had to leave the site in 2005 but were able to return to a 20-acre wooded area of the site in 2007 without any buildings after a new owner was found for the facilities in 2006. The new owner themselves went into administration in 2008 and the leisure complex was bought by the Kingsway International Christian Centre in 2013. The climbing wall originally located at the centre was relocated to Lower Grange Farm, located nearby, and re-opened there in 2014 as their new climbing centre.

The site currently in use by the Scouts is a 142-acre site of predominantly woodland including ancient woodland and area designated an area of outstanding natural beauty. Activities available on site include air rifle shooting, caving, archery and orienteering. Its focus is on basics camping and has two modular buildings on site which can be used for meetings or indoor activities.

==== Lower Grange Farm ====
Lower Grange Farm is the Scout Centre for Kent Scouts, located in Maidstone. It has been in use since 2009 and contains meeting and conference facilities, accommodation, activity space, archery range, cave bus and a climbing barn. More land has been bought to expand the site to accommodate for larger events and to prevent development from encroaching on the site. The development of the site has had a strong involvement from young people with the opinions of the members of the County feeding into the vision for the site.

The site was bought in August 2009 at auction as a derelict farm and has been extensively developed in the time since. It featured on BBC One daytime show Homes Under the Hammer which covered the purchase of the property at auction and the subsequent redevelopment to make it suitable for Scouting activities. Chief Scout Bear Grylls visited the site in October 2010 to unveil a stone to mark the start of the climbing barn project initially at the consultation and funding stages. During this time, the derelict farm was being returned to use with the various buildings around the square courtyard being renovated in turn and made fit to use: the wardens accommodation in 2010, the County office in 2011, the accommodation blocks (in the old stables) in 2012, two catering kitchens in 2015 and additional meeting space in the stables block in 2018. During later years the focus moved into the wider site with construction on the climbing barn taking place between 2012 and 2014 with the official opening on the 29 June 2014. The track and car park to site were improved to ensure accessibility in 2014 and an archery range was constructed by volunteers in 2016. The vision for the site includes a new construction on front of the existing stable blocks to link these together.

=== Oxfordshire ===
Oxfordshire is the home of Youlbury Scout Adventures, a nationally owned and run Scout activity centre with over a century of history with the Scout movement. In addition to a couple of campsites attached to Scout Group meeting places, the other campsite of note in the county is Horley Scout Camp in North Oxfordshire and run by the district of the same name. It offers camping, a climbing wall, archery and shooting along with two lodge buildings, one suitable for accommodation. Part of the former Oxfordshire Ironstone Railway is included in the north of the site including the former Horley sidings.

==== Youlbury ====
Youlbury Scout Adventures is one of the twelve Scout Adventure Centres across the United Kingdom, and is located to the west of Oxford. It is owned by The Scout Association and has been operated directly by them since 2005 when it became a National Centre of Excellence. One of the oldest Scout campsites in the United Kingdom, it acted as the National Headquarters for the Scout Association when Gilwell Park was commandeered by the British Army during World War II.

=== Surrey ===
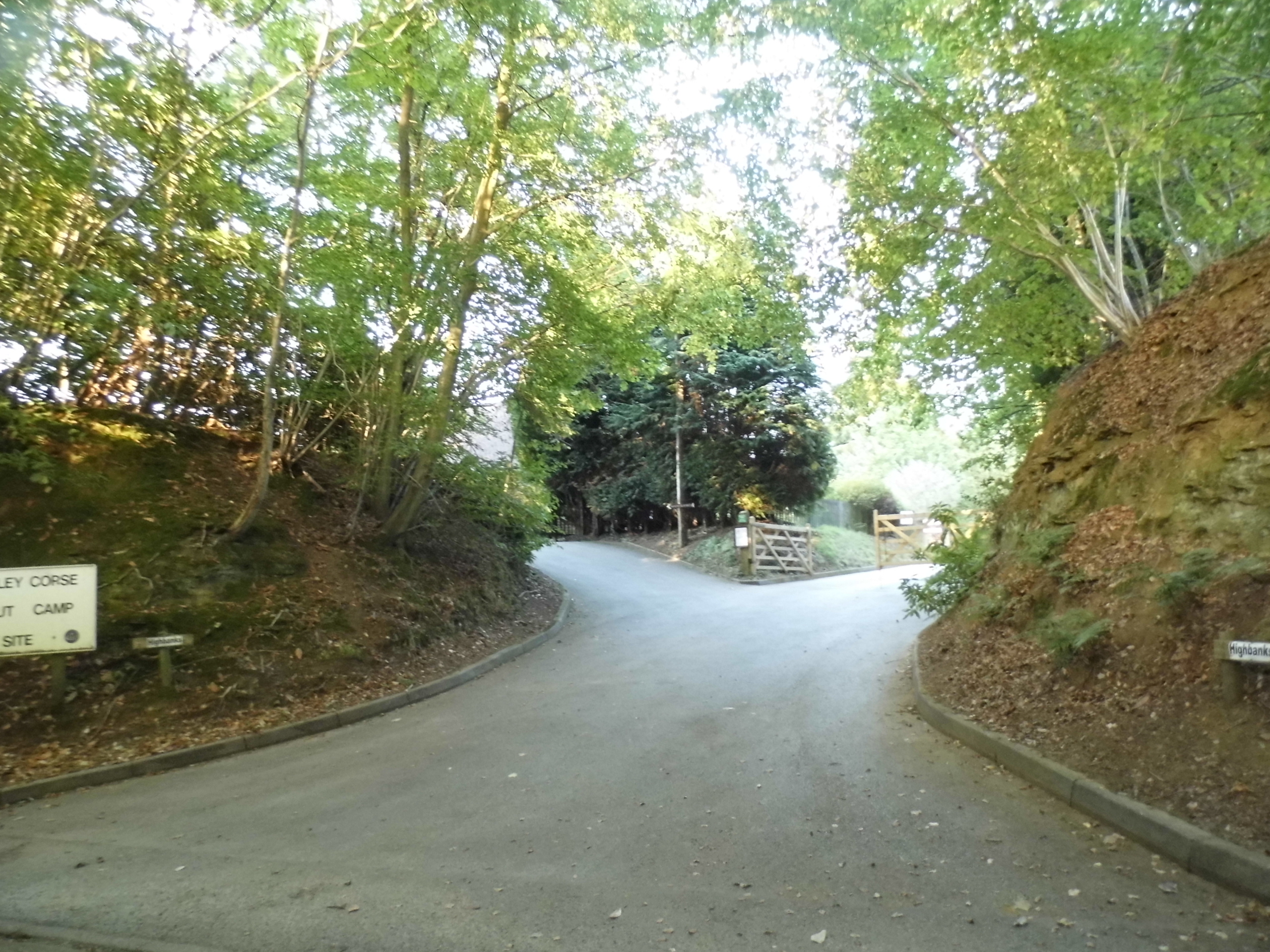
The entrance to Bentley Copse Activity Centre, the headquarters of Surrey County Scouts

Surrey has a number of campsites and activity centres within its borders. The Scout Association county's headquarters is at Bentley Copse Activity Centre and has subsequently been developed into a sizeable site and the former national Scout campsite Walton Firs is also in the county and has seen extensive updating since becoming independently owned in 2008. The county was also home to another former national Scout site, Perry Wood International Scout Campsite in Horley, a nine-acre site which was owned by the Scout Association and managed by Horley Scout district but was sold off as part of the National Centres of Excellence plan which sought to focus the nationally owned portfolio into a small number of high-quality activity centres – being a small and basic site Perry Wood was not suited to this.

Surrey has a number of smaller sites run by Scout Districts and neighbouring counties. Birchmere in Wisley, owned by Woking Scout District, is a traditional site with a focus on scouting skills and camping; it has two classrooms for indoor activities but few on-site activities. Boidier Hurst on Box Hill is jointly owned by Epsom & Ewell and Leatherhead Scout districts since the site was donated to the then Epsom and Leatherhead Local Association in October 1946. The site has 11 separate sites and one multi-purpose building and is focused on links with nature as it adjoins National Trust land. Garner's Field is the campsite owned by Farnham Scout District and is a filled in quarry acquired by the district in the 1970s near to the town in Tilford. It has a 7-acre camping field, a permanent brick centre for training or activity use and on-site activities including climbing, archery, shooting and activity trail. Jordan Heights in Reigate is owned by the National Trust and leased to the Reigate Scout District in 2011, taking over from Girlguiding Surrey East which has used the site since 1952. The small, heavily landscaped site has two camping fields on two levels, a wooden indoor building Doreen's Lodge and activities including shooting, archery, bouldering and activity course. Park Farm in Banstead is owned by the local council and leased to Banstead Scout District, who have used the site since 1954. It has a number of buildings on site with the two main ones being used including the Long Barn indoor activity building and the Round Barn, a Grade II listed building used for training, as well as a climbing wall and indoor archery and shooting ranges. Polyapes is jointly run by Esher Scout District and the neighbouring Kingston district in Greater London and has been open to camping since 1929. It has 23 acres of camping and woodland and includes two buildings, one of which has accommodation for 30 young people.

Some sites in the county are more basic such as Bourne Copse near Virginia Water which is owned by Runnymede Scout district and is a 5-acre woodland site with no activities or indoor buildings. Ranmore Campsite on the common of the same name is run by Dorking Scout district and is a basics woodland campsite with no facilities aside from water and toilets much like Roverdene Campsite in Chaldon run by the Caterham Scout district. White Beeches is run by Godalming Scout District in Dunsfold as a green field site with no on-site amenities aside from water.

Scouts also have use of other campsites in the county including Little Acres, a site owned by Girlguiding Epsom with camping space and indoor lodge.

==== Bentley Copse ====
Surrey County Scout Council manages Bentley Copse Activity Centre, which is situated in the Surrey Hills, an area of outstanding natural beauty, about 3 miles (4.8 km) south of the village of Shere. Adjacent to the site is the Hurtwood, some 4,000 acres (16 km^{2}) of mixed woodland which has numerous footpaths and bridleways suitable for hiking, orienteering, wide games and nature study. There are three accommodation buildings on site, Palmer House, Parker Lodge and the Nest which together sleep 62. The site also offers a range of activities including air-rifle shooting, climbing, abseiling, archery, high ropes and caving.

==== Walton Firs ====
Walton Firs is an activity centre for youth groups in Cobham, Surrey. Between 1939 and 2008 it was owned by the Scout Association as a national centre but was leased to Surrey Scouts for the later part of the 20th Century who ran it day to day. In 2004, plans were announced for the centre to be sold as part of the association's aim of creating a smaller number of high quality activity centres. It was purchased by the Walton Firs Foundation in June 2008 for £800,000. 2007 Centenary celebrations were held at Walton Firs, with Carl XVI Gustaf of Sweden visiting during the camp.

The site includes three buildings; the Training Hut for indoor activities that has 4 beds, the Brunswick building that sleeps 24 and the Pembroke building that sleeps 34. Camping space on the site is spread over the 36 acres with three camping pod villages also. Activities offered at the centre include high and low ropes, climbing, caving, archery and rifle shooting.

=== West Sussex ===
Unlike other Scout Counties, West Sussex Scouts do not have a county-managed camping site however there are still a variety of sites available. A number of districts have their own campsites which are available for wider use; these are Beacon Hill, run by Horsham Scout district, Furzefields, run by Arundel and Littlehampton Scout District, Hillside, run by Adur Valley, Parkwood, run by Brighton and Hove Scout District in the neighbouring East Sussex County, Stanford, run by Crawley Scout District, and West Dean run by Chichester Scout District. While all offer camping not all offer indoor bedded accommodation; indoor accommodation can be found at Hillside, Beacon Hill and Parkwood while West Dean and Stanford also have buildings which can be used for indoor activities and training while activities at all these sites are limited. The county is also home to Hammerwood which is owned and run by Lewisham Scout District in Greater London.

Scouts also have access to Blackland Farm Activity Centre and Littlehampton Girlguiding Centre, both run by Girlguiding. Blackland Farm Activity Centre is one of Girlguiding's centrally run activity centres and contains indoor accommodation, camping and activities including high ropes, climbing, kayaking, caving and more adventurous activities. The Littlehampton Girlguiding Centre in comparison is an urban centre which allows overnight accommodation for Scout residentials and is run by Girlguiding Arun Valley Division.

== Gang Shows ==
A number of Gang Shows run in the region, many of which are long established as an outlet for creative expression and as fundraising efforts.

In the North of the region, Buckinghamshire has two gang shows in High Wycombe, running since 1986, and in Milton Keynes, which began in 1990 and has run shows in the Milton Keynes Theatre, Stantonbury Campus Theatre and Walton High's The Venue. Neighbouring Oxfordshire has only one gang show, which began in 1951, as does Berkshire to the South. The South East Berkshire Gang Show started in 1970 before growing and moving to Camberley Civic Hall until moving to the Wilde Theatre, South Hill Park, Bracknell. A show is produced every year in February and consists of around 180 people.

Hampshire has four active gang shows. Basingstoke Gang Show started in 1980 and takes place every two years at the Haymarket Theatre. Gosport Gang Show started in 1978 and takes place annually with the performance taking place at Ferneham Hall in nearby Fareham. Hedge End Gang Show shows at Wildern School and has been running since 1964. Roverang is based in Southampton at the Nuffield Theatre on the University of Southampton's Highfield Campus. The Winchester Gang Show was started in 1955 but no longer runs.

In the South East of the region Kent and Surrey each have two gang shows and East and West Sussex have one each. The Kent shows are based at Maidstone, started in 1939 and staged almost every two years since 1970, and Thanet Gang Show which celebrated its 60th show in 2010 having started in 1946 as Margate Gang Show. Surrey shows are based at Epsom, running every two years since 1975 at the Epsom Playhouse, and in Surrey Heath which started in 2004. The shows in East and West Sussex are all in coastal towns with East Sussex's show being based in Hastings, being held at the White Rock theatre and being held yearly since 1966, and West Sussex's show being based in Worthing. Worthing's Gang Show first ran in October 1967 and has been staged every two years since, awarded the Red Scarf in 1971. There was also Brighton Gang Show, which began in 1959 and ran for 30 shows until 1996, being staged at the Brighton Dome between 1959 and 1991.

== See also ==
- Scouting sections
- Neighbouring areas:
  - Scouting in South West England
  - Scouting in Greater London
  - Scouting in East of England
  - Scouting in the East Midlands
  - Scouting in West Midlands
- Girlguiding Anglia
- Girlguiding London and South East England
