= Scout Adventures (The Scout Association) =

Network of activity centres

- Scout Adventures logo, based upon the logo for The Scout Association.
- Centres: Broadstone Warren, East Sussex; Fordell Firs, Fife; Gilwell Park, North London; Great Tower, Lake District; Lochgoilhead, Loch Lomond; Meggernie, Perthshire; Youlbury, Oxford; Yr Hafod, Snowdonia
- Formerly: Scout Activity Centres
- Headquarters: Gilwell Park, Chingford, London.
- Country: United Kingdom
- Founded: 2016
- Head: Asa Gurden
- Affiliation: The Scout Association
- Website scoutadventures.org.uk

Scout Adventures are a network of activity centres run by The Scout Association. They offer outdoor facilities, adventurous activities and experiences for members of the Scout Association, other youth organisations and school groups. The centres typically have capacity for hundreds of Scouts simultaneously, often including indoor accommodation in addition to camping. Staffed by qualified instructors, they offer adventurous activities and training for adult volunteers and young people following the badges of the Scout programme.

== Purpose ==
Scout Adventures exists to deliver outdoor learning, adventurous activities and residential experiences to members of the Scout Association, other youth groups such as members of Girlguiding, and school groups. They are a commercial division of the Scouts and any profits made supplement the income of the association. They follow the Scout method when delivering activities, with principles such as learning through doing a key tenet of their approach to outdoor learning.

== History ==
=== National campsites pre-2005 ===
During Scouting's early history the need for camp sites and activity centres to train young people and undertake Scout activities and practice Scout skills has been evident. By 2004, over 700 sites were owned, run or had connections to Scout groups, districts or counties/areas with The Scout Association owning 14 sites outright. These were:

Scout owned campsites prior to 2004.
Site	Location	Details
Broadstone Warren	East Sussex	Owned by the Scout Association, leased to East Sussex Scout County.
Bradley Wood	West Yorkshire	Owned by the Scout Association, leased to West Yorkshire Scout County. Acquired in 1942.
Chalfont Heights	Buckinghamshire	Owned by the Scout Association, leased to Greater London Middlesex West Scout County. Acquired in 1938.
Downe	Orpington, Greater London	Owned by the Scout Association, leased to Greater London South East Scout County. Acquired in 1929 and opened in 1933.
Earleywood	Berkshire	Owned by the Scout Association, leased to South Berkshire and South East Berkshire Scout Districts.
Frylands Wood	Croydon, Greater London	Owned by the Scout Association, leased to Lewisham Manor Scout District.
Gilwell Park	Chingford, Greater London	Owned and operated by the Scout Association. Acquired 1919.
Great Tower	Lake District	Owned by the Scout Association, leased to West Lancashire Scout County. Acquired in 1936.
Hawkhirst	Northumberland	Operated by the Scout Association, leased from Forestry Commission.
Kingsdown	Kent	Owned by the Scout Association, leased to Oxfordshire Scout County.
Longridge	Buckinghamshire	Owned by the Scout Association, leased to Buckinghamshire and Oxfordshire Scout Counties. Specialist boating centre, for water activities and based on the River Thames.
Phasels Wood	Hertfordshire	Owned by the Scout Association, leased to Hertfordshire Scout County.
Perry Wood	Surrey	Owned by the Scout Association, leased to Horley Scout District.
Tolmers	Hertfordshire	Owned by the Scout Association, leased to Hertfordshire Scout County.
Walton Firs	Surrey	Owned by the Scout Association, leased to Surrey Scouts. Acquired in 1939.
Youlbury	Oxfordshire	Owned by the Scout Association, leased to Oxfordshire Scout County.

In February 2004, the Scout Association took the decision to sell a number of these campsites and instead focus their efforts on four national centres of excellence. It was noted that while there were many great camping sites, the range of adventurous activities on offer at each varied and so these four centres would be developed into high quality activity centres, run by the Scout Association directly.

The sites no longer owned by the association were sold with the proceeds being used to form the National Campsite Fund, which funds the improvement of the four new centres of excellence and any new sites that may join them at a later date. The last of this fund was used in the 2014–15 financial year. The majority of the sites that existed were sold to the local scout counties or districts that had been running them up until that point. The exceptions to this were Kingsdown International Scout Campsite, which was sold in 2005 to a private group which retains discounts for visiting Scout groups, Longridge Scout Boating Centre, which was sold to user group The Friends of Longridge Trust before becoming The Adventure Learning Charity in 2014, Perry Wood International Scout Campsite, which was not taken on by the local district and closed with the site redeveloped for housing in 2013 and Walton Firs Campsite, which was sold in 2008 to the Walton Firs Foundation who continue to run the site as an activity centre for youth groups maintaining strong links with the Scouts.

=== Scout Activity Centres ===
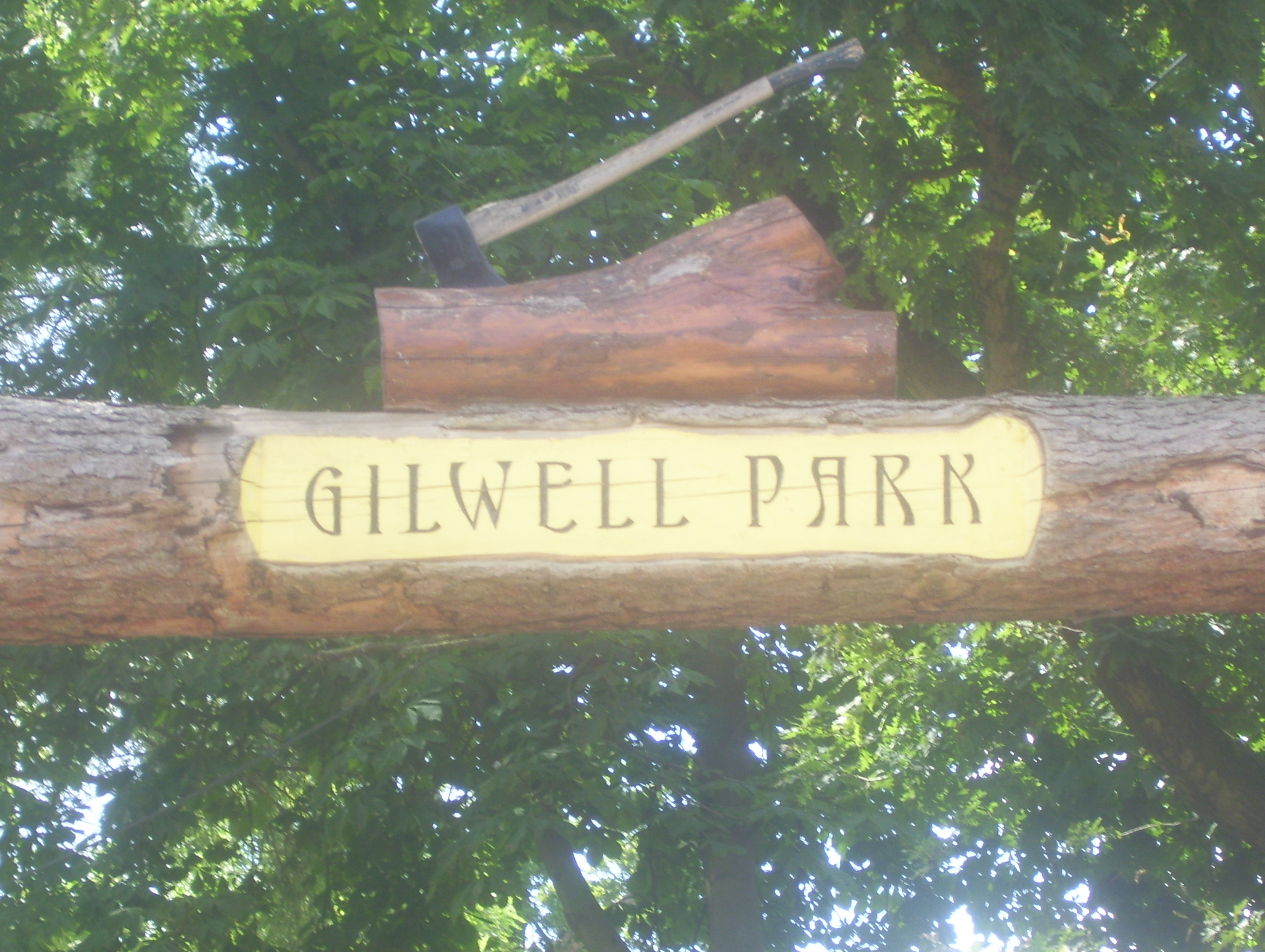
Each new National Scout Activity Centre had a symbol to represent the site. Gilwell Park's was based on a log and axe, seen here on the Leopard gates, adopted from safety advice given to new leaders during training courses.

In 2005, the Scout Association launched four enhanced Scout Activity Centres that offered residentials, camping and high quality activities on offer to members. The four initially chosen at the announcement of the plan in February 2004 were Downe Scout Activity Centre, for the Southern Home counties, Gilwell Park, recognised as headquarters of the association and spiritual home of Scouting, Youlbury Scout Activity Centre, for the Northern Home counties, and Great Tower for the North of England. However, when the Scout Activity Centres launched in 2005, Great Tower was not among them and a new centre for the North, Hawkhirst Scout Activity Centre, was launched c. February 2007. Despite not having any on-site activities, the central London Baden-Powell House was also listed as a Scout Activity Centre alongside the others from the launch until 2011.

Towards the end of the decade, the Scout Association began to expand the number of Scout Activity Centres that met the standard of the centres of excellence. The first of these was Ferny Crofts Scout Activity Centre in the New Forest, becoming a partner centre on 1 September 2009. This allowed the site to benefit from joint training, marketing and common strategy but continued throughout to be owned by Hampshire Scouts and run by Hampshire Scouts staff. The expansion also triggered a refresh of the Scout Activity Centre brand, moving from clean and fresh typography and a local square icon to a more rugged and dirty typography that emphasises mud and the outdoors along with the localised icon. Two more sites, Great Tower Scout Activity Centre in the Lake District and Woodhouse Park Scout Activity Centre near the mouth of the River Severn became national centres on 1 April 2011 and a further two, Crawfordsburn Scout Activity Centre in County Down, Northern Ireland and Yr Hafod Scout Activity Centre in Snowdonia, Wales, joined on 6 September 2012.

=== Scout Adventures ===
In September 2016, the nine sites re-branded to Scout Adventures with a logo that uses the scout fleur-de-lis symbol significantly in line with the main Scout Association brand at that time. The name change was reported to better reflect what the organisation did and its focus. At this time Ferny Crofts withdrew from the Scout Adventures partnership, choosing to continue under their own direction and remain a successful activity centre run by Hampshire Scouts.

A further expansion occurred in 2017 with the addition of four centres. In July, Buddens Scout Adventure Centre in Dorset became part of the grouping, remaining owned and operated by Dorset Scouts, but opening up Scout Adventures to the West Country for the first time. Then on 1 September, the three National Activity Centres run by Scouts Scotland joined the Scout Adventures network: Fordell Firs Scout Adventure Centre in Fife, Lochgoilhead Scout Adventures Centre on Loch Lomond and Meggernie Scout Adventures Centre in Perthshire. These three, similar to the other recent partnership centres, continue to be owned and run by Scouts Scotland. The visual identity was updated from 2018 to the current logo using many of the same principles of the previous look but applied the Scout Association's new simplified fleur-de-lis and typeface.

=== Impact of Coronavirus pandemic ===
The 2020 Coronavirus pandemic, COVID-19, affected the Scout Adventures centres significantly with all having to close and cancel planned activities and bookings while still incurring costs. In August, the chief executive of Scouts Scotland spoke out about the real threat of closure affecting their three activity centres, Fordell Firs, Meggernie and Lochgoilhead Scout Adventures centres and called upon the Scottish Government to provide additional support to the sector.

In October the Scout Association announced that they would be reducing the number of adventure centres following the financial impact of the coronavirus pandemic, citing a need to reduce staffing costs and assets, enable the association's depleted cash reserves to be replenished, and to allow for local groups badly affected by the pandemic to be helped.

Operation of the centres at Buddens, Dorset, and Woodhouse Park, Bristol, were returned to the counties that own them in 2021, with the latter being operated by Avon Scouts, and the former being operated on Dorset Scouts' behalf by adventure education group Rockley. The centre at Downe in Kent was closed in 2021 and sold in October 2024 to Friends of Downe Activity Centre. Furthermore, the association sold Baden-Powell House in central London, the former headquarters of the association and hostel, in August 2021 to independent school Mander Portman Woodward. When considering the sites for closure, the association took into consideration factors including local provision, such as whether other activity centres owned by Scouts are available nearby, and the needs of the site, such as whether investment was required or how the site was used.

In early 2021, the Scout Association once again took control of Broadstone Warren Scout Activity Centre in East Sussex, which had previously been owned by the association but since 2004 had been run entirely by East Sussex Scout County, after the county could no longer run the centre. Later that summer, Crawfordsburn was removed as a Scout Adventures centre with the operations returning to Scouts Northern Ireland. In November 2024, the Scout Association further announced the closure of Hawkhirst Scout Adventure centre in Northumberland from 31 March 2025, citing the lack of bookings since the pandemic and the investment needed in the site.

== Current sites ==
=== Broadstone Warren ===
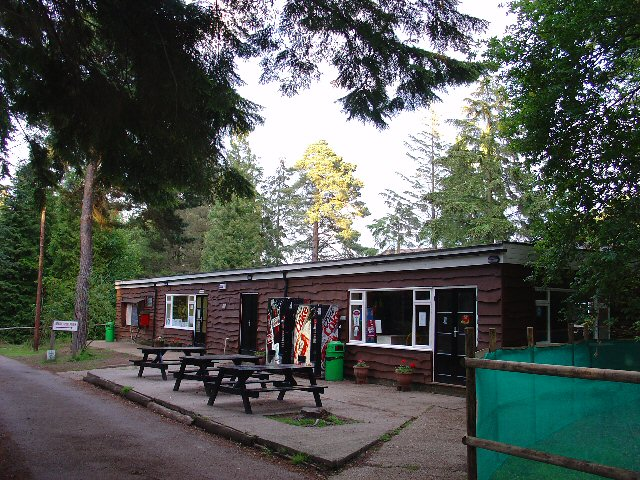
Shop and Reception building at Broadstone Warren

Broadstone Warren Scout Adventures is a 400-acre site in Ashdown Forest, East Sussex. Operating as a campsite since 1937, it was one of the Scout Association owned sites prior to the 2004 Centres of Excellence plan and was subsequently leased to East Sussex Scout County. It is the most recent addition to the Scout Adventures network in June 2021 following the impact of the coronavirus pandemic.

On-site facilities include a large range of woodland campsites, an indoor accommodation lodge for 38 people, a wide range of activities including a climbing and abseiling tower, crate stacking, leap of faith, net climb, long zip wire, archery range, low ropes, tomahawk range, backwoods cooking and bushcraft, shelter building, pedal carts.

Planned refurbishment over winter 2022 includes 2 replacement toilet and shower blocks, reopening of the tunnels/potholing complex and a new high-ropes activity area.

=== Fordell Firs ===
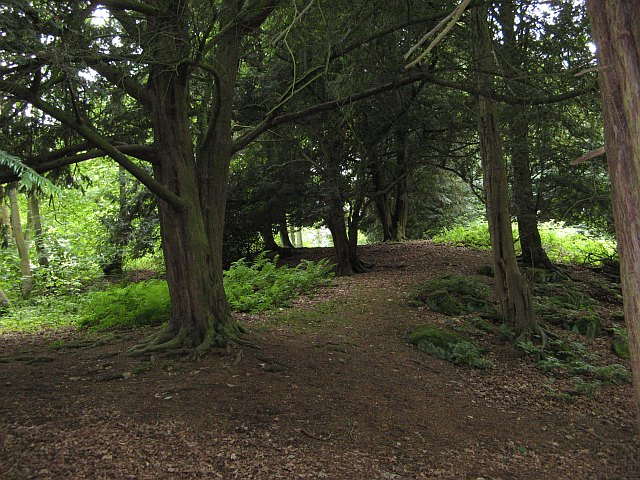
Woodland around Fordell Firs.

Fordell Firs Scout Adventures is a 48-acre site near Dunfermline, Fife, Scotland. Along with the other two Scottish centres, it joined the Scout Adventures grouping on 1 September 2017. The centre is owned and run by Scouts Scotland as one of their National Activity Centres and is also the location of the charity's headquarters.

The site has two accommodation buildings on site: the single storey Garth Morrison Lodge and the two storey Henderson building with 67 beds together. It is bolstered with a tented village that sleeps 64 and an activity hall for groups on site.

Activities on site include climbing, caving, 3G swing, tree climbing, zip line and archery as well as a number of other traditional Scouting and outdoor activities. They also offer bell boating on nearby Loch Ore.

=== Gilwell Park ===
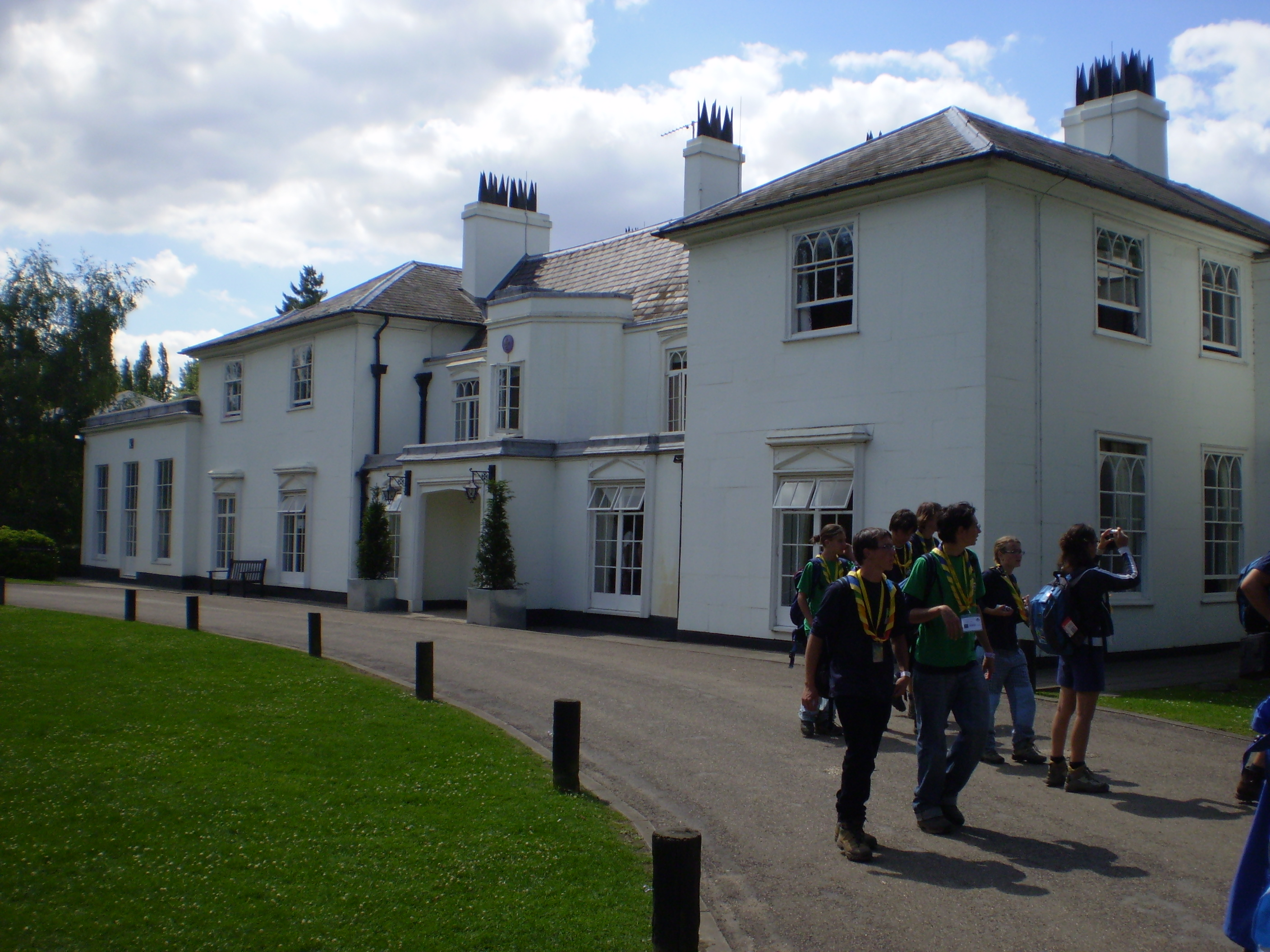
The White House at Gilwell Park.

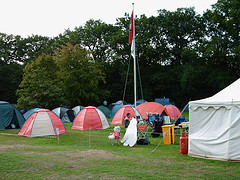
A Scout camp at Gilwell Park

Gilwell Park is a 109-acre estate on the outskirts of Chingford, Greater London. It is notable as a national and international leader training centre as the original leader training and the famous wood badge recognition both originated from Gilwell Park. It is consequently one of the landmarks of the world Scouting movement and international attendance at training and events for leaders is not uncommon.

It was acquired for the Scout Association in 1919 and has since been expanded a number of times with land surrounding it being bought up in the time since. At the cultural centre of the site is the White House, an 18th-century mansion house that has been converted into a hotel, event and conference centre. The nearby Gilwell House, opened in 2001, is the headquarters of the Scout Association.

The adventurous activities and camping operations of the site were grouped and branded as Gilwell Park Scout Activity Centre when launched in 2005. Its logo from these years was based on an axe buried into a log in a rounded lime green square with black border: the axe and log is a long-standing symbol of Gilwell Park and relates to safety advice given during the early leader training courses. The name was updated to Gilwell Park Scout Adventures in September 2016 at the annual Gilwell Reunion event, although the symbol of the axe and log remains as a symbol of the site as a whole.

The site contains a number of camping fields suited to different purposes, four indoor accommodation blocks, a tented village and two patrol cabins leaving a combined total of 264 beds (excluding those in the White House which are not administered by Scout Adventures). The site has a number of amenities including shop, cafe, places of worship for a number of different faiths and various articles of Scouting history located throughout the site. Activities offered include indoor and outdoor climbing and high ropes, low ropes, 3G swing, zip line, water based activities on the 'Bomb hole' pond, target activities, bouldering, trails and crate stacking.

=== Great Tower ===
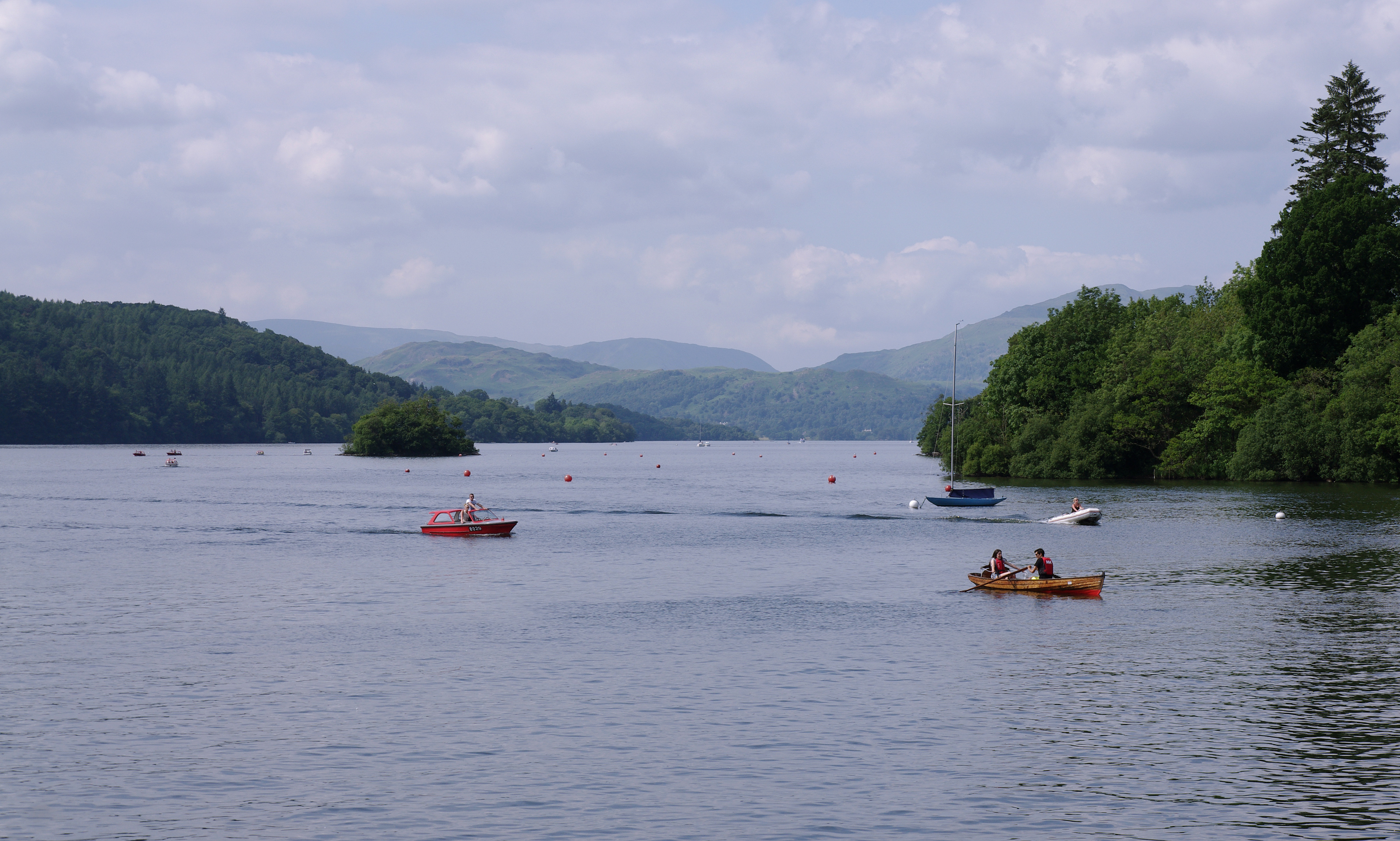
Lake Windermere, which Great Tower is located near to.

Great Tower Scout Adventures is located near the Eastern shore of Lake Windermere in the Lake District National Park. The 250 acres (1.0 km^{2}) site is mostly covered in thick woodland and rocky landscapes. It was acquired by the Scout Association in 1936 but until recently was leased out to West Lancashire Scouts. It was originally announced in February 2004 as the soon to be national centre of excellence for the North of England but this came to nothing. The centre eventually joined the national grouping on 1 April 2011, becoming Great Tower Scout Activity Centre with a logo of a silhouette stone tower against a yellow square with rounded corners and black outline. It was renamed to its present name in September 2016.

The site has five lodges for indoor accommodation and a tented village with a total of 150 beds in addition to pitches for camping located across the site in a variety of different locations including field, woodland and hill top. Activities on offer include high ropes, low ropes, target activities, raft building, tree climbing and crag climbing.

=== Hawkhirst ===
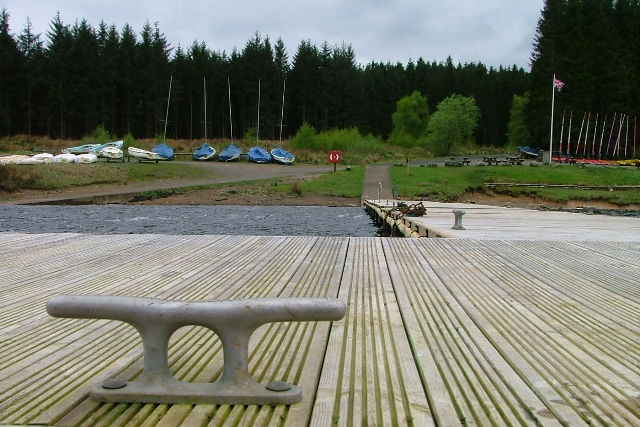
The jetty at Hawkhirst Scout Adventures for Kielder Water.

Hawkhirst Scout Adventures is located on the shore of Kielder Water in Kielder Forest in Northumberland. The site spans 70 acres and has been operated directly by the Scout Association since its open. Having launched as Hawkhirst Adventure Camp, it joined the wider national network as a centre of excellence for the North of England in 2007 as Hawkhirst Scout Activity Centre. Its initial logo was of three silhouette trees, similar to the conifers planted as part of Kielder Forest, on an orange rounded square with black outline. It became Hawkhirst Scout Adventures in September 2016. The association announced they will cease operations at the centre on 31 March 2025 with the site's future beyond this point unannounced.

The site has three lodges for indoor accommodation and a tented village of nine bell tents with a combined total of 137 beds. Activities include a climbing wall, adventure courses, target activities and a wide range of water activities utilising Kielder Water.

=== Lochgoilhead ===
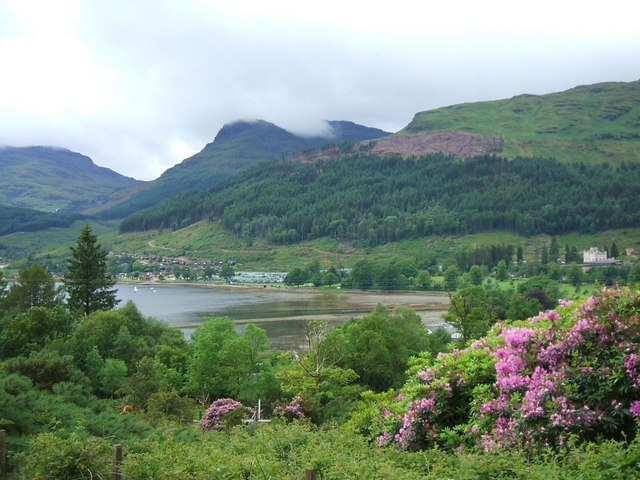
The landscape around Lochgoilhead. The centre is just below the ridge in this picture, out of sight.

Lochgoilhead Scout Adventures is in Lochgoilhead at the Northern end of Loch Goil within the Loch Lomond and The Trossachs National Park, Scotland. Along with the other two Scottish centres, it joined the Scout Adventures grouping on 1 September 2017. The centre is owned and run by Scouts Scotland as one of their National Activity Centres since 1965.

The site is unusual for a Scout Adventures site in that it has a sizeable area of grounds which is utilised for adventurous activities but is not available for camping. Instead it has an extensive indoor accommodation layout with one long dormitory building divided into four self contained blocks that sleep a total of 92 beds and three lodges with a total of 44 beds all served by dining room and three classrooms.

Activities on site are extensive and include climbing, abseiling, crate stacking, high ropes, ghyll scrambling, archery and mountain biking in addition to traditional outdoor and Scouting skills such as fire lighting and navigation. A significant draw for the centre however is the wide range of boating activities on Loch Goil which include canoeing, kayaking, bell-boating, sailing and power boating.

=== Meggernie ===
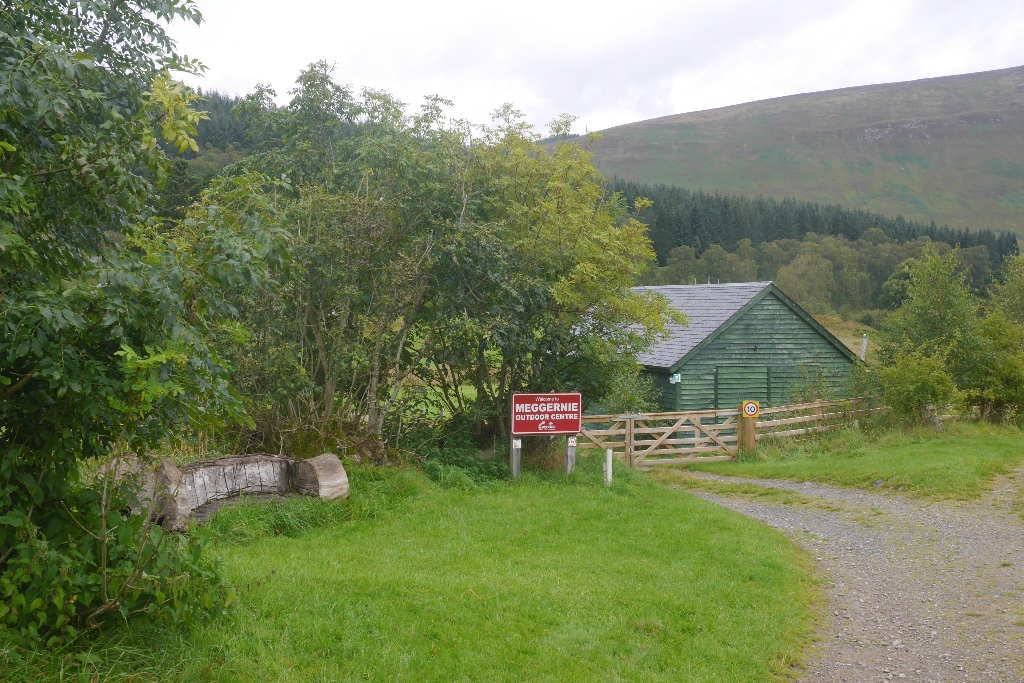
Meggernie Scout Adventures.

Meggernie Scout Adventures is a 15-acre site in Glen Lyon, Perthshire in the Scottish Highlands. Along with the other two Scottish centres, it joined the Scout Adventures grouping on 1 September 2017. The centre is owned and run by Scouts Scotland as one of their National Activity Centres. It is bordered by the River Lyon on site and is tailored towards a wilderness experience with water coming from a bore hole and sterilised rather than from the mains.

The site has indoor accommodation in the site farmhouse which can sleep 30 as well as outdoor camping locations. This includes an area for sleeping in hammocks and a wooden bivouac shelter which can sleep five and is open to the air allowing guests to sleep under the stars. There is also a great hall which can be used for indoor activities.

Activities on site are tailored towards survival skills and environmental studies and fit into the remote nature of the highlands. Adventurous activities include a tyrolean crossing of the river, bouldering, grass sledging and archery whereas activities such as pioneering and backwoods cooking rely more on traditional and survival skills. Environmental activities on the site include star gazing, pond dipping, bat detecting and walks that get participants to rely on their senses.

=== Youlbury ===
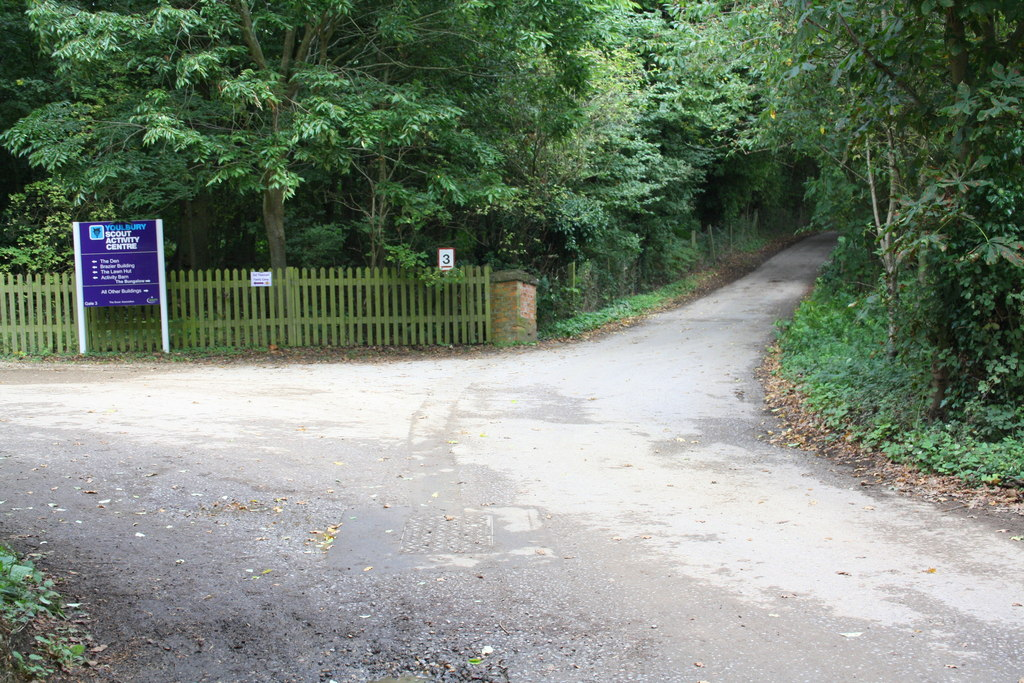
One of the site entrances to Youlbury. The sign shows the old logo of Youlbury Scout Activity Centre.

Youlbury Scout Adventures is located in Oxfordshire, a few miles South West from central Oxford. It is owned by the Scout Association and is one of the oldest Scout Campsites in the world, having been opened in 1913 and even serving as the headquarters of the Scout Association for a time during the Second World War. Since 2005 it has been run directly by the Scout Association as Youlbury Scout Activity Centre, having been run by Oxfordshire Scouts before being announced as one of the original national centres of excellence in 2004 as the designated centre for the Northern Home counties. The initial logo of Youlbury Scout Activity Centre showed the silhouette of a boar in a sky blue box with rounded corners and black edge in reference to the site's location on Boar's Hill. It was renamed to Youlbury Scout Adventures in September 2016 in line with the other sites.

The site has three indoor accommodation blocks and two tented villages providing a combination of 204 beds as well as two indoor classroom blocks. Activities offered at the site include climbing, abseiling, high ropes, go-karts, crate stacking, bouldering, 3G swing, target activities (archery, rifle shooting and tomahawk throwing) and various trails.

=== Yr Hafod ===
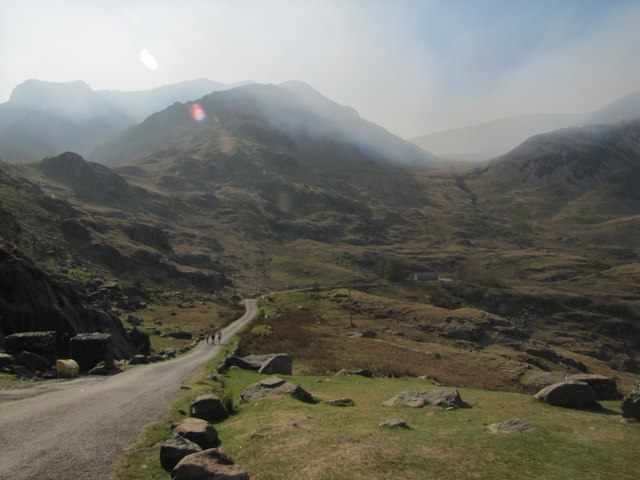
The pass with Yr Hafod shown in the middle distance.

Yr Hafod Scout Adventures is located in Nant Ffrancon Pass, Snowdonia, North Wales. Opened in 1959 by Bill Tilman, it is owned by Scouts Cymru as their Mountaineering Training Centre. It joined the national grouping of activity sites on 6 September 2012 as Yr Hafod Scout Activity Centre with a logo featuring a mountain outlined in a dark green square with rounded corners and black outline. It renamed as Yr Hafod Scout Adventures in September 2016 along with the other national centres.

Yr Hafod, Welsh for 'The Summer House', is unlike other Scout Adventures sites; it is a single 32 bed lodge, not a larger site, and represents the only accommodation with no camping option available. It offers crag climbing, hill walking and hiking in the surrounding mountains and runs a significant number of mountaineering training courses each year. It is also a base for expeditions, particularly for parties undertaking their Duke of Edinburgh's Award.

== Former sites ==
=== Baden-Powell House ===
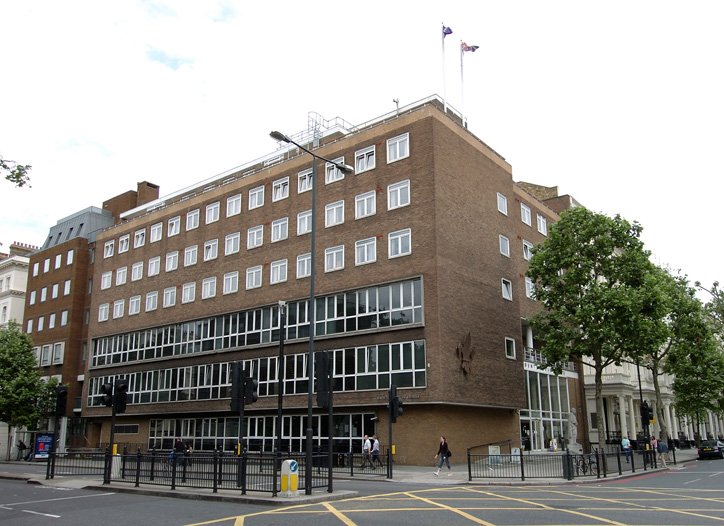
Baden-Powell House as seen in 2004.

Baden-Powell House was a hostel, event and conference centre in South Kensington, London. It was built as a tribute to Lord Baden-Powell, the founder of Scouting, and later extended to serve as the headquarters for The Scout Association as well as serving as a hostel providing modern and affordable lodging for Scouts, Guides, their families and the general public staying in London. When the association moved their headquarters to Gilwell House in 2001, it reverted to being a hostel, event and conference facility.

Although never part of the Scout Activity Centres brand, the centre was advertised alongside them before the running of the centre was franchised to Meininger Hotels. Following the impact of the COVID-19 pandemic and a decline in numbers of Scouts using the facility, the Scout Association sold the building to Mander Portman Woodward who run it as an events and conference venue and are converting the hostel rooms into boarding accommodation for students.

=== Buddens ===
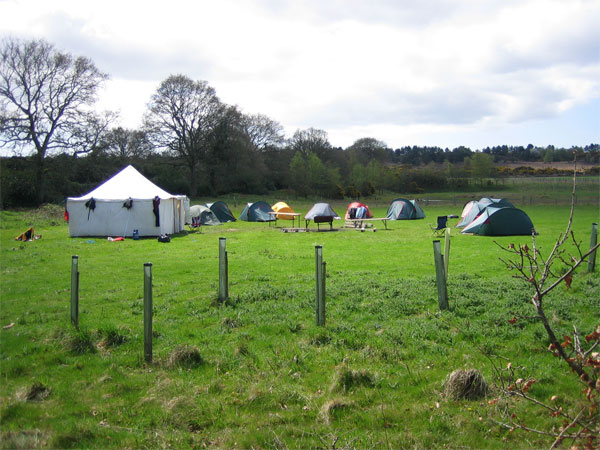
Camping fields at Buddens.

Buddens Scout Adventures was added to the Scout Adventures network in 2017 and was located near Wareham, Dorset, close to the Isle of Purbeck, Brownsea Island and Durdle Door. It was owned by and run in partnership with Dorset Scouts, who also use the centre as their headquarters, and the centre returned to their operation in 2021 following the impact of the coronavirus pandemic. The 95-acre site was bought in 1994 as a former farm and quarry site. It has since been developed as a camp site and activity centre with 15 acres set aside as a Site of Nature Conservation Interest.

The site contained a number of very large camping fields, a 45-bed tented village, a three level tunnelling complex, an 8.5-acre lake which was used for a variety of water activities and a new climbing tower.

=== Crawfordsburn ===
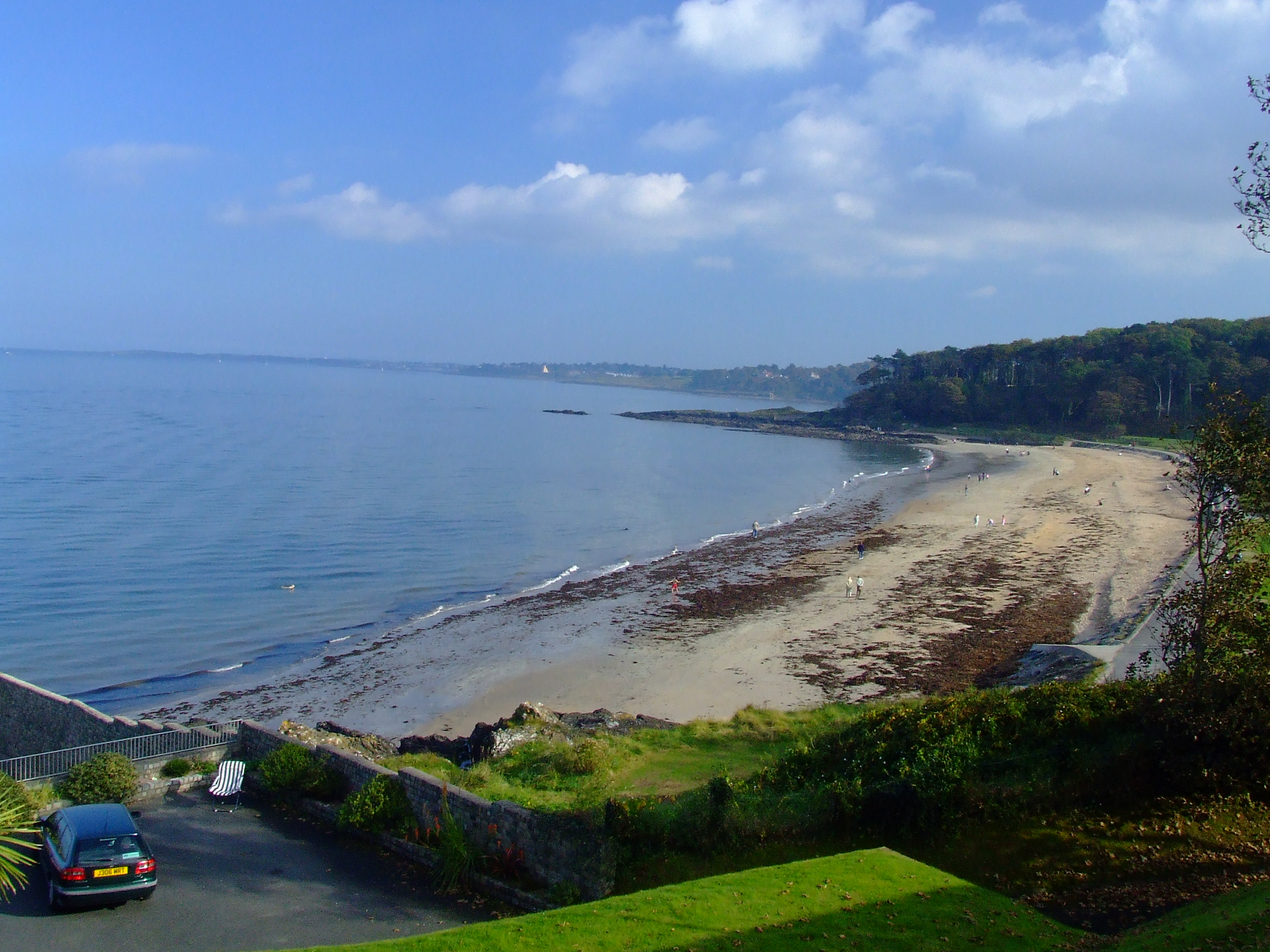
The bay of the adjacent County Park.

Crawfordsburn Scout Adventures was the only Scout Adventures centre in Northern Ireland, located adjacent to Crawfordsburn County Park and within 3 miles of Bangor and 10 miles of Belfast. It has 22 acres of camping and two residential buildings, with a combined 70 beds, which was expanded recently; the most recent was opened in October 2016 by Northern Irish Minister for Education Peter Weir. Originally part of the Sharman estate, it was opened in October 1948 and received a visit from Lord Rowallan, the Chief Scout, a decade later in 1958. It joined the network of national centres as a partner centre on 6 September 2012 as Crawfordsburn Scout Activity Centre before being rebranded to Crawfordsburn Scout Adventures in September 2016. Its facilities included a caving complex, climbing wall, adventure course and trail, 3G swing, zip line and crate climb. Following the impact of the coronavirus pandemic, the centre ceased to be a Scout Adventure centre although the centre remains operational, run by Scouts NI.

=== Downe ===
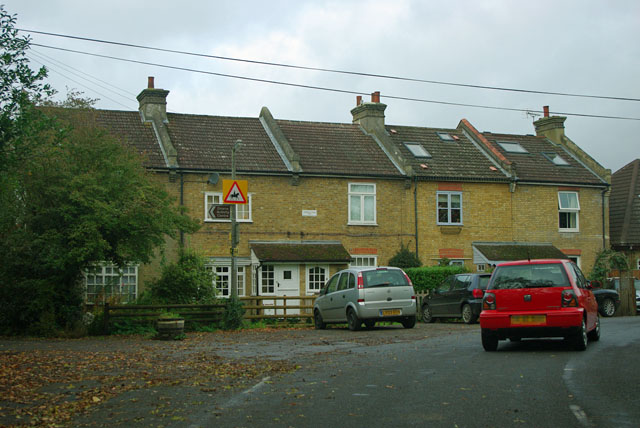
Historic cottages near the site. The entrance road can be seen on the left signposted.

Downe Scout Adventures was located near Orpington near the boundary between Greater London and Kent and near to Biggin Hill and Down House, the home of naturalist Charles Darwin. It was owned by the Scout Association and was one of the original national Scout Activity Centres following the centres of excellence programme announced in 2004. Between 2005 and 2021, it was run directly by the Scout Association, having been run by Greater London South East Scouts since 1987. The initial logo of Downe Scout Activity Centre showed the silhouette of a pheasant in a scarlet box with rounded corners and black edge in reference to some of the wildlife found on site. It was renamed to Downe Scout Adventures in September 2016 in line with the other sites.

The site had three lodges for indoor accommodation and two tented villages with a combined bed total of 206 in addition to a number of fields of various sides and a large section of woodland. It offers a range of activities including climbing, high ropes, trails and courses, zip line and target activities.

The impact of the Coronavirus pandemic, affected the site badly and in October 2020 the Scout Association announced that Downe was being closed and sold off with the site closing entirely in January 2021. In July 2021, the decision was made to sell the site to the Friends of Downe Activity Centre, who had rallied local community support, once they had raised sufficient funds to complete the sale.

=== Ferny Crofts ===
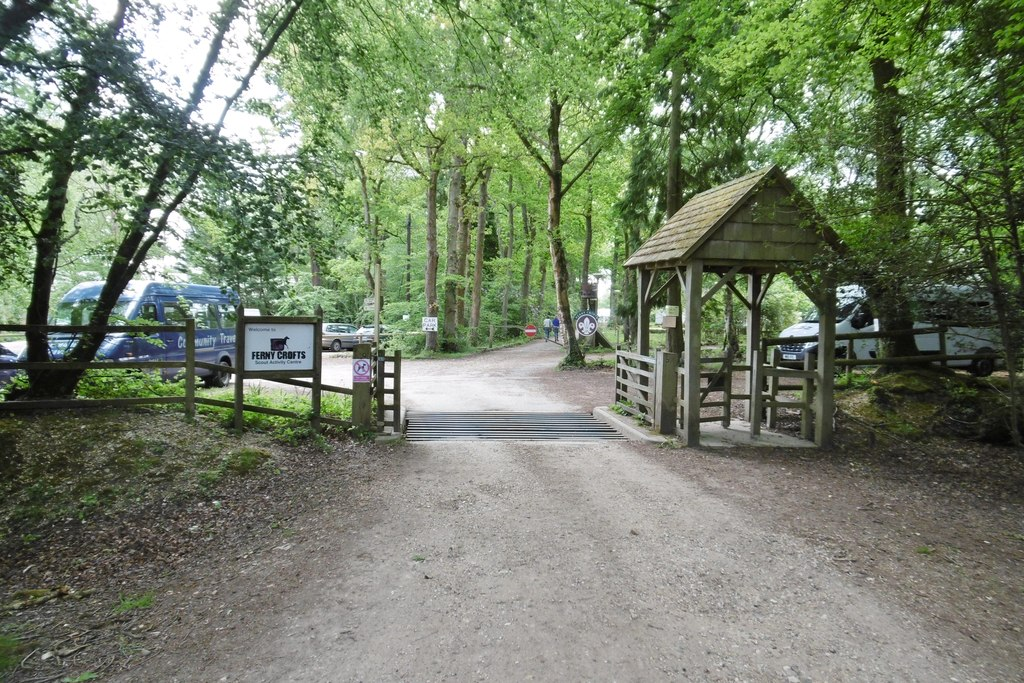
The entrance to Ferny Crofts Scout Activity Centre, which was partnered between 2009 and 2016. The sign from its time as a national centre can be seen on the left.

Ferny Crofts Scout Activity Centre is sited in the New Forest National Park in Hampshire. The site had been in use as a training and activity centre owned by Hampshire Scouts since 1975 before becoming the first partner Scout Activity Centre on 1 September 2009. This allowed the site to benefit from joint training, marketing and common strategy but continued throughout to be owned by Hampshire Scouts and run by Hampshire Scouts staff. They withdrew from the partnership in 2016 as the group rebranded into Scout Adventures and the site remains a Scout Activity Centre run by Hampshire Scouts.

The site contains a sizable camping field and a number of other wooded camping sites and at the time of being a national centre had three accommodation units. As well as advertising off-site activities including the National Motor Museum, Beaulieu and Brownsea Island, the site hosted high ropes, archery, an adventure course, two climbing towers, rifle shooting, tomahawk throwing and raft building.

=== Woodhouse Park ===
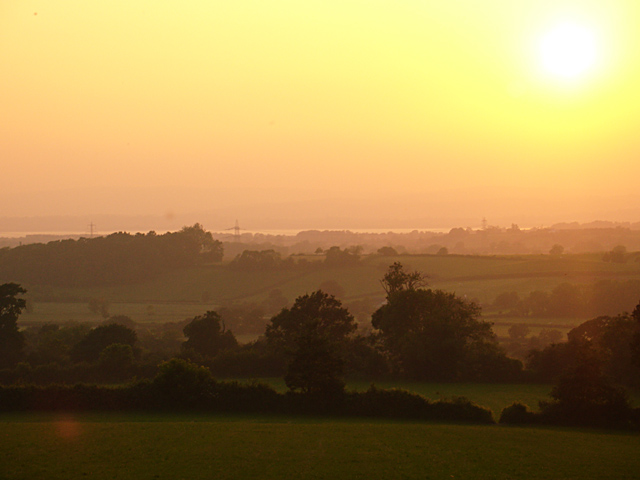
View from Woodhouse Park including the River Severn and Bristol Channel in the background.

Woodhouse Park Scout Adventures is sited in South Gloucestershire overlooking the River Severn, near to the Severn Bridge and the junction of the M4 and M5 motorways. The 36-acre site includes large open fields and woodland and is owned by and the headquarters of Avon Scouts. The centre joined the national network of centres on 1 April 2011, becoming Woodhouse Park Scout Activity Centre with a logo of a silhouette of the Second Severn Crossing against a lime green square with rounded corners and black outline. It was renamed to Woodhouse Park Scout Adventures in September 2016 before ceasing as a national centre following the Coronavirus pandemic in 2020 with the site being returned to Avon Scouts. The site fully reopened in October 2021

The site has five large camping fields, two buildings which can be used for accommodation or training purposes and a tented village . Woodhouse Park offers a range of activities on site include climbing, abseiling, high ropes, low ropes, crate stacking, target activities (including archery, rifle shooting and tomahawk throwing), pedal karts, trails and scouting courses .

== See also ==
- Kandersteg International Scout Centre, an international Scouting Centre in Switzerland.
- Lookwide Camp
