= Ferny Crofts Scout Activity Centre =

Network of activity centres

- Scout Adventures logo, based upon the logo for The Scout Association.
- Location: Beaulieu Road, Hampshire
- Country: United Kingdom
- Founded: 1976
- Affiliation: The Scout Association
- Governing body: Part of Hampshire Scouts.
- Website fernycrofts.org.uk

Ferny Crofts Scout Activity Centre is a 31-acre outdoor camping and activity centre near Beaulieu in the New Forest National Park in the United Kingdom. It is owned and managed by Hampshire Scouts and between 2009 and 2016 it formed part of the Scout Association's national network of Scout Activity Centres. It is primarily open to scouts, guides, youth groups and schools.

== History ==
=== Establishment and growth ===
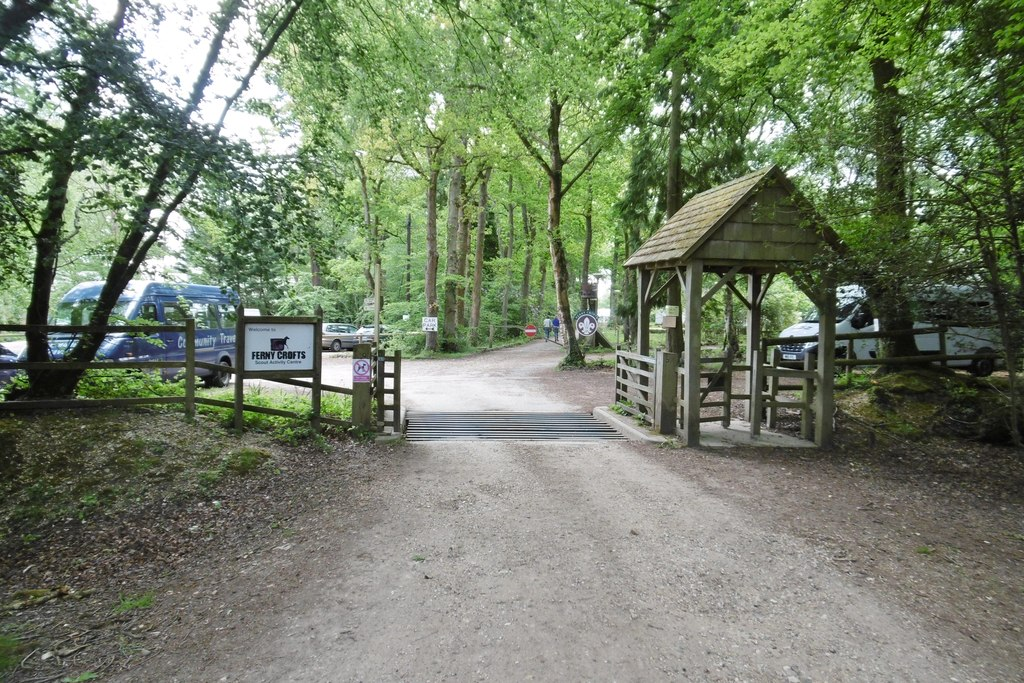
The entrance to Ferny Crofts Scout Activity Centre

The site occupied by Ferny Crofts previously belonged to the monks of Beaulieu Abbey and the Lords of Beaulieu until 1899 when the site was sold off as a private residence. After attempts to turn the site into a caravan park, plans were drawn up by Hampshire Scouts for a county training centre from 1971 with Hampshire County Scout Council purchasing the site in 1975.

The oldest building on the site, currently known as The Croft, was used in part for accommodation and as a training centre from early on in the centre's use but took time to renovate due to the poor condition of parts of the building and to convert the various buildings from their farm uses. It was extended in 1991 and 2008, which is today occupied by reception and the Ferny Crofts offices, and again from 2007 to form a conservatory at the rear, to be named the Sky High Conservatory in recognition of the Hampshire Scouts who reached the summit of Mount Everest in 2007. A self contained accommodation unit, the Inca Suit, was constructed in 2009 as part of the complex.

Fundraising for the second accommodation block began in 1976, to be a self-catered pack holiday centre, and permission was granted in 1982. The foundation stone was laid by Lord Romsey in 1983 and the completed building was opened three years later by his mother Countess Mountbatten and named in honour of her father as Mountbatten Lodge in recognition of the family's links to Hampshire Scouts.

During this time the site was also enhanced with some additional features and activities including a Gambian round house in 1991, a 12m high climbing tower in 1998 and a refurbished high ropes course in 2008. Since 1981, the site has also been the headquarters location for Hampshire Scouts, the Scout county covering all of Hampshire and making it the largest in the country by membership. Initially this was in a portable building until moving to an office on the upper floor of Mountbatten Lodge in 1986 and then into the repurposed Warden's Flat in the Croft Centre in 2007.

=== National Scout Activity Centre ===
On 1 September 2009, Ferny Crofts joined the national Scout Activity Centres network as their first partner centre. In the preceding five years, the Scout Association had sold off a number of their owned campsites, often to local Scout counties who already ran them, and developing the remaining four as directly operated high quality centres of excellence with a focus on high quality adventurous activities as well as camping. In joining this network, Ferny Crofts had to demonstrate a similarly high standard of activities and benefited from joint training, marketing and common strategy. However it remained owned and operated by Hampshire Scouts during this time. The current name and logo, consisting of a silhouetted New Forest pony against a purple square, was introduced at this time.

In 2014, the Chief Scout, Bear Grylls, visited the site as part of his Bear in the Air tour of Scouts across the country. He visited the site by helicopter for an hour visit, meeting around 250 Scouts on site.

During their time as a national centre, Ferny Crofts expanded the number of activities offered including a Low Ropes course, survival area, tomahawk throwing and Aeroball (volleyball played on trampolines). The toilet block and washing up area was also extensively re-modelled in 2016.

=== Hampshire Scouts centre ===
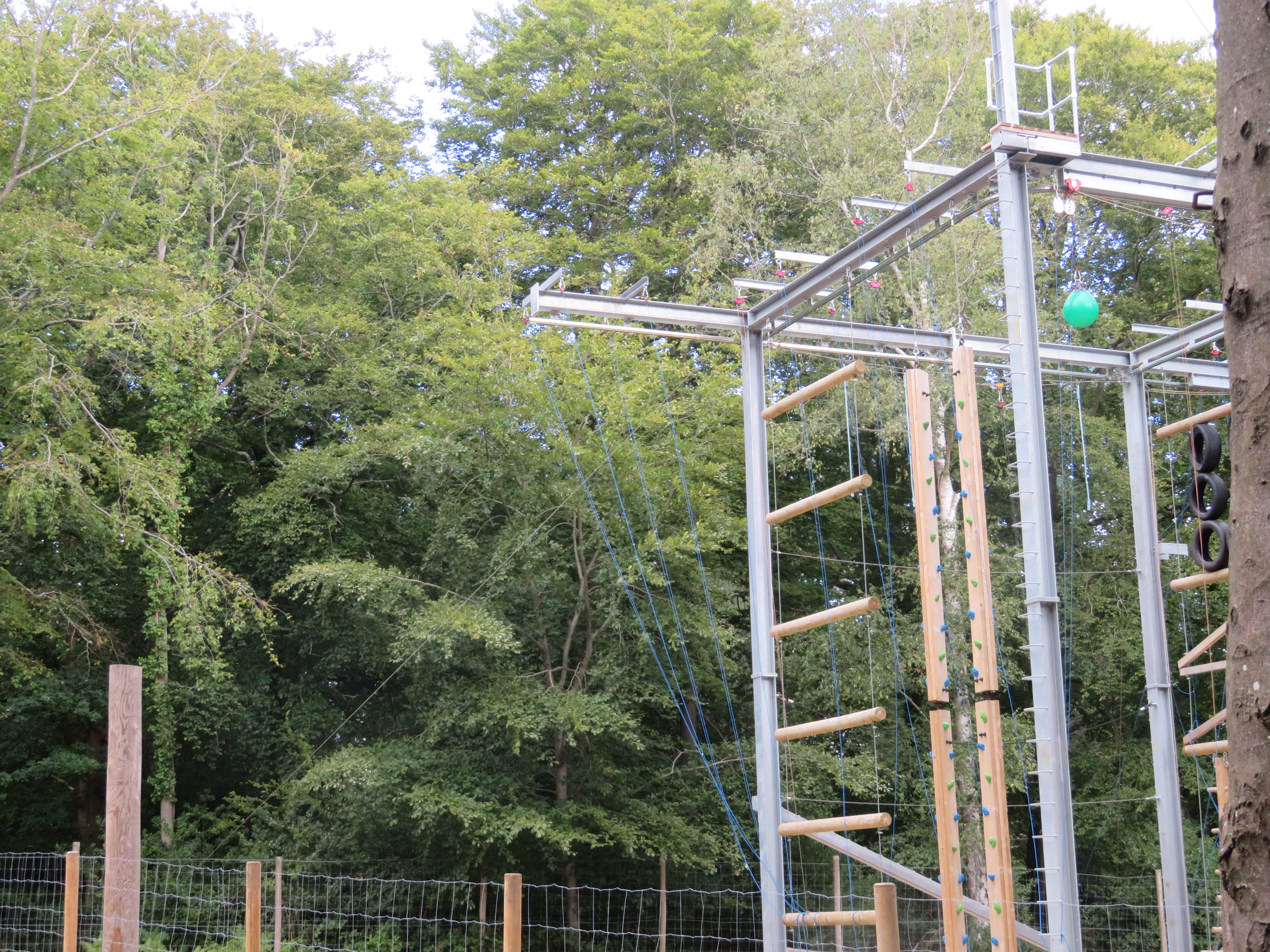
The 2019 High Ropes course

In September 2016, Scout Activity Centres re-branded as Scout Adventures with Ferny Crofts not continuing their partnership with the group at this time. Ferny Crofts appeared in early Scout Adventures marketing materials but was removed from their website a few months later. They continued to use the logo and brand from the Scout Activity Centre era and, as of 2020, is still in use.

The centre celebrated its 40th anniversary in 2017 with a refurbishment of the Mountbatten Lodge accommodation building, a new nine-hole crazy golf course and a designated quiet zone with pizza oven. The existing adventure course was expanded and improved in 2018 and 2019, the pond was reinforced against erosion and a new high ropes course with metal supports with a design lifespan on 25 years was installed in 2019. A tented village was also added in 2018. Since 2018 the centre has also hosted a small museum looking at the history of Scouting in the areas and run by volunteers from Hampshire Scouts Heritage.

In recent years annual events have been added by the centre including a halloween themed evening called Fright Night and a Mud Run.

== Location ==
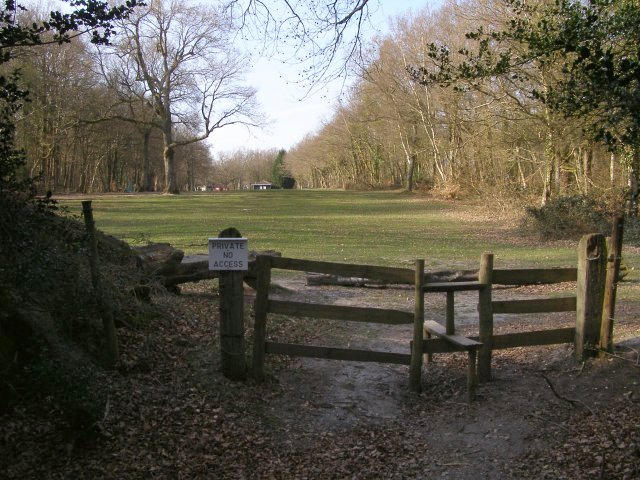
The southern entrance to Ferny Crofts for groups staying on site. The amenities block is visible in the distance at the top of the strip.

The activity centre is located in the centre of the New Forest and well within the New Forest National Park. It is surrounded by crown land that is run by Forestry England and can be reached through entrances at the north and south of the site. Only the north entrance is accessible to vehicles along a gravel track. This area of the forest is mostly heathland although there is a notable patch of bog and marsh located to the west of the site.

The centre is located off a tertiary road running between the B3056 Beaulieu Road and the A326 Hythe Bypass. It is physically closer to Beaulieu Road however and so the centre's address is often cited as being on Beaulieu Road. It is a mile from Beaulieu Road railway station on the South West Main Line and is five miles from Lyndhurst to the North West and four miles from Beaulieu to the South. The nearest city is Southampton, ten miles away to the East. National Cycle Route 2, running from Dover to St Austell, passes the entrance to the centre.

Local attractions include a number of sites within the New Forest National Park, notably including the National Motor Museum and Buckler's Hard Maritime village located as part of the nearby Beaulieu Estate, the New Forest Wildlife Park and Hurst Castle. Other popular destinations outside of the national park include Paultons Park near Totton, Marwell Zoo near Winchester, Splashdown Waterpark in Poole and Brownsea Island in Poole Harbour - notable among Scouts as the birthplace of the movement.

== Facilities ==
=== Campsites and site facilities ===
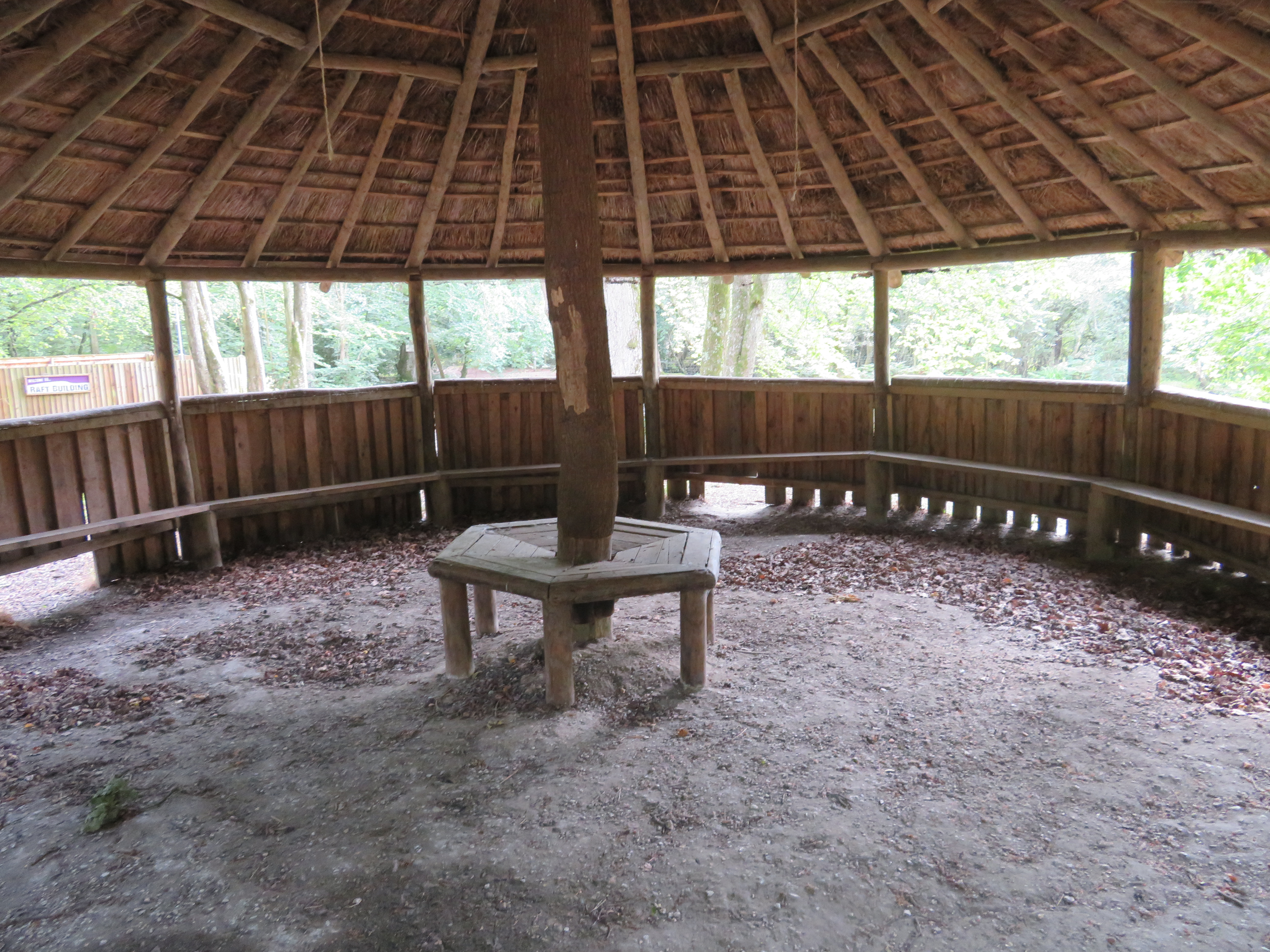
The inside of the Roundhouse

Ferny Crofts' site consists of a large central field with a strip of grass running from this to the southern boundary of the site. Surrounding this to the East and West are swathes of mixed woodland that runs to the boundary and to the north by the car park and Mountbatten Lodge. There is also a smaller section of woodland to the North West which is near to The Croft Centre. the amenities block, containing toilets, refuse and washing up facilities is in the centre of the site. Along the centre of the Western boundary lies a pond, artificially enlarged over time, which is used for water activities. The entire site is designated a site of special scientific interest.

Camping within the site takes place on 27 designated camp sites spread throughout the site, twelve of which are located on the main field areas with the remainder located in the woods on the site, most notably in the South Eastern and South Western areas of the site. Drinking water taps are located around the site for users and each site is equipped with a concrete fire pit. One site is a designated tented village of bell tents which are furnished with beds and wooden floors.

Other camping structures on site include a communal camp fire circle, available to groups staying on site; a Gambian Roundhouse located adjacent to the pond which can be used by those camping on the site or those undertaking water activities; Tubby's Tuck, a shop selling refreshments and souvenirs which opens at the campers request and an outdoor Wood Chapel for spiritual reflection regardless of religion or belief. In 2019 the Hampshire Scouts Heritage Centre museum, run by volunteers, opened on the site and is available to be booked by campers and day visitors.

A separate wooden building, Dilly's Den, is located near the Croft and is available for training, indoor activities and rifle shooting but is not permitted as an indoor accommodation space, due to planning constraints declaring this a lecture room and storage space.

=== The Croft ===
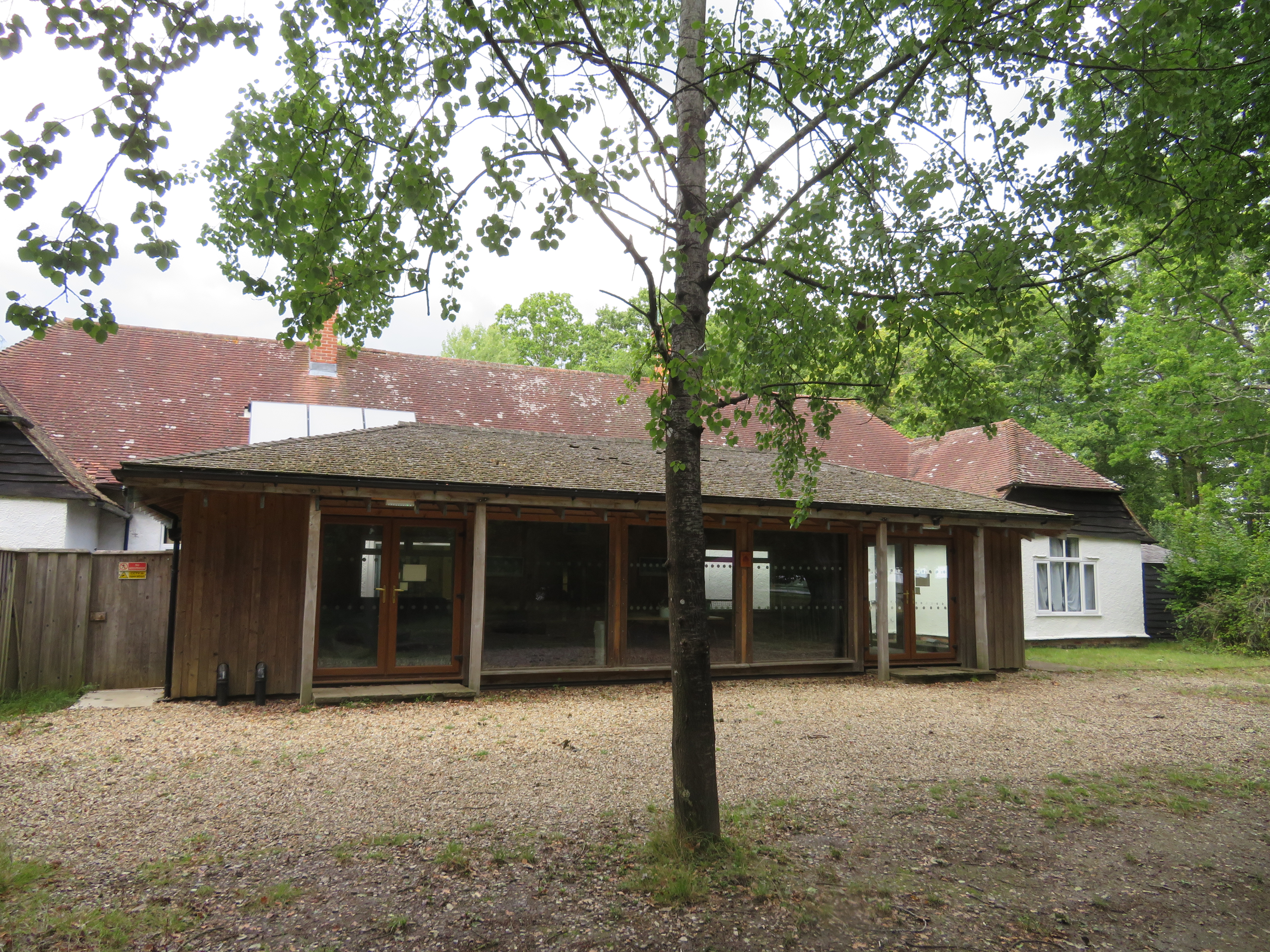
The Sky High Conservatory at the rear of and connected to the Croft Centre

The Croft Centre is the original building on site containing an accommodation wing with 32 beds, wet rooms, kitchen and main hall for dining and activities. It is located close to many of the site's facilities and areas with the quiet area, Hampshire Scouts Heritage Centre and Tuck Shop all located immediately around the building. It has access to a small field and campfire circle on its southern side. It has been re-modelled and extended to the West in 1991 and 2008 which now includes the Hampshire Scouts county office, site reception and accommodation for the on site instructors.

Extending to the South of the main hall of the Croft is the Sky High Conservatory, a high quality activity and lecture room including underfloor heating. As an extension to the Croft centre it can be used in tandem with the main hall as an additional activity space or can be hired separately and accessed from the site. The Sky High Conservatory was built in 2008 and named to commemorate the Everest Expedition undertaken by Hampshire Scout Expeditions the previous year, which saw Hampshire Scouts becoming the first ever Scouts to stand on the top of Mount Everest.

A section of the West wing of the original building was repurposed in 2009 to become the Inca Suite, a 6-bed self-contained unit with a communal space, kitchen and wet room. It is advertised towards leaders, teachers and supervisors of expeditions.

=== Mountbatten Lodge ===
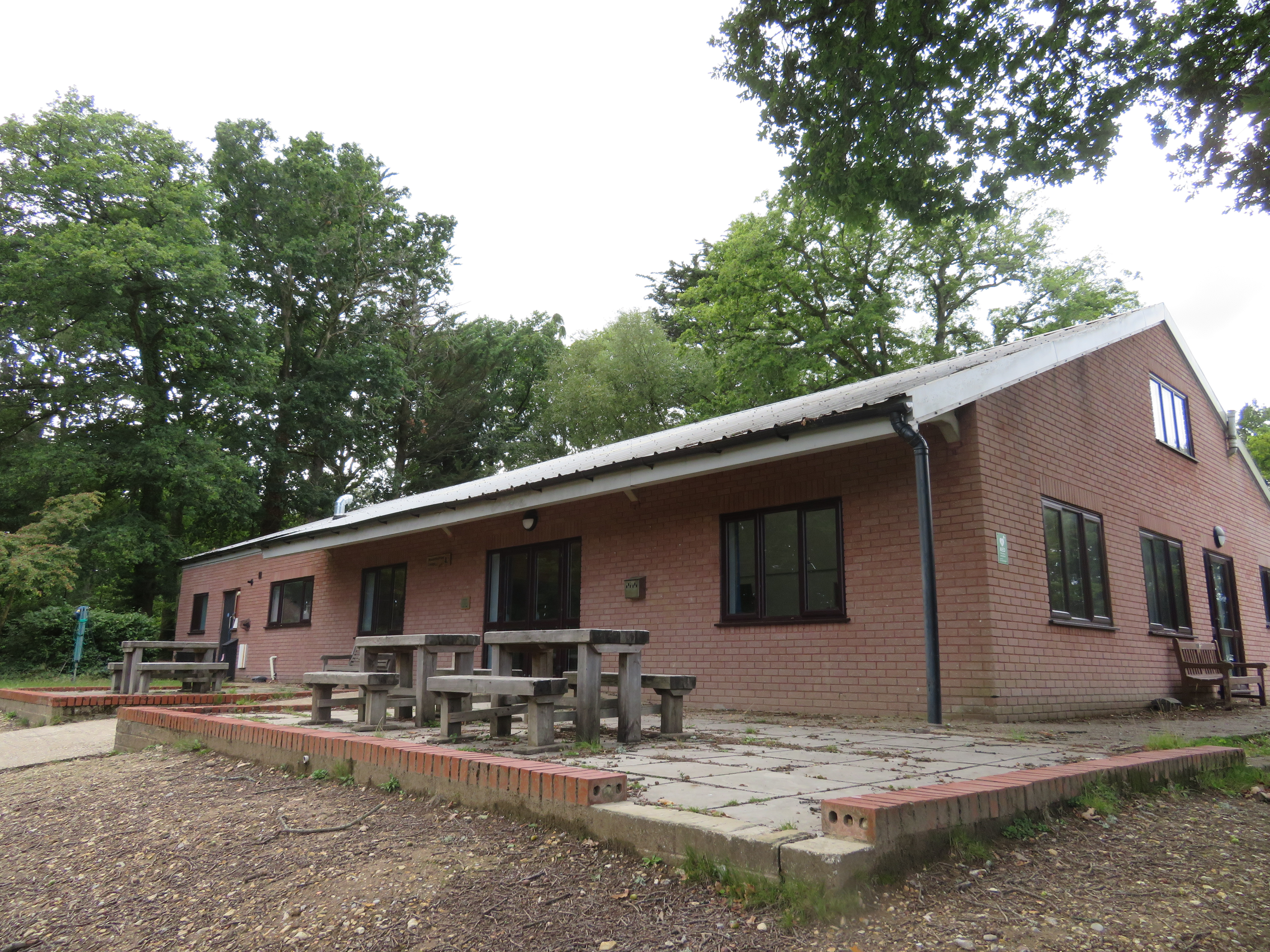
Mountbatten Lodge

Mountbatten Lodge opened in 1986 as a 32-bed accommodation unit designed as a pack holiday centre for the younger Cub Scouts who at that time did not often take part in camping and so required an indoor location for any residential experience. It is located close to the activities area of the site with a primary front and patio that overlooks the main camping field. In addition to the 32 beds it is equipped with a spacious double-height main hall, adjoining kitchen, toilets and wet rooms. It was fully refurbished in the 2016 and 2017 winter seasons to update elements.

The building also contains an upstairs room, accessed via external staircase, which served as the Hampshire Scouts County Office from the building's opening in 1986 until 2007 when they moved into the former Warden's flat in the Croft centre. It has since been used as storage.

== Activities ==
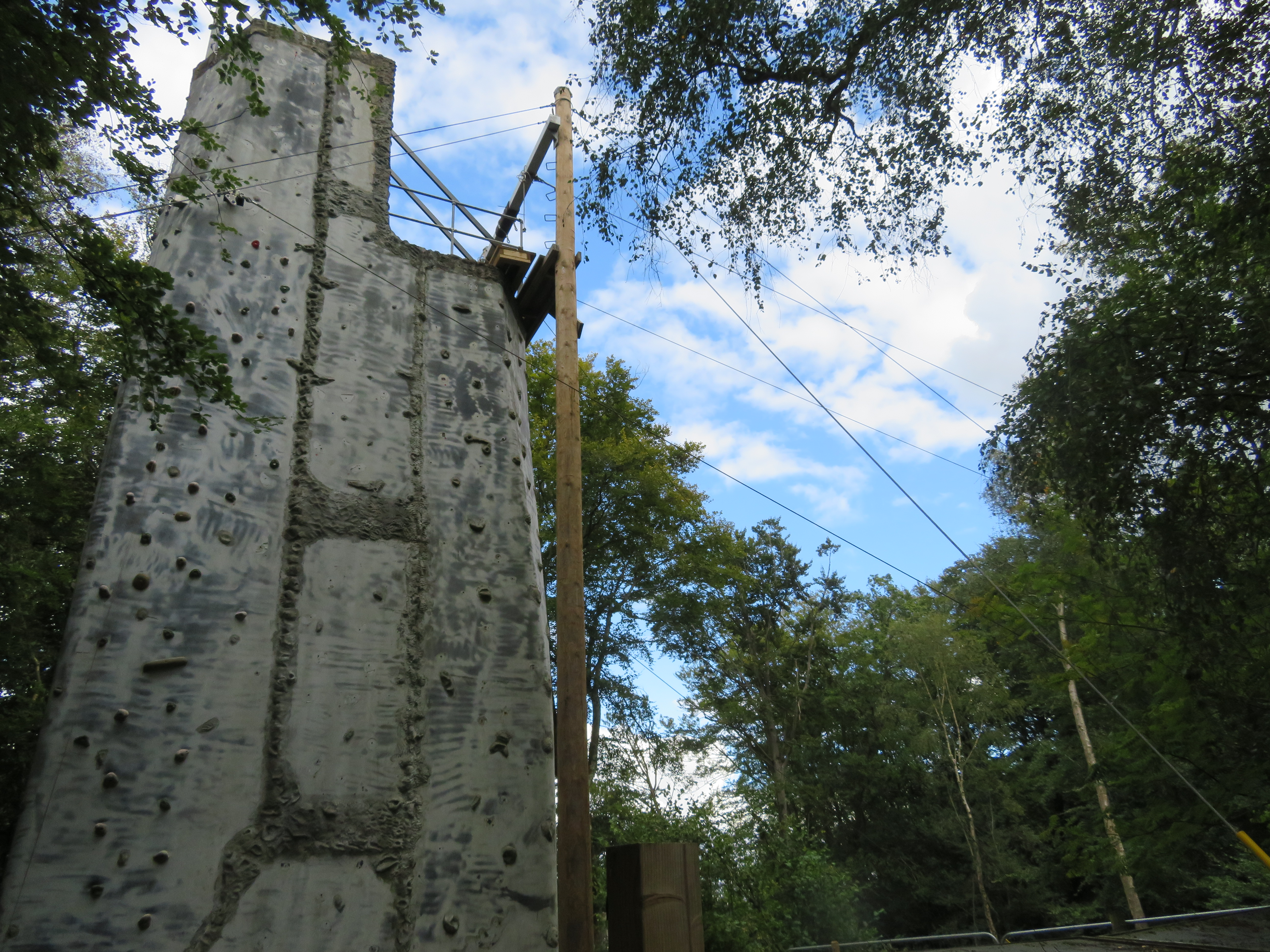
The Mega Tower climbing tower and zip line

As a Scout Activity centre, the site offers a number of adventurous activities for guests on site or for those visiting to use the activities specifically. A number of these are concentrated in the North East corner of the site, designated the Adventure Zone, although others take place at other locations across the site. Activities can be offered by the site instructors or suitable trained and approved leaders in the Scouts.

Harnessed activities include a variety of high ropes activities, crate stacking and climbing on two artificial climbing walls which also accommodate abseiling, bouldering and a zip line. Target activities offered include archery, tomahawk throwing and air rifle shooting. Water activities are limited to raft building and kayaking due to the relative small size of the pond on site. Other notable instructor-led activity sessions include backwoods cooking, shelter building, low ropes, pedal go-karts and zorbing.

In addition to these activities other experiences are available for leaders to run including mountain biking, adventure course, aeroball, crazy golf, use of a pizza oven, pioneering, orienteering and other trails. Sports available on site include frisbee golf, volleyball and table tennis.

== See also ==
- Scouting in South East England
- Scouting in South West England
