= Downe Scout Activity Centre =

Scout site in Downe, Greater London

Downe
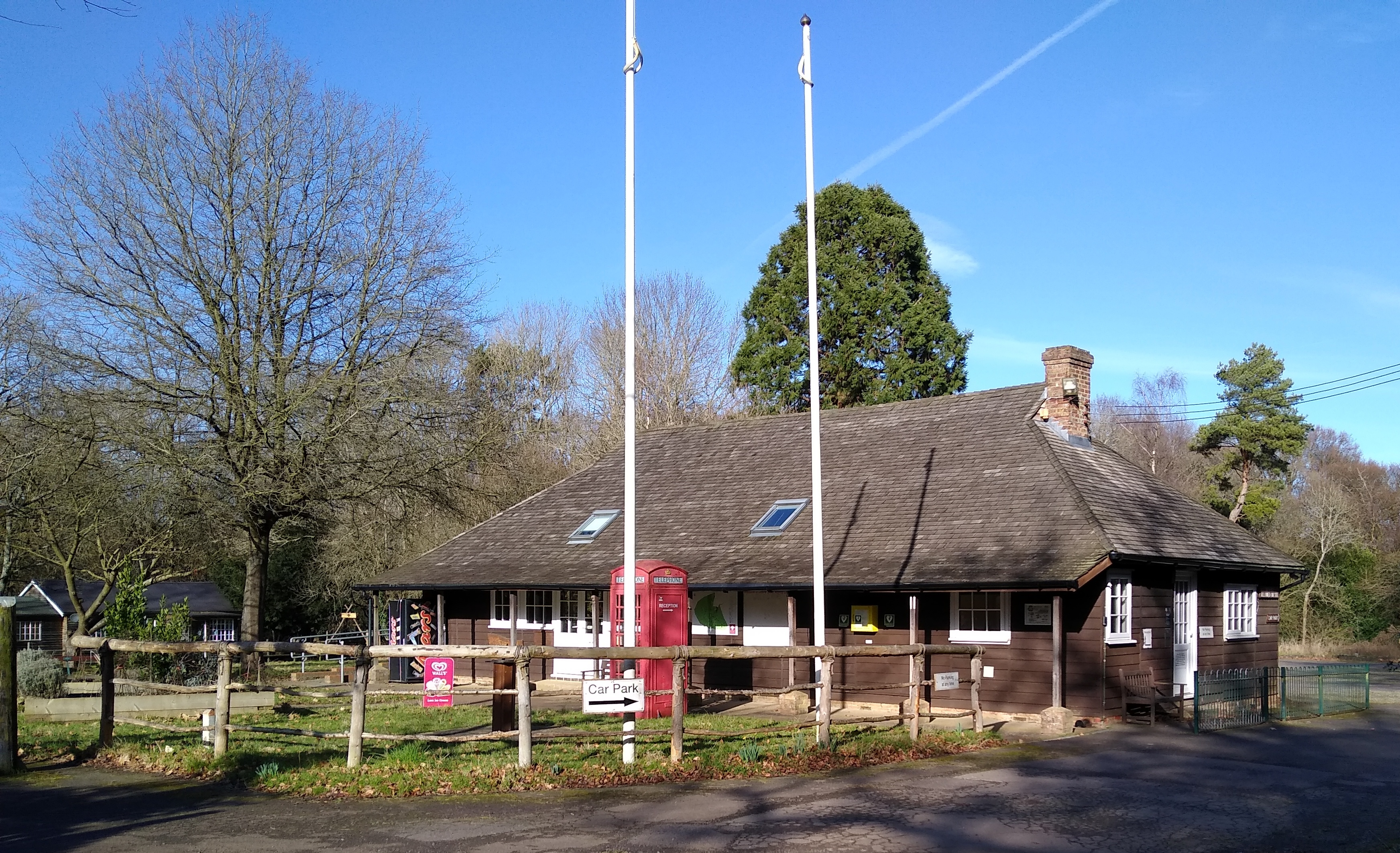
- Owner: Friends of Downe Activity Centre (FoDAC)
- Location: Orpington, Greater London
- Country: United Kingdom
- Coordinates: 51.3216019°N 0.0511176°W
- Camp size: 86 acres
- Founded: 1929
- Website https://downeactivitycentre.org.uk/

Downe Scout Activity Centre was one of the National Scout Activity Centres under the direct control of The Scout Association in Downe near Orpington, Greater London. It provided camping and indoor accommodations for Scouts and Guides.

The Downe site of 86 acres is 16 miles (26 km) from the centre of London near the Biggin Hill airfield.

In November 2020 the Scout Association announced their intention to sell the site. The Scout Association said it would do everything possible "to make sure that the legacies are honoured and heritage preserved"

In July 2021, The Scout Association trustees unanimously agreed to sell Downe Activity Centre to Friends of Downe Activity Centre (FoDAC), a Charitable Incorporated Organisation (Registered Charity Number 1194761). FoDAC aimed to preserve the site for future generations of young people.

However, negotiations stalled, and an agreement could not be reached. The Scout Association then attempted to sell the site to two other parties, but both sales fell through.

In December 2023, Friends of Downe were invited to submit a new bid. The Scout Association later announced plans to auction the site in mid-February 2024 but allowed Friends of Downe to continue their bid alongside the auction process. Notably, since June 2022, the entire site has been protected under a Tree Protection Order (TPO).

By April 2024, Friends of Downe Activity Centre reached an agreement with The Scout Association and signed a contract for the site's purchase. The sale was officially completed in October 2024, and the site was renamed Downe Activity Centre..

== History ==
Downe Camp, close to Orpington, opened in 1929 as a Scoutmasters' Training Ground. From 1933 it was available to Scout Groups and the site offered camping and some activities, including swimming. This was possible by the construction of a swimming pool which was funded by the proceeds from the very first Gang Show, which was organised by Ralph Reader for this very purpose.

Charles Darwin lived in the road along from Downe House and undertook his famous worm experiments on at least two areas of the site.

The site was supported by a committee one of whom was Sir Jeremiah Coleman, together with his wife, he donated money to build the Providore as their golden wedding anniversary gift. They also donated the clock from their stable block and paid for the tower around it.

Located adjacent to Biggin Hill Airport, Downe Scout Camp was used as a base for the Home Guard during World War II and required considerable efforts by working parties of Rover Scouts in the late 1940s to return it to a Scout camp ground.

Greater London South East Scouts assumed control and management of the site in 1987. However, in 2005, the site was renamed as Downe Activity Centre and became one of the National Scout Activity Centres under the direct control of The Scout Association.

The site was used as part of a Blue Peter special which aired on 20 February 2007 to promote the Scouting 2007 Centenary. Over 100 Cub Scouts, Scouts and Explorer Scouts were present on the camp, along with the TV crew who joined in with all of the activities.

A series of international camps called Campdowne have been held at the site, the first was in 1989, followed by 1992, 1996, 2000, 2004, 2008 and the most recent in 2013. Campdowne has been attended by Scouts and Guides from all over the world, set in both the woodland and open fields the camps offered a ten day programme of events and activities.

== See also ==
- Baden-Powell House
- Gilwell Park
- Summer camp
- Youlbury Scout Activity Centre
