= Newgate Street, Hertfordshire =

Coordinates: 51.728574°N 0.116405°W

Newgate Street
- Village
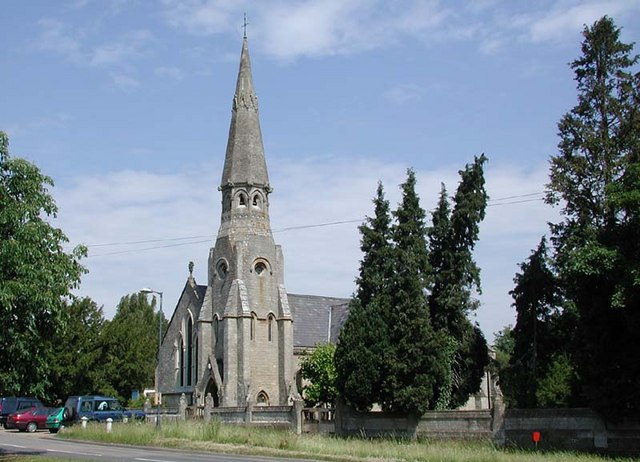
- Ponsbourne St Mary's Church, Newgate Street

- Location within Hertfordshire
- Population: 400
- OS grid reference: TL305045
- District: Welwyn Hatfield
- Shire county: Hertfordshire
- Region: East
- Country: England
- Sovereign state: United Kingdom
- Post town: HERTFORD
- Postcode district: SG13
- Dialling code: 01707
- Police: Hertfordshire
- Fire: Hertfordshire
- Ambulance: East of England
- UK Parliament: Welwyn Hatfield

Newgate Street is a village near Cuffley, in Hatfield civil parish, in the Welwyn Hatfield district of Hertfordshire, England. It is approximately six miles south-west of Hertford and has a population of 400. At the 2011 Census the population was included in the town of Hatfield.

The village has an Anglican church, a school (Ponsbourne St Mary's), a restaurant (The Gables), two pubs (The Crown and The Coach and Horses) and a hotel (Ponsbourne Park Hotel). There is also a small town hall and two outdoor tennis courts.

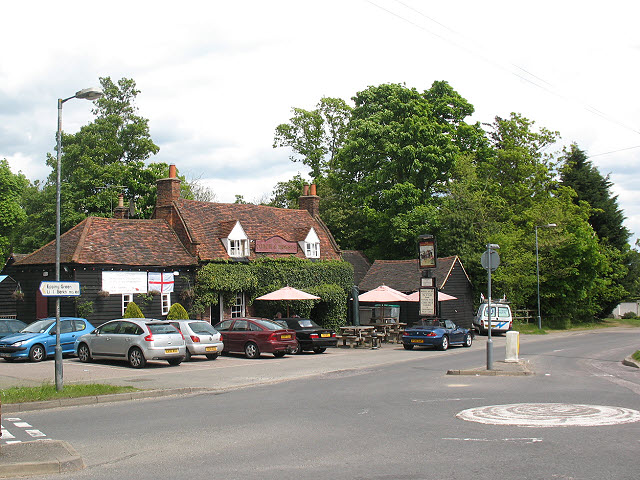
The Coach and Horses public house

Originally in the Manor of Tolmers, the present Tolmers Park House dates from 1761. Since World War I it has been used as a military hospital, a girls' boarding school, a geriatric hospital and has now been converted to luxury apartments. Part of the estate became Tolmers Scout Camp in 1940. The house lies just to the South-West of the village.
