= Scouting in East of England =

Scouting in East of England is about Scouting in the official region of East of England. It is largely represented by The Scout Association of the United Kingdom and some Groups of traditional Scouting including the Baden-Powell Scouts' Association.

There are four student associations at various universities in the region, each of which is affiliated to the Student Scout and Guide Organisation (SSAGO). These are Cambridge University Scout and Guide Club, SSAGO University of East Anglia., Essex SSAGO and Hertfordshire University Guides and Scouts

== History of Scouting in East of England ==
The 1st Bury St Edmunds Scout Group holds a registration certificate dated to 5 February 1908, and the Group claims to be the oldest surviving Scout Group in England. However, this claim is not currently upheld by The Scout Association.

1st Southwold Scout Group was established in 1908 and claims to be the first Scout group established in Suffolk. 1st Reydon and 1st Wrentham in Suffolk also existed in 1908. In Norfolk, 1st Norwich Sea Scouts and 1st Dereham Scout Group were also founded in 1908, making them some of the earliest Scout groups to have formed. Hertfordshire was the first organised Scout County, which was founded by Sir Percy Winn Everett at the request of Baden-Powell. The first Hertfordshire Scout Troop was founded on 20 February 1908.

The 21st World Scout Jamboree, celebrating 100 years of Scouting, was held at Chelmsford in Essex between 27 July and 8 August 2007.

== The Scout Association Counties ==
Scouting in the East of England is led by a Regional Lead Volunteer who is appointed to lead Scouting in the East of England. The Scout Association in East of England is administered through six Scout Counties

=== Bedfordshire Scout County ===
Scout County badge for Bedfordshire

Bedfordshire Scout County is a Scout County of The Scout Association of the United Kingdom. It is concurrent with the political county of Bedfordshire, and provides Scouting opportunities for young people and adults in the area around Bedford, Luton, and Dunstable.

The badge worn by members of the Bedfordshire Scout County shows a red falcon on a yellow background. The current version of the badge was phased in over a ten-year period, starting in the early 1980s. It replaced a previous version which had either a silver or gold falcon on a green background.

The county currently has 2 County Scout Networks (Bedfordshire County Scout Network & Bedfordshire Air Scout Network) and 5 Local Scout Networks

The county is currently divided into nine Scout Districts.

- Ampthill and Woburn
- Bedford
- Biggleswade & District
- Dunstable
- Icknield (Luton)
- Lea Valley (Luton)
- Leighton-Linslade
- Ouse Valley
- Someries (Luton)

Total membership of Bedfordshire Scout County was 6,271 at January 2012.

=== Cambridgeshire Scout County ===
Scout County badge for Cambridgeshire

Cambridgeshire Scout County is a Scout County of The Scout Association of the United Kingdom. It provides Scouting opportunities for young people and adults in the area and more information, plus the latest news and how to join are on the County website.

Scouts in Peterborough were given the Freedom of the City in April 2007. This is the first occasion in Britain when Scouts have received this type of award.

The badge worn by members of the Cambridgeshire Scout County is unusual in its design, as it is shaped as a shield rather than the more standard rectangle. The elements on the badge represent towns covered by the Scout County, the cross-keys representing Peterborough.

The county is currently divided into eight Scout Districts:, following the disbanding of Granta District at the end of 2012:

- Cambridge District
- Cambridge Crafts Hill District
- Cromwell District
- Ely District
- Fenland District
- Hinchingbrooke District
- Newmarket District
- Peterborough District (Nene and Medehamstede Districts merged in September 2017)

The current County Commissioner for Cambridgeshire is Chris Ward. Membership of Cambridgeshire Scout County in 2020 stood at approximately 5,550 young people and 2,200 adults.

==== CamJam ====
In 2006 the Cambridgeshire Jamboree moved from the East of England Showground, in Peterborough, to the Huntingdon Racecourse. CamJam 2006 was the fifth such jamboree to be arranged by Cambridgeshire Scout County.

On site activities included go-karts, a skate park, ice rink, a planetarium, climbing walls, radio controlled cars, caving and hot air balloons on two evenings. Other activities included archery, rifle shooting, model land yachts, car mechanics, scavenger hunt and model aircraft.

CamJam returned to Huntingdon Racecourse from 27 July–3 August 2019, and planning is currently underway for 2027.

=== Essex Scout County ===
Scout County badge for Essex

Essex Scout County is a Scout County of The Scout Association in the United Kingdom.

Chelmsford in Essex was the location for the 21st World Scout Jamboree, held between 27 July to 8 August 2007. The Chelmsford District had a number of special events. By 2007 there were 16,000 members in Essex Scouting covering every community in the county.

The County HQ is at the Thriftwood Training Centre.

The badge worn by members of the Essex Scout County shows the heraldry of the regional county of Essex of "Gules three Seaxes fessewise in pale Argent pomels and hilts Or points to the sinister and cutting edges upwards.".

The county is currently divided into 19 Scout Districts:

- Basildon
- Billericay and Wickford
- Braintree
- Brentwood
- Castle Point
- Chelmsford
- Colchester Estuary
- Colchester North
- Crouch Valley
- Halstead and Colne Valley
- Harlow & District
- Hatfield Forest
- Maldon and East Essex
- Royal Forest
- Saffron Walden
- Southend Estuary
- Southend West
- Tendring
- Thurrock

The current County Commissioner is Bob Bye. Membership of Essex Scout County was 15,700 young people and 4,335 adults in January 2020.

==== Essex International Jamboree ====
The Essex International Jamboree (EIJ) was first held in 1927 when it was visited by the Founder, and then Chief Scout, Sir Robert Baden-Powell. Essex have held jamborees every four years since 1952 and at their last site, Devereux Farm, Kirby-le-Soken, from 1996 to 2008. In 2012 a new site was established at Boyton Cross near Roxwell, Chelmsford following coastal erosion and an increasing flood risk at the Kirby Le Soken site. It is organised jointly by Essex Scouts and the Guide Counties of Essex West, Essex North East and Essex South East.

The Essex International Jamboree 2008 was held between 26 July and 2 August. Over 8,000 participants and 2,000 staff attended the jamboree representing 30 different countries, including: Canada, Denmark, Egypt, Finland, Germany, Ghana, Gibraltar, Ireland, Israel, Kenya, Nigeria, Norway, Pakistan, Palestinian Territories, Romania, Spain, Sweden, Turkey, Uganda, UK, USA and Zimbabwe. Another 4,000 people, including hundreds of Cub Scouts and Brownies were hosted for the jamboree open day. The theme for 2008 was "The World's Endangered Animals" and included a strong emphasis for 'green issues' such as recycling and developing global links. In keeping with the theme, the site was sub-divided into 10 sub-camps containing a mixture of UK and international Scouts and Guides, with a further sub-camp for staff. Each of the participant sub-camps was named after an endangered animal. All of the animals could be found at the nearby Colchester Zoo, and each sub-camp became involved in the zoo's adoption scheme as a lasting legacy of the event.

Essex International Jamboree 2012 at the new site at Boyton Cross and was attended by over 8,000 Scouts and Guides with over 1,500 adult volunteers on the staff team. The 2016 Essex International Jamboree held between 30 July and 6 August with the theme "Our Changing World", was attended by about 10,000 Scouts and Guides and was run by a team of 2,000 adult volunteers. The 2020 Essex International Jamboree was cancelled due to the Coronavirus outbreak. The 2024 Essex International Jamboree was held between 27 July and 3 August 2024.

=== Hertfordshire Scout County ===
Scout County badge for Hertfordshire

Hertfordshire Scout County is a Scout County of The Scout Association in the United Kingdom covering the County of Hertfordshire.

The badge worn by members of the Hertfordshire Scout County shows a hart on a blue background, which is based on the heraldry of the regional county of Hertfordshire.

They have a Falke SF25C motor glider which is based at the Cambridge Gliding Centre.

There are 18 Scout Districts

- Bishops Stortford
- Watford South
- East Herts
- Elstree and District
- Harpenden and Wheathampstead
- Hemel Hempstead
- Hertford
- Hitchin
- Letchworth and Baldock
- Watford North
- Potters Bar
- Rickmansworth and Chorleywood
- Royston
- St Albans
- Stevenage
- Ware and District
- Mid Herts
- West Herts

The youth membership of Hertfordshire Scout County in January 2017 was 14,434 of whom 3,106 were girls. There were 4,518 adult leaders.

==== Hertfordshire Scouts Peak Assault ====
Herts Peak Assault is a navigational and teamwork challenge for Explorer and Network Scouts, held at a different location each year. Groups must navigate their way around, visiting 'checkpoints' within the given time limit.

- 2006: 13–15 October 2006 Howgill Fells, (Sedbergh) Cumbria
- 2007: 12–14 October 2007 Northern Fells, (Caldbeck) Cumbria
- 2008: 17–19 October 2008 Llanthony, Black Mountains, Wales
- 2009: 16–18 October 2009 Abercraf, Black Mountains, Wales

=== Norfolk Scout County ===
Scout County badge for Norfolk

Norfolk Scout County is a Scout County of The Scout Association in the United Kingdom, covering the county of Norfolk.

There is a Norfolk Scout Canoe Team. The badge worn by members of the Norfolk Scout County shows the shield from the coat of arms of the county of Norfolk. The current version of the badge has a light green background, whilst earlier versions had been black.

The Norfolk Scout County is divided into eight Scout Districts:

- Central Norfolk
- North East Norfolk
- Northern Norwich
- Eastern Norwich
- North West Norfolk
- East Norfolk
- Southern Norwich
- Southern Norfolk

==== Norfolk International Jamboree ====
In 1960 the Norfolk Boy Scouts International Jamboree, held at Sennowe Park near Fakenham, drew media attention due to the presence of fifty "European refugees."

The 12th Norfolk International Jamboree (NorJam) was held at the Royal Norfolk Showground between Saturday 29 July and Saturday 5 August 2006.

Around 5,000 participants and staff attended the jamboree representing 17 different countries, including: Austria, Australia, Denmark, UK, US and Spain. Three Guides were presented with their Queen's Guide Award by the Chief Guide, Liz Burnley, during the camp. The Jamboree included a Christmas celebration, held on Thursday 3 August. Other activities included scuba diving, horse-riding and sailing.

The theme for the 2006 Jamboree was "Around The World In Seven Days", with each sub-camp being named after a famous landmark, and the event included a strong emphasis on current issues such as recycling and developing global links.

In 2010 the theme for the Jamboree was "The Modern World", each sub-camp was named after an innovation or issue affecting society in the modern age. The 2018 theme was "Decades of Fun", with sub camps named after a decade from the 1940s to the 2000s.

NorJam is held every four years, with the next one due to take place in 2026, with the 2022 event cancelled due to COVID-19 pandemic concerns.

==== Norfolk Air Scouts Centre ====
Norfolk Scouts used to own Vickers Valetta XV580, which was used as an Air Scout activity centre at Norwich Airport. The aircraft is now owned by the Norfolk & Suffolk Aviation Museum.

==== Sea Scout vessels ====
A number of Sea Scout units operate in the county, and MTB 102, one of few surviving motor torpedo boats that served with the Coastal Forces of the Royal Navy in the Second World War was owned by 1st Blofield and Brundall Sea Scout Group from 1973 to 1995.

=== Suffolk Scout County ===
Scout County badge for Suffolk

Suffolk Scout County is a Scout County of The Scout Association of the United Kingdom. It is concurrent with the political county of Suffolk (with the exception of Newmarket whose Scout Groups are associated with Cambridgeshire Scout County).

The badge worn by members of the Suffolk Scout County shows a crown "enfiled by a pair of Arrows in saltire points downwards", which is an element from the heraldry of the regional county of Suffolk. The pierced crown relates to the martyrdom of Saint Edmund by the Danes in 849.

The county is currently divided into eight Scout Districts:

- Bury St. Edmunds
- Deben
- Lowestoft
- Orwell
- Stowmarket
- Sudbury
- Waveney Valley
- Wolsey

Membership of Suffolk Scout County was quoted as "over 6000 young people aged 6-25" in 2012.

== Baden-Powell Scout Association ==
Area badge as worn on the uniform of Scouting members

The East Anglia Area is part of the Baden-Powell Scout Association. The Association is represented in Norfolk by the Fakenham Lancaster B-P Air Scouts and the Four Feathers B-P Scouts, and with other groups in the surrounding counties.
The badge worn by members of the Baden-Powell Scouts East Anglia Area shows the arms of the Wuffingas Dynasty on a shield. The Wuffingas were the ruling family of the East Angles. Their last king was Saint Edmund, King and Martyr, who was murdered by the Vikings in 849 and was later canonised.

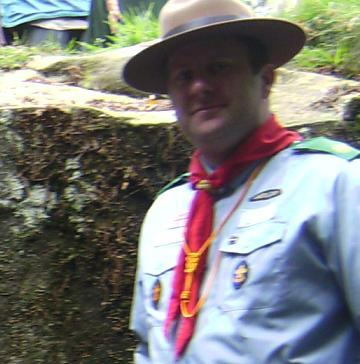

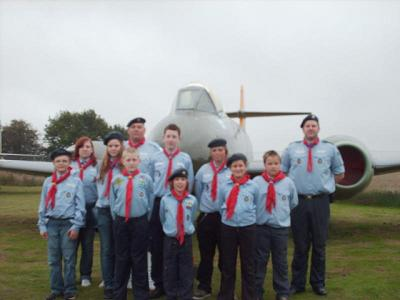

== Pathfinder and Rover Explorer Scouts' Association ==
The Pathfinder Scouts Association operates the 1st Bedfordshire Scout Troop at Houghton Regis, Bedfordshire, while the Rover Explorer Scout Association operates a Rover Crew in Lowestoft, Suffolk.

== European Scout Federation (British Association) ==
The European Scout Federation (Fédération du Scoutisme Européen) operate in the East of England, with groups operating in Cambridgeshire and Essex.

== The British Boy Scouts ==
The British Boy Scouts operated Groups in Norfolk, including the 1st Norwich (St Marks) Group, although these were closed by 1999.

== Campsites ==
=== Bedfordshire ===
The Bedfordshire Scout Association County has a large campsite and training centre, three District maintained campsites and three group maintained campsites.

- The Leslie Sell County Scout Training and Activity Centre. This campsite is near the village of Bromham, 4 miles (6.4 km) northwest of Bedford. There are 8 acres (32,000 m^{2}) of open fields, and 18 acres (73,000 m^{2}) of woodland on the site, offering a variety of camping locations. As well as the camping areas, there are a small number of buildings offering accommodation and training facilities. The site offers a number of activities, including pioneering, archery, and air rifle shooting.

==== District Campsites ====
- Boyd Campsite, Henlow, run by Biggleswade District.
- Jordans Close Scout Activity Centre, Great Barford, run by Bedford District.
- Milton Bryan Campsite, Milton Bryan, Ampthill Rural District, run by Ampthill & Woburn District.

=== Cambridgeshire ===
There are 9 camp sites and buildings available to hire across Cambridgeshire, full details of which are on the County website

=== Essex ===
Essex has several camp sites including:

- Thriftwood County Training Centre.
- Thriftwood Scout Camp & Activity Centre: opened in 1957, the 76 acres (31 hectares) site near Brentwood is owned and managed by the Scout Districts of Brentwood (Essex), Barking & Dagenham, Hornchurch and Squirrels Heath (Greater London North East).
- Belchamps Scout Centre: a 30-acre (12-hectare) site near Hawkwell in Essex, managed by Castle Point, Crouch Valley, Southend Estuary and Southend West Scout Association Districts.
- Skreens Park. The Essex County Scout Council Campsite and Activity Centre, located five miles (8.0 km) west of the County Town of Chelmsford, consists of 52 acres (21 ha) of historic parkland which is part of the original Skreens Manor. It is located within 2 miles (3.2 km) of Hylands Park, which was the site of the 2005 European Scout Jamboree and the 21st World Scout Jamboree. The Site has hosted "GiGa Camp", a weekend activity camp for Scouts and Guides, with over 1,300 participants in 2006.
- Thorrington Scout Camp is owned and managed by Colchester Estuary District Scouts and Colchester North District Scouts. Opened in 1937, it has 27 acres (11 hectares) of woodland and is 7 miles (11 kilometres) from Colchester.

=== Hertfordshire ===
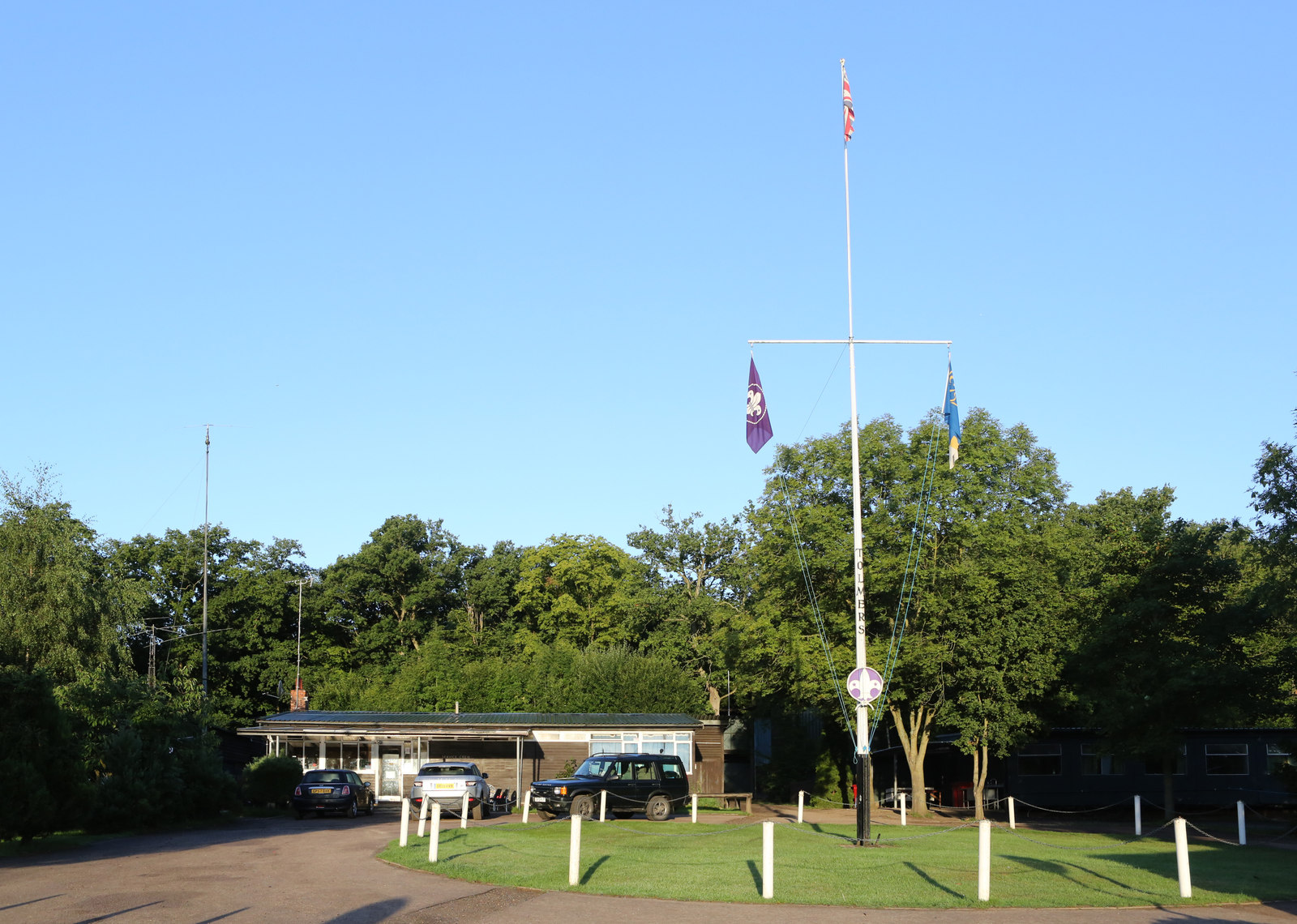
Tolmers Scout Camp & Activity Centre at Cuffley.

Hertfordshire County Scout Council of the Scout Association is the owner of four activity centres in Hertfordshire and one in Scotland.

- Tolmers Scout Camp & Activity Centre. Tolmers, located near Cuffley in Hertfordshire, provides camping facilities and activities for Scouts and Guides, and is also used by schools, other youth organisations and for corporate team building. The campsite covers 40 hectares of countryside, comprising about 12 hectares of woodland and 28 hectares of meadow with a small lake (Berts Pool) which is used for water activities. As well as the camping areas, there are three buildings, offering accommodation and training facilities. The site offers a number of activities, including orienteering, climbing, archery, and air rifle shooting. Tolmers is about 20 km north of the centre of London and 1.5 km from Cuffley railway station. Initiated in 1979, "Come To Tolmers" has become the main event in the Tolmers calendar. Originally it was designed by Scout HQ to provide an activity camp for Scouts who had no traditional summer camp. Today, more than 2,000 Scouts and Guides from all over Europe take part every year.

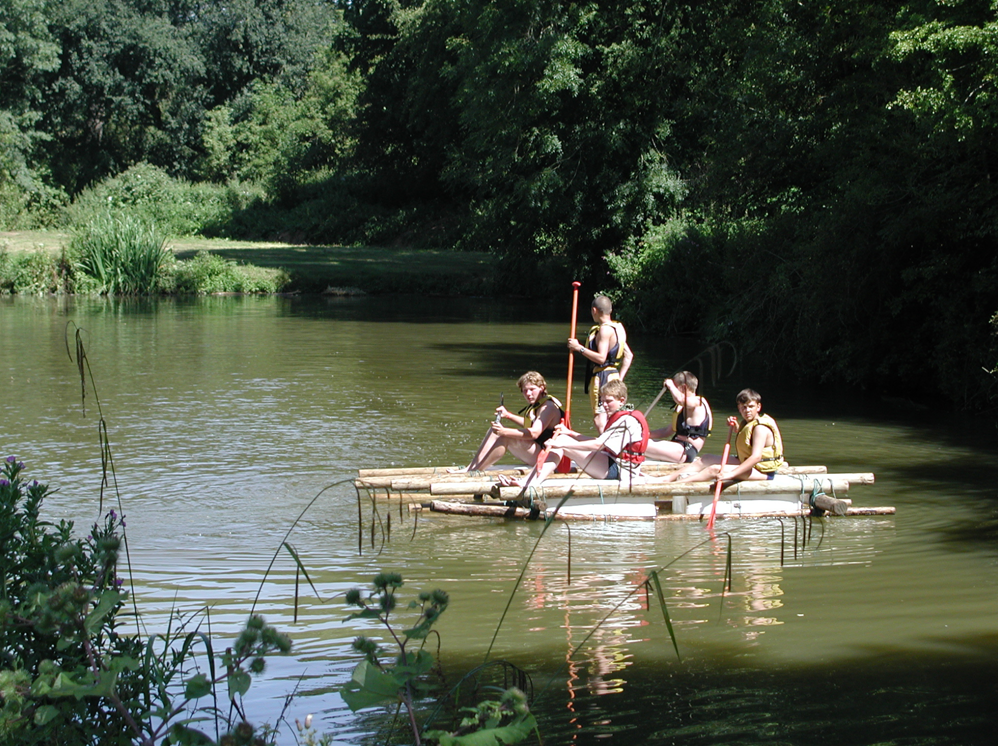
Scouts rafting on Bert's Pool at Tolmers Scout Camp.

  - History of Tolmers Scout Camp and Activity Centre

The land occupied by the campsite was purchased from Tolmers Park Estate in 1939, with the aim of completing a ring of Headquarters’ campsites around London. The site was bought for £4,600 of which £2,000 was donated anonymously by a "Mr B", and the balance of £2,600 came from the Gang Show fund.

It was officially opened on 11 May 1940, 800 Scouts and visitors attended, despite wartime restrictions. The opening was performed by Baron Wigram, a distinguished member of the Council of the Boy Scouts Association and former private secretary to King George V. Sir Percy Winn Everett, the Deputy Chief Commissioner, read a letter from Lord Baden-Powell wishing he "could be there in person to support you on the opening of Tolmers". Almost immediately afterwards, Tolmers temporarily lost the use of the site apart from the Brick Field and the Valley Field, as it was requisitioned by the Ministry of Food. Defence works, including pill boxes, tank traps and barbed wire entanglements were constructed along Cuffley Brook, as part of the Outer London Defence Ring.

After the war, development of Tolmers continued and all the requisitioned land was returned by the end of the 1950s. The site was very popular with Scout troops from North London who came by train to Cuffley Station, often hauling their equipment the rest of the way in trek carts. By 1970, flush toilets had been installed, work had started on a hut for Cub Scouts and the camp centre had moved to its present position.

The original service crew were the Cuffley Rover Scout Crew, led by Ron Erwood. They were responsible for a great deal of the work in 1939-1940 prior to the official opening of the campsite. Before long, Rovers and Scouters from across North London joined them. In 1964, a system of five separate crews began, ensuring a team of volunteers was available every weekend. In 1968, the first female service crew members joined. Today, the service crew has over 100 active members.

Bert Longdon, the camp warden from 1964, envisaged the creation of a small lake by damming Cuffley Brook. In 1976, a licence was granted by Thames Water Authority for the flow of the brook to be impeded "by means of a weir" and to create "a pond suitable for canoe instruction" with a capacity of 120,000 gallons. Bert died in 1977 before any work could be done, but it was completed as his memorial, and the first Scouts canoed on it at Easter 1980.

In January 1953, work started on a plantation of Scots pines in the Main Field, in the shape of the new Queen's cypher; EIIR. Despite damage by the storms of 1987 and 1990, the original shape is still clearly visible.

- Phasels Wood Scout Camp & Activity Centre

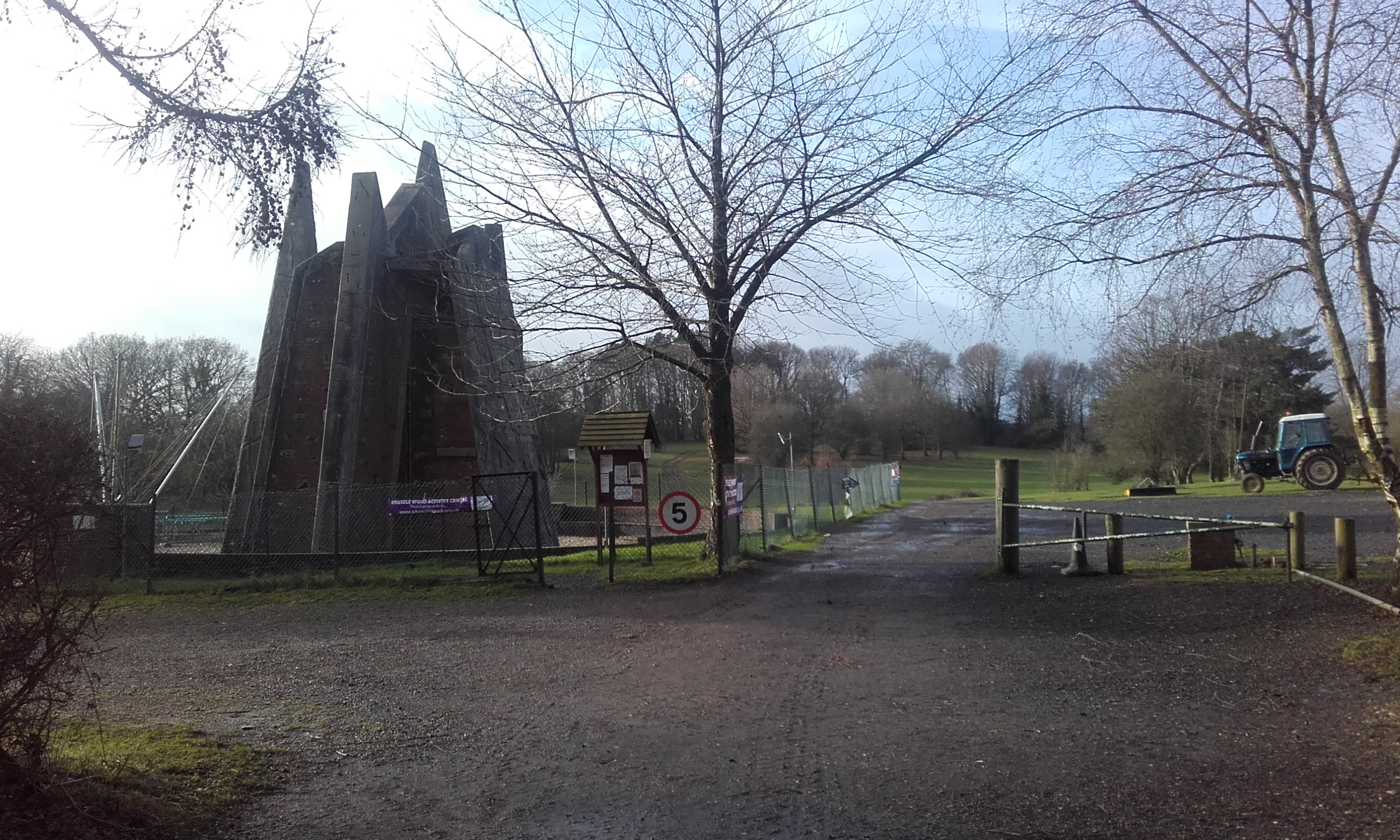
Phasels Wood Scout Camp & Activity Centre near King's Langley, Hertfordshire.

Phasels Wood lies between Kings Langley and Hemel Hempstead and can be accessed directly from the A41 Aylesbury road, close to Junction 19 of the M25 motorway. The campsite covers 95 acres (35 hectares): 30 acres (12 hectares) of meadow, 30 acres of woodland and a 35-acre (14 hectares) field. Phasels Wood was purchased by Scout Headquarters in 1937 and was opened on 30 May of that year, when Sir Percy Everett planted an oak tree. Management of the site passed to Hertfordshire Scout County in 1987. In May 1991, a new climbing tower was opened at a cost of £117,500; at that time, it was the tallest in England. In 1995, a further 10 acres (4 hectares) were added, giving access to the A41 Kings Langley By-Pass.

- Well End Scout Activity Centre

The centre is in the hamlet of Well End, between Borehamwood and Shenley. It has 5 acres (2.0 hectares) of camping fields and 4 acres (1.6 hectares) of woodland. Well End is the training centre for Hertfordshire Scouts and was opened on 3 June 1933. Lord Baden-Powell later visited the site and planted a horse chestnut tree.

- Harmergreen Wood near Welwyn is 44-acre (18-hectare) site with 15 camping glades set in ancient woodland and an 18-bed indoor facility.
- Lochearnhead Wild Country Centre in the Loch Lomond & The Trossachs National Park in Scotland; it is the former Lochearnhead railway station, adapted to cater for up to 90 people as a base for adventurous activities in the hills.

In 2015, the Hertfordshire County Scout Executive Committee decided not to renew the leases on Orchard Farm Wild Country Centre (in Staffordshire) and Coetmor Mill Wild Country Centre (in North Wales) because of escalating costs.

All Hertfordshire Scout Association Activity Centres are members of the ASGC, the Association of Scout and Guide Centres.

In addition, some smaller Scout campsites in Hertfordshire are operated by Scout Districts. These include:

- Lees Wood near Rickmansworth, which has 7 acres (2.8 hectares) of camping ground with 47 acres (19 hectares) of woodland, with a 28-bed pack holiday centre. It is operated by Watford North District Scouts.
- Wymondley Wood Scout and Guide Centre near Willian has 4 acres (1.6 hectares) of camp site with access to a 20-acre (8-hectare) woodland conservation area, and has a 42-bed building. The centre was opened by George Purdy (the Chief Scout) and Jenny Leach (the Chief Guide) in May 2003. It is jointly operated by Letchworth and Baldock District Scout Council and Letchworth Garden City Guides.

=== Norfolk ===
There are a large number of Scout camp sites in Norfolk and the Scout Association County publishes a directory. These include:

- Eaton Vale Scout and Guide Activity Centre.
- Two Mile Bottom, Thetford Forest, operated by Norfolk County Scouts.
- Garvestone, operated by Central Norfolk District.

An independent site, which has been used by both The Scout Association and the Baden-Powell Scouts' Association, is provided by the Mid-Norfolk Railway at County School railway station.

=== Suffolk ===
There are a number of camp sites in Suffolk including

- Hallowtree Scout Camp, near Ipswich
- Herringfleet Scout Campsite, Ashby.

== Gang Shows ==
- Colchester Gang Show.
- Billericay, Wickford and Basildon Gang Show, started in 1984.
- Cambridge Gang Show is an annual event organised by Cambridge District Scouts.
- Chelmsford Gang Show, started in 1957.
- Ipswich Scouts and Guides Gang Show.
- Letchworth and Baldock District Gang Show.
- Peterborough Gang Show, started in 1947. Celebrated 60th show in 2007.
- St Albans Scout & Guide Gang Show - started in 1980.
- Southend Gang Show - started in 2011.
- Southend Scout and Guide Gang Show, started in 1966.
- Thurrock Gang Show, started in 1968.
- Harpenden & Wheathampstead District Gang Show - started in 1949 by Eric E Thair. One of three Gang Shows currently running in Hertfordshire, this is the longest continuously running Gang Show in the world, as of their 2013 show. (the 2013 show will be the 64th consecutive annual run).

== See also ==
- Age groups in Scouting and Guiding
- Girlguiding Anglia
- Girlguiding Essex South East
- Scouting in Greater London
- Scouting in South East England
- Scouting in the East Midlands
