= Scouting in Scotland =

Scouting in Scotland is largely represented by Scouts Scotland, a registered Scottish Charity No. SC017511 that is affiliated to the Scout Association of the United Kingdom. The Baden-Powell Scouts' Association also has a presence in Scotland.

There are five student associations at various universities in Scotland, each of which is affiliated to the Student Scout and Guide Organisation (SSAGO): Aberdeen University Scouts and Guides (serving University of Aberdeen and Robert Gordon University, University of the Highlands and Islands Guides and Scouts, University of Strathclyde Guides and Scouts, University of Dundee Guides and Scouts, and Glasgow SSAGO (serving Glasgow Caledonian University, Royal Conservatoire of Scotland, Glasgow School of Art, University of Glasgow and University of the West of Scotland).

== History of Scouting in Scotland ==
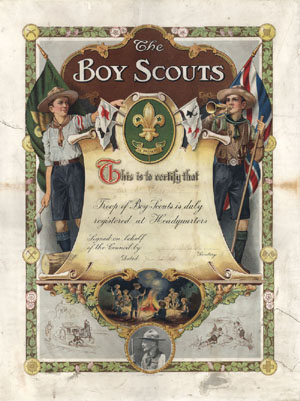
Registration Certificate for The First Glasgow Scout Group, one of the claimants to the title of First Troop

The First Glasgow Scout Group has a claim to be the first Scout Troop, as it holds a registration certificate dated 26 January 1908. No other Scout troop has documentation that pre-dates this.

The 24th Glasgow Scout Group's published history has it forming January 1908, although this is not currently recognised by The Scout Association. The 3rd Glasgow (Waverley) Scout Group are also listed as one of the first Groups to have started in 1908.

Oral tradition (at least as of 1976) was that the 12th Glasgow (1st Lenzie) troop was the first troop outside central Glasgow. The story told by leaders in the mid-70s was that the 12th Glasgow was the second formed but had to take the number 12th as the first 11 numbers were reserved for city troops. The group's own website gives a starting date of May 1908.

It is acknowledged by Scout Headquarters in Gillwell that many Groups were meeting as early as 1907 although registration did not begin until 1908. The 10th Craigalmond Scout Group in Edinburgh (formerly 10th Midlothian and 10th Haymarket) was, for example, meeting in late 1907; and there are a number of other Groups still existing to this day who formed immediately following reports of the camp on Brownsea Island. Until 1919 registration was undertaken by local associations and not centrally.

Mr. Jack Stewart, a former International Commissioner for Scotland, founded the Blair Atholl International Jamborette in 1946. It has been held every two years since that date, with representatives of more than 50 countries attending.

The centenary of Scouting was marked by a debate and reception in the Scottish Parliament initiated by member of the Scottish Parliament, Robert Brown, in December 2007. In December 2024 the first Sudanese Scout troop was established in an attempt to strength of diversity as new groups are set up by minority communities.

== Scouts Scotland ==
Scouts Scotland
- Owner: Scouts Scotland
- Headquarters: Fordell Firs, Fife
- Country: Scotland
- President: Mollie Hughes
- Chief Volunteer: Barry Donald-Hewitt
- Chair: Evelyn Dick
- Chief Executive: Graeme Luke
- Website www.scouts.scot

A Scottish headquarters, at Fordell Firs in Fife, for training, programme and administration in Scotland goes back to 1909. The current Chief Volunteer of Scotland is Barry Donald-Hewitt.

There are 47,260 members in Scotland with 36,358 youth members and 10,902 adult volunteers.

In May 2018 a new strategy called "Our plan for better futures in Scotland" was launched to set out the organisations plans from 2018 – 2025.

Eight new regions of the Scout Association in Scotland were formed on 1 April 2008, by amalgamating the previous Scout Areas.

=== Highlands and Islands Region ===
The Highlands and Islands Region was formed by amalgamating the six previous Scout Areas of Caithness, Inverness, Lochaber, Orkney, Ross and Sutherland, and Western Isles. The old areas are now the six Scout Districts in the Region:

- Caithness & Sutherland
- Inverness, Nairn, Badenoch & Strathspey
- Lochaber
- Orkney
- Ross, Skye & Lochalsh
- Western Isles

=== North East Scotland Region ===
The North East Scotland Region was formed by amalgamating the six previous Scout Areas of Aberdeen, Banff and Buchan, Gordon, Kincardine and Deeside, Moray, and Shetland.

There are now 8 Scout Districts in the Region:

Map of Scotland highlighting the location of Aberdeen

- Aberdeen
- Banff and Buchan was the old Area, with three Districts: Banff District, Buchan District and Turriff District.
- Gordon. Prior to Scottish restructuring in 2008 there were three districts Central, Western and Eastern within Gordon Area.
- Deveron
- Deeside
- Kincardineshire
- Moray. Before 2008, there were four districts: Elgin District, Moray West District, Seafield District and Speyside District.
- Shetland with only one Group.

=== East Scotland Region ===
The East Scotland Region was formed by amalgamating the four previous Scout Areas of Dundee, Fife, Perth and Kinross, and Angus.

The 2nd Fife (Dunfermline) Scout Group was founded in 1908 and is the oldest existing Scout Group in Fife and one of the oldest in Scotland. It also owns one of the most-used Scouting campsites in Fife, Nineacres.

The 81st Fife (1st Broomhall) Sea Scout Group is located in Limekilns, a small village on the Firth of Forth estuary and is the only Sea Scout Group in the East of Scotland region. The Scout Group was founded in 1945 and became a Sea Scout Group in 1952. The group notably wear a blue scout shirt with a yellow and red neckerchief.

The 11th Fife Scout Group is located in Burntisland and are part of Kirkcaldy District. Through newspaper articles showing Scout activities on the Links as well as reviews of Gang Shows, the 11th Fife can trace their history within the town back to 1908 making them one of the oldest Scout Groups in Scotland. The 11th Fife name was adopted in 1919 with the Group celebrating their "official" centenary with numerous Group events and a residential experience for all Sections including Beavers. Cubs, Scouts and Explorers at Lochgoilhead Scout Centre. The 11th Fife continues to be active and are highly visible within the area, regularly taking a leading role in community events.

There are now ten Scout Districts in the Region:

- Arbroath
- North Angus
- South Angus.

These three were formerly in the old Area of Angus as: Arbroath & Montrose District, North Angus and South Angus District.

- Dundee
- Dunfermline
- Glenrothes and Levenmouth
- Kirkcaldy
- Rosyth
- North East Fife. The former Area of Fife contained ten Districts: Benarty District, Cupar District, Dunfermline District, East Neuk District, Glenrothes and Levenmouth District Kirkcaldy, Rosyth District and St Andrews District
- Perth and Kinross. There are 25 Groups and 5 Explorer units.

=== South East Scotland Region ===
The South East Scotland Region was formed by amalgamating the four previous Scout Areas of Borders, East Lothian, Midlothian, and City of Edinburgh.

There are now seven Scout Districts in the Region:

- Braid – merging Blackford and Morningside (from April 2012)
- Borders. The old Area was 4 Districts: Berwickshire District, Ettrick and Lauderdale District, Roxburgh District, Tweeddale District.
- East Lothian. The old Area was 2 Districts: North — East Lothian District and South — East Lothian District
- Craigalmond – merging Haymarket and Inverleith (from April 2012) Craigalmond Scouts
- Edinburgh North East – merging Leith District and Portobello District
- Midlothian
- Pentland

The Edinburgh Scout Area was formerly 8 Districts: Blackford, Haymarket, Inverleith, Leith, Merchiston (Merger Gorgie and Craiglockhart Districts), Morningside, Pentlands and Almond Valley and Portobello.

When the Edinburgh Scout Area was changed to South East Region the area contained 10 Districts: Borders, East Lothian, Midlothian, Pentland, Haymarket, Blackford, Morningside, Leith and Portobello. The changes made in April 2012 reflect the current Scouting Area.

=== Forth Region ===
The Forth Region was formed by amalgamating the three previous Scout Areas of Clackmannan, Forth Valley, and West Lothian.

There are now four Scout Districts in the Region:

- Clackmannanshire. The previous Area was split into Alloa and Hillfoots Districts.
- Falkirk, previously in the Forth Valley Scout Area.
- Stirling & Trossachs, previously in the Forth Valley Scout Area.
- West Lothian.

=== Clyde Region ===
Map of Scotland highlighting the location of Greater Glasgow

The Clyde Region was formed by amalgamating the two previous Scout Areas of Greater Glasgow and Lanarkshire. Greater Glasgow was a Scout Area that included the local government authorities of the City of Glasgow and East Dunbartonshire, along with parts of North Lanarkshire, South Lanarkshire and East Renfrewshire. Lanarkshire was a Scout Area covering Lanarkshire.

The 28th Glasgow Scout Group's Hut was used to hold the Nazi Party Deputy Leader, Rudolf Hess, after his plane crashed in nearby Eaglesham. This Group is particularly active in international events, helping to organise the Ukrainian Scottish Experience, which helps Ukrainian children to visit Scotland and participate in Scouting during the summer.

The 77th Glasgow (Disabled) Scout Group is the only group in Scotland that caters for young people with physical disabilities. It has four sections: Cubs, Scouts, Explorer Scouts and Scout Network.

The 24th Glasgow Scout Group, is one of the largest Groups with four Beaver Scout Colonies, four Cub Scout Packs, two Scout Troops and an Explorer Scout Unit.

There are eight Scout Districts in the Region:

- Eastwood
- Great Western (amalgamation of Bearsden and Milngavie, North Western and Northern Districts)
- Kelvin Valley (amalgamation of Strathkelvin, North Eastern Glasgow, and Cumbernauld and Kilsyth Districts)
- South East (formerly Cambusglen and Easthill Districts)
- South Western (amalgamation of South Parks and Burrell Districts)
- Strathcalder (amalgamation of East Kilbride and Hamilton Districts)
- Clydesdale
- Calder (amalgamation of Monklands and Motherwell Districts)

=== West Scotland Region ===
The West Scotland Region was formed by amalgamating the three previous Scout Areas of Argyll, Dunbartonshire, Renfrew and Inverclyde.

There are now five Scout Districts in the Region.

- Argyll previously split into Cowal, Kintyre, Mid Argyll, North Argyll Districts
- Dunbartonshire previously split into Clydebank / Kilpatrick, Lennox, Helensburgh Districts
- Renfrewshire
- Greenock and District
- Paisley District

The oldest Scout group in Greenock and District is 5th Greenock and District "Westburn's Own". It started in 1908 and the first Scoutmaster was Sergeant D. Ferguson. Former group members include Sir Albert McQuarrie, Sam Galbraith and three Silver Wolf recipients, Colin Finnie, Jimmy McElwee, and Duncan Riddell. The group won the World Pipe Band Championship in 1922.

=== South West Scotland Region ===
The South West Scotland Region was formed by amalgamating the three previous Scout Areas of Ayrshire, Dumfriesshire and Galloway. The region covers the four Local Authorities of North Ayrshire, East Ayrshire, South Ayrshire, and Dumfries & Galloway.

There are now five Scout Districts in the Region.

- Ayrshire East District was formed in 2006 from Kilmarnock & Loudoun and Kylesmuir Districts.
- Dumfriesshire District was formed from the amalgamation of the old Nithsdale and Annandale & Eskdale districts in 2008.
- Galloway District was formed from the Galloway Area in 2008.
- Kyle and Carrick District was formed in 2006 from Kyle District and Carrick Scout District.
- North Ayrshire and Arran District was formed in 2006 from Cunninghame North, Cunninghame South and Isle of Arran Districts.

== Camp sites ==
The Scout Association in Scotland is responsible for three activity centres:

- Fordell Firs Activity Centre in Fife, just outside Dunfermline where the Scottish Headquarters is situated.
- Meggernie Activity Centre at Bridge of Balgie, in Glen Lyon, Perthshire.
- Lochgoilhead Activity Centre in Argyll.

Templars' Park Scout Campsite in the North East Scotland Region, is located on the south bank of the River Dee about 8 miles west of the city of Aberdeen, and is maintained by the City of Aberdeen Scout Council. The site has capacity for around 2,000 campers, as well as indoor accommodation. A number of Scouting activities are provided on site, including archery and pioneering, and there are also local facilities providing other adventurous activities. Templars' Park, formerly the home-park of Maryculter House, within the Kincardineshire parish of Maryculter, was purchased by the City of Aberdeen Boy Scouts' Association in December, 1935. The following year, it was opened by Baden-Powell.

Auchengillan Outdoor Centre is an outdoor adventure centre and campsite operated by Clyde Region. It is located on the A 809, outside of Blanefield, north of Glasgow. It is accessible from the West Highland Way.

The East Scotland Region, formerly Perth and Kinross Area, jointly with Girlguiding Perth and Kinross, runs Craggan campsite, located between the Braco – Comrie road (B827) and the Muthill – Crieff road (A822).

In the South West Scotland Region there are:

- Craigshiels Outdoor Centre (currently closed)
- Culzean Camp Site, previously the Ayrshire Area Camp Site, is located 12 miles south west of Ayr within the Culzean Country Park, owned by the National Trust for Scotland.
- Gatehouse of Fleet Scout Hall
- Shorefield Camp Site
- Boreland Camp Site, St Anns (near Beattock).

Shorefield is the main campsite for Galloway Area Scouts.

The South-East district main campsite is Bonaly Campsite. It is situated in Edinburgh.

In the West Region, the Regional Scout Council owns Lapwing Lodge, a former hospital, to provide indoor accommodation and full camping facilities.

== Gang Shows ==
Gang Shows have been produced regularly in Scotland.

- Glasgow Gang Show, started in 1936. (Ended in 2013)
- Greenock Gang Show, started in 1942.
- Aberdeen Gang Show, started in 1960.
- Edinburgh Gang Show, started in 1960.
- Dundee Gang Show, started in 1967.
- Inverness Area Gang Show, started in 1983. (Ended in 2016)
- Stirling Gang Show, started in 1986.
- South Western District Gang Show, started in 2017.

== Events ==
In 2008, the National Scout and Guide Symphony Orchestra performed at the Edinburgh Festival playing 'The Great Adventure', a symphony commissioned for the Scouting 2007 Centenary.

Blair Atholl International Jamborette

Blair Atholl Patrol Jamborette is Scottish Scouting's premier international event and has been held, with the kind support of the Dukes of Atholl and Atholl Estates, every two years since 1946. The camp brings together approx 1000 young people and 700 adults with representatives of more than 50 countries for a 10-day camp.

== See also ==
- Girl-guiding Scotland
