= Scouting in North West England =

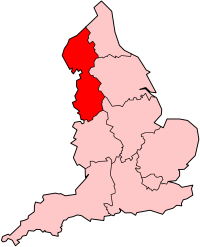

Scouting in North West England is about Scouting in the official region of North West England. It is largely represented by the Scout Association of the United Kingdom and some Groups of traditional Scouting including the British Boy Scouts and British Girl Scouts Association, Baden-Powell Scouts' Association and the Federation of European Scouts (British Association).

The Scout Association in North West England is administered through 8 Scout Counties.

The current Regional Lead Volunteer is Brendan Booth. Nationally, the England Chief Volunteer is Liz Henderson and the UK Chief Volunteer is Carl Hankinson.

The British Boy Scouts and British Girl Scouts Association is administrated via its national headquarters in Dorset (United Kingdom). Administration is carried out by volunteer leaders, and the association has no paid staff, resulting in no membership fees for youth members of the association.

There are many SSAGO (Student Scout and Guide Organisation) clubs situated in the North West. These include:

University of Central Lancashire SSAGO, Lancaster SSAGO, covering Lancaster University and University of Cumbria (formally St Martin's College); Liverpool Universities' Student Scout and Guide Organisation (LUSSAGO), covering University of Liverpool, Liverpool John Moores University (LJMU), Liverpool Hope University and Liverpool Institute for Performing Arts (LIPA); and Manchester SSAGO, covering the University of Manchester, Manchester Metropolitan University and University of Bolton and University of Salford; all affiliated to the Student Scout and Guide Organisation (SSAGO), are situated in North West England.

== History ==
Several Groups in the region were founded in 1908. These include the 1st Marple Group.

== The Scout Association Counties ==
=== Cumbria Scout County ===
Cumbria is a Scout County concurrent with the political county of Cumbria, and provides Scouting opportunities for young people and adults in the area around the English Lake District, including the town of Barrow-in-Furness, and the city of Carlisle.

The county is currently divided into six Scout Districts:

- Eden District

Eden covers Keswick, Penrith, Appleby, the Eden Valley and the North Lakes area

- Kentdale District

Kentdale covers Kendal, Kirkby Lonsdale and the South Lakes area

- North Fells (formerly Solway/Derwent and Workington Districts)

North Fells covers Workington, Maryport, Cockermouth and the Solway Coast

- Reivers District

Reivers District covers Carlisle, the border with Scotland and the surrounding villages

- South West Lakes (Formally Barrow in Furness District and Duddon and High Furness District)

South West Lakes covers Barrow, Ulverston and the south west of Cumbria.

- Western Lakes District

This district covers Whitehaven, Millom and the Western Lake District.

The current County Commissioner is Eddie Ward.

==== Events ====
The Rawnsley Shield is an annual competition for Scouts in the Reivers District in Cumbria Scout County. Starting in the 1920s its roots go back to Canon Hardwicke Rawnsley who donated the shield to Scouting. The format of the competition changes every year. Each year the county organises Dragnet, an activity for Explorer Scouts and Scout Network, which is based around a manhunt across the Cumbrian Fells.

=== Cheshire Scout County ===
Cheshire is a Scout County concurrent with the political counties of Cheshire East, Cheshire West & Chester, Warrington and Halton.

The county is currently divided into nine Scout Districts:

- Alderley and Knutsford District
- Chester and District
- Ellesmere Port and Neston District
- Macclesfield And Congleton District
- Mid Cheshire District
- Mersey Weaver District
- South West Cheshire District
- Warrington East District
- Warrington West District

The current County Commissioner is Dave Hopley.

District badges as worn on the uniform of Scouting members.

==== Alderley Scout Band ====
Alderley Scout Band, formed in 1963 with one bugle and drum, is a traditional marching and display band in based in Wilmslow, Cheshire. It is in the Alderley and Knutsford Scout District of the Cheshire Scout County. The band takes part in competitions under the TYMBA Traditional Youth Marching Bands Association (TYMBA) and the British Youth Band Association (BYBA) rules, winning over 500 trophies including many Supreme Champions.

In 1984 and 1994 the band was invited to play at Windsor Castle in front of respectively Her Majesty the Queen and the Duchess of Kent. They have also appeared in the Royal Tournament, on Television, in the London Parade, the Lord's Mayor of Manchester's Parade and toured the Netherlands in 1992 and Belgium in 1995.

By 2000, the band has declined to under 10 members, only 3 of whom were under 25, and they could no longer compete. New members were recruited and from October 2003 it began competing again in competitions within TYMBA, and at local parades and fetes . In 2007, the Centenary year of Scouting, the band joined with the 1st Syston Scout and Guide Band to perform at the National Scout St George's Day Parade at Windsor Castle in front of the Queen. In November 2008 the band were crowned National Champions at the TYMBA National Finals, 10 years since they had last won the top award.

=== East Lancashire Scout County ===
East Lancashire Scout County covers the industrial towns of East Lancashire.

The County contains 6 Scout Districts:

- Blackburn District
- Burnley & Pendle District (formally Burnley District and Pendle District)
- Clitheroe District
- Darwen District
- Hyndburn District
- Rossendale District

The Burnley and Pendle District was formed after the merger of Burnley District and Pendle District in 2013

=== Greater Manchester East Scout County ===
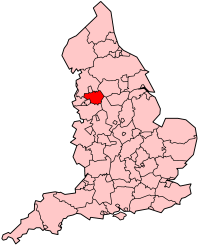
Map of England highlighting the location of Greater Manchester

Greater Manchester East Scout County is one of three Scout Counties based in Greater Manchester. The area is divided into nine Districts, covering the city of Manchester itself, Stockport, Tameside, New Mills and Glossop. Both New Mills and Glossop are situated within the county boundaries of Derbyshire, but has been included in the area due to its close geographical position near the Greater Manchester conurbation.

The County contains nine Scout Districts:

- North Manchester and Medvale
- Manchester South
- Cheadle
- Stockport (Incorporated Goyt District in 2018)
- Ladybrook Valley
- Glossop
- North Tameside
- Tameside South Scout District (Denton & Hyde)
- Tame Valley

=== Greater Manchester North Scout County ===
Greater Manchester North is one of three Scout Counties which cover the metropolitan county of Greater Manchester, and provides a Scouting programme to the towns of Bolton, Bury, Farnworth, Heywood, Middleton, Prestwich and Rochdale, amongst others. The County Headquarters are in Middleton.

The county is currently divided into 6 Scout Districts:

- Bolton Moorland
- Bolton South and Farnworth
- Bury & Ramsbottom
- Oldham Borough
- Pennine (covering Rochdale Metro Borough - Heywood, Middleton & Rochdale)
- Prestwich, Whitefield and Radcliffe

=== Greater Manchester West Scout County ===
Greater Manchester West is one of three Scout Counties which cover the metropolitan county of Greater Manchester, and provides a Scouting programme to the metropolitan boroughs of Salford, Trafford and Wigan.

The current County Commissioner is Jacob Bond.

Within the Scout County there are three Scout Groups listed among the 'first troops' founded in 1908:

- 1st Worsley (originally: 6th Eccles)
- 1st Flixton (L'Avenir)
- 1st Stretford (Longford)

The county is currently divided into seven Districts:

- Altrincham and District
- Lilford District Scouts (formally Atherton & Tyldesley District and Leigh and District)
- Salford District (formally Lowry District and Ellesmere District)
- Sale and District
- Stretford District
- Urmston and District
- Wigan and District

Eccles District and Worsley District merged in the early 2000s to form Ellesmere District.

Atherton and Tyldesley District and Leigh District were merged on 1st October 2009 to form Lilford District.

Salford District and Swinton and Pendlebury District were merged in December 2015 to create the new Lowry District. The new district was named after artist L.S.Lowry who spent most of his life living in Swinton and notably painted industrial landscapes and working-class people of Salford for many years.

Ellesmere District and Lowry District were merged on 1st October 2025 to form Salford District.

=== Merseyside Scout County ===
Merseyside Scout County is a Scout County covering five Metropolitan Boroughs of Knowsley, St. Helens, Sefton, Wirral, and the City of Liverpool.

The county is divided into eleven Scout Districts:

- Altside
- Bebington
- Birkenhead
- Crosby
- Liverpool North
- Liverpool South
- Sefton North
- St Helens
- Wallasey
- West Wirral

On 1 April 2010 Bootle, Sefton East and Kirkby Districts merged to form Altside District, Allerton, Picton and parts of Knowsley Districts merged to form Liverpool South District and Fairfield, Walton on the Hill and parts of Knowsley Districts merged to form Liverpool North District. This followed a review of the County in 2009.

Within Merseyside county, the Crosby district is also the home of the Crosby Scout and Guide Marina Club, who offer dinghy and kayak sailing to local youth, based at the newly rebuilt Crosby Lakeside Adventure Centre opened in October 2009. The club runs a dinghy section, sailing a variety of craft - Wayfarer, GP14s, Enterprise, RS Fevas, Herons, Gulls, Toppers - and a kayak section. It is co-run by the Scout and Guide movements, but not exclusively for Scouts and Guides, and draws its membership from local youth aged 10 to about 20 years.

In 2019, the districts of Formby and Southport were merged to create the new district of Sefton North.

=== West Lancashire Scout County ===
West Lancashire Scout County is a Scout County covering half of Lancashire, the other half being covered by East Lancashire Scout County with the two roughly separated by the M6.

The boundaries of Lancashire were changed in 1974 as part of local government. Shortly after, the Scout Counties in Lancashire changed to reflect these border changes. West Lancashire Scout County was created from parts of the original North West and South West Lancashire Scout Counties. According to their 2006 census the Scout County had 9347 members within 154 Scout Groups.

==== Districts ====
- Blackpool
- Chorley
- Fylde
- Lonsdale
- Ormskirk
- Preston
- South Ribble
- Wyre

The Scout County hosts Be Prepared: The Story of Scouting, the first purpose-built Scout museum in the UK.

==== Headquarters ====
West Lancashire Scouts headquarters are at Waddecar Scout Camp in Goosnargh, Preston.

==== Mountaineering ====
The Scout County regularly runs a varied number of trips including training weekends in Scotland around the Cairngorms and smaller ski trips to the Alps as well as Scotland.

==== Greenland ====
The Scout County is well known for their mountaineering adventure element of their program. Over the last few years two trips to Greenland have resulted in some assents of unclimbed peaks. The first trip, in 2004 featured a link up to Waddecar via a Sat phone during the campsite's birthday celebrations with the Chief Scout, the second during 2007 to Ren Land featured a far larger number of participants and a sea kayak element. The trips were approved by the Young Explorers Trust and the British Mountaineering Council. As well as the mountaineering and adventure side, scientific elements were also completed

==== International ====
Away from mountaineering the county also has run in the past trips to Uganda which aimed to complete a multi-purpose building to be used for health promotions, clinics for immunisation of the local population. The county has participant in International Jamboree, EuroJam and international trips to Austria, Belgium and Canada. They have also attended the Menin Gate memorials during November.

== Campsites ==
=== Ashworth Valley Camp Site ===
Ashworth Valley, which lies between Bury and Rochdale, was purchased in 1944 by Rochdale and Heywood Scout Association Districts. It was previously part of the estate of the Earl of Egerton. The comedian/songwriter Mike Harding included a mention of "Ashy Valley" in his song about a Cub Scout going to camp.

=== Bispham Hall Scout Camp ===
Bispham Hall is a 60-acre (240,000 m^{2}) Activity Centre situated almost midway between Manchester and Liverpool, near to the village of Billinge.

=== Bowley Scout Camp and Activity Centre ===
Bowley Scout Camp and Activity Centre, established in 1968, is managed by the East Lancashire Scout County of the Scout Association. The site, of 47 acres (190,000 m^{2}) of former agricultural pasture, provides both camping sites and indoor accommodation . It has open views to Pendle Hill and the distant peaks within the Lake District National Park and North Yorkshire National Park. Activities on site include climbing walls, archery, rifle shooting, and grass sledges. A new eco-building is being constructed on site, being one of the first commercial/residential centres to be built out of straw bales.

=== Dunham Park Scout Camp ===
Dunham Park is a 15-acre (61,000 m^{2}) mixed woodland camp site located at Dunham Massey, near the town of Altrincham, some 8 miles (13 km) south of the centre of Manchester.

=== Tatton Park Campsite ===
Located in the secure parkland of a National Trust property, it is ideal for water-based activities as it has access via a private jetty to Tatton Mere. The campsite has several large grassed camping areas bordering an open activity field with access to water points and three smaller woodland sites. Wood burning is permitted using the altar fires provided and in the campfire circle, which has rustic seating provided.

There is no "overnight" indoor accommodation, but there is one building, which is equipped with stainless steel commercial kitchen appliances and facilities, crockery and cutlery for 50 people is provided. The activity room can seat up to approximately 50 people for meals. Toilets and showers serve visitors.

=== Forest Camp Activity Centre ===
This large wooded camp can accommodate over 1000 in a range of sites from large open fields to small clearings. The toilet blocks have hot water and showers, and are equipped with special needs facilities.

There are two buildings that can be hired, each sleeps 24 residents in a combination of room sizes. The 'George Begg' building has central heating and a stainless steel kitchen with commercial appliances, large fridge and freezer. The 'Lakeview' building has heating throughout, the kitchen has a selection of appliances and is better suited to more reserved catering demands. Both kitchens have crockery and cutlery provided for 50 people.

=== Barnswood Campsite ===
Barnswood Scout Camp site is set in the Staffordshire Moorlands, just outside of Cheshire and is the District Scout camp site for Macclesfield & Congleton. Barnswood is open to all Scouting, Guiding and Youth groups for camps of all sizes. Barnswood Scout Camp Site is 63 acres in size and consists of mixed woodland with 22 open grassed camping sites and a selection of buildings.

=== Milldale Scout Camp ===
Milldale is South West Cheshire District Scouts own campsite. Set in 28 acres of secluded countryside near Crewe it is open to all members of the Scouting and Guiding fraternity. A stream, 5 acres of mature woodland and a 7-acre camping field make Milldale a location for traditional troop and patrol camping activities. A toilet block and large barn provide additional facilities.

=== Queens Charlotte's Wood ===
Consisting of nine acres of undulating woodland it has sheltered grass sites that are suitable for Group or Patrol camping. Being positioned between the Frodsham and Helsby Hills at the end of the sandstone ridge that runs NW to NE across the Cheshire plain, it is a base site for those wishing to walk the Sandstone Trail or the Delamere Forest.

=== Ennerdale Scout Centre ===
Ennerdale Scout Centre is owned and maintained by the Cumbria Scout Association County, and is located on the River Ehen near to Ennerdale Water. The site only covers around 6 acres (24,000 m^{2}), but offers a range of camping pitches, as well as some indoor accommodation for up to around 60 people. This site was previously owned by the former West Cumberland Scout County. For over 50 years, the Oxford University Scout and Guide Group has had a close association with the camp site, with students camping for a week before and after the summer camping season in the University Easter vacation and the university Summer vacation in September.

=== Great Tower Activity Centre ===
Great Tower Activity Centre is located on the eastern shore of Windermere in the Lake District National Park. While it is located in the Cumbria Scout Association County, as from 1 April 2011, Great Tower Scout Activity Centre joined the National Activity Centres programme and is owned and managed by The Scout Association. The site covers an area of 250 acres (1.0 km^{2}).

=== Greater Manchester North Scout Association Camp sites ===
Dog Hill Scout and Community Camp Site in Shaw, Oldham and Bibby's Farm Scout Camp and Activity Centre near Chorley but administered by the Scout districts in Bolton are available to Scouts, Guides and other youth organisations in Greater Manchester North Scout County or elsewhere. There is also Giants Seat camp site run by Radcliffe District.

=== Linnet Clough Scout Camp ===
Linnet Clough Scout Camp is situated in Greater Manchester near the towns of Marple and Stockport. Developed from a working dairy farm, Linnet Clough is an all year round Scout activity centre and camp site with facilities for a multitude of outdoor activities.

There are 17 1/4 acres of camping fields surrounded on three sides by woods and plantations of trees to provide shelter and windbreaks on the fields. There are three main fields. There is normally a field warden resident in the camping area. There is a large "Storm Hut" which can be used in adverse weather conditions.

=== Middlewood Scout Camp ===
Closed 18-12-2016 to make room for RHS Salford Garden. A new site has been provided about 1/4-mile south east of Middlewood. This site is named Hollinwood and will open circa May 2017. Middlewood Scout Camp is situated near the town of Worsley, near the Bridgewater Canal.

Middlewood has a large number of varied size camping pitches, ranging from large sites suitable for district or group events down to small sites suited to patrol camping. The campsite features a modern toilet block with a hot water supply and showers.

Two buildings, Cunliffe Lodge and the Cub Hut are also available. Cunliffe Lodge, the larger building, features a fully equipped kitchen, a main activities/dining hall, three bunkrooms (sleeping 15, 6 and 4), male and female bathrooms and central heating. The Cub Hut features a small kitchen and dining room, a lounge with tables and chairs, two bunkrooms sleeping six and four and a leaders room.

One of Middlewood's main features is the large boating lake, co-leased with Broughton Angling Club. Scouts can use the lake for canoeing, kayaking, rafting and fishing. The site also has a rifle range and a large selection of pioneering poles. The Camp Team run open campfires with songs and campfire stunts on Saturday evenings during camping season.

=== Hollinwood Scout Camp ===
Hollinwood Scout Camp is a 30 acre scout camp founded in 2017 due to the closure of middlewood scout camp, its located near the town of Worsley, near the Bridgewater Canal. A project was launched called Build Hollinwood to help improve and build the campsite further.

its listed facilities are Hot showers, several toilets, Wi-Fi (upon request), parking capacity for upto 60 cars, Hammocks for hire and easy access to the Brigewater canal.

=== Moor Crag Water Activity Centre ===
Moor Crag Activity Centre is based on the eastern shore of Windermere, near to Great Tower Activity Centre. It provides a base for a wide variety of waterborne activities. Accommodation is available in a residential block at the centre, the Waterside Wood Chalet. Alternatively camping is generally arranged at Great Tower.

The activity centre has 68 m of water frontage along the shore of Windermere, which includes 2 jetties and a boat house / wet dock, which is used to house the control room and safety craft. Canoes, Kayaks and Sailing boats are owned by the centre, and are available for hire.

=== Ratlingate International Camping Centre ===
Ratlingate International Camping Centre is located 4 miles (6.4 km) south of the city of Carlisle, and is owned and maintained by Reivers Scout Association District. The site consists of 4 acres (16,000 m^{2}) of camping field, with a further 20 acres (81,000 m^{2}) in mixed woodland pitches. It originally had a wooden hut, which burnt down and so was replaced with a building at the top of the campsite which has kitchens, toilets and dormitories. Nearly all Reivers camps take place at Ratlingate, including the recent Centenary Camp where over 250 people attended. Its woods can hold many activities from backwoods cooking to pioneering, and is regularly used for orienteering competitions.

=== Tawd Vale Adventure Centre ===
Tawd Vale Adventure Centre is a campsite of the Merseyside Scout County. Named after the River Tawd, which flows through the camp, it consists of 80 acres (320,000 m^{2}) in West Lancashire. The site is currently run by the county's Assistant County Commissioner (Tawd Vale), along with the assistance of a number of volunteers. The site continues to undergo improvements, including recent toilet and shower block refurbishments.

Tawd Vale has indoor accommodation consisting of two ten-person bothys, a commercial kitchen/activity space and 12-person semi-sheltered sleeping area.

The Delph, which is a flooded ex-quarry is now Tawd Vales' private facility for water sports activities such as canoeing and rafting. With flat grassy sites, and dense ancient woodland, activities available at Tawd Vale include; Climbing, Abseiling, Bouldering, Crate Stacking, High Ropes, Rifle Shooting, Archery, Tomahawk Throwing, kayaking, Canoeing, Rafting, Pioneering.

=== Waddecar Scout Activity Centre ===
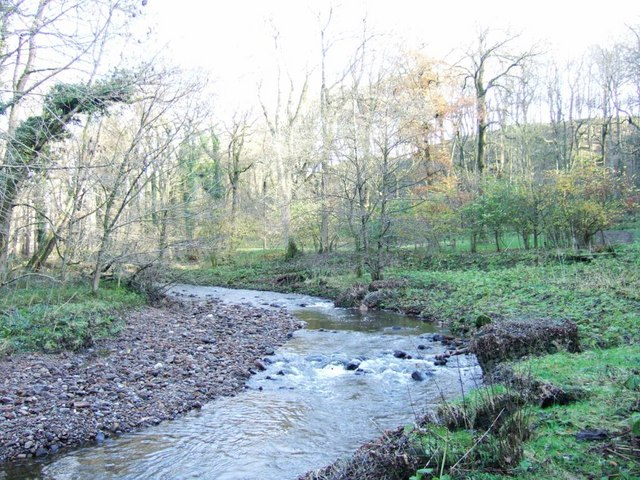
The River Brock, just to the north of Waddecar

Waddecar Scout Activity Centre (formerly Waddecar Scout Camp) is located in the Forest of Bowland, Lancashire. The site has a large number of woodland pitches, as well as fields, allowing almost one thousand Scouts to camp communally. There are also a number of buildings offering indoor accommodation.

Waddecar has several buildings that can be hired out by Scout groups and other youth organisations. These include Helme Lodge and Jubilee Base. It also has several large areas for pitching tents, including the Training Field and Bill's Meadow. The site also offers a number of activities, including abseiling, climbing, an obstacle course, archery, cycle hire, and an air rifle shooting range.

The site has a Scouting Museum in a building designed by Roy Fisher.

=== West Lancashire district campsites ===
As well as the larger County activity centres listed above, smaller centres are owned and run by Scout Districts:

- Mowbreck Campsite is run by Blackpool District.
- Fylde District has an Activity Barn at its District HQ.
- Lonsdale District has two activity centres: the T.W. Helme Memorial Activity Centre at Littledale, and the SilverHelme Activity Centre in Silverdale.

== Gang Shows ==
=== Chorley Capers Scouts and Guides Gang Show ===
The Chorley Capers is a Gang Show held at St Michael's High School in Chorley, West Lancashire. Scouts, Guides and leaders from both organisations perform on stage in musical-style fashion. In 2019, Chorley Capers was recorded for the first time in 5 years and by a Young Person in a Youth Media Team for the first time in any gang show. The show operates yearly and usually performs in spring time.

=== Chester Gang Show ===
Chester Gang Show started in 1954.

=== Blackpool Gang Show ===
The Blackpool Gang Show was first staged in 1961. It has appeared at the Opera House, Grand Theatre & Pavilion Theatre, then from 2005, the Globe Theatre. It was visited by the Gang Show founder Ralph Reader at the Opera House. It has a cast of over 100 members from all sections of the Scout Association and Girlguiding UK along with leaders from both Associations.

=== Crewe Gang Show ===
The Crewe Gang Show originated in 1938, although the South West Cheshire Scout District had been running an evening of entertainment for attendees of their Annual General Meeting for many years beforehand. In 1949, it was performed at the New Theatre, Crewe. This venue has continued to 2008, which will mark the 70th Anniversary. The Gang Show was awarded the privilege of using the coveted Red Necker in 1964. Ralph Reader, the man behind the original Gang Show held in 1931, visited the Crewe Gang Show in 1980, and wrote in a letter, "With no hesitation, I say again, it was one of the finest Gang Shows I have ever seen". The 2006 show included 23 Cub Scouts and 62 Scouts and Leaders as the cast, and many others as production crew.

=== Warrington Gang Show ===
The Warrington Gang Show started in 1951. In 2008, it celebrated its 50th production along with the centenary of Scouting. Up until 1992 Warrington Gang Show was performed at Crosfields Centenary Theatre in Warrington, but moved to Warrington's Parr Hall in 1991 when Crosfields was closed and demolished. This venue has been Warrington Gang Show's home since.

=== Other Gang Shows ===
==== Birkenhead Gang Show ====
Birkenhead Gang Show was started in 1961.

They brought the show to London for its 50th anniversary.

==== Barrow ====
The Barrow Gang Show is a relatively new Gang Show, starting in 1995.

==== Congleton ====
Congleton Gang Show started in 1972 and runs every two years.

==== Knutsford ====
Knutsford Gang Show started in 1986.

==== Marple ====
1st Marple Scout Group, with Marple Guides, are involved in the Marple Gang Show in the Carver Theatre. This show has been running continuously for over 40 years, and is nationally recognised via the Red Knecker scheme.

==== Sale ====
The Sale Gang Show perform every year at Altrincham Garrick Playhouse since 1963. In recent years, the Gang Show has returned to playing in the Waterside in Sale, its location before moving to the Garrick.

==== Mid Cheshire Gang Show ====
The Mid Cheshire Gang Show, covering the towns of Northwich, Winsford and Middlewich in Cheshire is one of the newest Gang shows, starting in 2007. In March 2011, after the third bi-annual production, it was awarded the coveted Red Knecker.

==== St. Helens ====
St. Helens Gang Show held its first show at the Theatre Royal, St. Helens in 1964, celebrated its 50th anniversary in 2014 and continues in the same location. It now has over 100 members of the Scout and Guide movement in the cast.

==== West Wirral ====
West Wirral Gang Show started in 1990.

== See also ==
- Scouting sections
- Scouting staff
- Girlguiding North West England
