= Tolmers Park =

Country house in Hatfield, Hertfordshire, England

Coordinates: 51.7261°N 0.1175°W

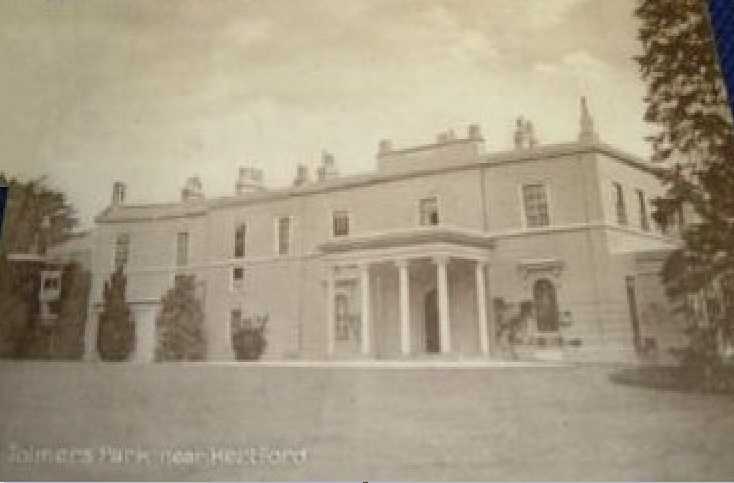
Tolmers Park, from an old postcard

Tolmers Park is a manor house in Newgate Street Village near Hatfield in Hertfordshire, England.

== Early history ==
The early history of the manor is obscure, but in a register of lands belonging to the Bishop of Ely compiled in 1277, a certain Walter de Tolymer was tenant-in-chief of lands close to Hatfield Great Park. It is likely that he is the origin of the Tolmers name. A famous lord of the manor was Robert Dudley, 1st Earl of Leicester who held Tolmers from 1566 until his death without heirs in 1588, when his land reverted to the Crown. Legend has it that the young Lady Arbella Stuart was detained there in the custody of the Earl. In 1608, Tolmers was granted to Sir Henry Goodere, a colourful character who was always short of money and given to writing poems to prominent figures in the Royal Household in the hope of advancement. In a petition of 1626 applying for a position at Court, he wrote that he "desired only meat, drink and lodging, with some dignity, in that place where I have spent most of my time and estate." He died in the following year.

== 18th and 19th centuries ==
In 1761, Tolmers Park was in the hands of Sir Frances Vincent, who replaced the Tudor house with the present building in the classical style with an Ionian porch. The Northaw Inclosure Act 1803 (43 Geo. 3. c. 11 Pr.) allowed part of Northaw Common to be enclosed and planted with specimen trees to form Home Wood. The whole estate was sold at auction in 1834. It was bought by Samuel Mills, of Russell Square, a textile and property magnate, who already owned adjoining land in Cuffley. The estate then passed to his son, Thomas Mills, who was MP for Totnes and then to his other son, John Remington Mills, also an MP (for Wycombe). In 1860, Tolmers was leased to Thomas Bazley, a Manchester cotton mill owner who had been a Royal Commissioner for the Great Exhibition and was MP for Manchester. He became 1st Baronet Bazley of Tolmers in 1869 (motto: Finem Respice). The ownership of the estate eventually passed to Samuel Mills’ two great-granddaughters, one of whom was the novelist Mary Cholmondeley. From 1910 to 1918 the eastern edge of the estate was busy with excavations for the Hertford Loop railway line, one of the last great projects of the railway age.

== 20th century ==
In World War I the house was used as a military hospital and between the wars was a girls’ boarding school, which had its own Girl Guide Company (1st Tolmers). On an Ordnance Survey map dated 1921, part of Tolmers is shown as a golf course. In 1939, 50 acres (200,000 m^{2}) of the estate south of Cuffley Brook was sold to the Boy Scouts Association for use as a campsite. Tolmers Scout Camp was opened on 11 May 1940 by Lord Wigram. On the outbreak of World War II, Tolmers Girls School was evacuated, eventually to settle at Beechwood Park near St Albans. The house again became a military hospital, but later in the war the hospital was used for geriatric patients and it continued in this role until the 1980s. When the Health Service finally vacated Tolmers Park, the house (a Grade II Listed Building) was refurbished. The estate remains as altered by Ray Franklin, the developer, converted into 16 luxury houses.
