= List of the oldest Scout groups =

The oldest Scout groups
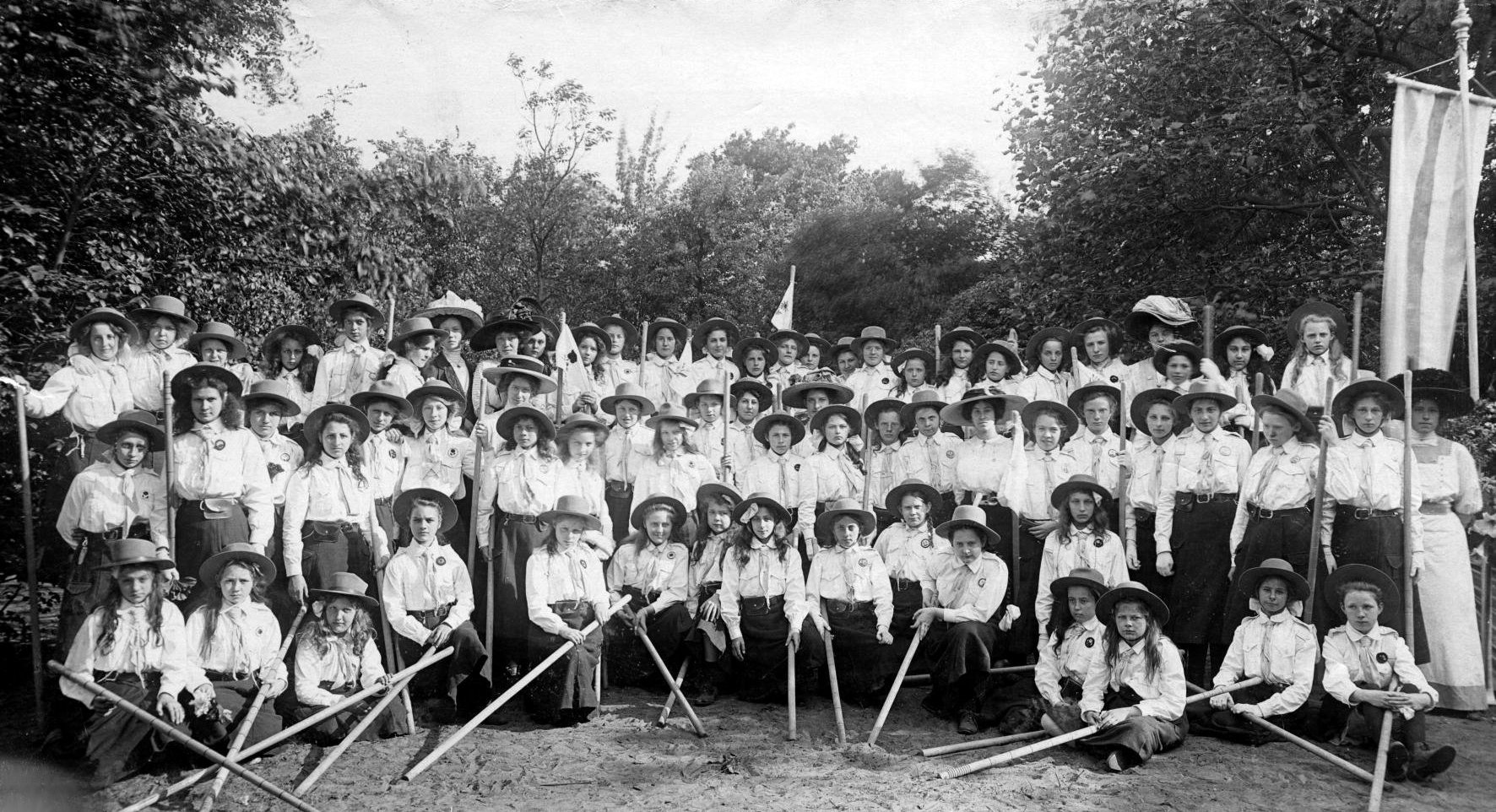
- 1911 – First Dutch Girls Companions Society first Dutch Girl Guides (Dutch: Eerste Nederlandsche Meisjes Gezellen Vereeniging)

Various Scout Groups claim the title of oldest Scout group in their respective countries. As Scouting is a movement and not an organisation and developed rather than was constituted, there was initially no central organisation and there is no clear starting date. Due to the rapid growth of Scouting, there were many Scout groups before central organisations were established and therefore the earliest groups were only registered long after they had been formed. Some groups first met under the banner of other organisations, including the Boys' Brigade, Church Lads' Brigade, YMCA, churches or schools, and only later registered with central Scout organisations. Some maintained dual registrations. This makes it impossible to establish which groups started first. Today, national Scout associations often do not take a stance as to which was the first group in their country.

== Development of Scouting ==
Scouting developed in the early years of the twentieth century. There are records of Boy Scouts and Scouting groups from 1900. The Boys' Brigade began its Scouting scheme in 1906. Robert Baden-Powell held a demonstration camp on Brownsea Island from 1 August 1907. Thereafter, the publisher C. Arthur Pearson Limited began promoting Scouting in Britain and published Baden-Powell's Scouting for Boys, initially in six fortnightly instalments from January 1908 and then in complete book form which C. Arthur Pearson Limited followed with The Scout magazine from April 1908. Boys began forming Scout patrols and flooding C. Arthur Pearson Limited's Scout office and Baden-Powell with requests for assistance.

The Scouting movement developed rapidly, in Britain, the British Empire, among English-speaking people and the rest of the world.

== United Kingdom ==
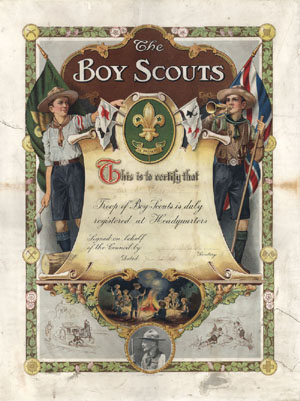
Registration Certificate for the First Glasgow Scout Group, one of the claimants to the title of First Troop

There are a number of claimants to be the first troop in the United Kingdom. As Scouting is a movement and not an organisation, there was initially no central organisation. The publishers C. Arthur Pearson Limited sold registration cards to subscribers of its magazine. Numerous local or regional Boy Scouts associations were formed and several national Scouting organisations were formed in the United Kingdom including the Boys' Brigade Scouts, Chums Scout Patrols, YMCA Boy Scouts, British Boy Scouts, Church Scout Patrols, London Diocesan Boy Scout Corps, Boys' Life Brigade Scouts, National Peace Scouts, The Boy Scouts Association and Salvation Army Boy Scouts (re-organized in 1914 as the Life-Saving Scouts of the Salvation Army). The Boy Scouts Association (now The Scout Association) was formed in 1910 and does not acknowledge any single troop as being the first but maintains a list of all the Scout Troops who claim to have started in 1908.

The Scout Troops with strong claims are listed below:

The First Glasgow Scout Group in Scotland holds the earliest known registration certificate, dated 26 January 1908, issued by The Boy Scouts Association. The Group was formed from the Glasgow Battalion of the Army Cadet Corps; its Adjutant was Captain Robert E Young. In June 1907, they formed the 'Cadets' Winter Recreation Training Club'. The club was a success from the beginning, as 'Boss' Young related: "At first we met at my house, signalled up and down the stairs, tied knots around the banisters and always finished with a good tuck-in." 'Boss' Young met B–P during Autumn 1907 who suggested that the club could experiment with the ideas contained in 'Scouting for Boys'. On 16 January 1908, the club was formally disbanded and the First Glasgow Troop of Boy Scouts was registered with Scout HQ in London.

The 1st Chesham Bois Group was founded in 1908.

The 1st City of London holds a copy of their formal registration dated 24 May 1908 (Empire Day), but they had been operating for a few months prior to this date. The Scout Master was Arthur Poyser, the verger at All Hallows by The Tower – an associate of Lord Baden-Powell – see the group history at www.cityoflondonscouts.org.uk – the Group has operated continuously since formation, and is the only uniformed youth organisation in the City of London. They became the Lord Mayor's Own Scout Group in 1911.

The first Scout Troop to receive a visit from Baden-Powell was the Vaux's Own Scout Troop in Sunderland. This visit was made on 22 February 1908, so it is assumed by The Scout Association "that it had already been in existence for some days at any rate". This was also the first Scout Troop listed in the Imperial records. The 1st Crystal Palace Patrol (now known as the 2nd Croydon, 1st Crystal Palace) is documented as being in existence on 28 February 1908. The group is still in existence.

In 2007, 1st Henfield Scout Troop was named as the oldest surviving Scout Troop in the world for the centenary of Scouting. They were the hosts of the only place that the centenary flame stopped in England for the night before reaching its goal of Brownsea Island. However, it is not the oldest Scout Troop, as others were set up before Henfield. It is said that the boys that went to Brownsea Island on the first ever Scout trip were from Henfield.

The 1st Birkenhead (YMCA) has a claim to be the oldest Scout Troop as it was founded on 24 January 1908 when B P attended a meeting at the YMCA. Documents at the District Headquarters confirm this fact. Baden-Powell at the 1929 Coming of Age Jamboree in Birkenhead said "Here in Birkenhead that I first mooted the idea of Scouting".

1st Connahs Quay Scout Group were founded in April 1908. They are believed to be the oldest Scout Group in Wales.

The 1st Croydon Scout Group (Addiscombe) were founded in the latter months of 1907. The Group was officially registered by Imperial Scout Headquarters on 16 June 1908 and can claim to be one of the earliest Groups.

1st Church Kirk, Church near Accrington Lancashire. Formed 1907. Baden Powell formed a link with Accrington during his opening of the Ambulance Drill Hall in 1904.

1st Cheltenham (Highbury) started in early 1908, they were visited by Baden-Powell on 13 January 1908 and by March 1908 the Troop was meeting regularly.

The 1st New Cross (The Greys) Scout Group was formed 17 January 1908 but was not registered until 26 May 1908 by Baden Powell before he even registered his own group.

There is an entry in Baden-Powell's diary on 4 February 1908 which mentions a Scout Troop in Nottingham.

1st Alsager, Cheshire were formed before 24 February 1908.

A troop from Hampstead was involved in various events in the first half of 1908.

5th Islington, London was formed in April 1908 by a group of boys who had formed a "secret society" at St Mary Magdalene Sunday School, inspired by the first copy of The Scout magazine.

The 1st City of Aberdeen Scouts existed in 1908. 1st Arbroath Scout Troop (2nd Angus) dates back to June 1908.

1st Stirlingshire Scouts unofficially first met in August 1908, and later officially on 21 December 1908.

The 1st Norwich "Capt. Bower's Own" Sea Scouts started in January 1908. The group is one of few which has continuously run for 100 years and, remarkably, had just 4 Group Scout Leaders during that time. To celebrate their centenary year, the group published a book entitled, "It Can Be Done: The Hundred Year History of the 1st Norwich Sea Scout Group." drawing from their extensive archives.

The 1st Colchester scout group in Essex (now known as 1st Colchester Air Scouts) were founded in May 1908, the group met in the Bunting Rooms in Culver Street West (Colchester) and Baden Powell made several visits to attend local Scouting rallies. The "Air Scout Troop" gained official recognition by the Royal Air Force in 1956 and has retained this recognition.

1st Sawbridgeworth Scouts organisation in Hertfordshire claims to be among the oldest in the country, founded in the earlier months of 1908, also backing their claim is a plain red "scarf" (most groups have two or three colours).

In Poole, Dorset, there are strong claims from three current Scout Groups that all have separate newspaper articles back to 1908 listing Patrols or Troops practicing Scouting. 1st Parkstone has got a registration number back to February 1908 for a Scout Troop. Hamworthy are listed as having a Boat patrol at the Local Church in November 1908 and Broadstone having an Ambulance Scout at the Gathering on Brownsea Island in December 1908.

Wycliffe Scout Group (Gloucestershire) claims to be the oldest continuously active school-based Scout group in the world (active September 2013). It is listed in the Scout Association database with a registration date of 1 February 1909, although the Group celebrated their centenary in 2008, implying that there had been Scouting activity at the school before the Group was registered.

The 5th Fife Scout Group, formerly known as the 2nd Kirkcaldy (KHS) Scouts and 5th Kirkcaldy (KHS) Scout Troop which merged in 1919, has maintained an unbroken presence since 1909 with records dating back until this time. The first registered Scoutmaster was Mr Thomas Collins.

== British Empire ==
=== 1908 ===
==== Australia ====
Scouting appears to have started as early as 1907 in Victoria in an informal way when a boy in Caulfield received from a friend, who had been a member of the experimental camp at Brownsea Island, some pamphlets which had been issued by Baden-Powell. The first Scout Group in Australia may have been founded in Northcote in Melbourne in early 1908, but the Victoria Scout Heritage Centre states that "It is very difficult to name the first Troop to start in Victoria". However, by the end of 1908, there were 11 Scout Troops in Victoria.

In New South Wales, 1st Toongabbie Scout Group in the western suburbs of Sydney was founded in 1908 by a member of the Sydney University Scouts, Errol Galbraith Knox (later Brigadier Sir Errol Knox, MBE), and is still operating. Other Sydney groups founded in 1908 and still operating include 1st Hurstville, 1st Petersham, 1st Leichhardt and 1st Paddington (now 1st Woollahra-Paddington).

1st Mosman 1908 is very likely the first scout group in New South Wales and Australia. It was founded by Charles Hope in early 1908 and the place where they met, The Barn is a heritage listed site. 1st Mosman 1908 continues to be active today and has merged with several other local scout groups such as 4th Mosman and Port Jackson Scout Groups.

==== Canada ====
In the spring of 1908, Canada became the first overseas Dominion with a sanctioned Boy Scout program. The 1st Merrickville Scout Troop, founded in 1908, is the oldest Scout troop in North America. Reference "75 Years of Scouting in Canada". The 1st Port Morien Group claims to be the first Scout Group in North America. The Nova Scotia Council of Scouts Canada recognized the centennial of the Port Morien Group by providing a crest to all Nova Scotian Scouts Canada members.

==== Gibraltar ====
The first recognized overseas unit in a country controlled by the United Kingdom was chartered in Gibraltar with the establishment of the 1st Gibraltar Scout Troop on 27 March 1908. The group is still active and has a membership of around 140. It is expected to open a new troop and pack this coming year. The group celebrated its 100th anniversary with a parade along Main Street and received the Freedom of the City of Gibraltar on 2 October 2008. To commemorate the conferment of the title Marquis of Milford Haven one hundred years ago, the present marquis visited the Group during the celebrations.

==== Malaysia ====
In Malaysia, the Scout movement started two years after it was founded in London. However, it is believed that a trial group had been established in Penang at YMCA in 1908, the same year that Scouting was formed in England.

==== Malta ====
The Malta Boy Scouts Association applied to become a member of the British Movement on 9 November 1908 and was officially recognised, as was the procedure then, exactly a year later. The 1st Sliema Scout Group in Malta was founded in 1909.

==== South Africa ====
The first Scout Group in South Africa was formed on 3 March 1908 at Claremont Public School by George French. It is still running, as 1st Claremont Scout Group. Several other groups were founded in South Africa in 1908. Of these, 1st Belgravia Scout Group is still operational under the name 1st Kengray.

==== India ====
The Scout Movement arrived in India in 1909. A troop was formed in Bangalore by a Captain Baker, a retired naval officer. The troop had boys from St. Joseph's, Baldwin's, St. Andrew's, and Bishop Cotton's. The troop was registered with Boy Scout Headquarters in London in November 1909 and, according to records, was the first Scout troop in Asia.

Sethna's 18th West Bombay Scout Group was established in 1914, after Rustomji Edulji Sethna (1898–1954) came across Baden-Powell's Scouting for Boys. Sethna was enamoured with the book, and formed India's first Scout group for native boys. (Prior to this, there were some Scout groups, but they were primarily for British expatriate youth.) The group today is India's oldest continually running Scout group. Since its first day on 14 August 1914, the troop remains continuously active.

The FIRST DACCA, St. Gregory's Scout Troop. The date on the Approval was 7 May 1914. The Scoutmaster was Mr. Joseph Harnett. The total strength of the Troop was forty boys, as of 27 April 1914. The Britist Official Approval, Dalil lists St. Gregory's as the First Troop in the Dacca or East Bengal area, the Bengal Presidency. The first scouts were David Pogose, Peter Gomes, Alfred Ferguson, Harold Armstead, Cyril Lucas and Osmund D'Silva. The school had Five Patrols and Mr. Francis listed the total number of Scouts as 40, to be going on their first camp in January 1915. Since its first day on 27 April 1914, the troop remains continuously active.

==== Isle of Man ====
The 1st Douglas Scout Group, on the Isle of Man (a Crown Dependency of the UK and not technically part of the UK) was also founded in 1909.

== Mafeking Cadets ==
During the Siege of Mafeking (1899–1900), boys in the town formed the Mafeking Cadet Corps, made famous by Baden-Powell in the opening chapter of Scouting for Boys. However, the cadets were not themselves Scouts.

== Outside the British Empire ==
=== 1908 ===
==== United States ====
There are numerous troops which claim to be first Boy Scout troop in the United States. Although there appear to be several Boy Scout troops that were operating prior to the establishment of the Boy Scouts of America, none of these claims are deemed verifiable by the organization – as far back as 1940 an official, George W. Ehler, searched records and determined "After several years of experience with these inquiries and claims, I came to the conclusion that it was not possible from any accepted record to determine which was the first Troop."

- Troop 90 in Pacific Grove California was founded in 1908 as Troop 1 at the Monterey Presidio. The International Scouting Collectors Association Journal claims that documentary evidence, including a picture of the troop in 1908 are "compelling" evidence that it is "the first Boy Scout troop" in the United States. According to the Santa Cruz Sentinel, U.S. Army Maj. Robert Lee Bullard met Baden-Powell in England. When Bullard was later posted to the Presidio of Monterey in 1908, he and three other soldiers "recruited boys from the Monterey Grammar School, fitted them out with uniforms, a flag, drums and bugles. A photograph taken in 1908 shows Troop 1 in ranks by the side of the Monterey Custom House, wearing uniforms." "Troop 1 operated from 1908 to 1912, drifted gradually to Pacific Grove from 1912 to 1918, and was registered as Troop 1, Pacific Grove, from 1918 until 1924, when the number was changed to Troop 90."
- Paoli Troop 1 started in 1909 and is the longest continually running Troop in the nation.
- A claimant for first Boy Scout Troop in the United States is Burnside, Kentucky in 1908.
- Bala One is another claimant for first Boy Scout Troop in the United States in Bala Cynwyd, Pennsylvania. It was started by Frank H. Sykes in 1908 prior to the founding of the Boy Scouts of America.

=== 1909 ===
==== China ====
In Shanghai, a troop of "Boy Scouts" was formed, as a branch of the then existing (British) "Boys' Brigade" whose members were representative of the cosmopolitan but culturally Western population of the city. The 1st Dragon Troop, run on actual Baden-Powell lines, was also formed in early 1909, in Shanghai. These were mostly British boys. The first native Scout troop was organized by Reverend Yen Chia-lin in Wuchang on 25 February 1912 and the Scouting movement spread rapidly all over the country.

==== Chile ====
Robert Baden-Powell visited Chile and gave a speech that inspired the founding of the first Scout Group, Brigada Central. Some time later on 21 May 1909 the first Scout Camp was held. Nowadays, this Group remains active and is known as GAVIN (Grupo Alcibíades Vicencio del Instituto Nacional).

==== Norway ====
The first recognized troop in Norway is "1. Kristiania (NGSK)", established 15 November 1909. This was a troop in Oslo, connected to an athletic organisation. This troop became a part of "Norske Gutters Speiderkorps", which was established by a national sport organisation. But there were single Scouting patrols earlier than this in some Norwegian cities.

==== United States ====
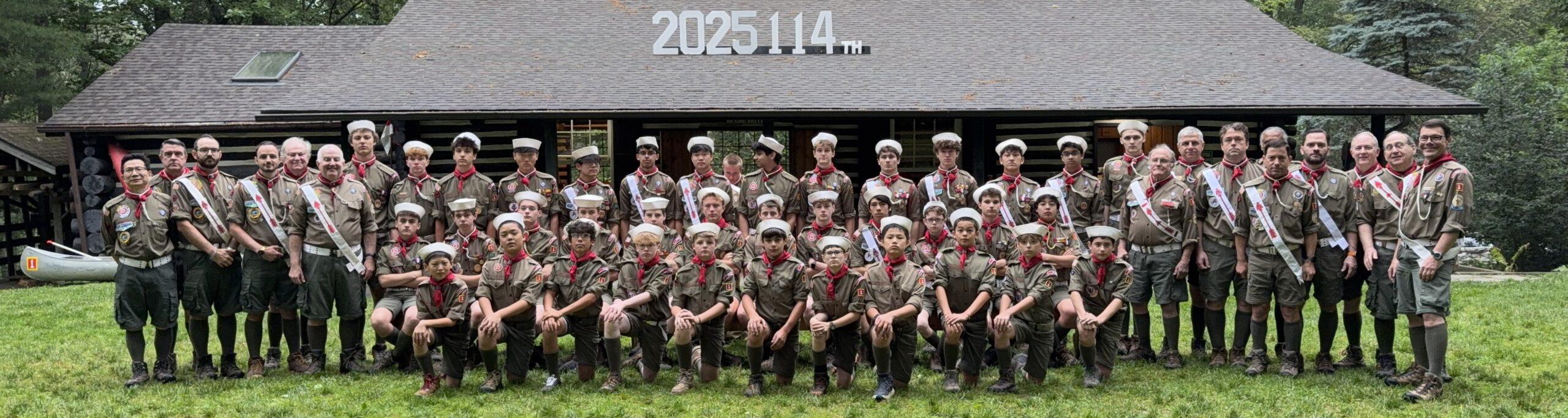
- Paoli Troop 1
  A claimant for first Boy Scout Troop in the United States is in Wayne PA in 1909. Troop Paoli 1 was organized by Rev. Horace Walton in 1909 after he went to England and was fascinated by Lord Baden Powell. When the Boy Scouts of America was incorporated, they were one of the first troops to register. Troop Paoli 1 is the longest continuously running Boy Scout Troop in the country, not pausing during World War II. Paoli 1 is recognized by their odd uniforms. They wear the old military surplus wool uniforms. Paoli Troop 1 is currently based out of Wayne PA.
- Another claimant for first Boy Scout troop is Troop #1 of Barre, Vermont in 1909. It was formed in Barre, Vermont, by William Foster Milne, who moved to the United States from Aberdeen, Scotland.

In 1907, William Foster Milne, a stonecutter, immigrated to Barre, Vermont from Aberdeen, Scotland, where he had been active in the early Scouting movement. He is referred as the "First Scoutmaster in America" by Sir Francis Vane. Sir Francis Vane was London Commissioner of Scouts in Baden Powell's organisation and also became President of the British Boy Scouts. In 1909, "Billy" Milne learned of a small group of boys at the First Baptist Church in Barre, who were already members of the Boys Brigade, he offered them an alternative to their routine of marching and drills. By re-organizing into a new "Boy Scout Club" (Troop #1 in the United States) these Scouts learned first aid, new outdoor skills and being helpful to others. "Billy" Milne went back to his native Scotland and brought back the books and materials he needed along with a British Charter. By 1910, Barre's Troop #1 joined the Boy Scouts of America.
By March 1910, the Boy Scouts in Vermont had expanded to such a degree that the girls of nearby Thetford became interested. These girls along with William Chauncy Langdon, Dr. Luther Gulick and Charlotte Vedder Gulick formed the Camp Fire Girls which became the sister organization of the Boy Scouts of America on 17 March 1910. The Camp Fire Girls preceded the Girl Scouts of the USA by 2 years. (The Boy Scouts of America has always regarded the Camp Fire Girls – not the Girl Scouts – as its sister organization. Up until the 1970s there were suggestions to merge the BSA and the CFG.)
The original group of boys that made up Troop #1 were Charles Booth, George Booth, Gerald Brock, Carl Burgess, Earl Burgess, Stanton Burgess, Raymond Cave, Clarence Geake, James Grearson, Walter Grearson, Douglas Inglis, Harry Kent, George Murray, Milton Rollins, Craig Rollins, Cecil Watt and Wallace Watt. Dr. Wallace Watt moved to Clinton County, Michigan to attend college and remained there as a Scout leader for his entire life. He received the Silver Beaver Award in 1981 and in 1984 a 75 year Diamond Jubilee service pin from the Boy Scouts of America. Upon his death his widow donated his Barre, Vermont Troop 1 artifacts to the Paine-Gillam-Scott Museum in St. Johns, Michigan. Governor Deane C. Davis was an early member of Barre, Vermont's Troop #1.

- A Third claimant for first Boy Scout Troop in the United States is in Pawhuska, Oklahoma in 1909. The Troop was organized in Pawhuska, Osage County, Oklahoma, in May 1909 by Reverend John F. Mitchell. Rev. Mitchell was a missionary priest from England sent to St. Thomas Episcopal Church by the Church of England. Rev. Mitchell, who had been associated in Scout work with Lord Baden-Powell in England, organized the troop of Boy Scouts under English charter and equipped them with English uniforms, manuals, and badges.

=== 1910 ===
By 1910 Argentina, Austria-Hungary, Belgium, Denmark, France, Finland, Germany, Greece, Italy, Mexico, The Netherlands, Norway, Russia, Suriname, Sweden and the United States had Boy Scouts too.

==== Finland ====
Toimen Pojat (Unga Fribyggare in Swedish), a Scouting troop in Kauniainen, Finland was established in 1910. Toimen Pojat is the oldest continuously operating Scout troop in Finland. During the Russian ban on Scouting in the 1910s before the Finnish independence in (1917), the troop operated underground. Many traditions that distinguish the troop formed during that period.

==== Philippines ====
Elwood Stanley Brown, Physical Education Director of the Manila YMCA, founded basketball, volleyball, and Boy Scouting in the Philippine Islands (then a territory of the USA) in 1910. Hence the first Boy Scout unit in the Philippines was the YMCA troop organised by Brown.

In the official Handbook for Boys of the Boy Scouts of America, First Edition, August 1911 (still in print today!), page 354 (page 222 of PDF copy), in a letter from BSA Honorary Vice President Theodore Roosevelt (former US president) to BSA Executive Secretary (later Chief Scout Executive) James E. West, dated 20 July 1911, Roosevelt mentions a letter from a Scoutmaster in the Philippines narrating the noble work of "boy scouts of the Philippines" in rendering assistance during a big fire that hit Manila and in serving at the ten-day Manila Carnival. This is the earliest available documented mention of the phrase "boy scouts of the Philippines" in print. The Manila Scoutmaster's and Roosevelt's letters prove beyond doubt that there were Boy Scouts in the Philippines as early as 1910 – the same year that YMCA International Secretary for Boys' Work Edgar M. Robinson started actively organizing the Boy Scouts of America in the US mainland. Portions of Roosevelt's quote of the Manila Scoutmaster's letter were also printed (before and after the Handbook for Boys edition) in New Castle News (26 May 1911), The Corsicana Daily Sun (31 May 1911), The Washington Post (8 August 1911), The Youngstown Daily Vindicator (23 August 1911), and The Miami Metropolis (20 September 1911). According to The Miami Metropolis article "Boy Scouts Work with the Firemen Just Like Heroes" on page 3, it was "Elwood E. Brown, organizer in the Philippines" who had written to Roosevelt.

During his world tour in 1912, Lord Baden-Powell sent back articles for publication in The Scout. In issue no. 224, 27 July 1912, in the article "In the Cannibal Islands," he made a brief narration about Philippine history and culture and his trip to Manila, illustrated with his own drawings. He mentioned "Boy Scouts of the Philippines" and that he was met by a "Guard of Honour." He also quoted from Roosevelt's letter about the Manila fire and the Manila Carnival in which Scouts rendered valuable service. In the article, Baden-Powell urged readers "to get into correspondence with your brother Scouts in Manila… The Chief Scoutmaster is Mr. Elwood Brown, Y.M.C.A., Manila."

==== United States ====
- In 1909, Dr. Cran, the Local Episcopal Minister, and Mr. C.H. Hamilton organized Troop 19 in Brookhaven, Mississippi through the New Orleans, LA council. In 1910, the unit was officially recognized by the local scout office in Vicksburg. Troop 19 became Troop 119 after the Andrew Jackson Council was formed. It was sponsored by the First Presbyterian Church until 1938/39 when it was then sponsored by "The Men's Bible Class" First United Methodist church where it has remained. The Troop has been continuously chartered since 1910 and is as old as the incorporated Boy Scouts of America.
- On 10 September 1910, S. F. Lester of Troy, New York, became the first person to hold the Scouting leadership position of Scoutmaster (approved by the BSA). He received his certification from the BSA headquarters in New York City. In 1910 he led a group of 30 Scouts at Camp Ilium, in Pownal, Vermont. Camp Ilium was the starting point of the Boy Scout Movement for Troy, and Pownal. Pownal is only 35 miles (56 km) away from Troy.
- In 1910, Dan Beard founded Boy Scouts Troop 1 in Flushing, New York, which is believed to be one of the oldest continuously chartered Boy Scout Troop in the United States.
- Troop 5 of Denver holds claim to be the oldest continually chartered Boy Scout troop in the United States, west of the Mississippi River, having been chartered continuously since 1910.
- In November 1910, Troop #1 of Ridgefield Park, New Jersey received the first charter from the newly organized Boy Scouts of America, with Pastor E. C. Murphy as its first Scoutmaster, with 25 boys registered as charter members and the First Baptist Church as its sponsor. Scout William Orth of Troop #1 received Scout Certificate No. 1 from Washington D.C.
- Troop 1 of Brentwood, Tennessee, also holds claim to be the oldest continually chartered Boy Scout Troop in the United States, having been continuously chartered since 1910. Troop One holds the distinction of only having three Scoutmasters in its over 104-year history.
- Troop 1, Park Ridge, Illinois was formed in 1910 and chartered on 22 June 1912. Charles Morison Dickenson was the first Scoutmaster from 1912 to 1914. Troop 1 has been continuously chartered by First United Methodist Church in Park Ridge since its inception.
- Founded in 1910, Troop 1, Hingham, MA is one of the oldest Boy Scout troops in the U.S. Troop 1 is part of the "Cranberry Harbors District" in the Mayflower Council.

=== 1911 ===
==== Germany ====
The oldest, still existing, Scout Group from Germany was founded in 1911. The Scouts in Backnang, Germany were founded in 1911 by the former city vicar "Schütz" and they are thus among the oldest Protestant scout groups in Germany. The Group belongs to the German VCP, short for Verband Christlicher Pfadfinderinnen und Pfadfinder (Association of Christian Girl Scouts and Boy Scouts). The tribe St. Georg has about 50 active members today. This Year (2022), the tribe celebrates their 111th Birthday. During the Second World War and as the National Socialist Party ruled Germany, all Scout Groups, who did not want to be part of the "Hitler Youth", were forbidden. During that Time the Scouts of Backnang stayed in the underground and only met in Secret. After the Year 1945 the tribe managed to regain members.

==== Japan ====
The first Boy Scout troop in Japan was organized in Yokohama in 1911 by Clarence Griffin. The boys of the troop were mostly British students of St. Joseph College, a boys' school in the Bluff area of Yokohama, and Clarence Griffin organized the troop under English charter. Clarence Griffin is recognized by the Scout Association of Japan as Japan's first Scoutmaster and is honoured with an inscription as such at his final resting place in the Yokohama Foreign General Cemetery. In 1918 Marianist Bro. Joseph Janning, a missionary teacher of St. Joseph College, assumed the position of Scoutmaster at the school and opened the Troop to boys of all nationalities. The Group subsequently became the first directly registered group of the newly formed Boy Scouts International Bureau, receiving a Charter signed by B–P formally allowing the group to accept "Scouts of mixed nationalities". The group was registered by the World Scout Bureau as "Troop 1, International Boy Scouts" and has remained continuously active in Yokohama since its formation.

==== Macao ====
Macao, at the time administered by the Portuguese, saw its first Scout troop founded by Lieutenant Álvaro de Melo Machado, the nominated interim governor of the territory. After resigning from the post the following year, Lt. Machado returned to Lisbon, and carried his fostering of scouting to mainland Portugal.

=== 1912 ===
==== Portugal ====
In the Lisbon area there was at least one documented group started this year, with spotty records pointing to the existence of others around the mainland, all fostered by the Portuguese YMCA (ACM). This first group, along with the one started by Lieutenant Álvaro Machado upon his return from Macao, would later (in 1913) join to form the Associação dos Escoteiros de Portugal (AEP), which is active to this day.

=== 1913 ===
==== Greece ====
In Greece, Mark Mindler established in 1913 the third Sea Scout troop of Athens (3η Ομάς Αθηνών Ναυτοπροσκόπων) as the first Scouting group of the country. (The first and second Scouting groups were to be established later for training Scout officers.) The group operates to this day.

=== 1918 ===
==== Mysore State ====
The Chamundi Scout Group was started in December1918 by its founder M.H.R.(Mallasandra Hanumantharao Ramachandrarao) (05/05/1899-18/01/1982). as the first Open Group to be started in India & the then called Mysore State. 1918 is a year of Historical importance since the 1914-1918 war breathing a sigh of relief. The Boy Scout Movement was then taking its roots in the state. The Group consisted of Scout Section only when it was formed. A cub pack was added in 1924 and it became complete in 1924 when a rover crew was started.

When S.R.Nanjundaiah's Hindu A.V School which was in a private building at Sultanpet, got accommodation at the Govt. Middle School, Siddikutte (Seegebeli) the Troop started its activities in the school compound. Later the group moved its operations to Naranarayana Choultry at the Market Square in Old Police Road. In course group secured A roon Tippu Sultan palace with the help of Sri. Subba Rao, the then Organising Commissioner, The Boy Scouts of Mysore.

It was here troop had all the facilities for scouting group committee was formed with Late Ananda Rao Sirsi, the then Municipal President, who was succeeded by Sri.K.Chandy, the Revenue Commissioner who later became the member of council, Sri Belvadi Ramaswamiah, Revenue Commissioner, Rao Sahib Channaiah, District Judge, N. Madhava Rao, chief secretary to government later became the 23rd Deewan of Mysore, Dr. Subba Rao, senior surgeon, D.V.Gundappa, K. Shankarnarayana Rao, Major Y.V.K Murthy, Dr. V.K. Badami and others. K. Netkallapa continued to be one of the Vice Presidents.

The group had branches in Old Sringeri Mutt, Chamrajpet, Shankar Puram. In order to cater to the needs of the units "Siddikutte" Local Association was formed and later merged with "City Local Association" to extend its activities. The group leader was the Secretary in the year 1928 this association was merged with "City District Association" one of our Vice-presidents Major Y.V.K Murthy became the District Scout Commissioner and one of the parents Dr. Gopakrishna Rao became the Secretary.

===== Royal patronage =====
The group has the proud legacy of being adopted as the Maharaja's Own Troop after winning the All India First Aid Mace at the All India competitions held at Nandi Hills in 1924.

M.H.R. was Baloo for sometime to the Prince Jayachamaraja Wadiyar.

On a special invitation in 1931 the group and its members including parents and well wishers attend a Hi-Tea party at the Bangalore Palace hosted by the chief Scout Sri Kanteerava Narasimharaja Wadiyar and chief cub Jayachamaraja Wadiyar.

The wheel of the group had rolled from place to place in the first fifty years. One must recollect how the Scout group was tossed from place to place before establishing its land in November 1941 on the solid rock it stands today with the efforts of Late.M.R.Narsimha Iyengar Group Scout Master and Secretary of the Group Committee. There was no den until the year 1957 with the sincere effort of Bros. V.Rangaswamy and M.Nagaraj the group put up a small den.

== See also ==
- Scouting memorials
- Scouting museums
