= Scout county (The Scout Association) =

A Scout County (also Scout Area) is an administrative division within The Scout Association of the United Kingdom. As of October 2011 there were 115 Counties and Areas in the United Kingdom. These bodies are responsible for providing programmes and support for their member Scout Districts.

The term County is used by England and Northern Ireland, while Area is used in Wales and Region in Scotland. For the purposes of this article, the term County is used where County, Area or Region can be applied.

== Organisation ==
Counties are led by a County Commissioner (who is appointed by the Chief Scout), who is supported by a team of Assistant County Commissioners and an Executive Committee.

Counties are themselves divided into Districts. The average County will have around 10 Districts, and around 3,900 members (of which 3,150 are under 18).

Counties are responsible for the provision of the Scout Network, as well as supporting all Scouting activities within their member Districts.

== Scout Counties in England ==
There are currently 58 counties in England. They are:

- Avon
- Bedfordshire
- Berkshire
- Birmingham
- Buckinghamshire
- Cambridgeshire
- Central Yorkshire
- Cheshire
- Cleveland
- Cornwall
- Coventry
- Cumbria
- Derbyshire
- Devon
- Dorset
- Durham
- East Lancashire
- East Sussex
- Essex
- Gloucestershire
- Hampshire
- Hereford and Worcester
- Hertfordshire
- Humberside
- Isle of Wight
- Kent
- Leicestershire
- Lincolnshire
- Greater London Middlesex West
- Greater London North
- Greater London North East
- Greater London South
- Greater London South East
- Greater London South West
- Greater Manchester East
- Greater Manchester North
- Greater Manchester West
- Merseyside
- Norfolk
- Northamptonshire
- Northumberland
- North Yorkshire
- Nottinghamshire
- Oxfordshire
- Shropshire
- Solihull
- Somerset
- South Yorkshire
- Staffordshire
- Suffolk
- Surrey
- Warwickshire
- West Lancashire
- West Mercia
- West Sussex
- West Yorkshire
- Wiltshire

== Scout Counties in Northern Ireland ==
- Antrim
- Armagh
- Belfast
- Down
- Fermanagh
- Londonderry
- Tyrone

== Scout Regions in Scotland ==
- Highlands and Islands
- North East
- East
- South East
- Forth
- Clyde
- West
- South West

== Scout Areas in Wales ==
- Brecknock
- Cardiff and Vale
- Carmarthenshire
- Ceredigion
- Clwyd
- Glamorgan
- Gwent
- Mid Glamorgan
- Montgomeryshire
- Snowdonia and Anglesey
- Pembrokeshire
- Radnor

== Scout Areas outside of the United Kingdom ==
- British Scouting Overseas

== See also ==
- Local councils of the Boy Scouts of America
