= Boyton Cross =

Hamlet in Essex, England

Coordinates: 51.757°N 0.388°E

- Location within Essex
- OS grid reference: TL6509
- Shire county: Essex
- Region: East
- Country: England
- Sovereign state: United Kingdom
- Police: Essex
- Fire: Essex
- Ambulance: East of England

Boyton Cross is a hamlet in Essex, England. It is approximately half a mile from the village of Roxwell and is situated mainly along the A1060 road which runs from Bishop's Stortford to Chelmsford. There is a pub (The Hare, which was refurbished in 2010). Commercial premises include a variety of farms & privately hired industrial units.

The hamlet has been the site of the multi-annual Essex International Jamboree since 2012.
