= Scout Network =

- Scout Network section logo
- Owner: The Scout Association
- Age range: 18–25
- Country: United Kingdom
- Founded: 2001
- Membership: 8,143 (January 2023)
Previous; Explorer Scouts; Explorer Sea Scouts; Explorer Air Scouts	

Scout Network uniform	Adult leader uniform

The Scout Network is the sixth and final youth section of the Scout Association in the United Kingdom, catering for those aged between 18 and 25 years. The section was formally introduced in February 2002 alongside Explorer Scouts, with both replacing the former Venture Scouts section for fifteen-and-a-half to twenty-year-olds.

Its programme is structured differently from the other sections, focusing on achieving the top awards of the section, such as the King's Scout award rather than other badges. It is largely self run by the members of the section, as opposed to being led by a team of adult leaders.

== History ==
=== Trials: 1994-2001 ===
Scout Network was created as a result of the Scout Association's Programme Review that began in 1995. Throughout the 1990s, the Scout Association had been losing 30,000 members each year and so a new programme was developed to be implemented in the new millennium. A working group looking into a possible provision for 18-25 year olds was established in September 1994 and ran until November 1995 when it was dispanded and its findings used to create a second working group which put those plans into action. Running from 1996 until 1998, this second working group, and the subsequent year long trial afterwards, created a blueprint for a new section that would "comprise a collection of motivated individuals, willing to initiate and participate in activities and opportunities created or accessed by themselves" called "The Scout Network" and run nationally.

The outcome of these trials was that the section was of great benefit, especially for enabling social interaction between members who had other roles within Scouting either as leaders or Venture Scouts, but that the proposed 'choices' programme did not work in practice and that to initiate activities and "achieve interaction between members" smaller groups would be needed rather than a national structure. Many of their recommendations would form part of the eventual Scout Network section and the structure it would take. Some of the national members involved in the project would go on to have prominent roles within the Scout Association; Tim Kidd was the National Co-ordinator of The Scout Network and is, as of 2020, the UK Chief Commissioner of the Scout Association while Craig Turpie, formerly the National Communications Manager for The Scout Network, is currently, as of 2020, chairman to the World Scout Committee.

=== Launch ===
The new section was officially launched in February 2002 with all Venture Scout Units switching to the new system by December 2003. The section originally formed part of the Scout County, with responsibility for the Network coming from there, and its members were every member of The Scout Association in the section's age range of 18 to 25 years. The Network would therefore include normal youth members as well as leaders, skills instructors and members of the Scout Fellowship, providing a social base for all members of that age, although no meeting was mandatory. The revised age ranges were chosen to ensure that the Explorer Scout section received a suitable number of members and to align both sections with the age ranges of the Duke of Edinburgh's Award. All meetings were to be led by the Network itself. Because members could come from and take part in several different parts of Scouting, the uniform chosen was the same as that used by adult Leaders and members of the Scout Fellowship (now Scout Active Support).

=== Early years ===
One of the early problems suffered by the Scout Network involved the transition from a four section to a five section system. Of the 18,397 Venture Scouts in 2,612 units in January 2002, only 1,474 made the transfer to Scout Network a year later in 153 different Networks. Scout Network has consistently experienced significantly lower levels of membership when compared to the rest of the movement.

As a result, a review was undertaken over eighteen months between starting in mid-2004. The outcome of this review led to the introduction of Scout Network Leaders to help administer and guide the Network, additional local Networks rather than a single County Network and the introduction of a District Scout Network.

=== 2010s to present ===
In 2012 the section, along with Explorer Scouts, celebrated their tenth anniversaries with a uniform badge available to celebrate the occasion.

Between August and December 2013, a youth consultation was held into the future of Scouting under the title of Be... initiative. The report recommended a digital space for Scout Network members and a number of nationally delivered high quality events on a community, adventure and international theme. In 2015 the structure and programme of Scout Network was changed once again, including the recommendations in the report. That year the Scout Network website was launched with events in different areas of the programme advertised to all members of the movement aged between 18 and 25 years. Responsibility for Scout Network units was handed down to districts with members able to engage in their local Network or the UK Scout Network, run by national commissioners running events and longer-term projects through the website. A series of virtual badges were created through the website allowing members to earn them for completing activities.

In 2018 the Scouts published their Skills for Life plan which included acknowledged that young people drop out of the Scout's 6-25 programme between 14 and 25 years. In response, they aim to conduct a review of the Scout Network provision by 2023.

== Structure ==
=== Launch structure ===
When the section was first launched, the responsibility of Scout Network was the relevant County/Area/Region with a commissioner and administrator providing central management for the section. A role existed for Network Leader, although this was created to provide specific support to create new networks. There was a great deal of flexibility over the formation of local Networks within the County/Area/Region with suggestions including Networks covering an entire county, Networks covering one district and supported by the District, Networks partnered with one group, specialist Networks as part of a specific club or centre or a University Network.

The programme for the section consisted of eight programme zones, those of the top awards and the partnership awards. Activities were meant to link to each programme zone and an adequate balance ensured. The eight zones were outdoors, skills, physical recreation, community service, environment, international, relationships and values.

=== 2006 relaunch ===
Since the review of 2004-2006 there have been three distinct types of Scout Network structure. The first is a modified version of the original structure and sees the Network centrally run and operated by a County/Area/Region. A second allows for multiple Networks in one County as long as each come together for some shared events each year. In addition to this model Networks can also be run on a District level, with the District team taking the roles of the County team, and there are some Specialist Networks, usually based at an Activity Centre, that focuses around certain activities only.

The Leadership structure of a Scout Network consists of a Scout Network Leader, who is essentially an advisor or mentor to the members, and elected members of the Network who help to run it. This usually includes a chairperson and a treasurer to manage the day-to-day affairs of the Network. In larger County networks there can often be large committees made up of representatives from all the Network groups.

The programme was also updated from eight programme zones into three self development areas (International, Community, Skills and Development), different from the structure of the other sections which at this time were unifying the number and content of their programme zones. These new development areas also reflect the requirements for the top awards. The Chief Scout's Platinum award, which matched the Duke of Edinburgh's Bronze award, was removed from the section and reserved for Explorers only.

=== 2015 relaunch ===
In 2015 the structure of Scout Network changed to be entirely district led with one Scout Network per district, with Scout counties providing a support role. Exceptions to this could be applied for, such as for districts running joint Networks or for a County Network to carry on, however this is not encouraged. The District Scout Network Commissioner role was created to support the district Network and to take on the mentoring and advisory role formerly occupied by the Scout Network Leaders. The Scout Network members themselves continue to be in charge of their own programme, now led by appointed programme co-ordinators who support other members in their programme and personal development. If a number of the Scout Network are all working towards the same goal, this is encouraged through the formation of a project team.

The programme is split into three areas (Community, International and Adventure), linking to the recommendations of the Be... Initiative. The activities of the Network are now classified as either a project, long term in nature with a clear goal, or an event, happening on just the one occasion.

== Membership ==
At the launch of Scout Network, a distinction was made between those who participated in a Scout Network programme only and those who held other roles in Scouting as well, such as section leaders or those who are part of the Scout Fellowship. Between 2015 and 2020, any member of the Scout Association aged between 18 and 25 years were automatically classified as a member of Scout Network, regardless of whether they actively take part in a local Scout Network programme. The distinction between active participants and those only holding other Scouting roles was reinstated in 2020 and is reported from that date. Scout Network is coeducational, and as of January 2023, 37.4% of Scout Network exclusive members are female.

Membership of the Scout Network section.
Year	Scout Network members	All 18-25-year-old members	Number of Scout Networks
2002-03	1,474	-	153
2008-09	2,048	4,612	317
2009-10	2,171	5,132	322
2010-11	2,061	4,885	332
2011-12	2,092	5,065	334
2012-13	2,174	5,574	375
2013-14	2,375	5,574	383
2014-15	2,286	-	-
2015-16	5,389	5,389	-
2016-17	7,544	7,544	-
2017-18	13,696	13,696	569
2018-19	14,998	14,998	587
2019-20	16,501	16,501	564
2020-21	9,535	-	579
2021-22	8,854	14,530	578
2022-23	8,143	13,953	553

=== Promise and law ===
Members of Scout Network, in common with other Scouts, make a promise soon after joining the section. This promise is the same as that used for any member of The Scout Association from age ten and a half and includes a promise to do their best, help other people and a duty to a higher purpose. There are different variations of the promise to accommodate members of different faiths (and none) and whether they are a resident of the United Kingdom.

The promise also requires the member to follow the Scout law. These seven statements are also common to all members of the Scout Association from age ten and half upwards and, with the promise, reinforces the values of the movement.

== Awards ==
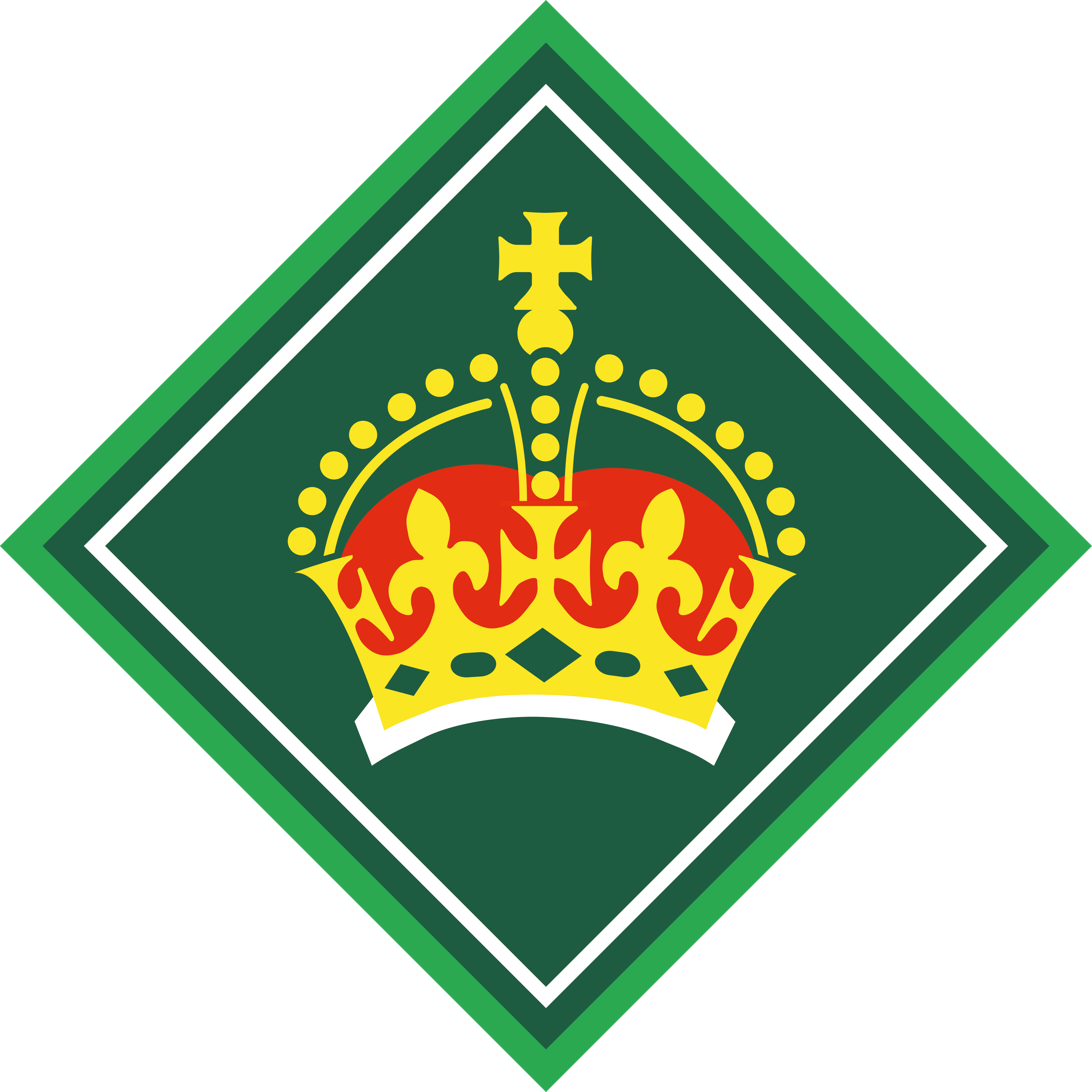
The King's Scout Award badge

In contrast to other Scout sections, members of the Scout Network cannot achieve any Challenge or Activity badges with the programme instead focusing on skills that could help in future life.

Scout Network members are able to work towards the Chief Scout's Diamond Award and the King's Scout Award (Queen's Scout Award from 2001 to 2022). These awards share a similar structure to the Duke of Edinburgh's Award scheme and these latter awards can be used to complete the Scouting equivalent. The awards require members to undertake an extended period of physical activity, voluntary service and skill improvement as well as an expedition and a residential experience for the Queen's Scout Award. The King's Scout Award in particular is considered the top award for Scout Network members and includes a presentation at Windsor Castle for those who achieve the award.

In addition to those two awards, the Network members can also undertake the Explorer Belt Award, which was pre-existing from Venture Scouts, and allows members to undertake a 10-day international expedition and the International Scouts of the World Award which focuses on making a social impact through an international journey. Until its discontinuation in 2015, Network members could also earn the Partnership Awards for working on large-scale projects with another group.

== Visual identity ==
=== Uniform ===
The Scout Network is a uniformed movement as part of the Scouts. Unlike the younger sections, which have their own distinct uniform style, the Scout Network share their uniform with other adult volunteers and leaders. This consists of a cream coloured (described as 'stone' by the Scout Association) shirt or blouse, a neckerchief determined by the Network themselves, navy blue trousers or skirt and scout belt. Designed by Meg Andrew in 2000, they were designed to be suitable for activity wear and outdoor use while also being stylish and affordable. Following the 2006 review, a Scout Network identifying badge was added to the uniform to tell members apart from other volunteers, located on the right chest. The design of this badge was updated in 2015 and 2019 to reflect the updated logo for the section.

Scout Network members with links to a Sea Scout or Air Scout group, either through a role as a leader or through links as a Scout Network, may instead wear the uniform of those divisions. These consist of a light blue shirt or blouse instead of the cream colour of 'land' members and the addition of a hat; a peaked cap for Sea Scouts and a beret for Air Scouts.

=== Flags ===
Similar to other sections, Scout Networks have a designated flag design. In England, Wales and Northern Ireland the flag is grey with white location name, a white scout emblem on a purple circular background in the middle of the flag and the scout motto 'Be Prepared' underneath is small white lettering. The flag in Scotland uses similar colours, with the addition of a St. Andrew's Cross next to the hoist.

=== Logo and visual identity ===
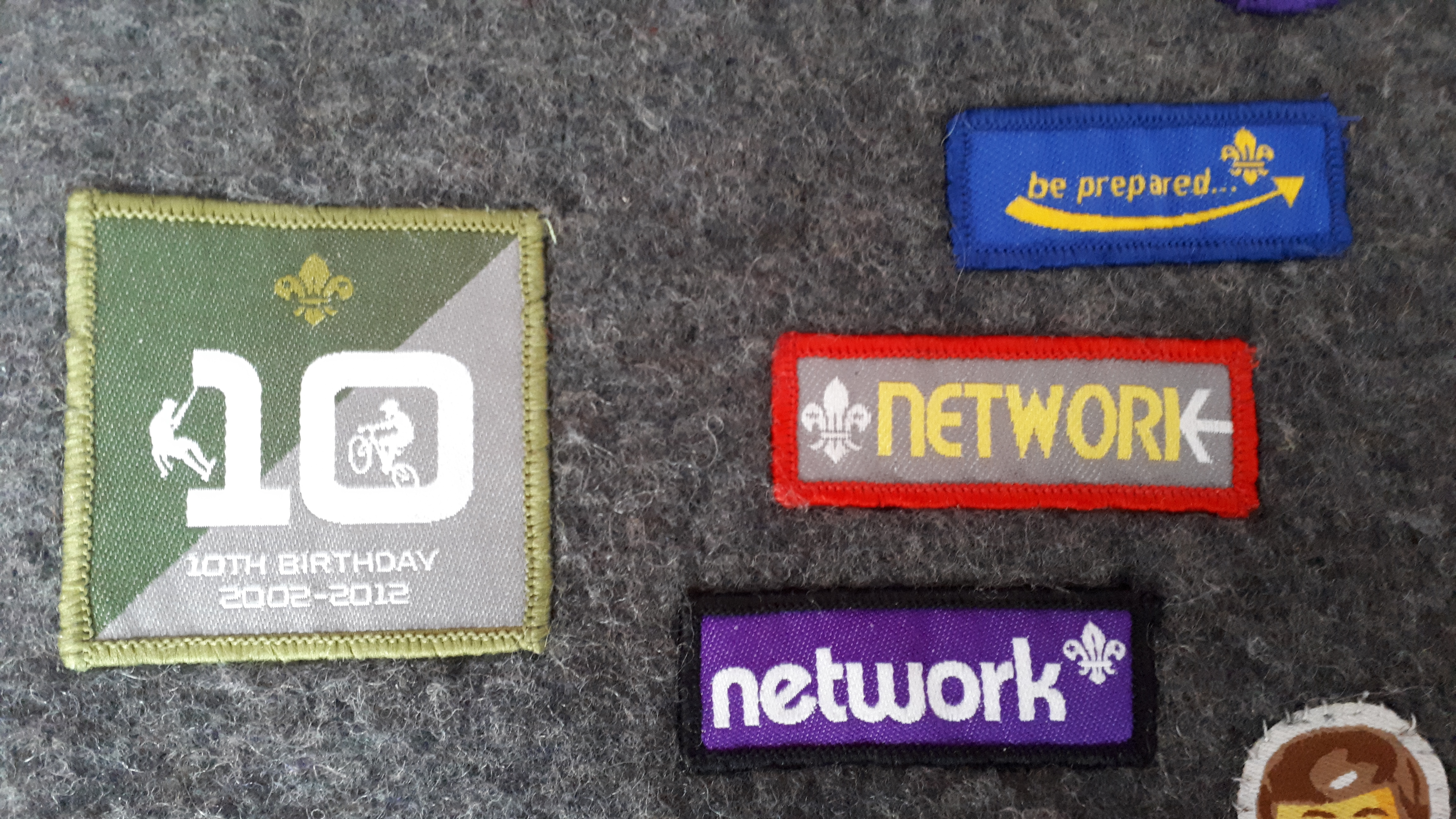
Scout Network badges on camp blanket. On the left is the 10th Anniversary badge, while on the right, top to bottom, is the Moving on award for Network, the 2006 design Network identifying badge and the 2015 design Network identifying badge.

Upon launch in 2002, the Scout Network section had a rectangular grey logo with 'Network' written in yellow in the Casady & Greene font Highland Gothic with the K at the end of the logo transformed into an arrow from the righthand edge of the logo. Scout Network publications at this time also used the Highland Gothic typeface for headings, with Frutiger used for body text in line with the rest of the association. In 2013, revised guidelines were produced which allowed for the logo to be extended to the right, emphasising the arrow, and introducing a six-degree angle to publications in line with the rest of the association style.

In 2015, the Scout Association updated their visual identity style, including the section brands, to focus on the Scouting fleur-de-lis. The new Scout Network logo was a thick, black lower case wordmark with a small fleur-de-lis either located to the top right of the wordmark or a larger version located directly above the wordmark. Publications moved away from pictures and instead featured an artwork style that the association described as being "Editorial, sophisticated, expressive". The typeface used was brought into line with the rest of the association, with TheSerif used for headings.

When the Scout Association brand was updated in May 2018, with a new and stylised fleur-de-lis, the Scout Network logo was altered to remove the previous fleur-de-lis mark. Publications either continued the use of the previous artwork or used the new image style of the association, with the Google Fonts typeface Nunito Sans used.

== Events ==
There are a number of national and international events open to Scout Network members in addition to projects and events held at more local levels and open to members from outside the immediate area. In contrast to the younger sections, there are currently no national events run by the Scout Association for Scout Network members alone; Gilwell Reunion based at Gilwell Park in North London and held in September each year is open to Scout Network members and has a focus on supporting all adults in Scouting through programme ideas but also hosts social events and adventurous activities that those on site can take part in.

Between 2004 and 2017, Avon Scout Network ran Intense, a social and activity weekend at Woodhouse Park specifically for Scout Network members. When Woodhouse Park joined the Scout Activity Centres network in April 2011, Intense began appearing as a national event although the team running the event remained the same. The signature activity of Intense was the 'piano bash' where teams raced to cut up a piano and fit the pieces through a letter box. The last event was held in 2017 with the team announcing the end of Intense in March 2018.

=== International events ===
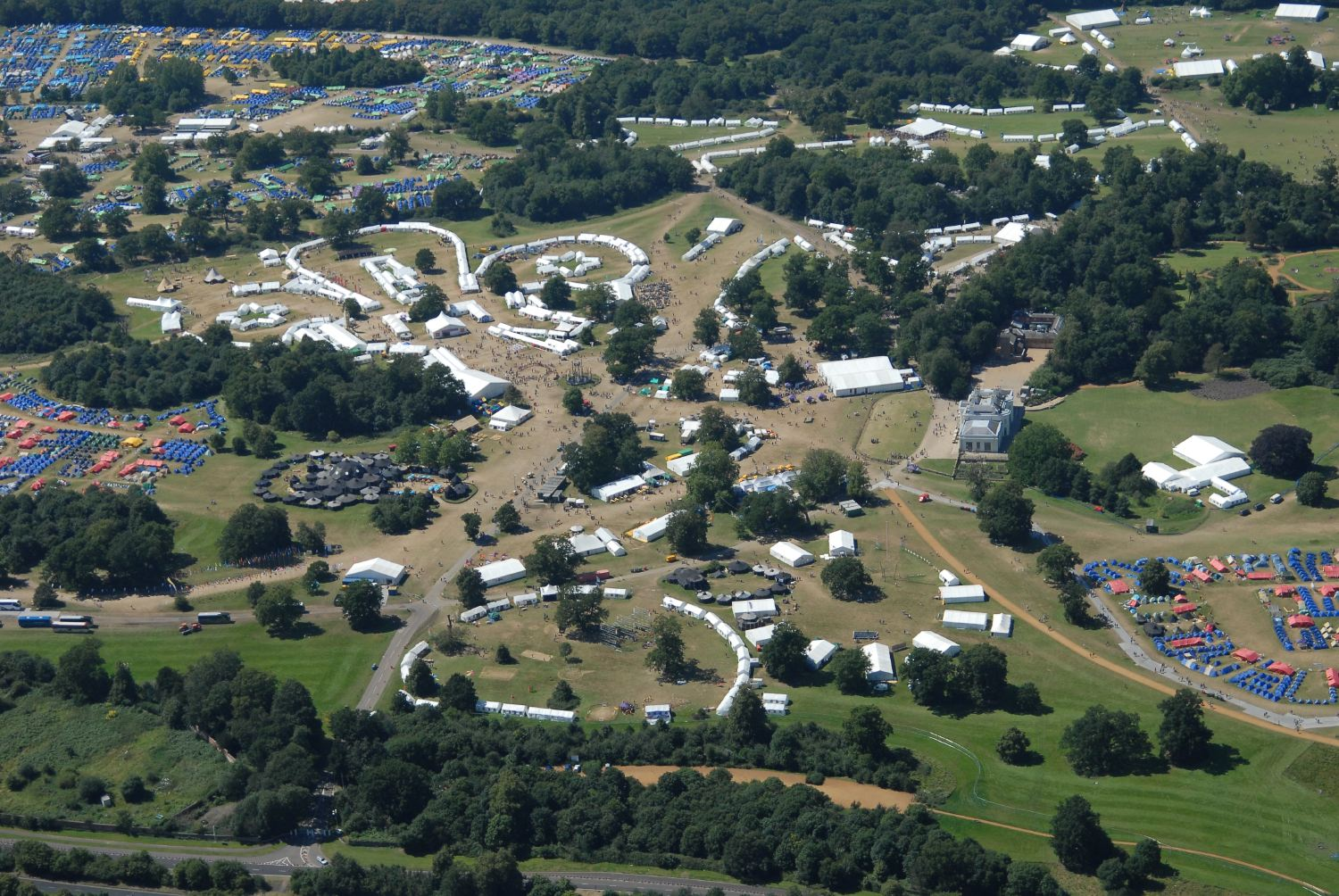
The campsite of the 21st World Scout Jamboree held in 2007 in the UK.

Scout Network members are eligible to join World Scout Jamborees as International Service team members, supporting the approximately 4,000 Explorer Scouts who attend the WSJ every four years in countries across the world. The purpose of the event is to take part in activities with Scouts from across the world with some 45,000 scouts from 152 countries at the most recent 24th World Scout Jamboree at the Summit Bechtel Reserve, United States.

Network members are also able to attend the World Scout Moot as participants which, like a World Scout Jamboree, takes place every four years in countries across the world. The next Moot is due to take place in Portugal in 2025.

=== National Scout events ===
In place of events run by the Scout Association directly, there are a number of other events run by Scout bodies across the UK which are open to Scout Network members across the UK as participants and more which accept members in leadership, instructor and team roles.

The Apex Challenge events range in duration from a day to a weekend and consist of teams of Explorer Scouts or Scout Network members navigating between a variety of adventurous activity bases over a wide area, usually in Yorkshire, Derbyshire or Nottinghamshire. The 2018 event at Bramham Park in West Yorkshire attracted nearly 400 participants and involved kayaking, mountain biking and tomahawk throwing as signature activities.

The Dragnet challenge is a 30 miles (48 km) navigation challenge over a weekend in July in the Lake District. Teams of Explorer Scouts or Scout Network members have to navigate from an unknown starting point to the known end point while avoiding capture.

There are multiple Monopoly Runs each year that take place in London based on the board game of the same name. All focus on visiting various points around the city in a speedy time with some choosing their own points each year and others using the places on the standard board game.

The Network Gathering is the original Network only event, unique in being a four-day event across Easter Weekend held annually since 2004. Originally hosted at Great Tower Scout Adventures, it has now moved to the Gladstone Centre, in Flintshire, North Wales. The event features an array of different activities tailored to a different theme each year. As well as social activities in the evening, activities offered include indoor/outdoor climbing, walking in North Wales, canoeing, mountain biking and ghee scrambling. It is an event open to all Scout Network members from across the United Kingdom.

The Network Festival originated in 2005 it is hosted in Coventry and run by the Scout Network in that location. It is themed each year with activities and fancy dress linking in to this; activities are varied and tend towards social, competitions and other outdoor activities. It is exclusively open to Scout Network members.

Revolution is based on the Isle of Wight, and is open to Explorer Scouts, Scout Network members and members of the Student Scout and Guide Organisation. It celebrated its 25th event in 2019, having begun in 1995 as a Venture Scout event. The theme changes each year with the activities, based off-site around the island, linked in to the theme: the 2018 event for example had a theme of the 'Greatest Show on Earth' and all the activities linked in to 'Great' figures for example archery for Robin Hood and drumming for Dave Grohl.

Former events include the aforementioned Intense, the Sedan Chair rally held until 2013 in Buckinghamshire and EVO in Hampshire.

== See also ==
- The Scout Association - The parent organisation of the Scout Network section.
- Explorer Scouts (The Scout Association) - The preceding section in the UK Scout Association for 14 to 18 year olds.
- Age Groups in Scouting and Guiding
- Rover Scout - Equivalent age group in other Scout organisations.
- Venture Scout - Equivalent age group in other Scout organisations and the section used prior to Scout Network's creation.
