= Girlguiding Anglia =

Girlguiding Anglia is one of the nine Countries and Regions of Girlguiding UK. It is further subdivided into twelve Girlguiding Counties. These are not the same as the counties defined by the British government.

== Counties ==
Girlguiding Anglia is subdivided into twelve counties. These are:

- Bedfordshire
- Buckinghamshire
- Cambridgeshire West
- Cambridgeshire East
- Essex North East
- Essex South East
- Essex West
- Hertfordshire
- Lincolnshire South
- Norfolk
- Oxfordshire
- Suffolk

== Campsites and Activity Centres ==
=== Hautbois Residential and Activity Centre ===
Hautbois is the Residential and Activity Centre owned by Girlguiding Anglia. The Region's office are located on the estate. It is located on the outskirts of Coltishall, near the city of Norwich.

Hautbois was built in the 19th century. It has been owned by Girlguiding Anglia since 1984 and has been a Residential and Activity Centre since 1988. It has had links with Guiding since the early part of the 20th century. Its previous owners, Beth and Phillipa Patteson were committed Guides from childhood and the property had often been used for Guiding activities.

Hautbois House

Training and Dining Room Extension in 2007
