= Scouting and Guiding in the Northern Territory =

Scouting and Guiding in the Northern Territory is predominantly represented by the branches of Scouts Australia and Girl Guides Australia covering the Northern Territory.

== History ==
The 1st Darwin Scout Group in Darwin was registered in 1928 under the command of Captain Len Samut. At that time it was registered with The Boy Scouts Association New South Wales Branch, but its registration passed to the association's Queensland Branch in 1929. The first group registered in Alice Springs was in 1936, but there are suggestions that Scouting had been operating there since 1923. The first Group to be formed in Tennant Creek was in 1941, and the first group to be formed in Katherine was in 1957, giving Scouting a presence in the main Territory towns. Registration passed from The Boy Scouts Association's Queensland Branch to its South Australian Branch in 1955. At that time, Scouting had not fully recovered from the Second World War and only two troops, 2nd Darwin and 1st Alice Springs, were recorded as operating.

Details with a photograph in the Chinese-Australian Historical Images in Australia (CHIA) database state that the 1st Scout Troop finished in 1931 and that the 2nd Darwin Scout Troop was established by Jo Ruddict in 1938.

The Scout Association of Australia formed a Northern Territory Area in 1973. On 1 April 1989, The Scout Association of Australia, Northern Territory Branch was formed. Commodore Eric Johnston, then Administrator of the NT became Chief Scout of the NT Branch and was sworn in by Asche, then Chief Justice of the Northern Territory. Successive Administrators of the Northern Territory have been Chief Scouts of the NT Branch.

Northern Territory
- Owner: Scouts Australia
- Country: Australia

== Current provision ==
=== Scouts ===
There were 12 Scout Groups in 2013, includes those in Darwin (Darwin Sea Scouts) and its northern suburbs (Alawa and Sanderson), Berrimah, Palmerston, Howard Springs, Humpty Doo, Batchelor, Katherine, Nhulunbuy, Groote Eylandt, Alice Springs., All affiliated to Scouts Australia. There is a campsite maintained by the branch at Woorabinda at Howard Spring Nature Reserve. The previous campsite at Darwin River was returned to Crown Land in 2013 as it was unable to be maintained after bushfires in 2000. The Chief Commissioner is Nichole Vincent.

=== Girl Guides ===
Girl Guides Australia's Territory Office is in Parap, Darwin. There were 7 Guide units in 2008 and 15 Guide Units in 2013 in the Territory including units in Darwin, Palmerston/Litchfield, Katherine, Tennant Creek and Alice Springs. The State Commissioner is Linda Durran.

== See also ==
- Baden-Powell Scouts' Association
