= Scout district =

A Scout district is an administrative division within some Scouting and Guiding organisations.

Districts are responsible for providing programme and support for local Scout and Guide groups, although the precise relationship and structure of a district does vary from country to country.

== United Kingdom ==
=== The Scout Association ===
The Scout Association currently has 895 Scout districts across the United Kingdom. Each district is responsible for providing programme and support for its member Scout groups, and is in turn supported by a Scout county.

==== Organisation ====
Districts consist of, on average, about 10 Scout groups which provide scouting for members between the ages of 6 and 14. They also have a number of Explorer Scout units to provide for 14- to 18-year-olds, and may have a locally operated Scout Network for 18- to 25-year-olds.

Each District is led by a district lead volunteer who is supported by the district leadership team. Ideally, a programme team member is appointed for each of the 4 sections in order to provide support and communication between sections in different Scout Groups.

If there are Explorer Scout units, young leaders, or a Scout network in the district, then there will also be a 14-24 team to support all volunteers in Explorer, Young Leader, and Scout Network sections. They help these section teams plan and deliver programmes for young people.

As well as the uniformed members of the district team, there is an executive body which manages the finances of the district and act as a steering committee to determine how support is provided to the groups.

=== Girlguiding UK ===
Girlguiding UK also uses the district system as part of the organisation. Guide Districts do not necessarily cover the same boundaries as their Scouting counterparts.

== United States ==
Both the Boy Scouts of America and Girl Scouts of the USA have district-level administrative bodies, below that of local Scout councils. The key administrative person is the district executive.

== Scouts Australia ==
Districts in Scouts Australia are groups of varying numbers Scout Groups, set to a geographic area. They are led by the District Commissioner who is supported by District Leaders for each Section, and for other tasks such as Adult Training, Development (often combined in the same person) Water Activities, the warden of any District owned campsite, as well as the District Executive, a committee of Lay Scouters who are responsible for fundraising and other tasks. In a holdover from the old boys-only days, some districts have a Ladies Auxiliary. Each District is subsidiary to a Region

In contrast to the other Sections, Rovers have no official connection to their district, except in cases of District Rover Crews, although informal District Rover Forums are held in some Districts, and some Districts have an official District Rover Advisor.

In the Northern Territory, there are no districts, and only two regions.

== See also ==
- Scout county (The Scout Association)
- Local councils of the Boy Scouts of America
