= Scouting and Guiding in New Zealand =

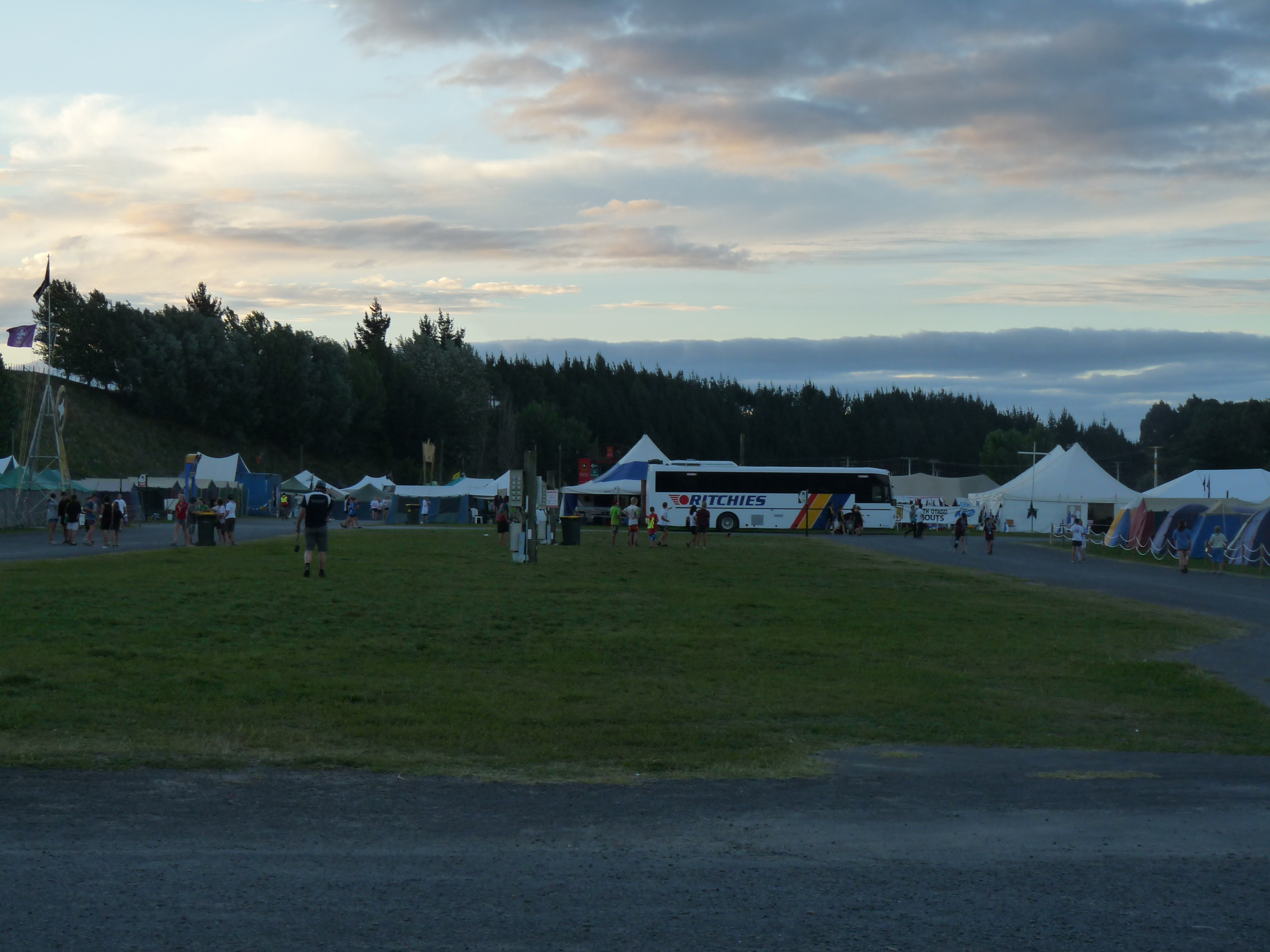
Campsites at the 19th New Zealand Scout Jambor

The Scout and Guide movement in New Zealand is served by

- GirlGuiding New Zealand, member of the World Association of Girl Guides and Girl Scouts
- Scouts Aotearoa, member of the World Organization of the Scout Movement

== History ==
Scouting in New Zealand began in 1908 and spread rapidly throughout the country. The first group of Boy Scouts was formed in Kaiapoi, Canterbury in April 1908. A cairn on the bank of the Kaiapoi River, near Wylie Park, commemorates the first patrols formed. It lists the names of the boys and the Scoutmaster. Another group of Boy Scouts, in Parnell, also claims this honour but the Parnell Scouts' documentation has been lost.

=== Dominion Boy Scouts ===
Major (later Lieutenant-Colonel) David Cossgrove centrally organised Boy Scouts in 1908 and formed the Dominion Boy Scouts. The Dominion Boy Scouts and Robert Baden-Powell's Boy Scouts Association affiliated in 1913 in an uneasy relationship. Cossgrove's Dominion Boy Scouts introduced a Senior Scout program called "Sentinels" in 1912 and, in 1913, "Junior Scouts" with "Bull Pups" programs. After 1916 some Junior Scouts operated "Wolf Cub" programs. Cossgrove died in 1920 and in 1923 the majority of the executive of the Dominion Boy Scouts reconstituted themselves as a branch of The Boy Scouts Association of the United Kingdom.

=== Girl Peace Scouts ===
Cossgrove also formed the Girl Peace Scouts in 1909 which extended beyond New Zealand and Australia. The Girl Peace Scouts in New Zealand merged with the Girl Guides Association in 1923.

=== Chums Scout Patrols ===
The Chums magazine recorded the existence of its Chums Scouts in New Zealand from 1908.

=== British Boy Scouts ===
The British Boy Scouts also had members in New Zealand from 1909 with troops still reported in 1914.

=== Life Saving Scouts and Guards of the Salvation Army ===
Local Corps of The Salvation Army formed troops of Boy Scouts in New Zealand from 1908 and Girl Peace Scouts from 1909. In 1911 The Salvation Army began reorganising its Boy Scouts and, in 1913, it started its international Life Saving Scouts in New Zealand. In 1915, the Salvation Army started its Life Saving Guards for girls in New Zealand. Chums, for boys, and Sunbeams, for girls, were for established for younger children. In 1916 the Salvation Army Life Saving Scouts and the Dominion Boy Scouts affiliated. A Territorial Life-saving Scout and Guard Organiser, Ensign A.H. Charker, was appointed in 1918. The popular reputation of the Salvation Army from the 1914-18 World War I and misgivings over the demise of the Dominion Boy Scouts and establishment of The Boy Scouts Association New Zealand Branch increased the popularity of the Life Saving Scouts in the 1920s and, as a charity and mission work of The Salvation Army, the Life Saving Scouts continued to be successful in New Zealand during the economic depression of the 1930s.

=== The Boy Scouts Association ===
In 1923, The Boy Scouts Association of the United Kingdom formed a branch in New Zealand, which is now The Scout Association of New Zealand.
