= Postscript (disambiguation) =

A postscript is most often a sentence or paragraph added after the signature of a letter.

Postscript or PostScript may also refer to:

== Arts and entertainment ==
- PostScript Magazine, a British student magazine
- "Postscript", a song by Pet Shop Boys from the 1993 album Very
- "Post Script", a song by Finch from the album What It Is to Burn
- Postscripts, a former quarterly British magazine

== Other uses ==
- PostScript, a page description and programming language for electronic publishing

== See also ==
- PS (disambiguation)
