= Arthur W. V. Reeve =

Arthur Reeve MBE
- Born: Arthur Wellesley Vivian Reeve; 2 December 1912; Auckland, New Zealand
- Died: 21 May 2002 (aged 89); Wellington, New Zealand
- Occupations: Post office employee, author, international scout commissioner
- Spouse: Jacqueline Lorraine Taylor (m. 1944)
- Children: Three
- Writing career
- Notable work: Cradle of Rugby (1992)
- Notable awards: MBE, Scouting Bronze Wolf Award

Arthur Wellesley Vivian Reeve MBE (2 December 1912 – 21 May 2002) was a New Zealand author and The Scout Association of New Zealand’s international commissioner who was awarded the Bronze Wolf Award for exceptional services to Scouting.

== Personal life ==
Reeve was born in Auckland on 2 December 1912, the son of Ethel Mary Whitta and her husband Benjamin Alfred Reeve. He was educated at Eastbourne and West Christchurch Primary Schools. He married Jacqueline Lorraine Taylor on 5 February 1944, at St Matthew's Church, in the Wellington suburb of Brooklyn, and they had three children. He was involved in the Masonic Lodge and St Matthew’s Church in Brooklyn, Wellington. He became chairman of the Wellington branch of the Royal Forest and Bird Protection Society. He died in Wellington on 21 May 2002 from cancer.

== Working life ==
Reeve joined the New Zealand government Post and Telegraph Department as a telegram delivery boy in 1929. He retired from the New Zealand Post Office in 1971, as its assistant principal public relations officer. He had been involved in the organisation of international conferences in Wellington, including for SEATO, the Colombo Plan, the Commonwealth Parliamentary Association, and the Pacific Basin Economic Council in 1972.

== Scouting ==
Reeve was a scout in the St Matthew's Scout Group in Christchurch in 1926. He later became its scoutmaster. He resigned from St Matthew's Scout Group in 1936 (letter dated 11 December 1936 in the troop log book) but kept in contact and visited the group.

=== Scout Association of New Zealand ===
The Boy Scouts Association (New Zealand Branch) appointed him as a district scoutmaster, commissioner for Pacific Island Scouting and international commissioner. It presented Reeve with its Silver Wolf Award, and its highest award, its Silver Tui.

In the 1978 New Year Honours, Reeve was appointed a Member of the Order of the British Empire, for services to scouting.

In 1979, The World Organization of the Scout Movement presented Reeve with its highest award, its Bronze Wolf Award, awarded in recognition of "outstanding service by an individual to the World Scout Movement".

== Rugby ==
Reeve was an avid follower of rugby union, and a life member of the Wellington Rugby Football Union. He donated a trophy, the Arthur Reeve Cup, which is contested in the Wellington Secondary Schools rugby competition in the under-80 kg grade. It was first awarded in 1989.

After injuring his leg playing rugby at 19, he joined the Scottish Harriers, and was elected vice president.

Reeve was a rugby columnist for over 23 years for Rugby News and then the Sunday Times. He wrote a history of college rugby, Cradle of Rugby, published in 1992.
