= Mona Burgin =

New Zealand teacher

Mona Burgin MBE
- Born: Annie Mona Burgin; 11 March 1903; Kirk Michael, Isle of Man
- Died: 15 June 1985 (aged 82); Howick, New Zealand

Annie Mona Burgin MBE (11 March 1903 – 15 June 1985), usually known as Mona Burgin, was a New Zealand teacher who was active in the Girl Guiding movement. She is principally known for her role training adults.

== Biography ==
Burgin was the daughter of Anglican clergyman John Robert Burgin and his wife, Henrietta Jane Woollcombe. Born on the Isle of Man, she came to New Zealand with her family at the age of 6. At age 17, she began training as a teacher at Auckland Training College. Burgin taught junior boys at Dilworth School from 1929 until 1960. Then she became headmistress of Hilltop School, remaining there until her retirement in 1968.

While still a teenager, Burgin corresponded with and met Lieutenant Colonel David Cossgrove, the founder of the Girl Peace Scouts' Association. She revived interest in the movement in Auckland and started the St Andrew's Girl Peace Scout Troop in Epsom in 1921 as their Guider. In 1923, this group became the Epsom Cavell Company. In 1932, she spent a year in the UK, to gain experience and qualifications. Back in New Zealand, Burgin started the Rahiri Ranger Company in 1939.

Burgin was leader of the first GIS team into Germany after World War II. Later, she led the first team from the World Association Training scheme, briefed to find and support Guides living in displaced persons' camps. She was awarded the Silver Fish, the highest international guiding honour, in 1945. In 1946, after she returned to New Zealand, she gained the Chief's Diploma.

In the 1950s Burgin wrote the first New Zealand handbooks for Guides and Rangers, based on the British programme, but with local variation. Her teaching and training methods had a significant influence on the shaping of the Girl Guide movement in New Zealand. In the 1959 Queen's Birthday Honours, she was appointed a Member of the Order of the British Empire, for services to the Girl Guide Movement. She held several national positions, including Commissioner for Training, Commissioner for Camping, (both relinquished in 1948) and National Ranger Adviser (1953–64).

Burgin never married, and died at her home in Howick, Auckland, on 15 June 1985. She was cremated at Purewa Cemetery, and her ashes were buried at All Saints Howick Church.

Every year on 22 February, known as "Thinking Day" Rangers from Mona's Unit set off before dawn, while it is still dark, and they climb to the top of Maungawhau / Mount Eden.

GirlGuiding New Zealand Foundation Mona Burgin Scholarship is a scholarship enabling adult leaders from New Zealand to attend an overseas or New Zealand event or training, in order to refresh their enthusiasm and gain new ideas.

== Works ==
- (?): Otimai: 1927-77

== See also ==
- GirlGuiding New Zealand
