= David Cossgrove =

New Zealand lieutenant colonel (1852–1920)

Lieutenant Colonel David Cossgrove
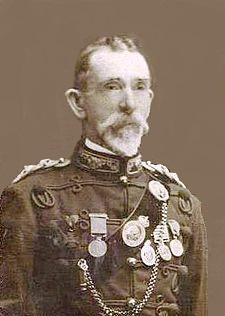
- Born: 20 January 1852; Crosshill, Ayrshire, Scotland
- Died: 23 August 1920 (aged 68); Christchurch, New Zealand
- Military career
- Branch: New Zealand Army
- Service years: 1900–1902
- Rank: Lieutenant-Colonel 1910
- Commands: Captain and Quartermaster, Sixth New Zealand Contingent (19th company), South African War; Captain and Paymaster, Tenth New Zealand Contingent (staff, South Island regiment), South African War
- Awards: Colonial Auxiliary Forces Officers' Decoration; Imperial Volunteer Forces Medal (New Zealand); New Zealand Long and Efficient Service Medal
- Other work: Founder of the Scouts and Peace Scouts in New Zealand; First Dominion Chief Scout (1908); Schoolmaster

Lieutenant Colonel David Cossgrove (1852–1920) of the New Zealand Army served in the South African War – also known as the Second Boer War – with Robert Baden-Powell, founder of Scouts and Guides in the United Kingdom. Cossgrove (also spelled Cosgrove and Crosgrove on official documents) took Baden-Powell's ideas back to New Zealand with him and began similar programmes in Christchurch.

== Life and death ==
Cossgrove was born in Crosshill, in Ayrshire, Scotland, on 20 January 1852 to Elizabeth (née Campbell) and James Crosgrove. At the age of seven, he migrated to New Zealand with his family, arriving in Port Chalmers, Dunedin on the Alpine which sailed from Glasgow on 10 June 1859 and arrived at Otago on 12 September 1859 with his father, James, his mother and three brothers. The family name was changed to Cossgrove shortly after this.

Throughout David Cossgrove's formative years, he was educated at Tokomairiro, while his father ran a flax mill at Akatore. After completing teacher training at the East Taieri School, Cossgrove taught at Sandymount School, on the Otago Peninsula between 1874 and 1880. He was responsible for a rising roll and introducing elementary science to the curriculum. While teaching at Sandymount, he married Selina Robertson in February 1875 in the Otago Peninsular Parish, Dunedin. Reports have been made of his student teacher capacity at East Taieri School; however, no record can be found of this. It is believed that Cossgrove moved on to teaching at another Dunedin school (after leaving Sandymount) in the early part of the 1880s. He was in Westport by 1888 where he took the physical education class at Westport Girls' State School and ran the Naval Cadet Company at Westport Boys' State School.

By the time he volunteered to serve during the South African War in 1900, the Cossgroves were residing in Tuahiwi where David was headmaster of St. Stephen's School (also known as Kaiapoi Native School) and Tuahiwi School, Christchurch, where, in 1902, there were 28 boys and 201 girls. He stayed headmaster of the school from 1899 to 1914 and it was there that he founded the Scouting movement in New Zealand. He was an important community figure as, not only was he the headmaster of the local school, he also dispatched the daily post from 1900 when a Post Office was established at the school house.

It is known that the Cossgroves had a daughter, Muriel, who asked for a girl's equivalent to Scouts, which led to the foundation of GirlGuiding in New Zealand. Another source lists three older daughters named Catherine (who married school teacher George William Aldridge), Selina (who also married a school teacher) and Elfrida (who married Alfred Norman Rickman).

Cossgrove died on 9 September 1920 of stomach cancer and received one of the largest military funerals ever held in Canterbury. He is buried in Bromley Cemetery, Canterbury, New Zealand.

== "Uncle David" ==
A series of articles were printed in the Otago Witness under the name of Uncle David. These took the format of a Natural History Column entitled: "Notes for the Young" followed by various plants and birds described in a fashion suitable for children. These articles continued throughout the early 1880s and have been attributed to David Cossgrove.

== South African War ==
Cossgrove was a quartermaster for the 6th New Zealand Contingent. The contingent were sailed to East London for training on 13 January 1901 on the Cornwall under the command of Lieutenant Colonel J.H. Banks. They were dispatched to South Africa soon after arrival in London, despite the lack of basic supplies such as rifles, revolvers, ammunition, picks, shovels, axes, water buckets and bandoleers. Cossgrove took the men round East London before they travelled to try to do something about the situation. Making the best of the resources around them they bought up the empty wine bottles from various hotels to use for water.

Cossgrove served in Cape Colony, Orange Free State and Transvaal in both 1901 and 1902 as a volunteer serviceman after receiving a second commission as part of the 10th New Zealand Contingent (South Island Regiment), of which he was the Captain and Paymaster. He was granted the rank of lieutenant colonel in 1910 and was awarded the Colonial Auxiliary Forces Officers' Decoration, the Imperial Volunteer Forces Medal, the New Zealand Long and Efficient Service Medal and is on the New Zealand Volunteers and Retired list as a captain and major.

== Publications ==
- Peace Scouting for Girls (1910)
- The Dominion Scout (facsimile) monthly (1910–13)
- The Story of a Bull Pup: Official Handbook of the Junior Scouts of New Zealand (1917)
- Nga Toro Turehu: The Fairy Scout of New Zealand (1918)
- Guidelines for Empire Sentinels

== See also ==
- Military history of New Zealand
- Scouting New Zealand
- South African military decorations
