= Selina Cossgrove =

Selina Cossgrove (née Robertson, 1849 – 23 October 1929) was one of the early developers of the Girl Peace Scouts movement in New Zealand.

== Biography ==
Cossgrove was born in 1849, probably on 21 May, at Cairneyhill, Perthshire, Scotland. Her parents were William Robertson, a farmer, and his wife, Catherine Campbell. The family emigrated to New Zealand in 1860, settling in Sandfly Bay, Otago.

Cossgrove married David Cossgrove at Sandfly Bay on 11 February 1875. David Cossgrove had met Robert Baden-Powell while serving in South Africa and when Baden-Powell published his handbook for scouting, in 1908, he asked Baden-Powell for permission to establish scout groups in New Zealand. Baden-Powell agreed; David Cossgrove established 36 groups by the end of 1908 and in 1910 was appointed chief scout for the country.

Muriel Cossgrove, one of Selina and David's daughters, asked when there would be a group for girls to join. Her father requested and received permission from Baden-Powell, and Selina and David began to organise groups for girls. Cossgrove co-wrote Peace Scouting for Girls with her husband, which was published in 1910. She supported the development of the movement by arranging camps, addressing troops and attending rallies and church parades.

Selina Cossgrove died in Christchurch on 23 October 1929 and was buried beside her husband in Bromley Cemetery.

== Personal life ==
Cossgrove had eight children.
