= New Zealand Long and Efficient Service Medal =

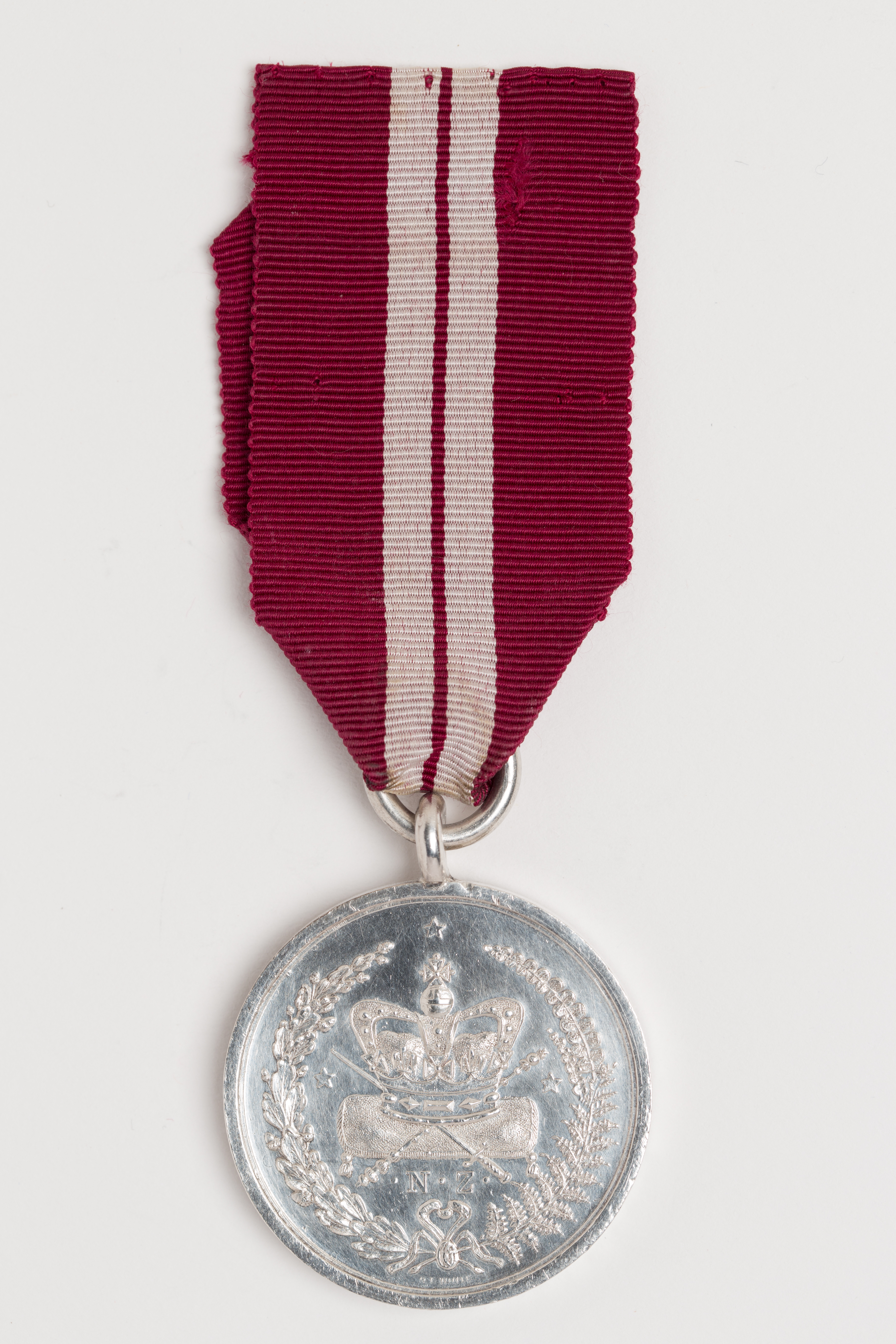
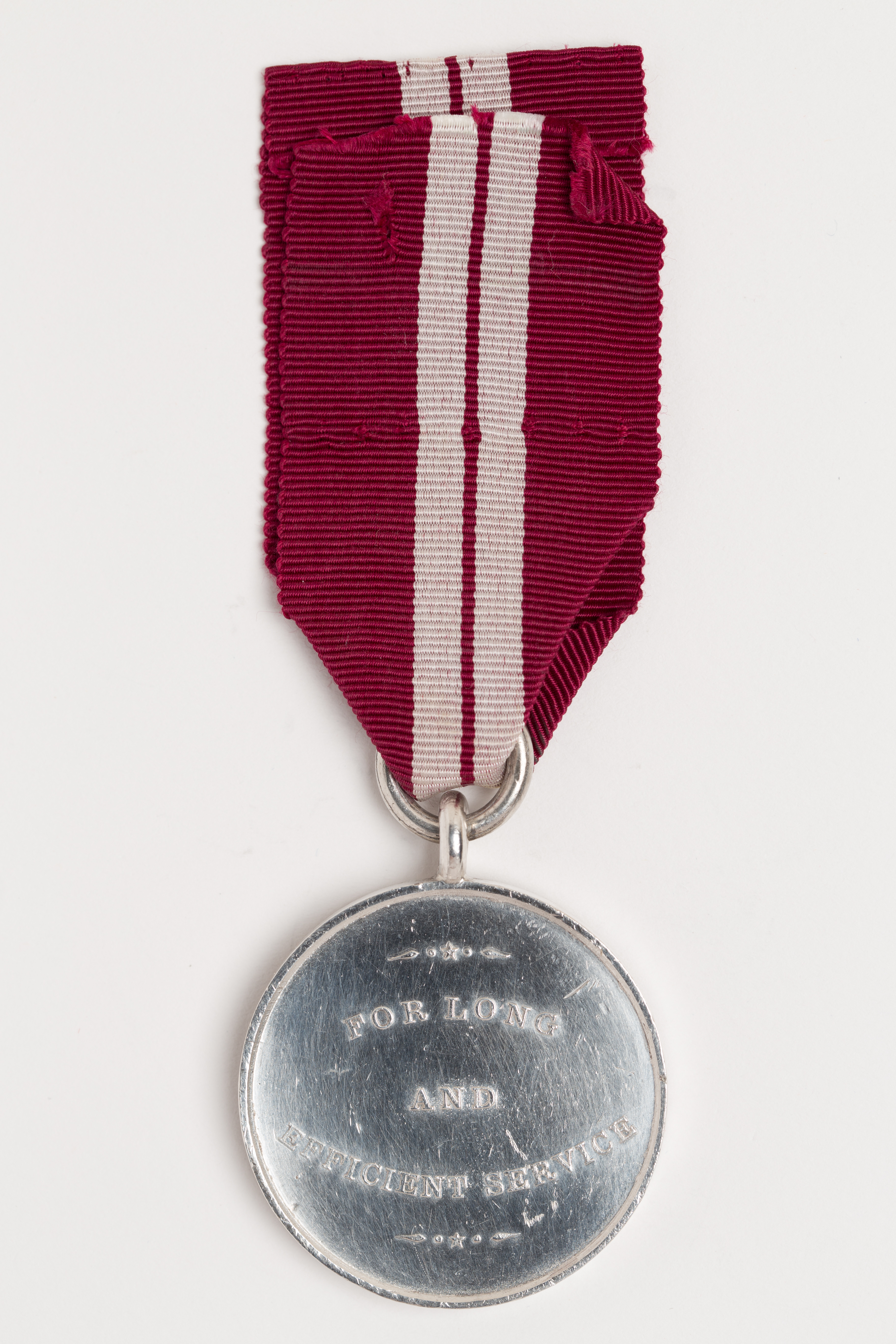
- Obverse and reverse of the medal
- Type: Long Service Award
- Awarded for: "Long and Efficient Service"
- Description: Silver disk, 37mm in diameter
- Presented by: New Zealand
- Eligibility: 1887–1891 non-commissioned officers and soldiers of the New Zealand Volunteers upon completion of 16 years continuous service 1891 the statutes of the award were amended to include Volunteer officers upon completion of 20 years broken service 1917 further amendment made to cover Territorial officers who were permanently appointed to the New Zealand Staff Corps or Permanent Staff; 1920 extended to all members of the New Zealand Military Forces.
- Clasps: none
- Status: Rendered obsolete 23 September 1931
- Established: 1 January 1887
- First award: to a member of the 1st Westland Rifle Volunteers and was recorded on 8 September 1887
- Final award: to Sgt Gordon Bremner, NZAOC on 12 May 1955

Highlights
- Total: 2384; 285 awarded to volunteers
- Ribbon of the medal

The New Zealand Long and Efficient Service Medal was the earliest medal awarded in New Zealand for long and efficient services, being issued between 1 January 1887 to 22 September 1931. Eligibility for the medal changed over time (see infobox) and, from 1920, could be issued to all members of the New Zealand Military Forces for 16 or 20 years of service (active service between 5 August 1914 and 28 January 1919 counted as double qualifying time).

== Description ==
The medal is round, 37 mm in diameter, and made of silver. The obverse of the medal depicts a Royal Crown superimposed over a crossed sword and Taiaha (Maori long club) and surrounded by fern fronds. The reverse bears the inscription FOR LONG AND EFFICIENT SERVICE. The medal's suspension is a 14 mm diameter ring, which passes through a loop fixed to the top of the piece. The ring will move forwards and backwards. The medal is suspended from a ribbon 38 mm wide, crimson in colour with two central white stripes, which were added in 1917.

== Varieties ==
There are three varieties:

- The first variety was manufactured by S. Kohn, Wellington, and marked S. KOHN between the ends of the ribbon bow.
- The second variety was manufactured by G.T. White, Christchurch and Wellington, and is found either unmarked, or marked with G.T. WHITE between the ends of the ribbon bow.
- The third variety was manufactured by William Dibble, Gerrards, London in the early 1950s. These medals were cast frosted silver second type medals, with very small suspension rings, sterling silver hallmarks and WJD on the bottom of the reverse. Intended primarily as replacement medals, most were sold to collectors with SPECIMEN impressed on the rim.

== See also ==
- Orders, decorations, and medals of New Zealand
- List of military decorations
- David Cossgrove
