= Student Scout and Guide Organisation =

Organisation

- Country: United Kingdom
- Founded: February 1967
- Membership: 959 (2022)
- Chair: Ewan Bell
- Website https://www.ssago.org

The Student Scout and Guide Organisation (SSAGO) is an association that provides support to individuals who are students at colleges and universities in the United Kingdom. It caters to Scouts, Guides, and those who have not been affiliated with a Scout or Guide Association. SSAGO is particularly focused on individuals interested in the aims, objectives, and methods of both The Scout Association and Girlguiding, UK.

Numerous universities host Scout and Guide Clubs affiliated with their respective Student Unions. Although, union affiliation is optional for a club to be part of SSAGO, many choose to do so. In cases where a university or college lacks a dedicated club, students have the option to become Individual or "Indie" members of SSAGO.

The activities of these clubs typically include organising weekend and evening events throughout the term, as well as longer events during university holidays. SSAGO sponsors a termly Rally, open to all Club and Indie members, organised by a different club each term. Additionally, an annual formal event known as a Ball is hosted.

The Oxford University Scout and Guide Group stands as the oldest known example of a Scout and Guide Club in the United Kingdom. Upon completing their university education, many SSAGO members opt to join the Scout and Guide Graduate Association (SAGGA).

== History ==
Informal Scout and Guide Clubs existed as early as 1915 when the first generation of Scouts grew out of the Scouting age yet wanted to keep some sense of fraternity. Some early organisations at colleges were known as Baden-Powell Guilds and Saint George Guilds. A world equivalent to this exists today in the International Scout and Guide Fellowship, or ISGF. Some of the first clubs were set up in university towns, such as Oxford, Cambridge, Manchester, and London. Inter-club activities were run intermittently until 1927. By 1920, Rover Scouts had been set up for people over 18 but many people were also part of Scout and Guide clubs. University clubs banded together to form an Inter-Varsity organisation while College-based clubs formed a similar setup. It was not until 1947 that inter-club meetings started again, and even then only for the Varsity clubs (those from universities, rather than colleges). Only two colleges (Loughborough and North Staffordshire) were admitted to Varsity. No other colleges were admitted, partially because of snobbery in the old red-brick establishments. The Federation of Scout and Guide Clubs in Training Colleges was set up in 1956 for colleges, and a year later it formed the Intercollegiate organisation. In 1967, the Intercollegiate and Inter-Varsity merged to form SSAGO due to the dwindling number of colleges as many became universities.

SSAGO was 40 in 2007, to celebrate this event a special emblem was designed and the Summer Rally was replaced with a Reunion Event held near Lincoln in July. While this event was run as a Rally there were some noticeable differences; there were fireworks on Friday night, all members old, and new, and SAGGA (who themselves are celebrating their 50th Anniversary) were invited to attend along with visits from prestigious guests such as Liz Burnley the current Chief Guide.

United Kingdom Scout and Guide Clubs and Rovers Crews were responsible for establishing an international Student Scout and Guide event called the Witan, named after the Anglo-Saxon gathering of the wise called a Witan. The first two such events were organised by the Oxford University Scout and Guide Group at Gilwell Park in 1959 and 1961.

== Rally ==
Rally is a national camp, held once every term where SSAGO clubs around the UK meet up to socialize and participate in a weekend of activities. The size of a rally can vary from around 100 to over 250 people. The three rallies are held each year in February, June, and November and, as they are hosted by different clubs each time, they offer an opportunity for participants to visit new places. The host club for each rally is chosen at the previous year's national SSAGO AGM.

Each rally has a theme chosen by the host club, which is incorporated into the rally through the different activities on offer across the weekend. Often, this includes experiences such as walks or hikes, on-site activities, visits to nearby attractions, or simply an afternoon off with which to explore. In addition, rallies can also include a ceilidh and themed fancy-dress competition.

Year	Event	Location	Host Club	Theme/Name	Dates	Attendance	Clubs Attended
2015	Lancaster Superhero Rally	Guys Farm Activity Centre, Lancaster	Lancaster	Superhero	February 6, 2015– February 8, 2015	197	24
2015	Bangor Disco Rally	Felin Bach, Bangor	Bangor	Disco	June 19, 2015– June 21, 2015	102	21
2015	Cardiff Carnival Rally	CRAI Activity Park, Cardiff	Cardiff	Carnival	November 20, 2015– November 22, 2015	240	26
2016	Feb-U-Rally	Woodhouse Park, Bristol	SAGUWE	Wallace and Gromit	February 12, 2016– February 14, 2016	213	28
2016	Southampton Dino Rally	Butchers Coppice, Bournemouth	Southampton	Dinosaur	June 17, 2016– June 19, 2016	171	30
2016	Space Rally	Rough Close Scout Campsite and Activity Centre, Coventry	Indie	Space	November 18, 2016– November 20, 2016	261	32
2017	Best of British Rally	Glenbrook Outdoor Activity Centre, Bamford	Sheffield	Best of British	February 17, 2017– February 19, 2017	243	31
2017	Leeds "Around the World" Rally	Bradley Wood Scout Campsite, Leeds	Leeds	Around the World	June 16, 2017– June 18, 2017	168	25
2017	Plymouth "90s" Rally	Sid Vale Scout Campsite, Devon	Plymouth	'90s	November 17, 2017– November 19, 2017	161	23
2018	Witan in a Weekend Rally	Scout Park, London	The Young Goats	Witan/Europe	February 16, 2018– February 18, 2018	320	38
2018	Cambridge Duck Rally	The Jarman Centre, Cambridge	CUSAGC	Duck	June 22, 2018– June 24, 2018	212	28
2018	Lancaster Fantasy Rally	Guys Farm Activity Centre, Lancaster	Lancaster SSAGO	Fantasy	November 16, 2018– November 18, 2018	243	29
2019	Nottingham Outlaw Rally	Walesby Forest, Nottingham	SNoGS	Robin Hood/Outlaws	February 15, 2019– February 17, 2019	271	35
2019	Scot Rally	Lapwing Lodge, Glasgow	Scotland	Scottish	June 28, 2019– June 30, 2019	120	30
2019	Birmingham Chocolate Rally	Alfrey Activity Centre Broadwater, Warwickshire	BUSAG	Chocolate	November 15, 2019– November 17, 2019	310	38
2020	Roman Rally MMXX	Briarlands Activity Centre, Bristol	Bath BUGS	Roman	February 21, 2020– February 23, 2020	294	39
2020	Survival Rally	Cranham Scout Centre, Gloucestershire*	UOBGAS and PLUGS (jointly)	Back-to-Basics	June 26, 2020– June 28, 2020 / September 11, 2020– September 13, 2020	N/A	N/A
2020	Build-A-Rally	Virtual Event*	Southampton	Construction	November 13, 2020– November 15, 2020	151	33
2021	Green Rally Yellow Rally	Virtual Event*	Millennial Millards (Members from several clubs)	Green and Yellow/ Milton Keynes	March 5, 2021– March 7, 2021	326	39
2021	Viking Rally	Moor House Adventure Centre, Durham	NUSSAGG and DUSAGG (jointly)	Viking	November 19, 2021– November 21, 2021	228	33
2022	Rally Of Games	Overstone Campsite, Northampton	Individual members from different groups	Boardgames	17 June 2022 - 19 June 2022	196	30
2022	Rali Cymru (Wales Rally)	CRAI Activity Centre, Newbridge	The South Welsh Clubs (SUGS, MSAGM Aber SSAGO, USW, SSAGS)	Wales	18 November 2022 - 20 November 2022	297	33
2023	CentenaRally	Tawd Vale Adventure Centre, Ormskirk	LUSSAGO	Centenary	3 March 2023 – 5 March 2023	235	26
2023	ReBuild-a-Rally	Braggers Wood Campsite and Activity Centre	Southampton SSAGO	Construction (The second attempt)	23 June 2023 – 26 June 2023	171	27
2023	Oktoberfest Rally	Blackwell Adventure, Bromsgrove	BUSAG	Oktoberfest/German Culture	24 November 2023 – 26 November 2023	262	30
2024	Rally Through Time	Snowball Plantation, York	SAGGY		8 March 2024 – 10 March 2024	220	27
2024	Sports Day Rally	Willesley Scout Campsite, Leicestershire	Aberystwyth SSAGO	School Sports Day	7 June 2024 – 9 June 2024	173	26
2024	Leeds of the Rings Rally	Bramhope Scout Campsite and Activity Centre, Leeds	LUUSAG	Lord of the Rings	22 November 2024- 24 November 2024	346	32
2025	Team Pink Rally	Tawd Vale Adventure Centre, Ormskirk	Serving and former members of Team Pink	Pink things/SSAGO	28 February 2025 – 2 March 2025	203	28
2025	Rally Front to Back	Sherbrooke Campsite, Nottinghamshire	SNoGS	Back to Front	20 June 2025 – 23 June 2025		
2025	Space Rally	West Hall Campsite	NUSSAGG	Space	21 November 2025 – 23 November 2025	249	26
2026	Port-A-Rally	Sandy Acres Guide Campsite, Shedfield	PUGS	Maritime	27th February 2026 - 1st March 2026		
2026	Rali Eryri	Tŷ Clwyd Guide Campsite, Llanfair Talhaiarn	Bangor BUGS	Snowdonia			
2026	SSAGO and the Quest for the Holy Grail		BUSAG/Keele	Arthurian legend/Monty Python			

- *Due to the impact of the COVID-19 pandemic, the summer 2020 rally (Survival Rally, organised by Plymouth SSAGO) had to be postponed, and later cancelled. Build-A-Rally and Green Rally Yellow Rally were run as virtual events.

== Ball ==
In addition to the three rallies, there is also an annual ball hosted every year by a chosen SSAGO club. The ball provides an alternative to the camping and outdoors often associated with Scouting and Guiding by offering a formal meal, dancing, and another chance to socialize with other SSAGO members.

Typically balls will be themed, with accommodation available nearby, varying from hotels to scout huts depending on the participants' budget. Balls offer a packed evening program, giving everyone a chance to make new friends, catch up with old ones and have a great night outside of the campsite. Often, the ball will include activities nearby to help participants make a weekend of the event.

Year	Event	Location	Host Club	Theme/Name	Dates	Attendance	Clubs Attended
2015	Southampton Ball on a Boat	MV Ocean Scene, Southampton	Southampton	Nautical	21 March 2015	128	18
2016	Leeds Northern Lights Ball	Marriott Hotel, Leeds	Leeds	Northern Lights	March 19, 2016	146	23
2017	Bath Masked Ball	Guildhall, Bath	Bath	Masquerade	April 1, 2017	178	22
2018	Yule Ball Ball	The Bristol Hotel, Bristol	SAGUWE	Harry Potter	April 7, 2018	169	27
2019	Aber does ABBA Ball	Marine Hotel, Aberystwyth	Aberystwyth SSAGO	ABBA	April 13, 2019	135	28
2020 (2021)	City of Steel Ball	Kelham Island Museum	Sheffield StinGS	Sheffield	April 4, 2020 /February 6, 2021	N/A*	N/A*
2021	WomBall	Rough Close Campsite, Coventry	BUSAG	Recycling	11 September 2021**	87	25
2022	Once Upon a Ball	Keele Hall, Staffordshire	Various Members	Fairytale	30 April 2022	194	25
2023	MedieBall	County Assembly Rooms, Lincoln	LUGS	Mediӕval	29th April 2023	112	24
2024	Aber Birthday ball	Y Consti, Aberystwyth	Aberystwyth SSAGO	AberSSAGO's 20th Birthday	27 April 2024	128	20
2025	Goose Ball	Colwick Hall, Nottingham	SNoGS	Nottingham Goose Fair	12 April 2025		
2026	Murder Mystery Ball		BUSAG	Murder mystery			

- *Due to the COVID-19 pandemic, City of Steel Ball was postponed from April 2020 to February 2021, with a virtual event being held on the original date, however due to the continued restrictions on social contact within the UK the physical event was ultimately cancelled.
    - Due to the COVID-19 pandemic, WomBall was postponed from April 2021 to September 2021, with a change from the traditional ball format to a "festival style" event with games and activities on a campsite for an afternoon.

== Existing clubs ==
There are currently more than thirty universities with a SSAGO club. There are also at least ten that no longer exist. The Universities with a functioning SSAGO club are:

- Aberystwyth Student Scout and Guide Organisation (MSAGM Aber SSAGO)
- Bangor University Guides and Scouts (Bangor BUGS)
- Bath University Guides and Scouts (Bath BUGS)
- Birmingham Universities Scouts and Guides (BUSAG) – Also open to students from Aston University, Birmingham City University and University College Birmingham
- Cambridge University Scout and Guide Club (CUSAGC) – Including Anglia Ruskin University
- Durham University Scout and Guide Group (DUSAGG)
- Edge Hill SSAGO (EHUSSAGO)
- Exeter SSAGO (EUSSAGO)
- Glasgow SSAGO (GLASSGO)
- Keele SSAGO
- Kent SSAGO (KUSAG)
- Kernow SSAGO (SSAGOK) – University of Exeter and Falmouth University
- Lancaster SSAGO (LSSAGO)
- Leeds University Union Scout and Guide Society (LUUSAG)
- Leicester Students of Leicester Universities Guides & Scouts (SLUGS)
- Lincoln University Guides and Scouts (LUGS)
- Liverpool University SSAGO (LUSSAGO)
- Loughborough Students Union Scout and Guide Club (SCOGUI) – The name comes from the words SCOut and GUIde rather than an acronym of the club's full name
- Manchester SSAGO (ManSSAGO)
- Newcastle Universities Student Scout and Guide Group (NUSSAGG) – Membership is open to those studying at Newcastle University, Northumbria University and Newcastle College
- Nottingham and Nottingham Trent SSAGO – Society of Nottingham Guides and Scouts (SNoGS)
- Oxford University Scout and Guide Group (OUSGG)
- Plymouth University Guides and Scouts (PLUGS)
- Portsmouth University Guides and Scouts (PUGS)
- Royal Holloway SSAGO (RHULSSAGO)
- Salford SSAGO (SALSAGO)
- Scouts and Girl Guides York (SAGGY)
- Sheffield (StinGS)
- Southampton SSAGO
- Swansea University Guides and Scouts (SUGS)
- UEA SSAGO (EGGS)
- University of Bristol Guides and Scouts (UOBGAS)
- University of West of England Club of Guides and Scouts (UWE CoGS)
- Warwick Guides and Scouts (WUGS)
- Winchester University SSAGO
- Worcester University SSAGO (WUSAG)
- York St John University SSAGO (Saint SSAGO)

In addition to the clubs listed above, there are independent, or "Indie" members, who are often either students who are at a university without a club or those who have recently graduated and left university.
