= Oxford University Scout and Guide Group =

- Headquarters: Oxford
- Country: United Kingdom
- Affiliation: Student Scout and Guide Organisation
- Website ousgg.org.uk

The Oxford University Scout and Guide Group (OUSGG) is the oldest student Scout and Guide club in the United Kingdom, having been founded in 1919. When Rover Scouts were part of Scouting in the UK, the Group included a Rover Crew, the 13th Oxford. The stated aim of the group is to enable members of the University of Oxford to “maintain, acquire, or renew an interest in the Scout and Guide Movements”.

== History ==
The group was founded in 1919 under the name of "O.U.B.P. Scout Club", with the first formal meeting held on 24 November that year. Women were first admitted to OUSGG the following year. For a number of years, the Club ran in parallel with Oxford University Rover Crew and Oxford University Girl Guide Club, until 1939, when these merged into the Scout group. In 1940 the O.U. Guide Club was reformed, though it turned out it had never officially disbanded.

Missing records make the exact tracking of various mergers and separations between the Rover, Scout, and Guide groups difficult, but the name Oxford University Scout and Guide Group was officially accepted when the group constitution was rewritten in 1962.

For 50 years the Group camped in the Easter vacation, and the late summer vacation, at the Ennerdale Scout Camp of the Cumbria Scout Country.

The Group was responsible for organising the first two international Scout and Guide camps at Gilwell Park in 1959 and 1961. These events are called Witans, named after the Anglo-Saxon gathering of the wise called a Witan.

== Membership ==
Its membership mainly comprises members of the University of Oxford; however, within certain limits other people may join. It is affiliated to the Student Scout and Guide Organisation (SSAGO). During the University's term the group meets on Monday nights, with a lunchtime meeting (‘NnN’) held on Thursdays. During University vacations the group goes on trips, the most notable being “Winter Walking” held over the New Year.

== Publication ==
PostScript is the thrice-termly publication of the Group. It is not only a newsletter informing members, ex-members and old members of upcoming events and activities, but also serves as a permanent record of the group's history. A copy of each new issue is stored in the Bodleian Library at the University of Oxford.

== See also ==
- Student Scout and Guide Organisation
- Delftsche Zwervers probably the oldest student Scout group in the world
