= Scout and Guide Graduate Association =

Organization in the United Kingdom

The Scout and Guide Graduate Association (SAGGA) is an association in the United Kingdom of Scouts and Guides who, largely, were former members of University or College Scout and Guide Clubs, or University Rover Scout crews. It exists to provide skilled service to Scouting and Guiding. SAGGA's membership mainly resides in the UK, with some members overseas.

== History ==
SAGGA was formed on 21 April 1957, and was originally nicknamed the "Peter Pan Club". The association was an affiliated organisation of both Girlguiding UK and the Scout Association, but in 1988 it was de-affiliated by both associations.

SAGGA celebrated their 50th anniversary in 2007, with special celebrations at the association's Annual Gathering and AGM.

In 2014 SAGGA became a Scout Active Support Unit therefore re-affiliating with the Scout Association. It continues to work closely with Girlguiding UK

== Organisation ==
SAGGA as an organisation views itself as a framework within which its members can organise activities for the benefit of themselves or the movement. This framework lets them choose what to do: building up skills and experiences, trying something new, joining activities such as camping, winter walking, sailing and crafts.

While most members are graduates and members or former members of the Associations, these are not conditions of joining. Their only criteria for membership are sympathy with their aims, and undertaking a CRB check.

== Aims ==
SAGGA's aims are:

- To provide service to the Scout and Guide Movement
- To enable its members to use their skills in giving service
- To promote Scout and Guide co-operation
- To promote discussion and development of ideas relevant to Scouting and Guiding
- To maintain communication between SAGGA and other related organisations
- To encourage equal opportunities in the Movement
- To encourage members and their families to be involved in Scouting and Guiding Activities

== Major activities ==
SAGGA Members working on a Scout Campsite in Sweden in 2006

In the 1960s it was particularly active in pressing for co-educational Scouting and Guiding. To promote this it organised many events, particularly SAGA '61, the first joint Scout and Guide camp, and then SAGA '65, which was a joint Scout and Guide activity in Norway.

Members were also involved in introducing modern youth work methods into Scout and Guide Leader Training, such as Wood Badge training courses.

SAGGA decided to revisit its roots with the GaSCiT events of 2000 and 2003, and while they brought together members of both halves of the Scout and Guide Movement, the aim this time was to support and train leaders lacking in the skills needed to organise their own camps.

In summer 2007 SAGGA supported the 21st World Scout Jamboree by running 1 in 10 of the community projects referred to on the Jamboree programme as "Starburst".

In years when there is no special project SAGGA usually runs a week-long camp using its members' skills to improve facilities at a Scout or Guide camp site.

SAGGA continues to run major projects to support the Scout and Guide movement.
