= GirlGuiding New Zealand =

- Māori: Ngā Kōhine Whakamahiri o Aotearoa
- Headquarters: Christchurch
- Country: New Zealand
- Founded: 1908
- Founder: David Cossgrove
- Membership: 10,000
- National Board Chair: Maia Faulkner
- Affiliation: World Association of Girl Guides and Girl Scouts
- Website http://www.girlguidingnz.org.nz

GirlGuiding New Zealand (in Māori Ngā Kōhine Whakamahiri o Aotearoa) is the national Guiding organisation in New Zealand. GirlGuiding New Zealand currently splits New Zealand into 10 regions around the country with approximately 10,000 members (as of the beginning of 2016).

The organisation is known for its biscuits.

There are three main principles to Guiding, remembered by the trefoil and the three fingered salute. These are: To be true to yourself and develop your beliefs, to live by the Guide Law, and to take action for a better world.

All girls, regardless of race, faith or other circumstances, may become enrolled members of GirlGuiding New Zealand as long as they are able to understand, and are willing to make the promise. Pippins do not make the promise.

== History ==
Lieutenant Colonel Cossgrove served in the Second Boer War with Robert Baden-Powell, founder of the Scout and Guide movement. Following Baden-Powell's ideas Cossgrove established Boy Scout troops in New Zealand in 1908. His daughter Muriel wanted an organisation for girls so, after correspondence with Baden-Powell, Cossgrove started the Girl Peace Scouts and, on Baden-Powell's suggestion, wrote the programme in the book Peace Scouting for Girls, which was published in 1910. By the time the book was published, there were over 300 girls already practising Peace Scouting in Christchurch (Cossgrove's home), Dunedin and Auckland, creating confusion about the starting year. Letters from Muriel in 1908 discussing Peace Scouts with a friend have been found and this is generally the accepted date for the origin of the New Zealand Guide movement. The Peace Scouts became an incorporated society in 1919 and Cossgrove was the head until his death in 1920. Leadership was then continued by his wife and son. The organisation became officially affiliated with the UK branch of Guiding (now Girlguiding UK) in 1912 and, in 1923, the organisation changed its name and programme to Guides New Zealand and was a founding member of the World Association of Girl Guides and Girl Scouts in 1928.

From 1923 to 1968 the promise read:

On my honour I promise that I will do my best
To do my duty to God and the King/Queen
To help other people at all times
To obey the Guide Law

From 1923 to 1973 there were 10 laws and the motto was Be Prepared.

In 2007, this organisation changed its name from Guides New Zealand to GirlGuiding New Zealand.

=== Girl Peace Scouts ===
The Girl Peace Scouts existed until amalgamation with the Girl Guides in 1923. The name, Girl Peace Scouts, applied to girls between 12 and 20. Any girls who could afford the uniform were expected to wear a khaki blouse and skirt (coming below the knee), a leather belt around the waist with a knife plus a khaki hat with a brim. Good Turns were an important part of Peace Scouts. Girls always wore three pieces of ribbon tied in bows with the ends knotted to remind themselves to do good turns. The crest was in the shape of a fleur-de-lis with the motto, Be always ready, inscribed below.

The oath was carried out with a girl's left hand on her heart and the right in the standard three fingered salute while repeating:

On my honour I promise that
I will be loyal to God and the King,
I will try to help others at all times
I know the Scout Law and will obey it

At the time there were 9 Scout laws.

In 2014 the Guide Promise changed to

I promise to do my best,
To be true to myself and develop my beliefs,
To live by the Guide Law
And take action for a better world.

==== Fairy Peace Scouts ====
Fairy Peace Scouts were established for the younger sisters (aged from 7) of Peace Scouts in 1918. The programme was based on Māori legends and the UK Brownie/Rosebud programme. The leader was called the 'Fairy Mistress' and waved a wand. The motto was Be true. The uniform was a white dress and a Peter Pan hat. Before being enrolled, girls had to prove they could lace their boots, tell the time and skip on both feet. They then had to repeat the fourfold promise and the six laws:

1. I must always speak the truth
2. I must make myself useful to others
3. I must be gentle and kind to everyone
4. I must not make money for doing a good turn
5. I must always smile and look pleasant
6. (missing)

== Sections of GirlGuiding New Zealand ==
=== Pippins ===
Pippins are girls aged 5 and 6. At Pippins, girls develop awareness of the world around them. They learn important new things about themselves, other people, and the environment. The programme encourages Pippins learn to share and work together as they take on new challenges from baking to kite making. Pippins work towards the Gold Apple Award.

=== Brownies ===
Brownies are girls between ages 7½ and 9. At Brownies, girls are finding their passions and learning more independence by starting to take charge of what they do. Some badges require girls to work together while others let girls explore their personal interests - from science and technology to creative arts and conservation. Brownies work towards the Gold Koru Award.

=== Guides ===
Guides are girls between ages 9 and 12½. The Guides programme includes learning leadership skills in Patrols and taking on new challenges in the outdoors. They are exploring their passions and start learning how to take action in their world. Some activities include: learn to read maps, build and sleep in a bivouac, geocaching, performing arts, science, weather, astronomy, community action, cooking outdoors, and more. Guides form a 'horseshoe' shape for their ceremonies. Guides work towards the Aoraki Award.

=== Rangers ===
Rangers are girls between ages 12 and 17. Rangers are expanding their worldview and participating in their community. Unlike the younger sections, Rangers are not divided into Patrols. All girls work together to plan their weekly programme and camps, with support and guidance from the unit leaders. The programme includes learning new skills, exploring new ideas, undertaking advocacy and community service projects, and holding a leadership role. Rangers can become a Ranger in Leadership (RIL, colloquially) as a 'girl leader' at a Pippin, Brownie, or Guide unit, under the supervision of the leader. They were originally termed ‘Junior Leaders’ but this was changed in 1995. Rangers form a ‘V’ shape for ceremonies. This symbolises being open to the world, offering service and friendship to all. Rangers work towards the Queen's Guide Award, the highest achievement in GirlGuiding.

A cartoon human girl named Woozle was the Rangers' Mascot and was introduced in 1984. The original Woozle went to help in Third World countries in 1995 and was replaced by a new species: Macwoozlefum zealandii. Some units still use the mascots today.

=== Aotearoa Units ===
The Lone Peace Scouts originally started in 1923. The first member was Miss Nancy Borton of O Kaiawa, Hampden, Otago. In 1926, the Lones were split into two sections, the Post Guides for girls who were physically handicapped and were at home or in hospital (see below) and the Lone Branch for girls who live too far away. In 1934, the first Ranger and Brownie Lones were established. In 1929 the motto was established as: Solae Sed Sodales translating to: Lones but of a sisterhood

At the beginning of 2013 the "Lones" were renamed to the Aotearoa Team. The Aotearoa Team is a nationwide region which is made up of units who deliver GirlGuiding in a different way. Girls don't attend regular unit meetings at a venue, instead they do their girl programme in other ways. These units may use a variety of methods to deliver programmes – including posting resources in the mail, sending emails, programmes on the internet, texting and other social media. The unit leaders discuss with families the best ways to deliver the programme for their circumstances. In 2020, GirlGuiding New Zealand launched Explore. Explore is a digital platform to deliver the Pippin, Brownie, and Guide programmes on a flexible, digital platform.

=== Connect ===
Connect is for young women aged 16–35. Members of Connect can choose from a range of opportunities, including international experiences, volunteering within GirlGuiding New Zealand as a mentor or leader, learning new skills, staying in touch, and working towards qualifications.

The three options are: Network (an alumnae group for 16–35 year-olds), Stay Connected (a self-directed programme for 16–25 year olds to challenge themselves), and Expanded Horizons (a programme for young leaders aged 16–25).

=== Red Shield Guides ===
These units (Pippins to Rangers) were affiliated to the Salvation Army. All practices are the same as regular Guiding units except the promise has the following added:

I promise not to drink alcoholic beverages, smoke or take harmful drugs, and to keep myself clean in thought and deed.

=== Other units ===
Multi-age

When there are too few girls for separate units, they are amalgamated into one unit. This unit will carry out activities adapted to suit all ages and still be relevant to the different sections.

Joint Guide/Scout

This is seen as a temporary measure only when there are too few leaders and/or children. Boys cannot become enrolled as Guides.

== National Guiding Centres ==
=== Otimai ===
Otimai is the first Guiding centre in New Zealand, donated as a training house by Mr and Mrs Wilson (the Chief Commissioner of the time) in 1927. Situated only 30 minutes from Auckland city centre, in Waitakere, it is controlled by the Auckland Region. The motto is: faith, love and service. When first given, there was no electricity, running water or sewage system to the house but working bees and help from the community improved and extended the place with an official opening on 27 April 1928. ‘’Little Otimai’’ is a small cottage on the grounds, used for patrol leader trainings and Rangers. A ‘luncheon party’ was held for Robert and Olave Baden Powell on Thinking Day 1931 as part of their tour of the country. There is a chapel hidden in the woods of the grounds styled on a similar one at Foxlease in the UK.

=== Trefoil Park ===
Trefoil Park is a section of land in a rural valley between Whangarei and Kaikohe was given to the Guide Association by an anonymous family in 1980. Much fundraising was carried out in the first couple of years to level the ground and build suitable accommodation on site. Gala day and concerts were held, plus the production of “Trefoil Treats”, a recipe book, sold 6,000 copies. 1982 saw many working bees to get the camp functioning and the ‘Camp of the Marsden Cross’ was held in January 1984 to open Trefoil Park. 200 Guides, 36 leaders and 20 Rangers attended the event which was opened by Joye Evans, Chief Commissioner of the time. The chapel at Trefoil Park is dedicated to Shirley Crawford (née Pearson) for her work in Guiding – 25 February 1995.

=== Arahina Girl Guide Training Centre ===
Arahina, meaning ‘to have been led’ in Māori, was a national conference and training centre in Marton. Girl Guiding New Zealand bought the property in 1946 and it was well used for national leader trainings, conferences and meetings. In 2000, it was sold to the Institute in Basic Life Principles.

=== Cracroft Guiding Centre ===
Cracroft House was located in the Christchurch suburb of Cashmere. It was built in the 1860s and was given to the Guide Association in 1959 by Mr and Mrs Cracroft Wilson. It was used for Guiding events and holidays and was extended in the 1990s with the addition of the Edna Hanafin Room and a modern ablutions block.

The house was severely damaged in the 2011 Christchurch earthquake and was demolished in 2012, although the Edna Hanafin Room was retained. This room continues to be used as a meeting room.

The Barn (located behind Cracroft House) was built as an accommodation facility, with a large hall, kitchens and bathrooms. It is currently serving as the National Headquarters, as the National Offices in Armagh Street were also damaged in the earthquake.

=== Kaitoke Lodge ===
Kaitoke Lodge was donated to Wellington Province for camps from Mr and Mrs John Hoggard in 1962.

== See also ==
- Mona Burgin
- Scouting New Zealand
- David Cossgrove
- Eileen Louise Soper
- Lizzie Marvelly
