= Crosshill, South Ayrshire =

Coordinates: 55.325°N 4.639°W

Crosshill
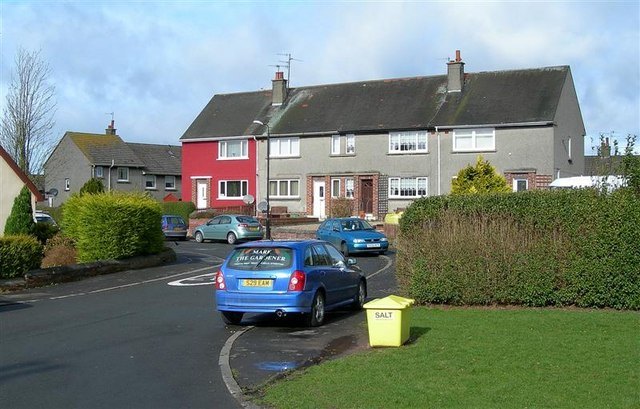
- Carrick Drive, Crosshill

- Location within South Ayrshire
- OS grid reference: NS328064
- Council area: South Ayrshire
- Lieutenancy area: Ayrshire and Arran
- Country: Scotland
- Sovereign state: United Kingdom
- Post town: MAYBOLE
- Postcode district: KA19
- Police: Scotland
- Fire: Scottish
- Ambulance: Scottish
- UK Parliament: Ayr, Carrick and Cumnock
- Scottish Parliament: Carrick, Cumnock and Doon Valley

Crosshill is a small village in South Ayrshire, Scotland. It lies on the left bank of the Water of Girvan and 2.8 miles (4.5 km) southeast of the town of Maybole on the B7023 road.

Crosshill has a primary school.

== History ==
According to Historic Environment Scotland, "Crosshill was planned in the early 19th century as a weaver's village with many of the weavers coming from Ireland to work and is described in the Buildings of Scotland, (2012) as being the least altered example of a weavers' village in Ayrshire", especially in reference to the cottages that line Dalhowan Street.

Crosshill railway station (Ayrshire) served the village from 1860 to 1862 on the Maybole and Girvan Railway.
