= Scouts Aotearoa =

National Scouting association in New Zealand

The Scout Association of New Zealand
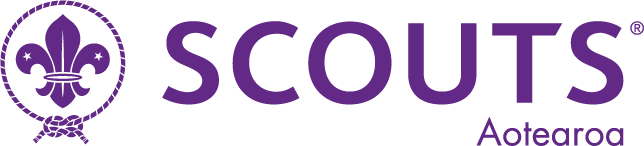
- Headquarters: Level 1, 1 Kaiwharawhara Road, Wellington, 6035
- Country: New Zealand
- Founded: 1923 incorporated 1941
- Founder: The Boy Scouts Association (of the United Kingdom)
- Membership: 18219
- Affiliation: World Organization of the Scout Movement
- Website scouts.nz

Scouts Aotearoa, known internationally as Scouts Aotearoa New Zealand (Note: "Aotearoa" is not a well known term outside of New Zealand.) is a trading name of The Scout Association of New Zealand, the national Scouting association in New Zealand and an affiliate of the World Organization of the Scout Movement (WOSM) since 1953. Scouts Aotearoa had 12,156 youth members and with 5,888 volunteers as of the end of 2020.

The association actively participates in many Asia-Pacific Region and World Scout camps and Jamborees.

== History ==
Membership emblem until 2008

For the history of Scouting in New Zealand generally, from 1908 see Scouting in New Zealand. In 1923, The Boy Scouts Association of the United Kingdom formed a branch in New Zealand and set about re-organising scouting according to its Policy, Organisation and Rules and establishing its Wolf Cubs and Rover programs. The Boy Scouts Association's New Zealand branch was incorporated in 1941 as The Boy Scouts Association (New Zealand Branch), Incorporated which changed its name to The Boy Scouts Association of New Zealand in 1956 and then to The Scout Association of New Zealand in 1967.

Until 1953 the New Zealand branch was represented internationally through The Boy Scouts Association of the United Kingdom. In 1953, the New Zealand branch became a direct member of the World Organization of the Scout Movement. In 1963, the Venturer Scout section was introduced. In 1976, the first females became members of the Venturer section, on a trial basis. In 1979, females were formally admitted and the Venturer section became co-ed. In 1987, girls were formally admitted into the Scout section. This was followed by girls being admitted into the Kea and Cub programs in 1989.

In 1979, Arthur W.V. Reeve was awarded the Bronze Wolf, the only distinction of the World Organization of the Scout Movement, awarded by the World Scout Committee for exceptional services to world Scouting. The Scout Law was rewritten, and reduced to three key tenets in 2015: An official Māori language translation was also created.

== Events ==
The first New Zealand Jamboree, the New Zealand Exhibition Jamboree was held in Dunedin in the years 1925–6. An estimated 200 people attended. The next was held in Auckland in 1958–9. Since then they have been held every three years. The 20th New Zealand Jamboree was held from 2013 to 2014 in Feilding, and the 21st New Zealand Jamboree was held at Renwick Sports Ground, Marlborough, from 29 December 2016 to 7 January 2017.

Ventures are held every three years and attended by youth in the Venturer section. Venture is split into two parts – phase one (off site expeditions) and phase two (onsite activities). The 15th New Zealand Venture was held in Mayfield, Canterbury from 29 December 2022 to 8 January 2023

As of 2023, there have been 80 National Rover Moots in New Zealand. Moots are normally held locally and nationally once a year which are organised and run by Rovers. The 80th National Rover Moot (Wild Moot) was held at Kumara Racecourse, Kumara, West Coast over Easter weekend 2023.

== Sections ==
Youth members follow programmes, in sections divided by age-ranges:

- Kea - 5-8
- Cubs - 8-11
- Scouts - 11-14
- Venturers - 14-18
- Rovers - 18-26

== Cook Islands Boy Scout Association ==
The Cook Islands Boy Scout Association comes under the administration of Scouting New Zealand, continuing the arrangement from before the Cook Islands became a self-governing dependency of New Zealand, as does Scouting in Niue and Scouting in Tokelau.

== Scouting and Guiding on Niue ==
The emblem of Scouting on Niue features a palm tree.

Scouting and Guiding on Niue comes under the administration of Scouting New Zealand, continuing the arrangement from before Niue became a self-governing dependency of New Zealand.

== Scouting and Guiding on Tokelau ==
Scouting in Tokelau comes under the administration of Scouting New Zealand, continuing the arrangement from before the Tokelau became a self-governing dependency of New Zealand.

The emblem of Scouting in Tokelau features a palm tree.

== See also ==
- Scouting in New Zealand
- Sea Scouts New Zealand
- Air Scout
- GirlGuiding New Zealand
