= Scouting =

Youth movement

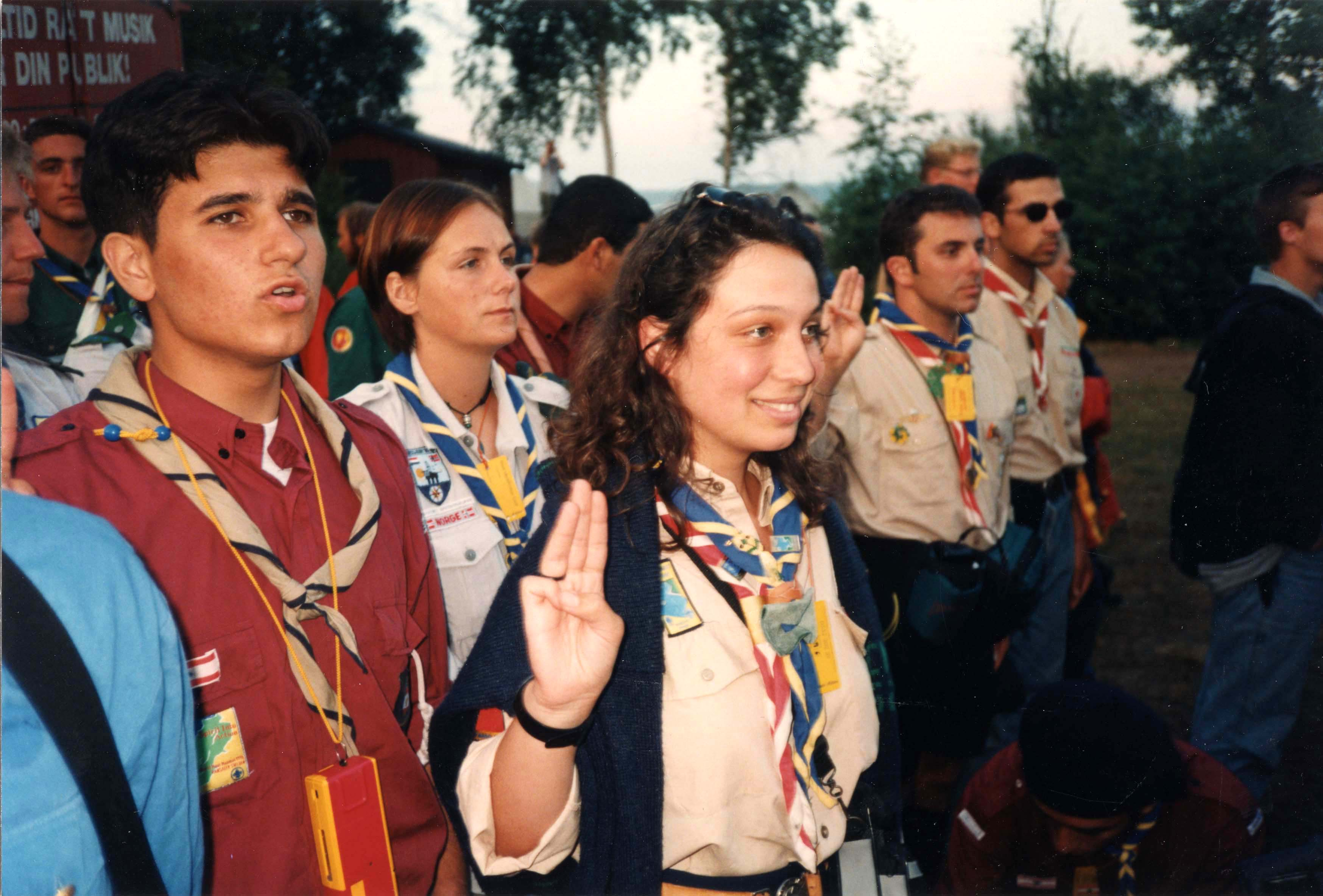
- Scouts and Guides from several different countries meet at a World Scout Moot in Sweden, 1996
- Founded: 1907
- Founder: Robert Baden-Powell

Scouting or the Scout Movement is a youth movement which became popularly established in the first decade of the 20th century.

It follows the Scout method of informal education with an emphasis on practical outdoor activities, including camping, woodcraft, aquatics, hiking, backpacking, and sports. A widely recognized movement characteristic is the Scout uniform, by intent hiding all differences of social standing and encouraging equality, with neckerchief (known as a scarf in some countries) and (originally) a campaign hat or comparable headwear. Distinctive insignia include the fleur-de-lis, as well as merit badges or patches. In many countries, girls-only organizations, whose members are often called Guides instead of Scouts, use a trefoil insignia instead of the fleur-de-lis.

The original program was for youths between the ages of 11 and 17. Other programs for youths who are too young to be in the main program and take the Scout Promise sometimes exist within an organization. Early examples are Wolf Cubs and Brownies. Programs can also exist for those who are older. Early examples are Rovers or Rangers. The actual names or even existence depend on organization and time period. Speciality programs, such as Sea Scouts, exist.

In 2019, over 55 million Scouts and Guides were in at least 155 countries. The Scout movement is a pluralist movement, not a unitary organization. Numerous local, national, and international Scout organizations have been formed. The largest international organizations are the World Organization of the Scout Movement and the World Association of Girl Guides and Girl Scouts; some national organizations belong to both.

== History ==
=== Origins ===
In the late 19th and beginning of the 20th century, popular interest in frontier and military scouts existed. Boys and girls read fictional and nonfictional stories about scouts and emulated these scouts in dress and activities and used self-help manuals. Some teachers and youth leaders instructed boys and girls in scout craft. Reconnaissance and Scouting (1884) and Aids to Scouting, books on military scout training written by Robert Baden-Powell, were among the sources used for instruction. Sales of Aids to Scouting were fueled by Baden-Powell's fame as hero of the Second Boer War.

Inspired by the interest in his books on scout training and urged by the Boys' Brigade founder, William A. Smith and leaders, some of whom had adopted Scout training, and by the publishers, C. Arthur Pearson Ltd, Baden-Powell began writing a book for boy readership. Baden-Powell was also motivated by his experience with the Mafeking Cadet Corps and the poor physical standards of recruits and their poor preparation for colonial wars. He studied other youth training schemes. In July 1906, Ernest Thompson Seton, a British-born Canadian-raised naturalist, artist and writer living in the United States, sent Baden-Powell a copy of his 1902 book The Birchbark Roll of the Woodcraft Indians and they met in October 1906 and shared ideas about youth training, providing Baden-Powell with a scheme for delivery of scout training.

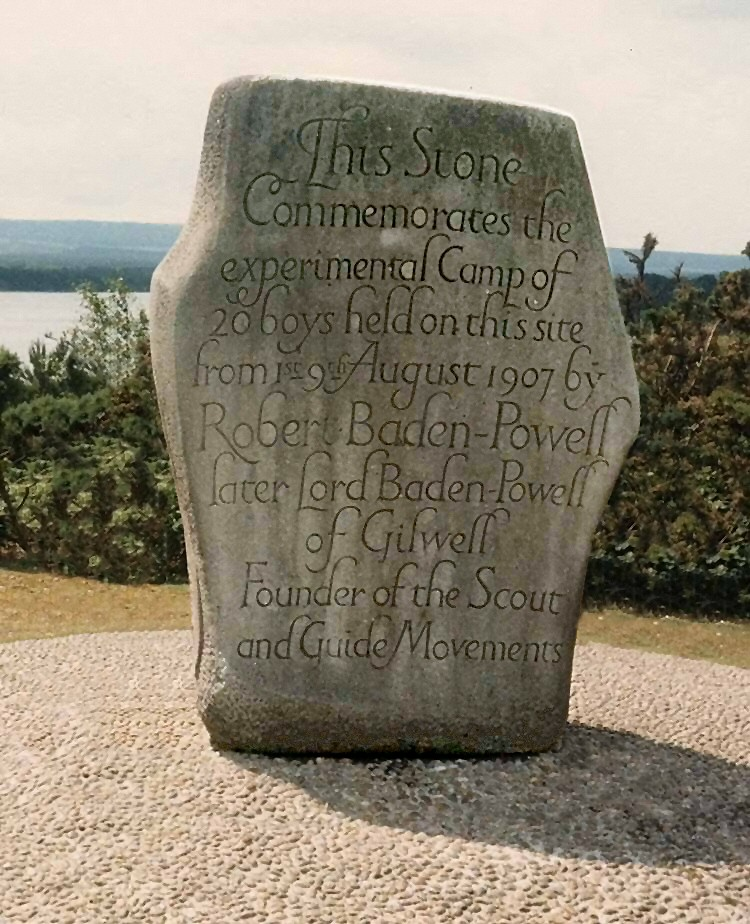
Stone on Brownsea Island commemorating the first experimental Scout camp

In August 1907, Baden-Powell led a week-long experimental Scout camp on Brownsea Island in Poole Harbour, Dorset England to test his ideas. Twenty-one boys from various social backgrounds, from boy's schools in the London area and a section of boys from the Poole, Parkstone, Hamworthy, Bournemouth and Winton Boys' Brigade units attended the camp. Following Seton's scheme, the boys organized themselves in small groups with an elected leader. The camp was accompanied by advertising and followed by an extensive promotional speaking tour arranged by C. Arthur Pearson Ltd. to promote the forthcoming book.

In 1908, Baden-Powell's book, Scouting for Boys, was published in six fortnightly parts, followed in April by The Scout magazine. These omitted many military aspects of Aids to Scouting and transferred the techniques (mainly survival skills) to non-military heroes: backwoodsmen, explorers. He also added innovative educational principles (the Scout method) by which he extended the attractive game to a personal mental education and provided descriptions of the Scout method of outdoor activities aiming at developing character, citizenship training and Physical fitness among youth. Later in 1908, Scouting for Boys was published in book form and a revised edition was published in 1909 and was the basis for the 1910 Boy Scout Handbook of the Boy Scouts of America by Seton. The various editions of the book are now the fourth-bestselling title of all time. The original edition and magazine described a scheme which could be used by established organizations, particular the various Brigade Movement organizations. However, because of the popular image of scouts and desire for adventurous outdoor activities, boys and even some girls formed their own Scout patrols and troops, independent of any organization.

In 1909, a Scout Rally was held at Crystal Palace in London, which 11,000 Boy Scouts and even some Girl Scouts in uniform attended.

Local and national Scout organizations were formed. In 1910, Baden-Powell formed The Boy Scouts Association. The Boy Scouts Association's first census in 1910 claimed 100,000 registered Scouts.

Special interests and programs developed such as Scout bands, cyclist scouts, Sea Scouts, Air Scouts, mounted Scouts and high adventure.

=== Girl Guides ===
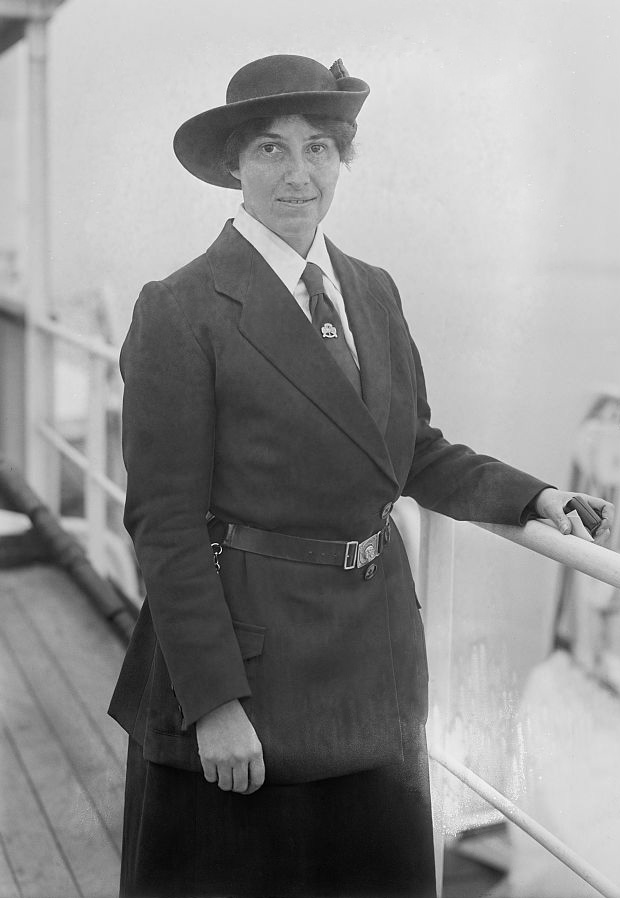
Olave Baden-Powell, Girl Guide's second head

Many girls took up being Girl Scouts and were part of the Scout Movement as soon as it began. Common Edwardian values of the time would not accept young boys and girls to "rough and tumble" together. Baden-Powell with the help of his sister, Agnes Baden-Powell, formed a separate organization for girls in 1910, the Girl Guides Association, which was followed in other countries forming the Girl Guides. However, by the 1990s, two-thirds of the Scout organizations belonging to WOSM had become co-educational.

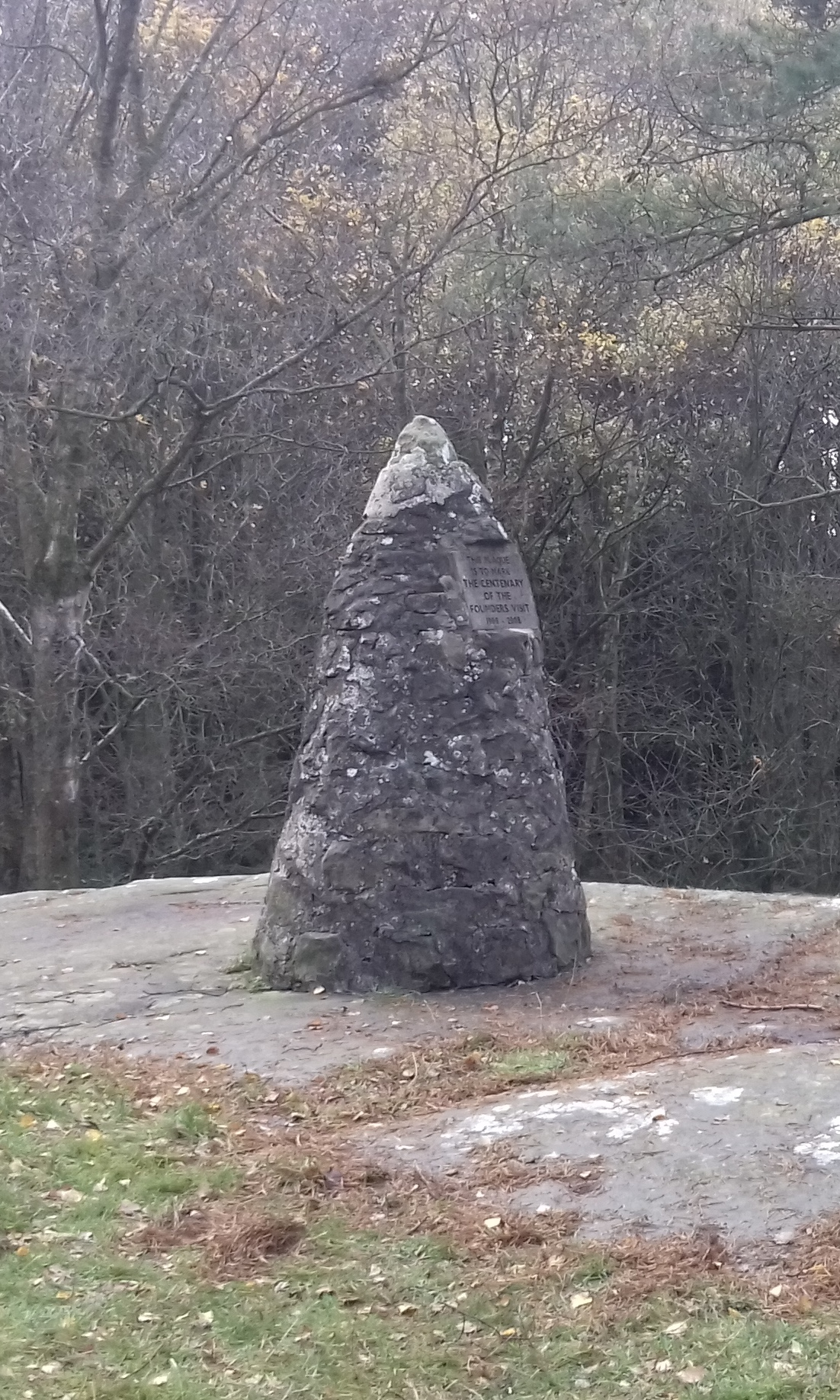
Cairn remembering the 1908 Lookwide camp at Fourstones near Humshaugh, the first proper Scout Camp

=== Original Scout Law ===
The scouts law is for boys, as follows;

- A Scout's honour is to be trusted – This means the scout will try as best as he can to do what he promised, or what is asked of him
- A Scout is loyal – to his king or queen, his leaders and his country.
- A Scout's duty is to be useful, and to help others
- A Scout is a friend to all, and a brother to every other Scout – Scouts help one another, regardless of the differences in status or social class.
- A Scout is courteous – He is polite and helpful to all, especially women, children and the elderly. He does not take anything for being helpful.
- A Scout is a friend to animals – He does not make them suffer or kill them without need to do so.
- A Scout obeys orders – Even the ones he does not like.
- A Scout smiles and whistles
- A Scout is thrifty – he avoids unnecessary spending of money.
- A Scout is clean in thought, word and deed (added later)

=== Promise of 1908 ===
Scouting for boys, introduced the Scout promise, as follows:

Before he becomes a scout, a boy must take the scout's oath, thus:

"On my honour I promise that—
1. I will do my duty to God and the King.
2. I will do my best to help others, whatever it costs me.
3. I know the scout law, and will obey it."

While taking this oath the scout will stand, holding his right hand raised level with his shoulder, palm to the front, thumb resting on the nail of the little finger and the other three fingers upright, pointing upwards:—

This is the scout's salute.

=== Worldwide spread ===
The Boy Scout Movement swiftly established itself throughout the British Empire. By 1908, Scouts were established in Gibraltar, Malta, Canada, Australia, New Zealand, Malaya (YMCA Experimental Troop in Penang) and South Africa. In 1909 Chile was possibly the first country outside the British dominions to have a national Scout organization. By 1910, Argentina, Denmark, Finland, France, Germany, Greece, India, Mexico, the Netherlands, Norway, Russia, Sweden, and the United States had Boy Scouts.

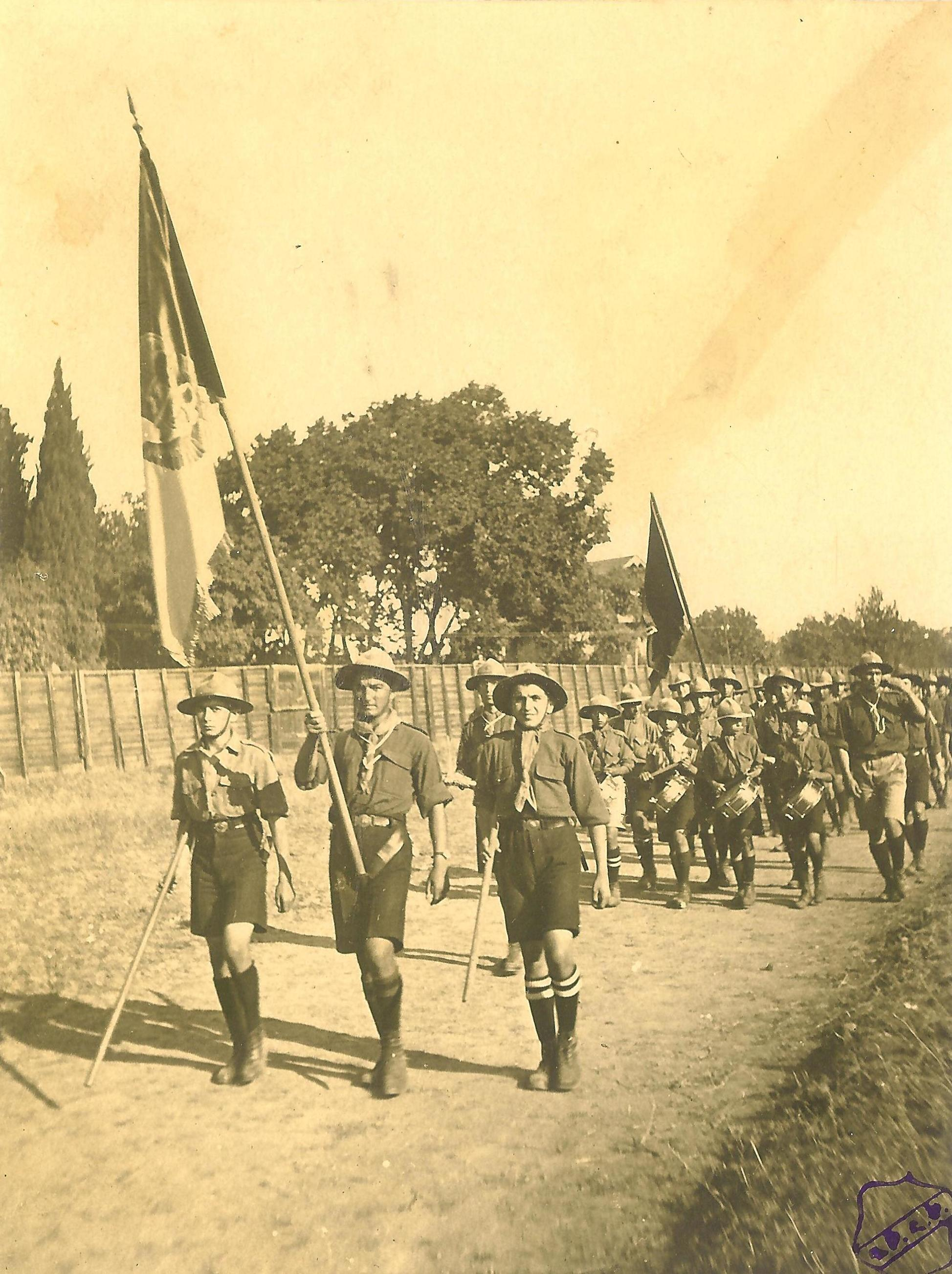
First procession of Armenian scouts in Constantinople in 1918

=== Associated programs for younger children ===
Younger children, particularly younger siblings, too young to be Scouts and take the Scout Promise attended some Scout meetings and so programs for younger children were developed by some troops and organizations. Baden-Powell's Boy Scouts Association launched its Wolf Cubs in 1916, which Baden-Powell wanted to be distinct from Scouts in name, uniform and identity to ensure they did not give Scouts a juvenile image. In the United States, attempts at Cub programs began as early as 1911 but formal recognition by the Boy Scouts of America was not made until 1930. Some Scout organizations have associated programs for even younger children and infants.

=== Associated programs for older adolescents ===
Some Scout organizations developed programs for those who had grown too old to be Scouts but wanted to remain associated with and support Scout Troops. Baden-Powell's Boy Scouts Association formed its Rovers in 1918 for young men and its Guild of Old Scouts.

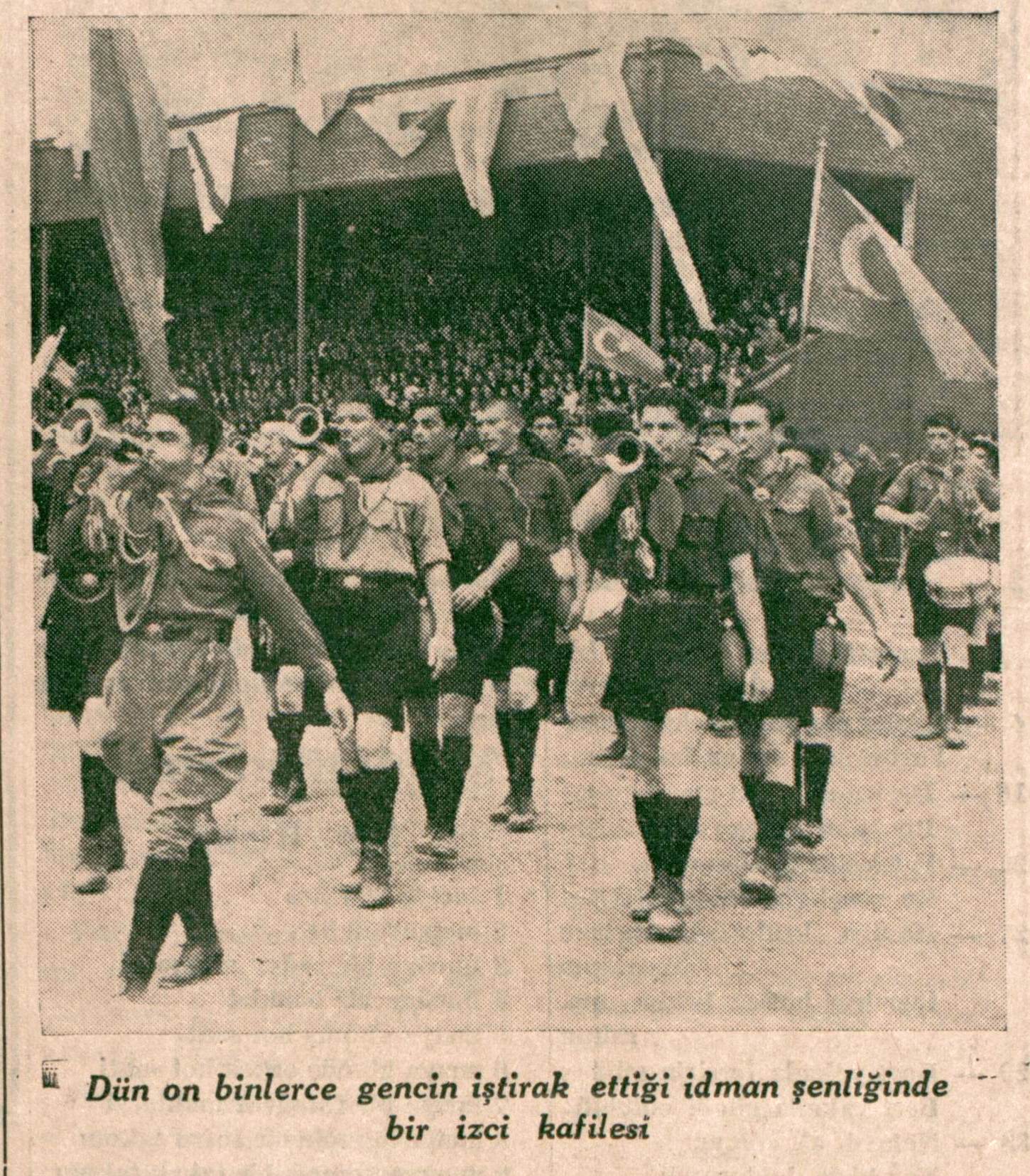
Parade of scouts during national celebrations in Turkey in 1937

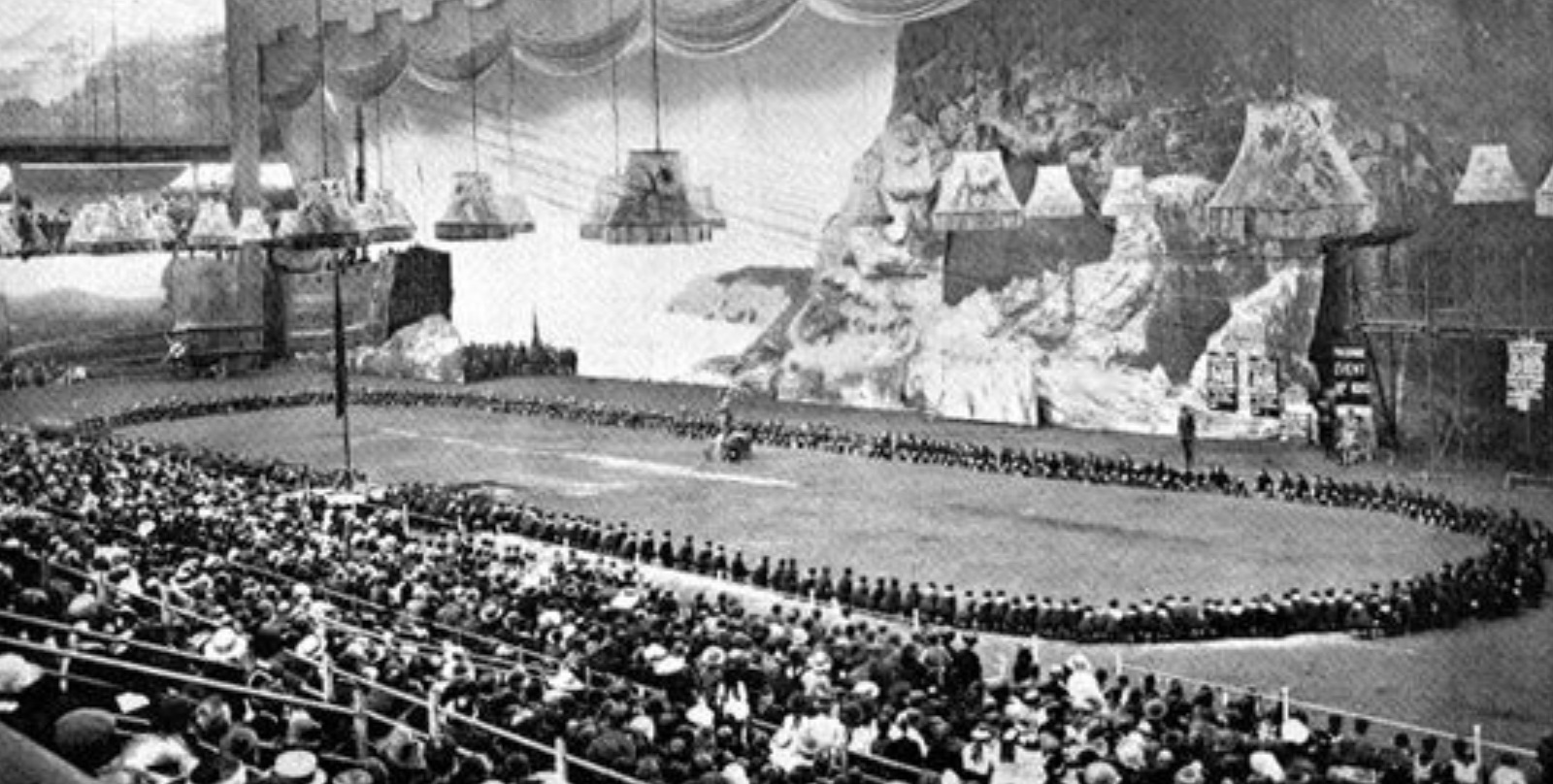
At the First World Jamboree in August 1920, 500 Wolf Cubs perform a Grand Howl in the arena at Olympia, London

=== Leader training ===
Baden-Powell's Boy Scouts Association held Scoutmaster training camps in London and Yorkshire in 1910 and 1911. Leader training was delayed by World War I. The Boy Scouts Association acquired Gilwell Park near London in 1919 as an adult training site and Scout campsite and held its first Wood Badge training there in 1919. The Wood Badge was copied in many other national scout organizations. Baden-Powell also wrote Aids to Scoutmastership to help Scout leaders.

=== Influences ===
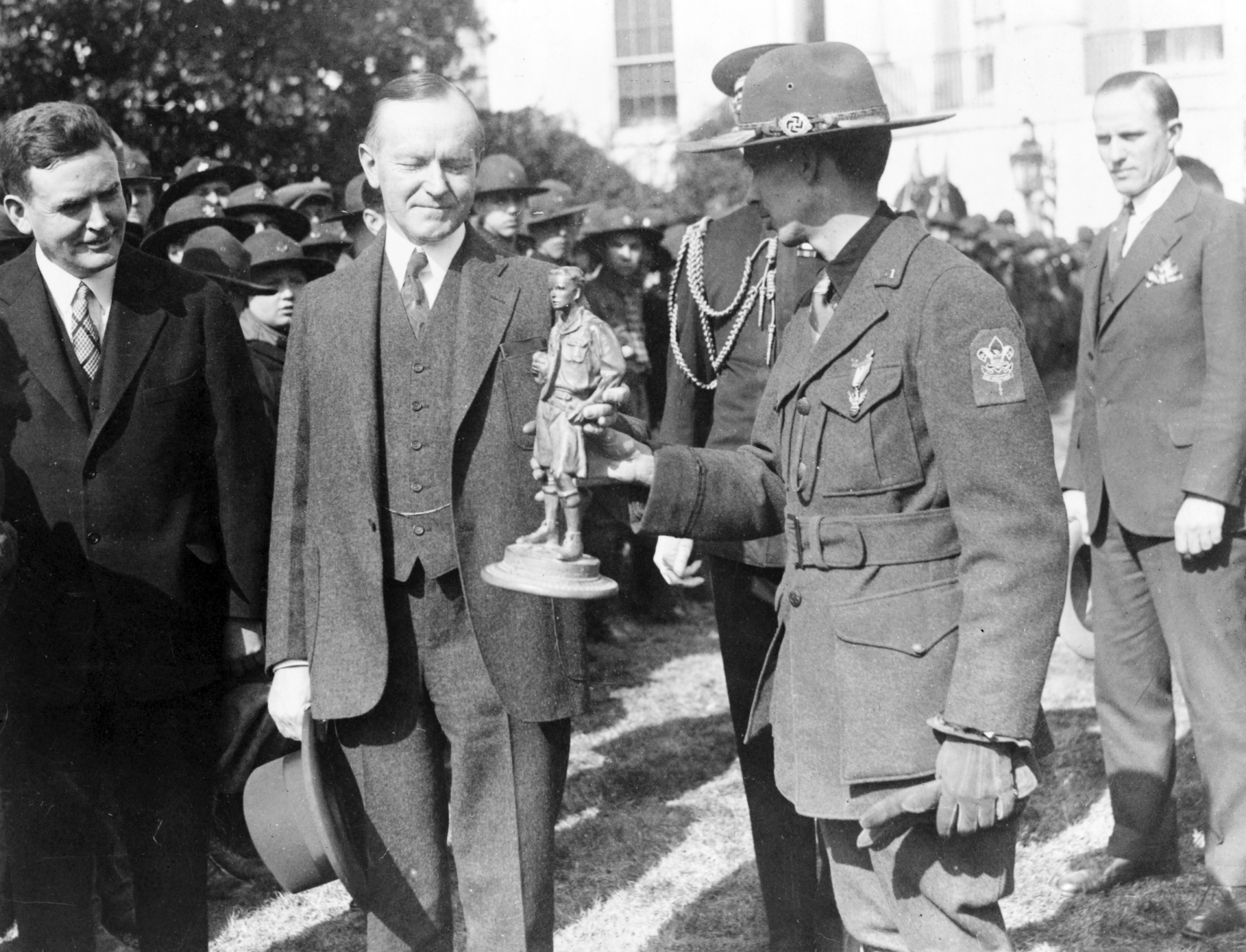
U.S. President Calvin Coolidge greeting 1500 Boy Scouts making an annual trip to the Capitol, 1927

Important elements of Scout training have their origins in Baden-Powell's experiences in education and military training. He was a 50-year-old retired army general when he wrote Scouting for boys and his writing inspired thousands of young people from all parts of society to get involved in activities that most had never contemplated. Comparable organizations in the English-speaking world are the Boys' Brigade and the non-militaristic Woodcraft Folk; however, they never matched the development and growth of the Scout Movement.

At Charterhouse, one of England's most famous public schools, Baden-Powell had an interest in the outdoors. Later, as a military officer, Baden-Powell was stationed in British India in the 1880s where he took an interest in military scouting and in 1896, Baden-Powell was assigned to the Matabeleland region in Southern Rhodesia (now Zimbabwe) as Chief of Staff to Gen.

Frederick Carrington during the Second Matabele War. In June 1896 he met here and began a lifelong friendship with Frederick Russell Burnham, the American-born Chief of Scouts for the British Army in Africa. This was a formative experience for Baden-Powell not only because he had the time of his life commanding reconnaissance missions into enemy territory, but because many of his later Boy Scout ideas originated here. During their joint scouting patrols into the Matobo Hills, Burnham augmented Baden-Powell's woodcraft skills, inspiring him and sowing seeds for both the program and for the code of honor later published in Scouting for Boys. Practiced by frontiersmen of the American Old West and indigenous peoples of the Americas, woodcraft was generally little known to the British Army but well known to the American scout Burnham. These skills eventually formed the basis of what is now called scoutcraft, the fundamentals of Scout training. Both men recognized that wars in Africa were changing markedly and the British Army needed to adapt; so during their joint scouting missions, Baden-Powell and Burnham discussed the concept of a broad training program in woodcraft for young men, rich in exploration, tracking, fieldcraft, and self-reliance. During this time in the Matobo Hills Baden-Powell first started to wear his signature campaign hat like the one worn by Burnham, and acquired his kudu horn, the Ndebele war instrument he later used every morning at Brownsea Island to wake the first Boy Scouts and to call them together in training courses.

Three years later, in South Africa during the Second Boer War, Baden-Powell was besieged in the small town of Mafikeng (Mafeking) by a much larger Boer army. The Mafeking Cadet Corps was a group of youths that supported the troops by carrying messages, which freed the men for military duties and kept the boys occupied during the long siege. The Cadet Corps performed well, helping in the defence of the town (1899–1900) and were one of the many factors that inspired Baden-Powell to write Scouting for boys. Each member received a badge that illustrated a combined compass point and spearhead. The badge's logo was similar to the fleur-de-lis shaped arrowhead that later adopted by Scout. The siege of Mafeking was the first time since his own childhood that Baden-Powell, a regular serving soldier, had come into the same orbit as "civilians"—women and children—and discovered for himself the usefulness of well-trained boys.

In the United Kingdom, the public, through newspapers, followed Baden-Powell's struggle to hold Mafeking, and when the siege was broken he had become a national hero. This rise to fame fuelled the sales of the small instruction book he had written in 1899 about military scout training and survival, Aids to scouting, that owed much to what he had learned from discussions with Burnham.

On his return to England, Baden-Powell noticed that boys showed considerable interest in Aids to scouting, which was unexpectedly used by teachers and youth organizations. He was urged to rewrite this book for boys, especially during an inspection of the Boys' Brigade (of which he was vice president at the time), a large youth movement drilled with military precision. Baden-Powell thought this would not be attractive and suggested that the Boys' Brigade could grow much larger if scouting was included. He studied other schemes, parts of which he used in Scouting for boys.

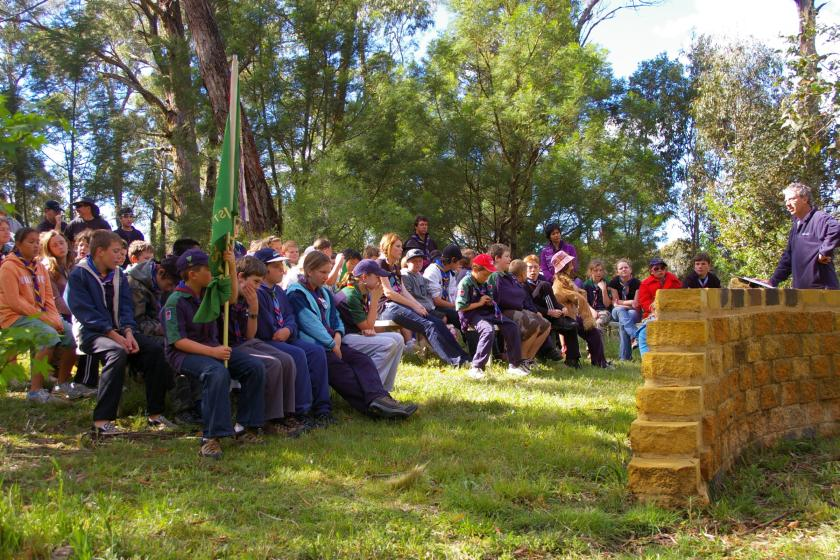
Australian Scouts attend Scouts' Own, an informal, spiritual Scout ceremony

A wide variety of cultures have adopted Scout training. Scouts in the United States use images drawn from the U.S. frontier experience and American native peoples for their connection with nature and wilderness survival skills which can be used as part of the training program. By contrast, British Scouting makes use of imagery drawn from its wider colonial frontiers including Canada, the Indian subcontinent, Australia and Africa and writings such as Rudyard Kipling's.

Frontier and military scouts inspired interest in playing and training as Scouts. Baden-Powell wrote his military training book, Aids to scouting because he saw the need for the improved training of British soldiers and army scouts, particularly in initiative, self-reliance, and observational skills. The book's popularity with young boys surprised him. He adapted the book as Scouting for boys.

"Duty to God" is a principle of the Scout Movement, though it is applied differently in various countries. Scouting America takes a strong position, excluding atheists. The Scout Association in the United Kingdom permits variations to its Promise, in order to accommodate different religious obligations. While for example in the predominantly atheist Czech Republic the Scout oath does not mention God altogether with the organization being strictly irreligious, in 2014, United Kingdom Scouts were given the choice of being able to make a variation of the Promise that replaced "duty to God" with "uphold our Scout values", Scouts Canada defines Duty to God broadly in terms of "adherence to spiritual principles" and leaves it to the individual member or leader whether they can follow a Scout Promise that includes Duty to God. Worldwide, roughly one in three Scouts are Muslim.

== Scout Movement characteristics ==
Scouts use the Scout method, which incorporates an informal educational system that emphasizes practical activities in the outdoors. Programs exist for Scouts ranging in age from 6 to 25 (though age limits vary slightly by country), and program specifics target Scouts in a manner appropriate to their age.

=== Scout method ===
The Scout method is the principal method by which Scout organizations and Scouts, operate their units. One description of the Scout Movement is: "a voluntary nonpolitical educational movement for young people open to all without distinction of origin, race or creed, in accordance with the purpose, principles and method conceived by the Founder". It is the goal of Scouting "to contribute to the development of young people in achieving their full physical, intellectual, social and spiritual potentials as individuals, as responsible citizens and as members of their local, national and international communities."

Scout principles describe a code of behaviour for all members and characterize the Scout Movement. The Scout method is a progressive system designed to achieve these goals, comprising seven elements: law and promise, learning by doing, team system, symbolic framework, personal progression, nature, and adult support. While community service is a major element of both the WOSM and WAGGGS programs, WAGGGS includes it as an extra element of the Scout method: service in the community.

The Scout Law and Promise embody the values of the Scout movement and bind all Scouts together. The emphasis on "learning by doing" provides experiences and hands-on orientation as a practical method of learning and building self-confidence. Small groups build unity, camaraderie, and a close-knit fraternal atmosphere. These experiences, along with an emphasis on trustworthiness and personal honor, help to develop responsibility, character, self-reliance, self-confidence, reliability, and readiness; which eventually lead to collaboration and leadership. A program with a variety of progressive and attractive activities expands a Scout's horizon and bonds the Scout even more to the group. Activities and games provide an enjoyable way to develop skills such as dexterity. In an outdoor setting, they also provide contact with the natural environment.

Since the origins of the Scout Movement, Scouts have taken a Scout Promise to live up to ideals of the movement, and subscribe to the Scout Law. The form of the promise and laws have varied slightly by country and over time, but must fulfil the requirements of the WOSM to qualify a National Scout Association for membership.

The Scout Motto, "Be Prepared", has been used in various languages by millions of Scouts since 1907. Less well-known is the Scout Slogan, "Do a good turn daily".

=== Activities ===
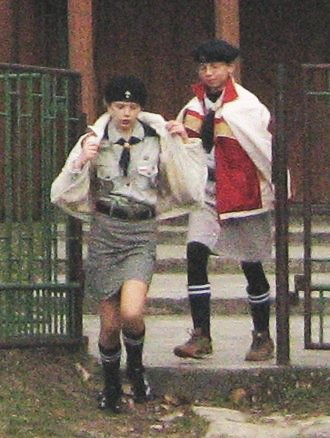
Girl Guides leave a Catholic church in Poland.

Common ways to implement the Scout method include having Scouts spending time together in small groups with shared experiences, rituals, and activities, and emphasizing "good citizenship" and decision-making by young people in an age-appropriate manner. Weekly meetings often take place in local centres known as Scout dens. Cultivating a love and appreciation of the outdoors and outdoor activities is a key element. Primary activities include camping, woodcraft, aquatics, hiking, backpacking, and sports.

Camping is most often arranged at the unit level, such as one Scout troop, but there are periodic camps (known in the US as "camporees") and "jamborees". Camps occur a few times a year and may involve several groups from a local area or region camping together for a weekend. The events usually have a theme, such as pioneering. World Scout Moots are gatherings, originally for Rover Scouts, but mainly focused on Scout Leaders. Jamborees are large national or international events held every four years, during which thousands of Scouts camp together for one or two weeks. Activities at these events will include games, Scoutcraft competitions, badge, pin or patch trading, aquatics, woodcarving, archery and activities related to the theme of the event.

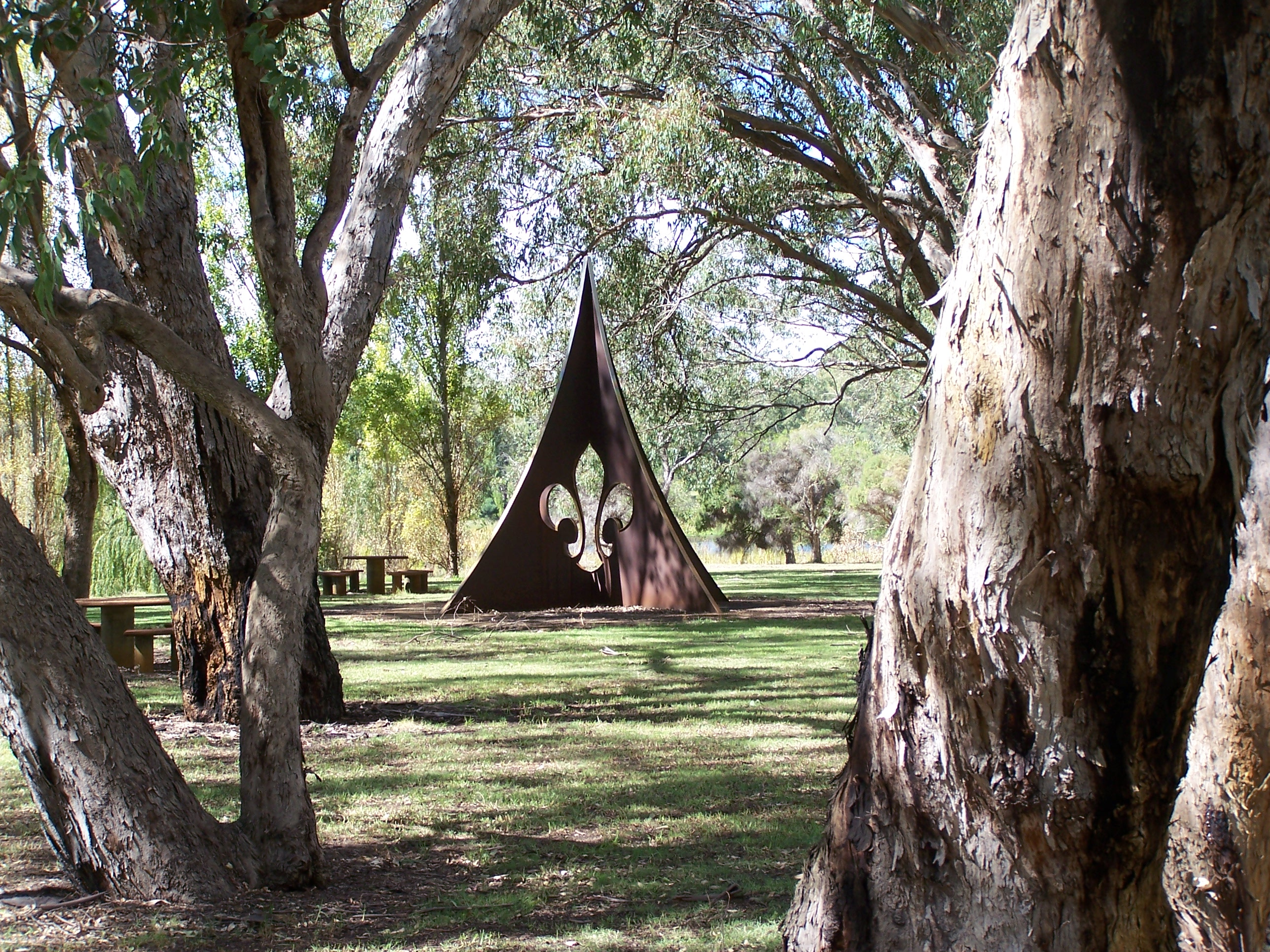
Sculpture erected in 1982 to commemorate the 1979 Jamboree at Perry Lakes Western Australia and 75 years of the Scout Movement

In some countries a highlight of the year for Scouts is spending at least a week in the summer engaging in an outdoor activity. This can be a camping, hiking, sailing, or other trip with the unit, or a summer camp with broader participation (at the council, state, or provincial level). Scouts attending a summer camp work on Scout badges, advancement, and perfecting Scoutcraft skills. Summer camps can operate specialty programs for older Scouts, such as sailing, backpacking, canoeing and whitewater, caving, and fishing.

Scouting promotes international harmony and peace. Various initiatives towards achieving this aim include the development of activities that benefit the wider community, challenge prejudice and encourage tolerance of diversity. Such programs include co-operation with non-Scout organisations including various NGOs, the United Nations and religious institutions as set out in The Marrakech Charter.

=== Uniforms and distinctive insignia ===
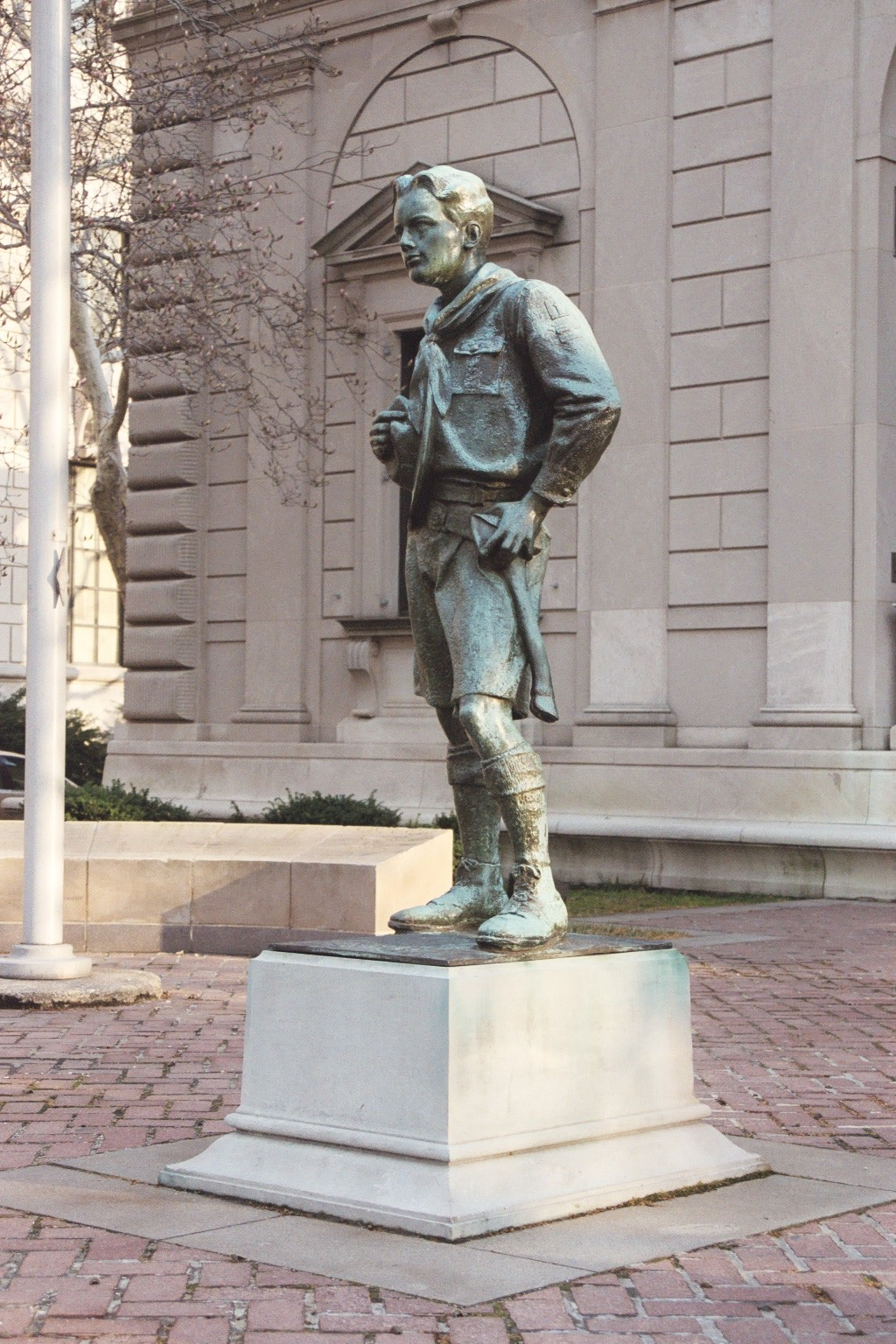
The R. Tait McKenzie sculpture Ideal Scout depicts a Scout in traditional uniform

The Scout uniform is a widely recognized characteristic. Baden-Powell said the uniform "hides all differences of social standing in a country and makes for equality; but, more important still, it covers differences of country and race and creed, and makes all feel that they are members with one another of the one great brotherhood". The original uniform, still widely recognized, consisted of a khaki button-up shirt, shorts, and a broad-brimmed campaign hat. Baden-Powell also wore shorts, because he believed that being dressed like a Scout helped to reduce the age-imposed distance between adult and youth. Uniform shirts are now frequently blue, orange, red or green and shorts are frequently replaced by long trousers all year or only under cold weather.

While designed for smartness and equality, the Scout uniform is also practical. Shirts traditionally have thick seams to make them ideal for use in makeshift stretchers—Scouts were trained to use them in this way with their staves, a traditional but deprecated item. The leather straps and toggles of the campaign hats or Leaders' Wood Badges could be used as emergency tourniquets, or anywhere that string was needed in a hurry. Neckerchiefs were chosen as they could easily be used as a sling or triangular bandage by a Scout in need. Scouts were encouraged to use their garters for shock cord where necessary.

Distinctive insignia for all are Scout uniforms, recognized and worn the world over, include the Wood Badge and the World Membership Badge. Scouts use a fleur-de-lis emblem while members of the World Association of Girl Guides and Girl Scouts (WAGGGS) use a trefoil.

The fylfot (now more commonly called a swastika) was used by the Boy Scouts Association of the United Kingdom and others in early thanks badges from 1911. Lord Baden-Powell's 1922 design for the Medal of Merit added a swastika to the Scout Arrowhead to symbolize good luck for the recipient. In 1934, Scouters requested a change to the design because of the connection of the swastika with its more recent use by the German National Socialist Workers (Nazi) Party. A new Medal of Merit was issued by the Boy Scouts Association in 1935.

== Age groups and sections ==
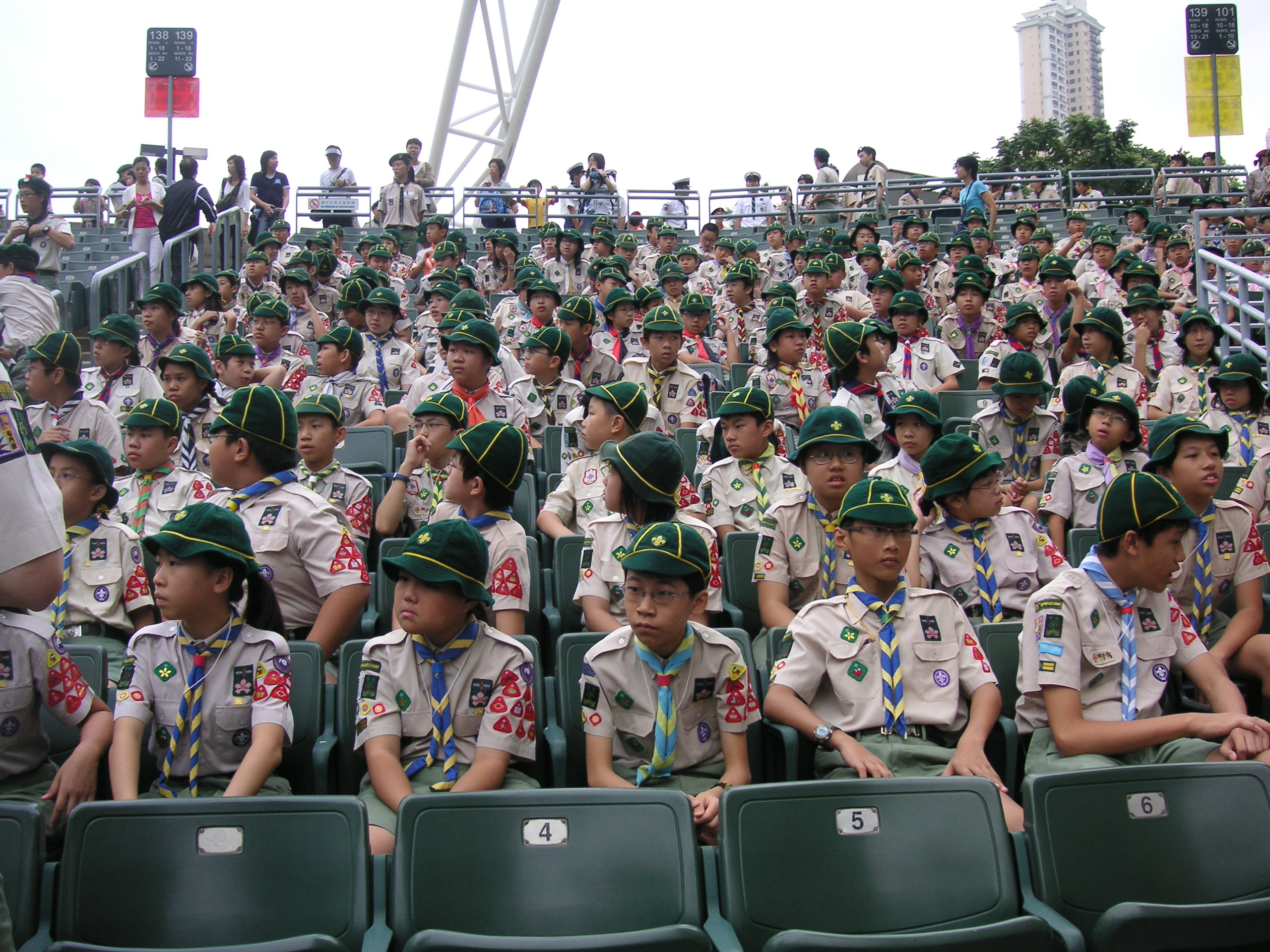
A group of Hong Kong Cub Scouts

In addition to Scouts, many Scout and Guide organizations have developed other programs for other age groups. These age divisions have varied over time as they adapt to the local culture and environment.

Scouts are youths between the ages of 11 and 17. In most Scout organizations, this age group composes the Boy Scout, Girls Scouts or Guides. Some organizations developed other programs for those who had become too old to remain Scouts or were too young to be Scouts and take the Scout Promise (e.g. Cubs for ages 6 to 10). Many organizations split training of Scouts and Guides into "junior" and "senior" groups. The age ranges vary by organization.

Traditional age groups as they were between 1920 and 1940 in most organizations:
Age range	Boys section	Girls section
8 to 10	Wolf Cubs	Brownie Guide
11 to 17	Boy Scout	Girl Guide or Girl Scout
18 and up	Rover Scout	Ranger Guide

The national programs for younger children include Lions, Tigers, Wolves, Bears, Webelos, Arrow of the Light Scouts, Cubs, Brownies, Daisies, Rainbow Guides, Beavers, Joeys, Keas, and Teddies. Programs for post-adolescents and young adults include Rovers the Rangers and Young Leaders, Rovers, Senior Scouts, Venturer Scouts, Explorer Scouts, and the Scout Network. Many organizations also have a program for those with special needs, often known as Extension Scouting. The Scout Method has been adapted to specific programs such as Air Scouts, Sea Scouts, Mounted Scouts and Scout bands.

Some Scout organizations use the local Scout Group structure which contain units operating programs for different ages.

== Adults and leadership ==
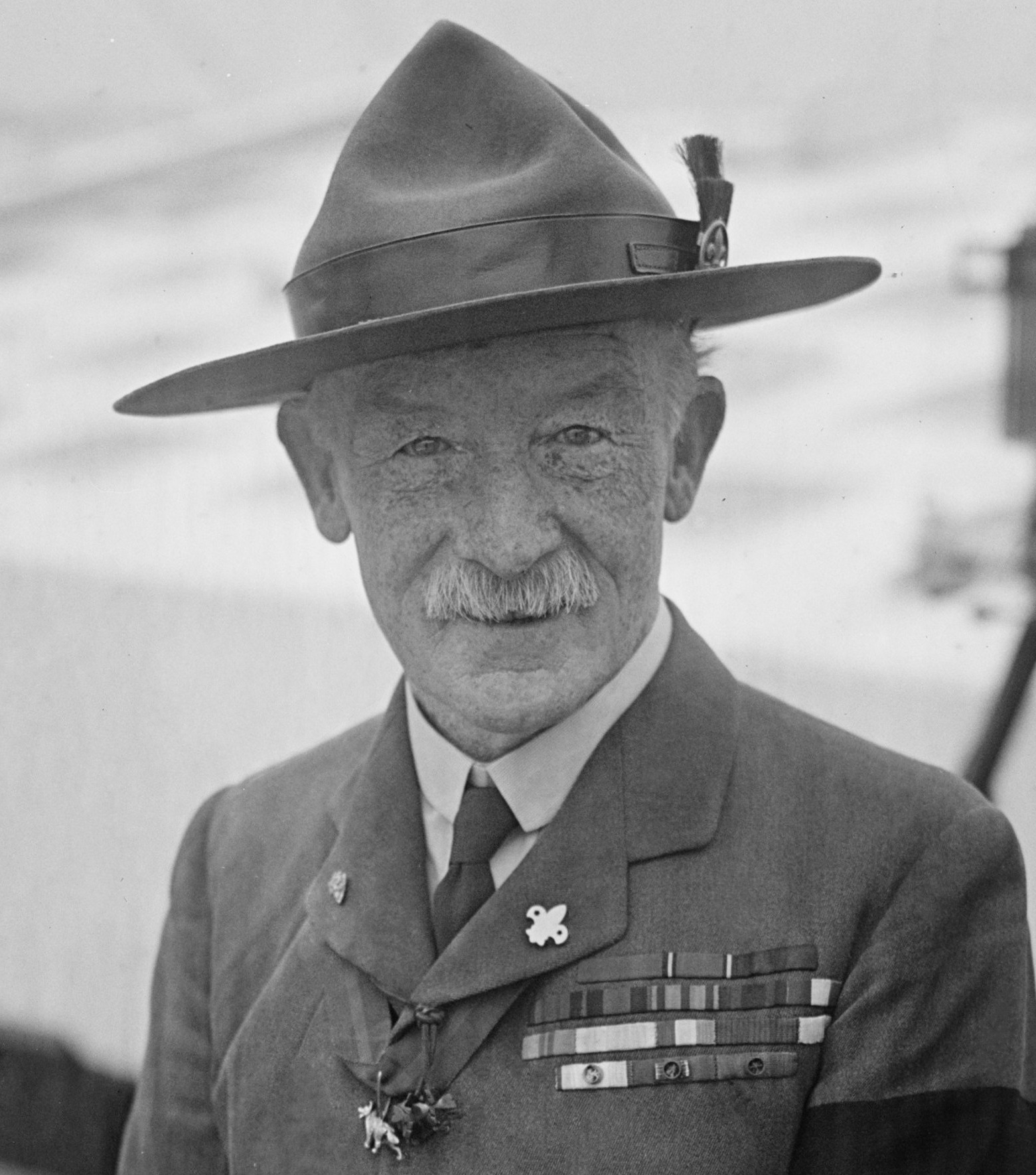
Robert Baden-Powell

Adults supporters, including former Scouts and Guides, can often join organizations such as the International Scout and Guide Fellowship. In the United States and the Philippines, university students might join the co-ed service fraternity Alpha Phi Omega. In the United Kingdom, university students might join the Student Scout and Guide Organisation and, after graduation, the Scout and Guide Graduate Association. In some organizations, it is possible for adults to join support groups such as ScoutLink or a Trefoil Guild without being an adult leader.

Scout units are usually operated by adult volunteers, such as parents and carers, former Scouts, students, and community leaders, including teachers and religious leaders. Scout Leadership positions are often divided into 'uniform' and 'lay' positions. Uniformed leaders have received formal training, such as the Wood Badge, and have received a warrant for a rank within the organization. Lay members commonly hold part-time roles such as meeting helpers, committee members and advisors, though there are a small number of full-time lay professionals.

A unit has uniformed positions—such as the Scoutmaster and assistants—whose titles vary among countries. In some countries, units are supported by lay members, who range from acting as meeting helpers to being members of the unit's committee. In some Scout associations, the committee members may also wear uniforms and be registered Scout leaders.

Above the unit are further uniformed positions, called Commissioners, at levels such as district, county, council or province, depending on the structure of the national organization. Commissioners work with lay teams and professionals. Training teams and related functions are often formed at these levels. In the UK and in other countries, the national Scout organization appoints the Chief Scout, the most senior uniformed member.

== Around the world ==
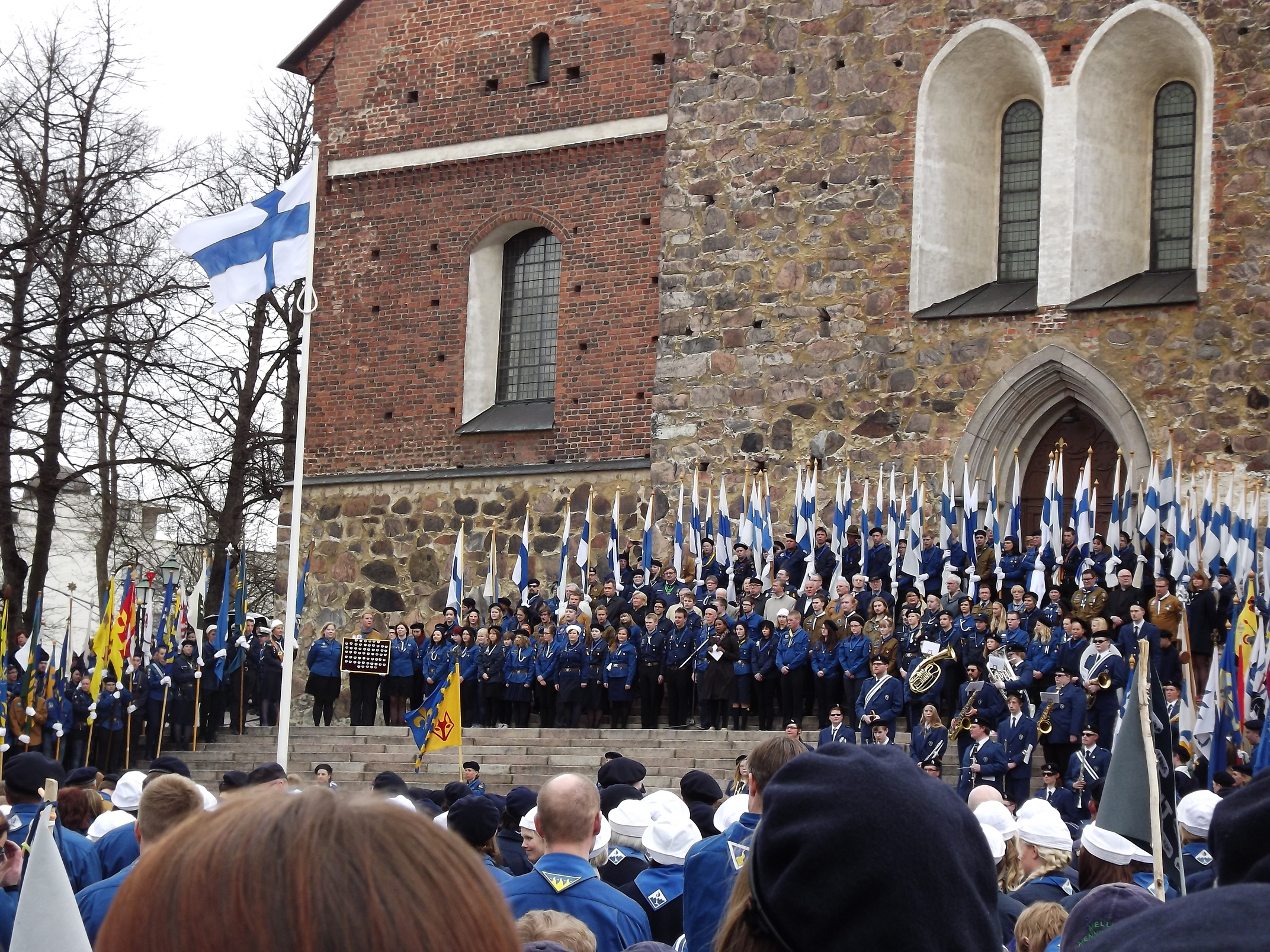
A parade of Finnish scouts in front of the Turku Cathedral on May 6, 2012

Following its origins in the United Kingdom, the Scout Movement spread around the world. Possibly the first national organization outside the British Empire was founded in Chile on 21 May 1909, after a visit by Baden Powell. In most countries, there is now at least one Scout organization. International Scout organizations were formed. In 1911, the World Scouts were formed. In 1922 the World Organization of the Scout Movement was formed and organizes its World Scout Jamboree every four years. In 1928 the World Association of Girl Guides and Girl Scouts for female-only national Scout and Guide organizations and operates four international centres: Our Cabaña in Mexico, Our Chalet in Switzerland, Pax Lodge in the United Kingdom, and Sangam in India.

=== Co-educational ===
There have been different approaches to co-education in the Scout Movement. Some countries have maintained separate organizations for boys and girls, In other countries, especially within Europe, Scout and Guide organizations have merged and there is a single organization for boys and girls. The United States–based Boy Scouts of America permitted girls to join in early 2018. In others, such as Australia and the United Kingdom, the national Scout association has opted to admit both boys and girls, but is only a member of the WOSM, while the national Guide association has remained as a separate movement and member of the WAGGGS. In some countries like Greece, Slovenia and Spain there are separate associations for Scouts, that are members of WOSM, and for Guides, that are members of WAGGGS, both admitting boys and girls.

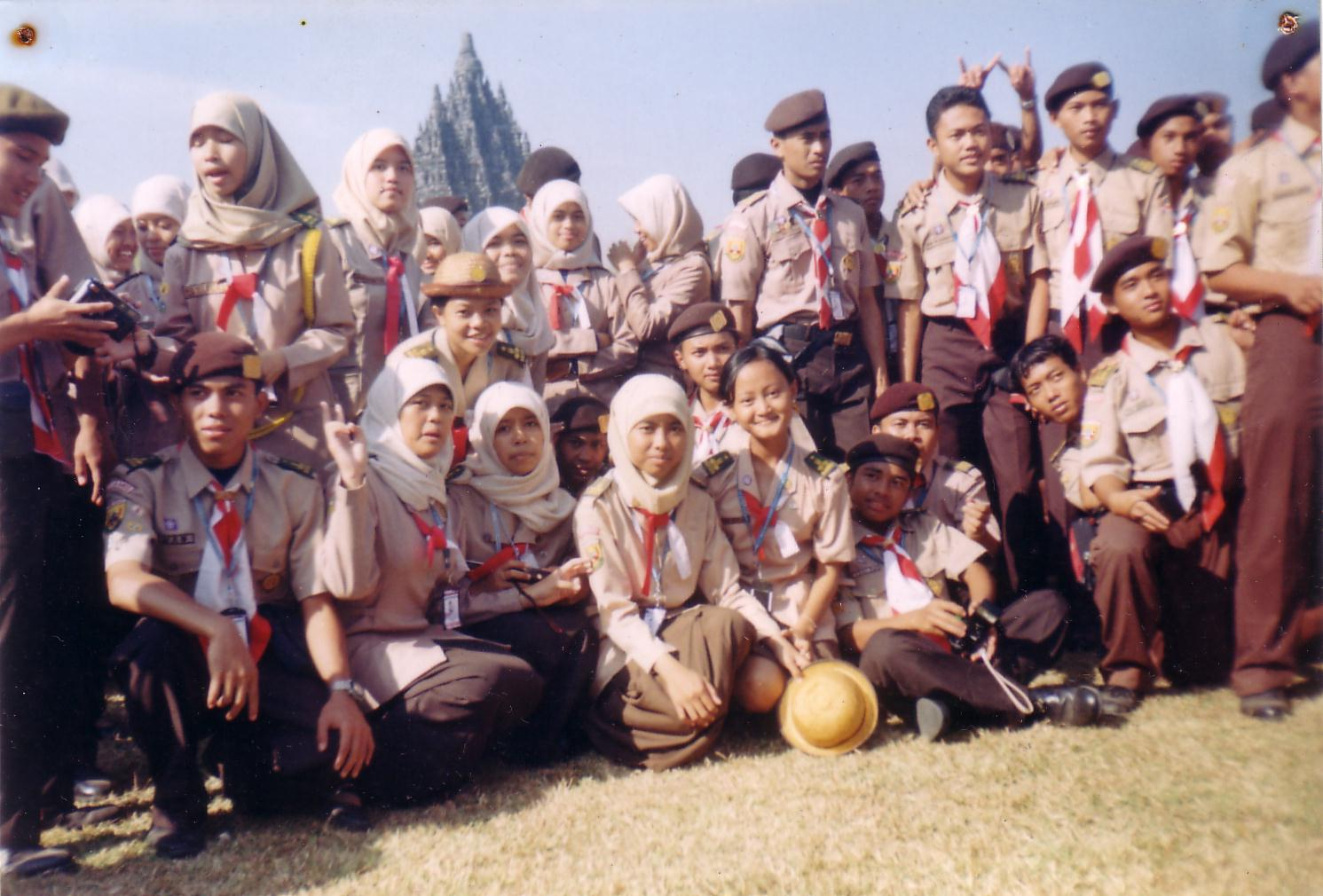
Indonesian Scouts at the 8th Indonesian National Rover Moot, 8–17 July 2003 in Prambanan Temple, Yogyakarta

The Scout Association in the United Kingdom has been co-educational at all levels since 1991, and this was optional for groups until the year 2000 when new sections were required to accept girls. The Scout Association transitioned all Scout groups and sections across the UK to become co-educational by January 2007, the year of the Scout Movement's centenary. The traditionalist Baden-Powell Scouts' Association has been co-educational since its formation in 1970.

In the United States, the Cub Scout and Boy Scout programs of the BSA were for boys only until 2018; it has changed its policies and is now inviting girls to join, as local packs organize all-girl dens (same uniform, same book, same activities). For youths age 14 and older, Venturing has been co-educational since the 1930s. The Girl Scouts of the USA (GSUSA) is an independent organization founded in 1912 for girls and young women only. Adult leadership positions in the BSA and GSUSA are open to both men and women.

In 2006, of the 155 WOSM member National Scout Organizations (representing 155 countries), 122 belonged only to WOSM, and 34 belonged to both WOSM and WAGGGS. Of the 122 which belonged only to WOSM, 95 were open to boys and girls in some or all program sections, and 20 were only for boys. All 34 that belonged to both WOSM and WAGGGS were open to boys and girls.

WAGGGS had 144 Member Organizations in 2007 and 110 of them belonged only to WAGGGS. Of these 110, 17 were coeducational and 93 admitted only girls.

=== Membership ===
As of 2019, there are over 46 million registered Scouts and as of 2020 9 million registered Guides around the world, from 216 countries and territories.

Top 20 countries with Scouts and Guides, sorted by total male and female membership of all organisations. (Note: Full tables on List of World Organization of the Scout Movement members and List of World Association of Girl Guides and Girl Scouts members.)
Country	Membership	Population participation	Scouting introduced	Guiding introduced
Indonesia	24,760,000	9.2%	1912	1912
India	5,930,000	0.4%	1909	1911
United States	4,910,000	1.8%	1910	1912
Philippines	3,340,000	3.2%	1910	1918
Kenya	2,400,000	4.2%	1910	1920
Bangladesh	2,090,000	1.3%	1914	1928
United Kingdom	940,000	1.8%	1907	1909
Nigeria	870,000	0.4%	1915	1919
Pakistan	830,000	0.4%	1909	1911
Thailand	810,000	1.2%	1911	1957
Tanzania	630,000	1.0%	1917	1928
Uganda	570,000	1.3%	1915	1914
Malawi	430,000	2.2%	1931	1924
Malaysia	400,000	1.2%	1908	1916
Turkey	290,000	0.4%	1909	
Germany (Note: Including 90,000 non-aligned Scouts and Guides, see Scouting in Germany)	250,000	0.3%	1910	1912
Italy (Note: Including 30,000 non-aligned Scouts and Guides, see Scouting in Italy)	230,000	0.4%	1910	1912
Canada	220,000	0.5%	1908	1910
France (Note: Including 60,000 non-aligned Scouts and Guides, see Scouting in France)	210,000	0.3%	1910	1911
Belgium (Note: Including 5,000 non-aligned Scouts and Guides, see Scouting in Belgium)	170,000	1.5%	1911	1915

=== Nonaligned and Scout-like organizations ===
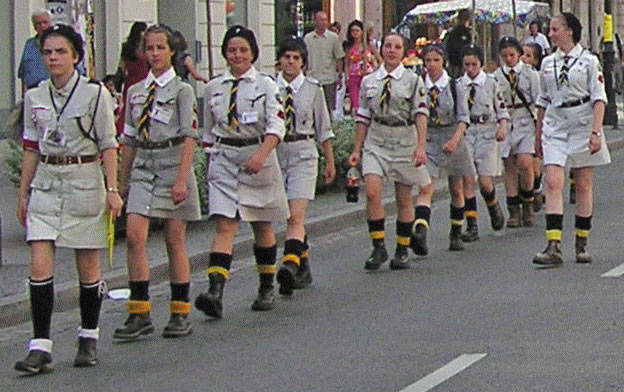
Girl Guides from the Polish ZHR, an associate member of the CES

The Scout Movement is a pluralist movement, not a unitary or hierarchical organization. Before the establishment of national Scout organizations, the Scout training and the Scout Movement were the purview of the world's youth and before the formation of international Scout organizations, several national Scout organizations had already formed in many countries.

Alternative organization have formed since the origins of the Scout Movement. Many early organizations were formed on religious, gender, ethnic or language lines or differed on the influence of militarism or pacifism. More recently formed alternate organizations often differ on social, political and/or organizational issues. Some believe that other Scout organizations have moved away from original intents and want to return to earlier, simpler, traditional methods. Others do not want to follow all Scout principles or those of particular international organizations and their national member organizations but still desire to participate in Scout activities.

In 2008, there were at least 539 independent Scout organizations around the world, Only 367 of them were members of WOSM or WAGGGS. About half of the remaining 172 Scout organizations are only local or national oriented. About 90 other national or regional Scout organizations have created other international Scout organizations:

- Order of World Scouts, the first international Scout organisation, founded in 1911.
- International Union of Guides and Scouts of Europe, an independent faith-based Scout organization founded in 1956.
- Confederation of European Scouts, established in 1978.
- World Federation of Independent Scouts, formed in Laubach, Germany, in 1996.
- World Organization of Independent Scouts, mostly South-American, founded in 2010.

Some Scout-like organizations are also served by international organizations, many with religious elements, for example:

- Pathfinders – A youth organization of the Seventh-day Adventist Church, formed in 1950.
- Royal Rangers – A youth organization of the Assemblies of God, formed in 1962.

== Influence on society ==
After the origins of the Scout in the early 1900s, some nations' programs have taken part in social movements such as the nationalist resistance movements in India. Although Scouts was sometimes introduced in Africa by imperial officials as a way to strengthen their rule, the Scout principles helped to challenge the legitimacy of imperialism. Likewise, African Scouts used the Scout Law's principle that a Scout is a brother to all other Scouts to collectively claim full citizenship.

== Controversies ==
In the United Kingdom, The Scout Association had been criticised for its insistence on the use of a religious promise, leading the organization to introduce an alternative in January 2014 for those not wanting to mention a god in their promise. This change made the organisation entirely non-discriminatory on the grounds of race, gender, sexuality, and religion (or lack thereof).

The Boy Scouts of America was the focus of criticism in the United States for not allowing the open participation of homosexuals until removing the prohibition in 2013.

Socialist countries such as the Soviet Union and the fascist regimes like Nazi Germany often either absorbed the Scout movement into government-controlled organizations or banned Scouting entirely.

== In film and the arts ==
The Scout Movement has been a facet of culture during most of the twentieth and twenty-first centuries in many countries; numerous films and artwork focus on the subject. Movie critic Roger Ebert mentioned the scene in which the young Boy Scout, Indiana Jones, discovers the Cross of Coronado in the movie Indiana Jones and the Last Crusade, as "when he discovers his life mission".

The works of painters Ernest Stafford Carlos, Norman Rockwell, Pierre Joubert and Joseph Csatari and the 1966 film Follow Me, Boys! are prime examples of this ethos. Scout are often portrayed in a humorous manner, as in the 1989 film Troop Beverly Hills and the 2005 film Down and Derby. In 1980, Scottish singer and songwriter Gerry Rafferty recorded I was a Boy Scout as part of his Snakes and Ladders album.

== See also ==
- Pioneer movement
- Lookwide Camp
