= Scouting in the East Midlands =

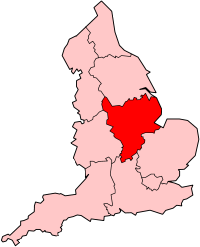

Scouting activities can be found throughout the English region of the East Midlands. The largest number of Scouts and volunteer leaders in the region is linked to the Scout Association of the United Kingdom, while there is also a presence of traditional Scouting groups, such as the Baden-Powell Scouts' Association. The Scout Association administers the region through five Scout Counties, overseen by a regional commissioner, which largely follow the boundaries of the ceremonial counties they exist within although in Lincolnshire the former Humberside county is still used. There are also a number of Scouting clubs within Universities in the region which are affiliated to the Student Scout and Guide Organisation. Scouting organisations at every level of the hierarchy also own and operate campsites and activity centres in the area for the benefit of Scouts, Guides and other youth groups.

== The Scout Association Counties ==
=== Derbyshire Scout County ===
The Derbyshire Scouting badge, as it appears on the uniform

Derbyshire Scout County is a Scout County of the Scout Association covering the majority of the administrative County of Derbyshire in England. The town of Glossop in the far North West of the county is not included in the Derbyshire Scout county but in the Greater Manchester East county instead. The county is led by a volunteer management team with a County Commissioner at its head, as of April 2021 Sue Harris, and supported by four deputies covering the core parts of the county: development, programme, support and training. There are also additional volunteer managers, assistant county commissioners and a trustee board to support the work of the county. It is divided into fifteen Scout Districts:-

- Alfreton covers villages near the Nottinghamshire border including Pinxton, Somercotes, South Normanton and Tibshelf.
- Belper and surrounding villages as far North as Heage, South as Duffield and East as Kilburn.
- Chesterfield
- Derby East covering the communities to the North East and East of the city.
- Derby North covering the communities to the North and South West of the city. Includes the villages of Etwall and Hilton to the South West of the city.
- Derby South covering the communities to the South of the city.
- Derwent and Dove, named for the two rivers and consisting of the communities around and between these two rivers. Includes Matlock and Ashbourne.
- Dronfield also covers the town of Eckington.
- East Scarsdale, covering the settlements in the Eastern area of the former Hundred of Scarsdale and includes the towns of Bolsover, Killamarsh and Shirebrook.
- High Peak covering the South Western third of the High Peak borough including Buxton, Chapel-en-le-Frith, Hayfield and Whaley Bridge.
- Ilkeston
- Long Eaton
- Peak covering the South Eastern third of the High Peak borough and includes a large section of the Derbyshire Peak District.
- Ripley and Heanor including the surrounding villages.
- South Derbyshire covering the Southern salient of the South Derbyshire district and the area immediately South of Derby city.

Scouting has a long history in Derbyshire with the 1st Buxton, 2nd Chesterfield and 4th Derny (Derwent) Scout Groups being notable within the county as some of the founding troops of 1908. In addition, Olave Baden-Powell, the 'World Chief Guide', was born at Stubbing Court, Wingerworth, near Chesterfield and her husband, Robert Baden-Powell, the Founder of Scouting, wrote part of Scouting for Boys at the Izaak Walton Hotel in Ilam close to Dovedale in Derbyshire. Scouts in Derbyshire marked the centenary of Scouting in August 2007 at Sunrise ceremonies renewing their Scout Promise and included gatherings in Derby Market Place where 700 Scouts attended and screen Scout-made videos on the big screen there.

The county's badge, worn on the uniform of any member in the county, depicts a ram on a dark background. The Ram is a long-standing emblem of the city of Derby, initially through The Derby Ram folk tale, and the ram also forms part of the coat of arms of Derbyshire through a role as a bearer.

The county has a strong focus on activities and events and has county level clubs for activities including adventurous activities (archery, biking, fencing, bushcraft, rifle shooting, caving, hillwalking and climbing), water sports (paddle sports, diving and sailing), event support (first aid and communications) and teams in less conventional areas to run archaeology and creative sessions. Derbyshire villages are unusual in holding Well dressings during the summer. In 2005 the well at Whitwell had a theme acknowledging Peak 2005, Derbyshire's International Scout and Guide Camp at Chatsworth Park and in 2009 all of the wells in Chapel-en-le-Frith shared a common Scouting and Scout Badges theme to celebrate 100 years of Scouting in Chapel-en-le-Frith.

Derbyshire Scouts run a number of events for their Scouts. These include Activation, an annual activity day for Cubs, Scouts and Explorers; Big Shoot, a target sports competition held annually; the County Ball which is open to Scout Network and adult volunteers only and serves as a celebration and fundraising event; the David Lee Memorial Canoe Race, held annually on the River Dove; and the Rampage activity weekend for Scout Troops held annually. There are a number of events that are also open to members of Scouting and Guiding from outside the area including the Four Inns Walk and Kinder walking challenges in the Peak District, the Peak Camp and the Spring Bank camp.

==== Four Inns Walk ====
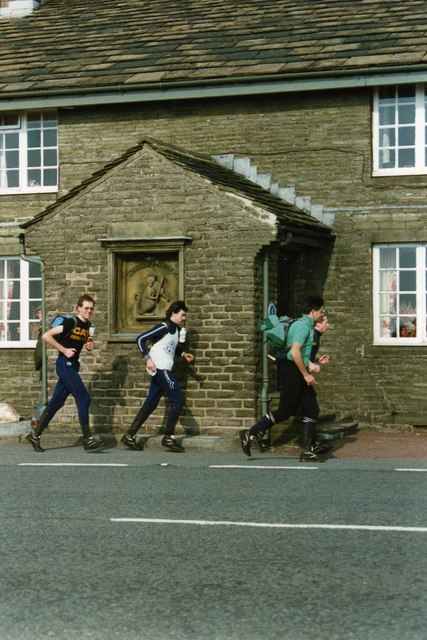
A team competing in the Four Inns Walk in 1988.

The Four Inns is a fell race/hiking event held annually over the high moorlands of the Northern Peak District organised by Derbyshire Scout County. It takes place mainly in Derbyshire (though it starts in Yorkshire and, near the end, makes a short detour into Cheshire), in northern England. It is a competitive event over 65 or 35 kilometers without an overnight camp, although teams must be equipped to bivouac if the conditions are severe enough to warrant it. It was first held as a Rover Scout event in 1957, but is now open to other teams of experienced hill walkers and fell runners.

==== Kinder Walks ====
The Kinder Extreme and the Kinder Challenge are a series of walks run annually as a hillwalking challenge for any member of Scouting and Girlguiding from across the country. Both walks are organised annually in the autumn and start and finish at Chapel-en-le-Frith. The Kinder Extreme walk has been running since 1967 on a 30 kilometre circular route that includes the peak of Kinder Scout and is open to older Scouts, Guides, Explorers and Scout Network. The Kinder Challenge is a smaller 16 kilometre circular route including some open landscape of the Peak District which was launched in 2008 for Scouts, Guides and Explorer Scouts.

==== Peak Camp ====
The Peak International Scout and Guide Camp is a joint event from both Derbyshire Scouts and Girlguiding Derbyshire. It was first held in 1974 and since 1980 has been held every five years in the summer at the Chatsworth House estate. It is open to Scouts and Guides from across the world and contains activities aimed at these core age ranges with some activities for older sections Explorers and Rangers. The most recent event to run, Peak 2015, catered to 4,500 young people and 1,500 volunteer staff.

==== Spring Bank ====
Held at the Drum Hill Campsite, Spring Bank Camp is an annual activity camp for Cubs, Scouts, Brownies and Guides from both Derbyshire and across the UK. It includes a range of adventurous activities for approximately 1,500 young people and is well known for their evening challenges and competitions in addition to craft village.

=== Leicestershire Scout County ===
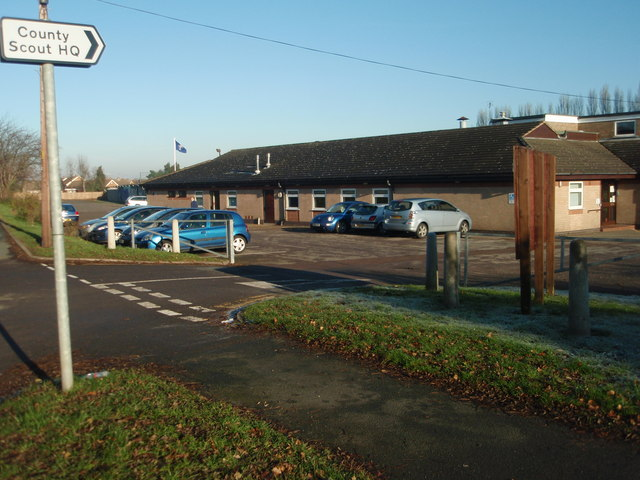
The former Leicestershire Scout County headquarters in Blaby.

Leicestershire Scout County is the Scout Association county covering the administrative County of Leicestershire. The county is led by a volunteer management team with a County Commissioner at its head, as of April 2021 Carol Black, and supported by four deputies and additional assistants to cover the different areas of the programme. The County is split into ten districts:

- Ashby & Coalville covering the areas around these towns including Markfield, Market Bosworth, Desford and Newbold Verdon.
- Charnwood containing the communities that form part of the Borough of Charnwood, except the communities in the North West quadrant around Loughborough.
- Harborough covering Market Harborough, the Kibworth area and other nearby villages.
- Hinckley
- Leicester North East covering the city centre, Northern and Eastern communities of the city.
- Leicester South East covering the South Eastern communities of the city including Wigston and Oadby.
- Leicester South West covering the Western and South Western communities of the city including Enderby, Blaby, Glenfield and Kirby Muxloe.
- Loughborough
- Melton Mowbray and the surrounding rural communities.
- South Leicestershire covering the Southern part of the county including Broughton Astley, Countesthorpe and Lutterworth.

The 1st Market Harborough Scout Group is notable within the county as one of the founding troops of 1908. Scouts in Leicestershire celebrated the centenary of Scouts in 2007 with the events accompanied by a drive to demonstrate the Scouts' inclusivity and encourage especially girls and Muslims to join.

The county's badge, worn on the uniform of any member in the county, depicts a fox running to the left above a wooden log. The fox is an enduring symbol of Leicestershire, appearing in the logo and coat of arms for Leicestershire County Council, Leicestershire County Cricket Club and Leicester City F.C. and is believed to extend from the county's history with fox hunting.

Leicestershire Scouts run a number of county level activity teams to develop leadership skills in these activities and to allow a broad range of young people a chance to experience these adventurous activities. There are clubs for caving, mountain biking, rifle shooting, water activities (in particular sailing and canoeing) and a sub aqua club teaching scuba diving and snorkelling.

==== Sub-Aqua Unit ====
Leicestershire Scout County run the Leicestershire Scouts Sub Aqua Unit (LSSAU), a Scout-based diving group providing experience in diving and snorkelling. Despite being based in Leicestershire, its membership is open to Scouts from across the UK and includes members of Girlguiding as well. It was formed in 1985 and teaches both scuba diving and snorkelling, the latter targeted at younger members such as Cub Scouts.

=== Lincolnshire Scout County ===
Lincolnshire Scout County is the Scout Association county covering the administrative counties of Rutland and much of Lincolnshire. The county is led by a volunteer management team with a County Lead Volunteer at its head, since May 2024 this has been Howard Nelson. The county is run from an office in Lincoln which provides support for Scouting in the counties. This includes support for growth in the County which saw the county win a national Scouting award in 2017 for growing membership by 12.5% over three years with 5,746 youth members and 2,129 volunteer leaders. The County is split into ten districts:

- Boston
- Gainsborough including Market Rasen and the wider West Lindsey borough.
- Grantham including the northern part of the South Kesteven borough.
- Lincoln
- Louth including the northern half of the East Lindsey borough.
- Rutland Prior to 2008, this was a separate Scout county in its own right.
- Skegness & Spilsby
- Sleaford including much of the North Kesteven borough.
- South Holland
- Stamford and Bourne including the southern part of the South Kesteven borough.

The county's badge, worn on the uniform of any member in the county, depicts the coat of arms of the City of Lincoln, a fleur-de-lis on a red cross on a white background contained within a shield shape on a green background.

==== Poacher ====
The Poacher International Jamboree is a major event, open to all Scouts and Guides aged 10 to 17 in all parts of the world, and is normally held approximately every 4 years in the county. It is a collaboration between Lincolnshire Scouts, Girlguiding Lincolnshire South and Girlguiding Lincolnshire North as a week long international camping experience. Participants camp in Lincolnshire Showground, where many of the activities also take place.

=== Northamptonshire Scout County ===
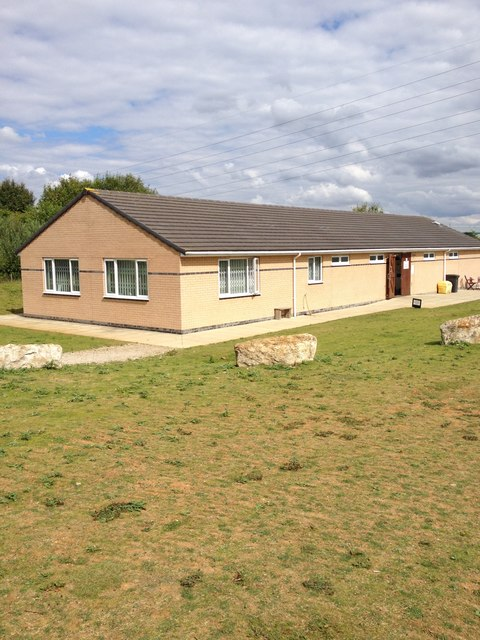
The Sir John Lowther Centre, where the County Office is based.

Northamptonshire Scout County is a Scout County of the Scout Association in the United Kingdom, covering the county of Northamptonshire. The county is led by a volunteer management team with a County Commissioner and a Chair of the Trustees at its head and supported by a series of other volunteers including three deputies. As of December 2021, the County Commissioner was Dean Smith and the Chair was Karen Tonks. The County is split into six districts:

- Daventry
- Glendon covering Kettering and Corby.
- Grafton covering much of South Northamptonshire including Brackley and Towcester.
- Nene Valley including Thrapston, Irthlingborough and Oundle.
- Northampton
- Wellingborough

The county's badge, worn on the uniform of any member in the county, depicts a red Lancastrian rose on a white shield with a light green chief containing two white Yorkist roses. The white and red roses along with the white field of the shield is common to some other organisations in the county and can be found on the coat of arms of the former Northamptonshire County Council and in the imagery of Northamptonshire Fire and Rescue Service although none have the light green chief.

The county houses a number of activity clubs and groups including a Northampton Scout Amateur Radio Group which was formed in 1981 and regularly takes part in events such as Jamboree on the Air.

=== Nottinghamshire Scout County ===
Nottinghamshire Scout County is the Scout Association County covering the ceremonial county of Nottinghamshire. Its county office is based in Linby and is also responsible for Hoveringham Activity Centre. The county is led by a volunteer management team with a County Commissioner, as of December 2021 Steven Tupper, four deputies, trustees and additional volunteers as well as some paid staff to support the operations of the county. The County is divided into nine Scout Districts:

- Ashfield
- Bassetlaw
- Beauvale
- Central Notts
- City of Nottingham
- Mansfield
- Newark
- Rushcliffe
- South West Notts

The 1st Nottingham (YMCA) Scout Group is notable within the county as one of the founding troops of 1908. The county's badge, worn on the uniform of any member in the county, depicts a large tree similar in appearance to the Major Oak in Sherwood Forest.

== Student Scout and Guide Organisation ==
There are six student associations at various universities in the region, each of which is affiliated to the Student Scout and Guide Organisation (SSAGO). These are De Montfort University Guides and Scouts (DeMUGS) covering De Montfort University, Derby University Guides and Scouts (DUGS) covering the University of Derby, Students of Leicester Universities Guides and Scouts (SLUGS) covering the University of Leicester, Lincoln University Guides and Scouts (LUGS) covering the University of Lincoln, SCOGUI covering the University of Loughborough and Nottingham SSAGO (SNoGS) covering the University of Nottingham and Nottingham Trent University.

Previously the Leicestershire universities shared a SSAGO club and a club used to exist at the University of Northampton

== Campsites ==
=== Derbyshire ===
Derbyshire has several campsites and activity centres run by and open to Scouts and other youth groups. Many of these are located within or near to the Peak District National Park and vary in facilities on offer. These include Bell's Box in Hathersage, a ten bed bunkhouse owned by the 79th Sheffield Scout Group; Boarfold Scout Campsite in Charlesworth, a wooded site accompanying a 2-acre (8,100 m^{2}) open field run by Tameside South Scout District in Greater Manchester East County with a 24-bed indoor accommodation suite; Gradbach Scout Camp in the upper Dane Valley and Spitewinter Scout Camp near Chesterfield.

Outside of the Peak District, there are other sites run by districts to enable Scout Groups to camp easily and practice outdoor skills including Scarcliffe Scout Campsite, formerly Birch Hill Plantation in Bolsover which is a 1-acre (4,000 m^{2}) grassland site that can camp up to 120 people and Trent Lock, a site on the South bank of the River Trent run by Long Eaton Scout District, accessed by boat and which provides water activities.

==== Drum Hill ====
Drum Hill Scout Camp is an 80-acre (320,000 m^{2}) site located in Little Eaton owned by Derbyshire Scouts and run for the benefit of young people since 1927. The site has three open areas for camping, large enough to hold 1,000 campers, and additional buildings for residential accommodation: the 40-bed Bemrose Centre, the 44-bed Larch Hall and 10-bed Cameron Lair. In addition there is the Heather Lodge indoor hall and an indoor activity barn.

The site offers a number of activities including abseiling, archery, an assault course, climbing wall, mountain bikes, orienteering and shooting.

===== The Drum Hill Drummer =====
An urban legend among scouts and residents of the nearby village, Little Eaton, is that Drum Hill is haunted by a ghost called the 'Drum Hill Drummer' (sometimes referred to as 'The Drummer Boy'). The ghost is described to be a male child (aged from 9-14) that is covered in blood. The ghost is commonly seen running from tree to tree while distant drumming is heard. According to local folklore, you are most likely to encounter the ghost when walking the grounds at night, especially when the grounds are empty.

The story of the boy's death varies but follows the same pattern: centuries ago (around the English Civil War), the boy was taking part in some sort of military activity (either a battle or parade), when he fell from the cliff on the north side of the hill and severed his head on a jagged rock. Ever since, the boy has haunted the hill attempting to coerce people to the same fate.

==== Gradbach ====
Gradbach is a 48-acre (190,000 m^{2}) greenfield site located near the village of Flash, the UK's highest village between Leek and Buxton. It is located within the Peak District National Park and is on the border between Derbyshire and Staffordshire and close to the border of Cheshire. The site is technically in Staffordshire but has historical ties to Derbyshire Scouting since the site was purchased for the Buxton Scout Association c.1950. As well as large camping areas split over 20 camping sites, there are two indoor accommodation buildings available for hire, the 36-bed Farmhouse and the 16-bed Cottage.

The campsite is ideally situated for most Peak District activities including climbing, walking and caving and is a much used stopover point for Scout and Duke of Edinburgh's Award expeditions, as well as longer troop or patrol camps. The site organise the Border Hike, a 8-14 mile hike across the borders of the three counties for Scouts, Explorer Scouts and Guides.

==== Spitewinter ====
Spitewinter Scout Campsite is positioned on the edge of the Peak District National Park in Chesterfield and run by Chesterfield Scout District. The site has 4 acres (16,000 m^{2}) of sloping woodland with open camping areas, served by a purpose built ablution block, which has hot water and coin-operated showers. The site also has two wooden buildings, the Les Burt Hut and John Perry Hut, which serve as an indoor activity hall and a 26-bed accommodation building.

The site has an outdoor classroom, locations for open fire lighting and cooking, a bird hide for nature studies and a traversing wall. Additionally, caving, hiking, watersports, climbing and mountain biking are located nearby either following recommended routes in the Peak District or at nearby centres.

=== Leicestershire ===
Leicestershire has several campsites:

Fox Coverts is a campsite between Leicester and Hinckley, roughly 1 km from Kirkby Mallory. Fox Coverts has been Scout owned for almost 55 years, and is now managed by the Hinckley District Scout Council. Fox Coverts is a well equipped campsite with several camp sites in clearing, a main building "The Wilson Building", and many activity features.

Johns Lee Wood is a woodland campsite, in the North West Leicester Scout district near Markfield and Bradgate Park. The site has several activity facilities including a caving complex.

The Oaks is located close to Oaks in Charnwood with a variety of activities available.

Ullesthorpe campsite is in South Leicestershire, and was once the home of Leicestershire Scouts Training.

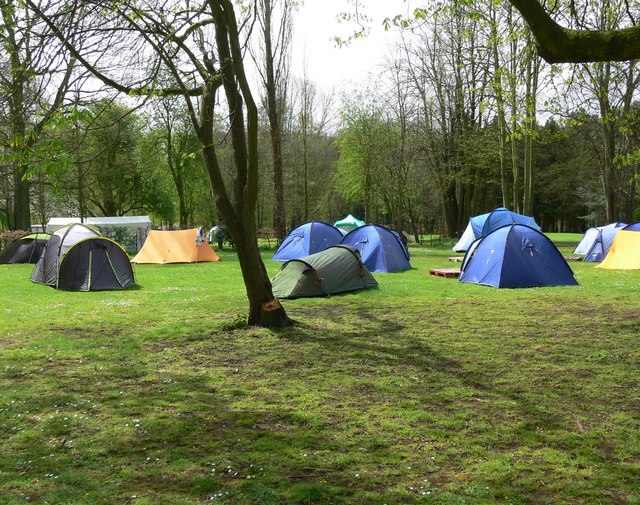
Willesley Scout camp in April 2008

Willesley is a Scout campsite that was once a stately home located 1-mile (1.6 km) south west of Ashby de la Zouch in North West Leicestershire. The site was bought by the local Scout District in 1952 along with a small area of land. Further land was later bought by the Scouts, with other areas becoming a fishing lake and a golf course. It occupies 14 acres (57,000 m^{2}) of the old Willesley Hall and estate from which part of the original gatehouse is still visible. The site, among many features, has its own church.

Holwell Pastures is a field campsite north of Melton Mowbray and managed by Melton District.

=== Lincolnshire ===
Lincoln Scout Association District has a camp site at Sudbrooke. Grantham Scout Association District runs the Dukes Covert Campsite.

The Stamford and Bourne District site at Shacklewell Hollow, on the A606 between Empingham and Stamford can camp up to 100 people in 4.5 acres (1.8 ha) of grassland and woods.

=== Northamptonshire ===
Northamptonshire Scout Association County owns Yr Hen Felin Cottage, a former Youth Hostel at Cynwyd, North Wales. It was purchased in 2007.

=== Nottinghamshire ===
There are a number of Scout camp sites in the County including:

- Hollygate Scout Camp
- Robin Hood Scout Campsite
- Sherbrooke Scout Campsite

== Gang Shows ==
There are several Gang Shows in this region.

- Nottingham Gang Show - started in 1951.
- Grimsby Gang Show, started in 1956.
- Northampton Gang Show - started in 1957 and celebrated its 50th show in 2009. (Due to a two-year gap)
- Kettering Gang Show - Performing its 56th Show from November 25-28th, 2015 at The Lighthouse Theatre.
- Derby Gang Show, (started before 1968) for Cubs, Scouts and Venture Scouts, for many years at the Odeon Theatre/Cinema.
- Derby East Gang Show also known as Flying High, started in 1968.
- Hinckley Gang Show, started in 1980.
- Wellingborough Gang Show - 25th birthday celebrated in 2010
- Deeping Gang Show, started 1987.
- North Nottinghamshire Gang Show - Started in 2009.
- Lincoln District Gang Show.
- South East Lincolnshire Gang Show started in 2011.
- Grantham Scout and Guide Gang Show

== See also ==
- Age Groups in Scouting and Guiding
- Scouting sections
- Neighbouring areas:
  - Scouting in South East England
  - Scouting in East of England
  - Scouting in West Midlands
  - Scouting in North West England
  - Scouting in Yorkshire and the Humber
- Girlguiding Midlands
- Girlguiding North East England
- Girlguiding Anglia
