= Scouting in Wales =

Scouting in Wales provides an overview of Scouting activities in Wales. Scout troops have existed in the country since 1908 with the largest number of Scouts and volunteer leaders today linked to the Scout Association of the United Kingdom. This is done through ScoutsCymru, the Welsh Scout Council who split the region further into four regions and a total of 12 Scout Areas. In addition to the Scout Association, there are also traditional Scouting groups belonging to the Baden-Powell Scouts' Association and a number of Scouting clubs within Universities which are affiliated to the Student Scout and Guide Organisation.

== The Scout Association: ScoutsCymru ==
ScoutsCymru
- Owner: The Scout Association
- Headquarters: Caerphilly
- Country: Wales
- Founded: 1925
- Membership: 19,000
- Chief Commissioner for Wales: Rhian Moore
- Youth Commissioner for Wales: Lowri Williams
- Chair: Pam Kelly
- Website scoutscymru.org.uk

ScoutsCymru, formerly known as ScoutsWales and the Welsh Scout Council, is the Country Scout Headquarters for Wales and supports the development of The Scout Association programme in the country. It was first established in 1925 and is distinct from the other country Scout headquarters as a number of matters are undertaken by the UK headquarters at Gilwell Park but does have a role in tailoring the Scout Association programme and message to Wales such as providing programme resources and support in the Welsh language in line with legislation. There are 14,000 young people and 5,000 adult volunteers in ScoutsCymru.

Prior to the formal establishment of the Welsh Scout Council, the appointment of Chief Scout of the Principality of Wales was held by Edward, Prince of Wales from 1911 and held this position until he became official patron of the Scout Movement across the British Empire on becoming King Edward VIII in 1936. The current name of ScoutsCymru was adopted on 1 March 2016, Saint David's Day, to reflect the pride of the Welsh roots of the organisation and to reflect a commitment to the culture of Wales.

ScoutsCymru has a similar organisational structure to England with four regions, 12 Scout Areas supporting local Scout districts and groups. The lead volunteer for Wales, the Chief Volunteer for Wales, leads Scouts Cymru and since 2018 this has been Rhian Moore. They are supported by a team of volunteers, collectively branded as TeamCymru, including a Youth Lead for Wales; a Trustee Board to govern the charity; and paid members of staff based at the headquarters in Caerphilly.

ScoutsCymru also operate a number of properties and sites that are available for other Scouts to use. This includes meeting rooms at their HQ in Caerphilly, the Yr Hafod mountaineering hostel in Snowdonia that is part of the Scout Adventures grouping and the Cornel Scout Centre in Snowdonia with indoor accommodation and camping space.

Scouts in Wales wear the same uniform as the wider Scout Association but with the addition of a badge showing the flag of Wales on each shoulder. Similarly, the ScoutCymru scarf design is red with green and white borders to match the flag of Wales. There are a number of badges and awards specific to Welsh Scouts which are awarded by ScoutsCymru HQ:

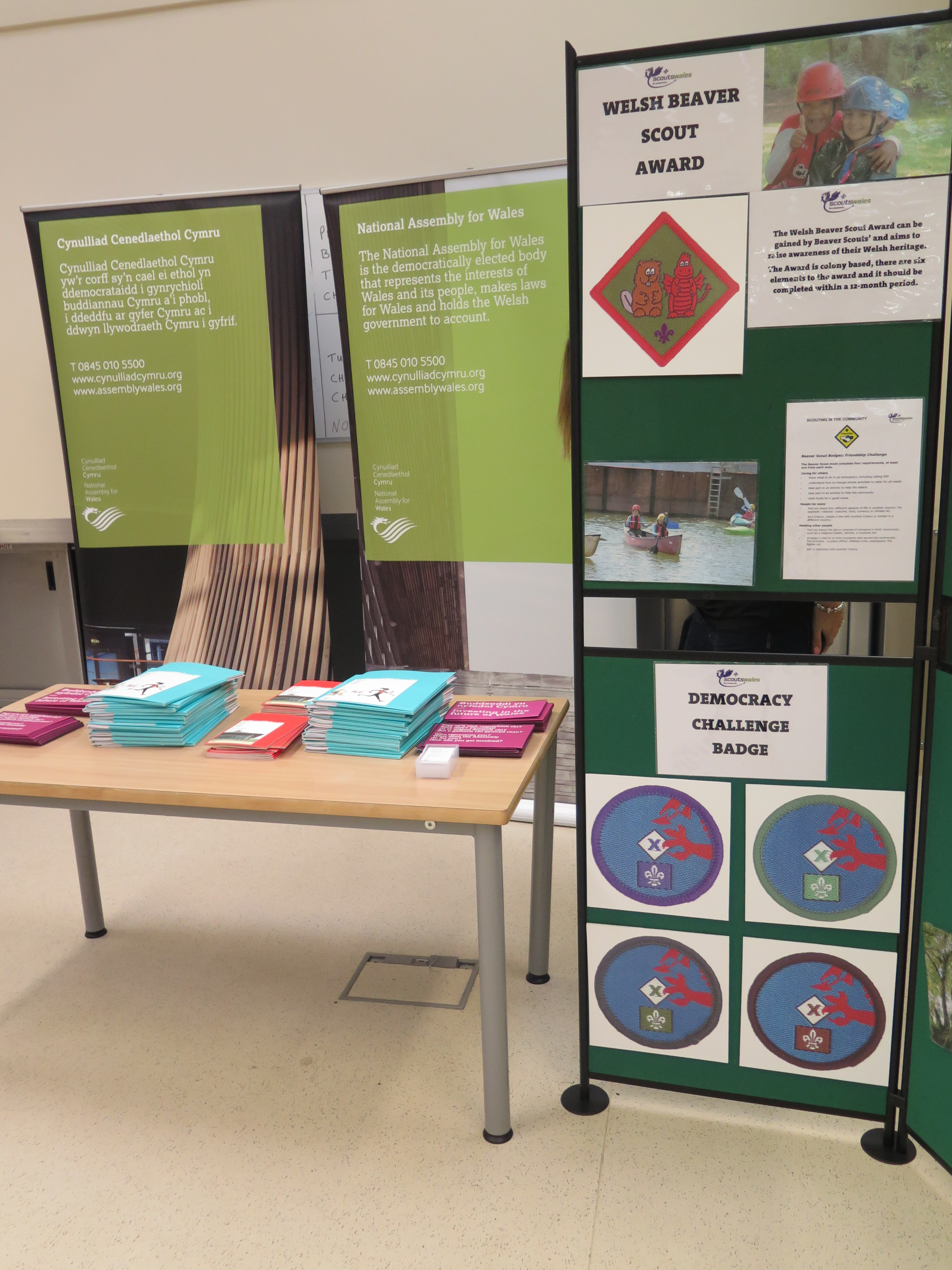
A display at the ScoutsWales AGM in 2016 showing some of the Welsh awards available.

- The Welsh Beaver, Cub and Scout Awards, one for each section, that raise awareness of Welsh heritage.
- Dragon Award, available in Bronze, Silver and Gold variations can be achieved by members in the Scouts, Explorers and Scout Network sections. Aims to promote outdoor nights away experiences in new and different locations and at different times of the year.
- Democracy challenge to raise awareness of the democratic processes within the section, the local community and at elections for the Welsh and UK Parliament. Produced in partnership with the Welsh Parliament and open to all sections.
- Rights Badge to raise awareness of children's rights and the role of the Children's Commissioner for Wales and produced in partnership with the Commissioner's office.
- Flood Awareness Badge for the Cub and Scouts sections to raise awareness of flooding and how it can be prevented. Produced in partnership with Natural Resources Wales.
- Internet Safety Award for each section produced in partnership with the Child Exploitation and Online Protection Command.

A number of events are organised on a Wales-wide basis coordinated by ScoutsCymru. Such events include Beaver Scout Leaders' Conference, Wales Cub Fun Day, All Wales Scout Camp and AWESOME.

=== Brecknock Scout Area ===
Brecknock Scout Area is located within the Powys Welsh Scout Region and covers an area approximate to the historic county of Brecknockshire. It includes much of the Brecon Beacons National Park and is rural in nature. It is led by an area commissioner, along with other volunteers at area and district levels. The area is split into three Scout districts that support the nine Scout groups in the area:

- Brecon & Glanusk including Crickhowell, Llangynidr and Llangors.
- Builth Wells in the North of the area including nearby Llanwrtyd Wells.
- Ystradgynlais in the South West corner of the area.

From early days of the movement, the area experienced strong growth through the influence of Baron Glanusk, who became the first Commissioner for Wales in 1912, and with the first Ystradgynlais troop established in 1908. Scouts marked the coronation of George VI and Elizabeth II in 1937 and 1953 respectively by lighting a beacon on Pen y Fan – a symbol that appears as the area badge for members' uniforms. Welsh Jamborees were celebrated in the area at Gwernyfed in 1961 and Glanusk in 1993.

=== Cardiff and Vale Scout Area ===
Cardiff and Vale Scout Area, located in the South Wales Region, is concurrent with the city of Cardiff and the county borough of the Vale of Glamorgan which includes the towns of Barry, Penarth, Llantwit Major, and Cowbridge. It is led by an area commissioner, along with other volunteers at area and district levels. As of January 2021, there are 2,600 members in the area. The area has a central office, called The Hub, in the Gabalfa community of Cardiff and offers meeting space, resources for leaders and a Scout shop run by a paid administrator. The area has around 4,000 members and is split into five districts and around 50 groups. These were last reorganised in 2017 and are:

- Cardiff East covering an area of the city roughly east of the railway line to Caerphilly including Cathays, Roath, Cyncoed and Trowbridge.
- Cardiff North covering the central north part of the city including Llanishen, Rhiwbina and Whitchurch.
- Cardiff West covering the area of the city west of the River Taff including Radyr, Llandaff, Ely and Grangetown.
- Penarth and District including Dinas Powys, Sully and Wenvoe.
- Tir a Môr (English: Land and Sea) covers the western Vale of Glamorgan including Barry, Cowbridge and Llantwit Major.

The Area runs and owns two campsites; Jubilee field which is based in the Vale of Glamorgan, and Miskin Mill Scout Village which is owned jointly with Mid Glamorgan Scout Area. Since the mid-1980s, the area has run a Scout Post system around Christmas time where Scouts sort and deliver Christmas cards as a fundraising activity and a way to engage the community.

The uniform badge used by the area and worn on the uniform of every member shows three chevrons pointing up and coloured differently in the two halves of the badge: white on a red background on the left and red on a gold background on the right, similar in style to that appearing on the coat of arms of both Cardiff and the Vale of Glamorgan.

==== 1st Cathays Al Huda ====
Located within the area, the 1st Cathays Al Huda Scout Group in Cardiff became the first Muslim Scout Group in Wales in 2006 and the tenth in the United Kingdom. Informal meetings of the Group started in 2002, prior to its official establishment in January 2006, growing from 61 members in 2006 to 98 in 2010. By 2018, they had 250 members making them one of the largest Muslim scout groups in the UK. They provide the full range of Scouting sections including separate sections for boys and girls.

==== Tŷ Hafan Scouts ====
Conceived in 2007 for the Centenary of Scouting and founded in 2008, Tŷ Hafan Scout Group provides scouting activities to the patients at the Tŷ Hafan children's hospice. They are the first hospice Scout group in the UK and emerged from the need to provide fun activities and experiences to the children with life limiting conditions including camping and activities with their families. The group do not charge patients for the activities, so costs for the activities and the Scouts membership fees are covered through fundraising.

==== Lord Mayor's Own Scouts ====
Run directly by the area, The Lord Mayor's Own Scout Troop is made up of Scouts from the area which have achieved the highest youth awards. Since 2003, this has been Scouts achieving the Chief Scout's Gold Award, the Chief Scout's Platinum Award, the Chief Scout's Diamond Award and the Queen's Scout Award. The troop support the Lord Mayor of Cardiff with ceremonies and civic events.

The group first emerged when the 14th Cardiff Scout Troop assisted with the rescue efforts at the Senghenydd colliery disaster in 1913 when their efforts were recognised by James Robinson, the Lord Mayor of Cardiff, he adopted the group and presented them some colours. When the group was disbanded in 1954, the colours were returned to the City Council and stored where they were uncovered in 1994 by the Lord Mayor Councilor Ricky Ormand who approached the Scouts to discover their story. The Lord Mayor's Own Scout troop was reformed in its current state in that year with members wearing a white necker bearing the coat of arms of the City of Cardiff.

=== Carmarthenshire Scout Area ===
Carmarthenshire Scout Area is located within the West Welsh Scout Region and covers an area roughly concurrent to the historic county of Carmarthenshire (the exception being Scout groups in Newcastle Emlyn which is administered by neighbouring Ceredigion Scout Area). It is led by an area commissioner, along with other volunteers at the area level to support scout groups directly as there are no districts within Carmarthenshire.

The 1st Carmarthen Scout Group is notable within the area as one of the founding troops registered with the Scout Association in 1908 while local records suggest another early Scout group in Llanelli founded in 1908.

=== Ceredigion Scout Area ===
Ceredigion Scout Area is located within the West Welsh Scout Region and covers an area roughly concurrent to the principal area of Ceredigion and includes around 600 members. It is led by an area commissioner, along with a team of 8 volunteers at the area level to support scout groups and districts. The area is split into two districts:

- North Ceredigion including Aberystwyth.
- Teifi covering the southern part of the area and named for the River Teifi that forms the southern border of the area.

The area has a lengthy history of Scouting with records existing in the Ceredigion Archives for the Aberystwyth Local Scout Association in April 1910.

=== Clwyd Scout Area ===
Clwyd Scout Area is located within the North Welsh Scout Region and covers an area largely equal to the preserved county of Clwyd, specifically the boroughs of Denbighshire, Flintshire and Wrexham, in the North East of Wales. The area has around 2,200 Scouts and a further 800 adults and is led by an area commissioner along with a team of volunteers at the area level to support the Scout districts and the approximately 60 scout groups. The area is split into four districts:

- Flintshire
- Llangollen includes the areas of the counties of Denbighshire and Wrexham around the town of Llangollen including Corwen and Chirk.
- Vale of Clwyd covering the remaining areas of Denbighshire including Rhyl and Prestatyn.
- Wrexham

The former national Scout camp of Brynbach, which was used since the 1930s, transferred to headquarters in December 1948 and closed in September 1952, is situated in Denbighshire near the village of Saron.

=== Eryri Y Mon Scout Area ===
Eryri Y Mon Scout Area (English: Snowdonia and the Isle of Anglesey) is located within the North Welsh Scout Region and covers an area concurrent with the preserved county of Gwynedd, the borough of Conwy and the island of Anglesey. It also covers the Snowdonia National Park and is led by an area commissioner. The area is split into three districts following local authority boundaries:

- Conwy
- Gwynedd
- Ynys Môn (English: Isle of Anglesey) and sometimes shortened to ScoutsMôn.

The Gwynedd Archives Service holds records of Scouts in the area as early as 1911 with records of Scouts in Anglesey, Caernarfonshire and Merionethshire. Local newspaper records identify the 1st Colwyn (YMCA) as being founded in May 1908.

=== Glamorgan West Scout Area ===
Glamorgan West Scout Area is covers an area equal to the City and County of Swansea and county borough of Neath Port Talbot. The area is split into three districts:

- Afan Nedd covers the county borough of Neath Port Talbot and is named jointly for the River Afan and Neath which translates as Castell-nedd in Welsh.
- Cwm Newydd covers the northern suburbs of Swansea including Loughor, Morriston, Fforestfach and Pontarddulais.
- Swansea and Gower

Notable in the district for its history is the 1st Swansea Sea Scouts which were founded in July 1913 with help from Captain Heneage of Parc le Breos. 60 members of the troop would end up fighting in World War I with 6 dying in that conflict; their names are all recorded in a memorial in the West Glamorgan Archives.

=== Gwent Scout Area ===
Gwent Scout Area is located within the South Welsh Scout Region and covers much of the preserved county of Gwent. It covers the county boroughs of Blaenau Gwent, Monmouthshire, Torfaen and the City of Newport. It is led by an area commissioner, along with other volunteers at area and district levels. The area is split into four Scout districts which follow the council boundaries:

- Blaenau Gwent has groups in the towns of Abertillery, Blaina, Brynmawr, Ebbw Vale, Tredegar and the villages of Beaufort and Cwm.
- Monmouthshire has groups across the district including the towns of Abergavenny, Caldicot, Chepstow and Usk.
- Newport
- Torfaen with groups in Blaenavon, Cwmbran and Pontypool.

The area has a long history of Scouting with groups in the area by 1910 and the first recorded decision to establish a troop in May 1908. Records of these exist through newspaper records and minute books from trustees dating back to 1927. Notable in the area is the 25th Newport Air Scouts, who are the only Royal Air Force recognised Scout troop in Wales. The area runs a series of regular events including Gwentrek, an expedition challenge for Scouts and Explorer Scouts.

The area has a campsite at Botany Bay in the Wye Valley.

=== Mid Glamorgan Scout Area ===
Mid Glamorgan Scout Area is located within the South Welsh Scout Region and is named for the preserved county of Mid Glamorgan. It covers the county boroughs of Bridgend, Caerphilly, Merthyr Tydfil and Rhondda Cynon Taf. It is led by an area commissioner, along with a team of 16 volunteers at area and district levels. The area is split into four Scout districts which follow the council boundaries:

- Bridgend including the towns of Bridgend, Maesteg, Pencoed and Porthcawl.
- CRAI serves the Caerphilly County Borough, with its name serving as an initialism of Caerphilly, Rhymney Valley And Islwyn.
- Merthyr Tydfil serves the town of the same name as well as Aberfan, Treharris and Troed-y-rhiw.
- Rhondda Cynon Taf including Aberdare, Pontypridd, Porth, Tonypandy and Treorchy.

=== Montgomeryshire Scout Area ===
Montgomeryshire Scout Area is named for the historic county of the same name and sits as the Northern section of the principal area and preserved county of Powys and the Powys Welsh Scout Region. It is rural in nature and has a single district serving the nine groups in locations including in the main towns of Llanidloes, Machynlleth, Montgomery, Newtown and Welshpool. It is led by an area commissioner along with a team of 12 volunteers including a district commissioner.

=== Pembrokeshire Scout Area ===
Pembrokeshire Scout Area serves the county and principal area of the same name and is part of the West Welsh Scout Region. It is led by an area commissioner, along with a team of volunteers to support the local Scouting groups and sections. It has a single district serving the groups in the towns of Goodwick, Haverfordwest, Milford Haven, Narberth, Pembroke and Pembroke Dock as well as the villages of Johnston and Kilgetty.

=== Radnor Scout Area ===
Radnor Scout Area is located within the Powys Welsh Scout Region and covers an area approximate to the historic county of Radnorshire. It is led by an area commissioner along with a team of volunteers to support the local Scouting groups and sections and is organised into a single Radnor Scout district.

== Baden-Powell Scouts' Association ==
Within Wales there is also a presence of Scout Groups affiliated to the Baden-Powell Scouts' Association who follow the traditional Scouting methods. They share the history of the Scout Association until 1970 when they split to continue following the traditional Scouting method and programme as a result of the changes suggested by The Chief Scout's Advance Party Report.

== Student Scout and Guide Organisation (SSAGO) ==
There are five Scouting clubs at universities across the country all affiliated to the Student Scout and Guide Organisation (SSAGO). These clubs are based at Aberystwyth University (AberSSAGO), Bangor University (Bangor BUGS), Swansea University (SUGS), University of South Wales (SSAGO USW) and Cardiff SSAGS which covers Cardiff University, Cardiff Metropolitan University, University of Wales and Royal Welsh College of Music & Drama.

== Campsites ==
There is a large number of Scout campsites within Wales serving youth groups in a variety of settings. Due to the mountainous nature of many rural areas in the country, there are a number of centres clustered in some areas of the country including some owned and run by Scouting organisations from outside the area.

=== Clwyd ===
The preserved county of Clwyd contains a number of campsites including Cornel Scout Centre owned and run by ScoutsCymru and centres owned by local Scouts. Clwyd Scout Area run the Cae Llwyd greenfield campsite near Ruabon Moors and the Gladstone centre which includes an indoor centre and campsite facilities. Additionally, the Wrexham Scout district within the area run the Cox Wood campsite, the Rowallan Scout campsite and hall is owned by the 1st Hope Scout Group and the Chirk Bunkhouse, which beds 24, is owned and run jointly by Chirk Scouts and Girlguiding. The Northampton Scouts owned Yr Hen Felin Activity and Mountain Centre and the Conwy Scouts owned Rowen Campsite are also located in the county.

==== Cornel ====
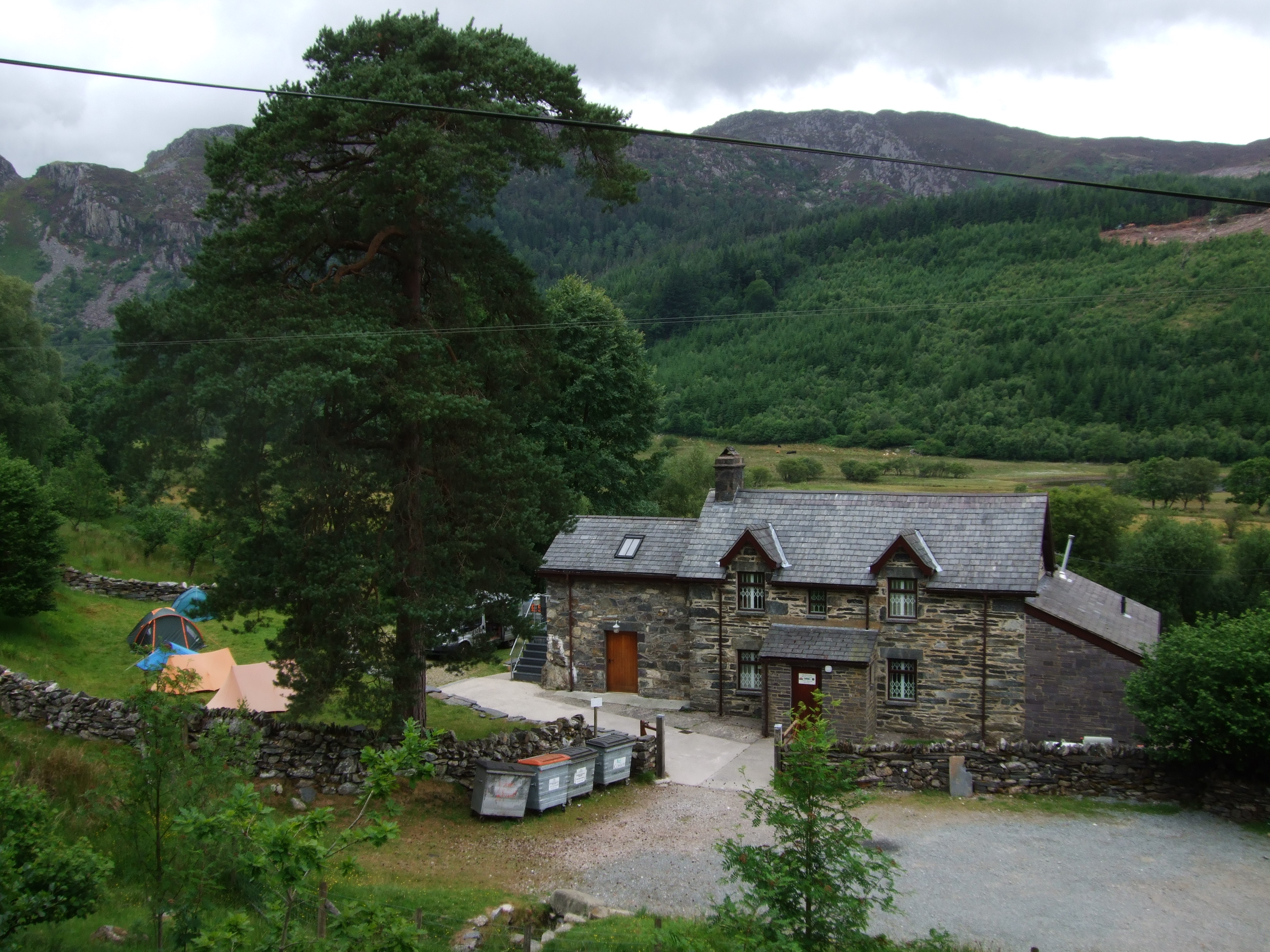
Cornel Scout Centre, showing the house on the right and the extension annex on the left of the building.

Located on the banks of Llyn Crafnant, high above the Conwy valley, Cornel Scout Centre is a 25-acre site owned by ScoutsCymru and run by a team of volunteers. The site contains an indoor scouting centre (comprising the house and the annex) that sleeps 30 and an outdoor campsite area that has camping space for a further 30 young people. It is limited in the activities it provides on site due to its size but does offer pioneering and backwoods cooking activities; it is however a useful base for hillwalking nearby and for boating on lakes nearby.

==== Cox Wood ====
Owned by the Wrexham Scout District and located between the town and Chester, Cox Wood Scout Campsite includes a number of clearings within an ancient woodland setting. In addition, the site also has two indoor lodges housing kitchens and dining areas, indoor classroom for training and activities and an outdoor activity shelter. The site contains a wide range of activities including climbing, abseiling, bouldering, adventure playground, crate stacking, pedal go carts, archery and rifle shooting.

==== Gladstone ====
The Clwyd Scout Area run The Gladstone Centre, a campsite and indoor centre located between Hawarden and Broughton. The site has a number of camping sites bordering woodland and two centres: an indoor training centre and a bunkhouse offering indoor accommodation. The site also has a few onsite activities including pioneering, abseiling and orienteering as well as being well placed for activities based on the nearby area.

==== Rowen ====
Gwersyll Parc Mawr, often referred to by its location as Rowen campsite is a 2-acre split level campsite and building located near Rowen, Conwy and partly named for the Parc Mawr ancient woodland to the north. It was gifted to the Conwy Scout District in 1931 by Dr W H Tattershall of Conwy and was notable until World War II as the only adult training centre for Mid and North Wales. The camp building on site has 6 beds, a kitchen and multi-purpose hall for indoor activities.

==== Yr Hen Felin ====
Located in Cynwyd, Denbighshire, Yr Hen Felin Activity and Mountain Centre (English: The Old Mill) is an activity centre owned by Northampton Scout District. Purchased in 2005 and opened in 2006, the site used to be the Cynwyd Youth Hostel run by the Youth Hostels Association (YHA) from the 1930s until the decision to sell it off in 2005 due to low usage and high costs required to bring it up to modern standards.

The centre is focused on the former hostel, which sleeps 30, and a camping area outside ideal for expeditions. Activities offered include pioneering, canoeing, bouldering and mountain based activities.

=== Dyfed ===
The preserved county of Dyfed contains two Scout campsites. The Carmarthenshire Scout Area is responsible for the Cwm Rhaeadr Scout Camp (English: Valley of the Waterfall) near Llandovery, which also goes by the name Rhandyrmwyn. Located in the Natural Resources Wales forest of the same name, the site has access to walking routes and a mountain biking trail in the woodland. It is a predominantly back to basics campsite with space for 100 campers but also contains two camping barns with 24 beds and no kitchen to promote backwoods cooking.

The Pembrokeshire Scout Area runs St Bride's Scouting Campsite in St Brides near Haverfordwest. The site is located in the Pembrokeshire Coast National Park as part of a former orchard on the edge of the St Brides Castle estate. While the site has no on-site activities, it does have camping space for approximately 60 people and two cottages on the site for indoor use.

=== Gwent ===
The Gwent preserved county is home to one scout centre, the Botany Bay Training and Activity Centre run by Gwent Scout Area and located in the Wye Valley near Tintern. The 27-acre mostly wooded site has a large camping field, indoor activity and training spaces and cabins for accommodation. Activities on the site are primarily limited to traditional scouting activities although some other activities and visit locations are available off-site nearby.

=== Gwynedd ===
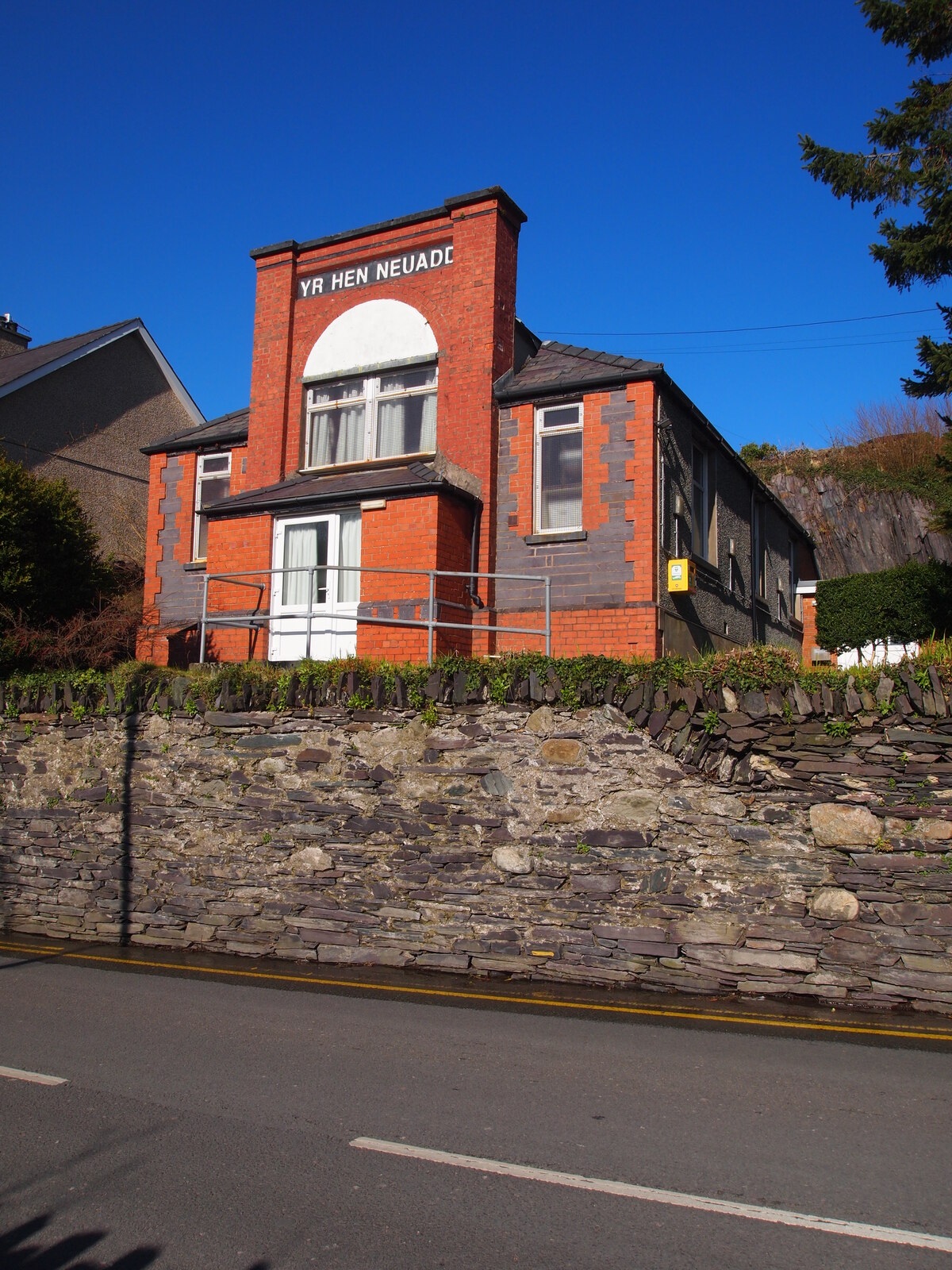
Yr Hen Neuadd, Bethesda.

The Gwynedd county has half a dozen scout centres, grouped in the north of the county towards the top of the Snowdonia National Park including the only Scout Adventures centre in Wales. A number of these are owned and run by Scout organisations outside of Wales, primarily as bases for hillwalking in the surrounding area: the 38 bed Old School Lodge in Deiniolen is owned by Wallasey & West Wirral Scout Districts; the 36 bed Clogwyn Centre in Port Penrhyn owned by Mersey Weaver Scout District and includes an indoor climbing wall; and the 30 bed Yr Hen Neuadd (English: The Old Hall) centre located in Bethesda which was converted from a Salvation Army hall in 1970 by Greater London South West Scout County.

Scouts also have access to the Clwt-y-Bel 18 bed bunkhouse near Deiniolen owned by the Shrewsbury Mountaineering Club and the 34 bed Coetmor Mill Bunk House near Bethesda. It was formerly a water mill that was disused by the late 19th century before being converted to a bunkhouse by Hertfordshire Scout County in the late 1960s and used as their mountain centre until the surrendered the lease in 2016; the centre is now owned by the Coetmor Mill Trust.

==== Yr Hafod ====
Located in Nant Ffrancon Pass, Snowdonia, Yr Hafod (English: Summer house) is owned by ScoutsCymru and run as part of the national Scout Adventures grouping. It was opened in 1959 by Bill Tilman, it consists of a single 32 bed lodge with no camping area. It offers crag climbing, hill walking and hiking in the surrounding mountains and runs a significant number of mountaineering training courses each year. It is also a base for expeditions, particularly for parties undertaking their Duke of Edinburgh's Award.

=== Mid Glamorgan ===
The preserved county of Mid Glamorgan houses three Scout campsites primarily owned by the Scout Areas within the county. Miskin Mill Scout Village near Llantrisant is jointly run by Cardiff and The Vale and Mid Glamorgan Scout Areas, while the latter also run the Plas Dolygaer campsite and 36 bed accommodation centre near Pontsticill as their mountain training centre. The CRAI Scout District covering Caerphilly owns the CRAI Scout Activity Park near Newbridge.

==== CRAI Scout Activity Park ====
Located near Newbridge, CRAI Scout Activity Park (alternatively known as Islwyn Scout Parc) is owned by the Scout district of the same name. Open to all youth groups, the centre includes camping space for 300 people, a lodge containing training space and 16 beds and an activity centre with climbing, abseiling and bouldering walls. The site also hosts archery, tomahawk throwing, rifle shooting, canoeing and kayaking.

==== Miskin Mill ====
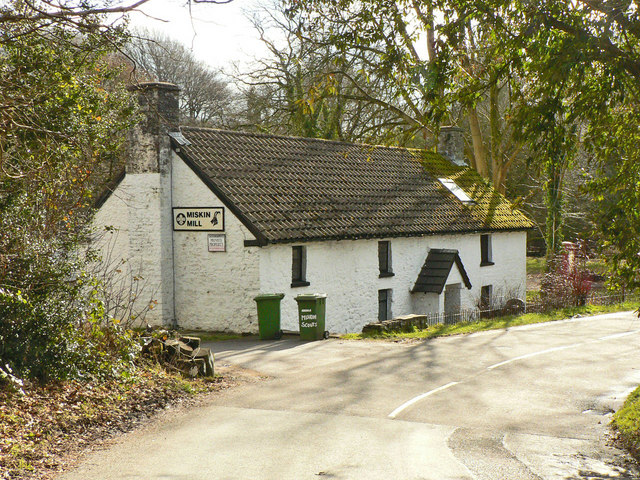
Miskin Mill Scout Village.

Located near Llantrisant, Miskin Mill Scout Village is a Scout centre and campsite owned and run jointly by the Mid Glamorgan and Cardiff and Vale Scout Areas. It is based around a historic Water Mill from 16th Century which has been used by the Scouts since 1929, initially owned by the Welsh Scout Council and since 1985 the two Scout areas. The 3-acre site contains camping space as well as a series of buildings on site: the mill itself offering indoor activity space and dining facilities, the 32 bed lodge accommodation building and the cottage containing an activity room and kitchen. As well as being ideally placed for local attractions, the site offers archery, shooting, laser tag, pioneering and crate stacking on site.

=== Powys ===
While some Scout headquarters are available to rent as smaller campsites the primary campsite in the preserved county is Gwersyll Bryniau, the area campsite owned and run by the Montgomeryshire Scout Area. Located north of Machynlleth, the site consists of a 4-acre camping field and 20 acres of woodland and offers basic activities such as pioneering and walking locally.

=== South Glamorgan ===
Cardiff and The Vale Scout Area own and are responsible for Jubilee Campsite, a small campsite in Peterston-super-Ely offering basics camping and on-site target activities.

=== West Glamorgan ===
The preserved county of West Glamorgan has a number of centres including Silver Cross Scout Centre near Morriston, the Cadoxton campsite near Neath and the Moorlakes Wood and Parc-le-Breos greenfield campsites which are both on the Gower Peninsula with the latter run by Swansea and Gower Scout District. Swansea Marina is also the home of the MAST Centre, short for Marine Activity Scout Training Centre, which offers water activities and can be used for indoor accommodation.

==== Cadoxton ====
The Neath Scout Activity Centre, or more formally the John Leitz Training Ground, is located in Cadoxton, Neath on the edge of the Craig Gwladys Country Park. The site offers camping across two fields, and has a main hall that includes space for activities, dining, meetings and a 6-bed bunk room and provision for more sleeping in the main hall.

==== Silver Cross ====
Glamorgan West Scout Area is responsible for Silver Cross Scout Centre near Llangyfelach, Swansea. The 15-acre mostly wooded site has been running as a Scout campsite since 1951 and is run by a volunteer team offering camping and indoor accommodation and activity space suitable for 40 people. The site has a climbing and abseiling wall, archery and rifle shooting ranges, adventure course and offers crate stacking, paintball, laser tag and tomahawk throwing.

== Gang Shows ==
There are two Gang Shows in Wales:- Cardiff and Newport.

== Scout Bands ==
It was estimated by Gilwell park, that during the late 1950s, there was around 50 marching band associated with Scouting in Wales. These numbers rapidly decreased in the early 1990s and today only one marching band is associated with Scouting in Wales – 1st Rogerstone Scout Band.

The 1st Rogerstone Scout Band was formed in 1957 by Ramon O'brien, who continued, as bandmaster, until his death in January 2012. Ramon played with the Newport District Scout Band and continued to play in both until Newport District Scout band ceased to exist. It is a 'Group Band' however it has members from all over the Newport Scout District. The band was formed quite by chance, as someone offered Ramon some second hand drums they no longer had the space for, and the band was born. The band has included members that have gone onto play for The Parachute Regiments Corps of Drums. It has played a major part in Rogerstone's Remembrance Day Parade as well as Newport District's annual St George's Day Parade. In February 2012, Gavin Foley and Jonathan Gibbons took over the band as Band Master and Assistant Band master, and have subsequently added new music and instruments, to the existing line up. In the summer of 2012, Andy Watson joined the leadership team as Director of Music

== See also ==
- Scouting sections
- Neighbouring areas:
  - Scouting in North West England
  - Scouting in West Midlands
  - Scouting in South West England
- Girlguiding Cymru
