= Scouting in West Midlands =

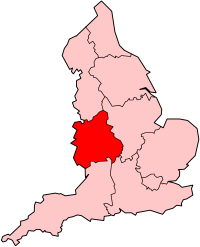

Scouting in West Midlands provides an overview of Scouting activities in the governmental region of the West Midlands. The largest number of Scouts and volunteer leaders in the region is linked to the Scout Association of the United Kingdom, while there is also a presence of traditional Scouting groups, such as the Baden-Powell Scouts' Association. The Scout Association administers the region through 8 Scout Counties, overseen by a regional commissioner, which follow the boundaries of the ceremonial counties they exist within. There are also a number of Scouting clubs within Universities in the region which are affiliated to the Student Scout and Guide Organisation.

The region hosted the 9th World Scout Jamboree, which celebrated the 50th Anniversary of Scouting in 1957, was held at Sutton Park, Birmingham. There were 30,000 participants, was combined with the 6th World Rover Moot with 3,500 participants and the 2nd World Scout Indaba. The event was visited by Queen Elizabeth II, the first time a reigning monarch had visited a jamboree, and also received visits from Prince Philip, Duke of Edinburgh and the Prime Minister Harold Macmillan.

== The Scout Association Counties ==
=== Birmingham Scout County ===
Birmingham Scout County is concurrent with the City of Birmingham in the ceremonial county of the West Midlands, and provides Scouting opportunities for 5,400 young people in the area led by 2,200 volunteers. The county is led by a volunteer management team of around thirty volunteers and led by the County Commissioner - as of 2024, Steve Thomas. The county is based out of an office in the city centre, where they provide a meeting facility for groups, but also runs two activity centres near Bromsgrove and a County Scout Shop in the St. George and St. Chad district North of the city centre. There are also some County level organisations such as a Climbing team, Mountaineering unit, hillwalking team and two water activity teams to lead these activities with Scouts from the county. Scouts in Birmingham is currently divided into six Scout Districts to manage the 98 Scout Groups locally and run the older Scout sections:

- Cole Valley South, named for the River Cole, and covering the South East of Birmingham.
- Rea Valley, named for the River Rea, and covering the South West of Birmingham.
- Spitfire, named after the aircraft previously built at Castle Bromwich in the district, and covering the North East of the city.
- Sutton Coldfield East
- Sutton Coldfield West
- Tame Valley, named after the River Tame and covering the North of the city.

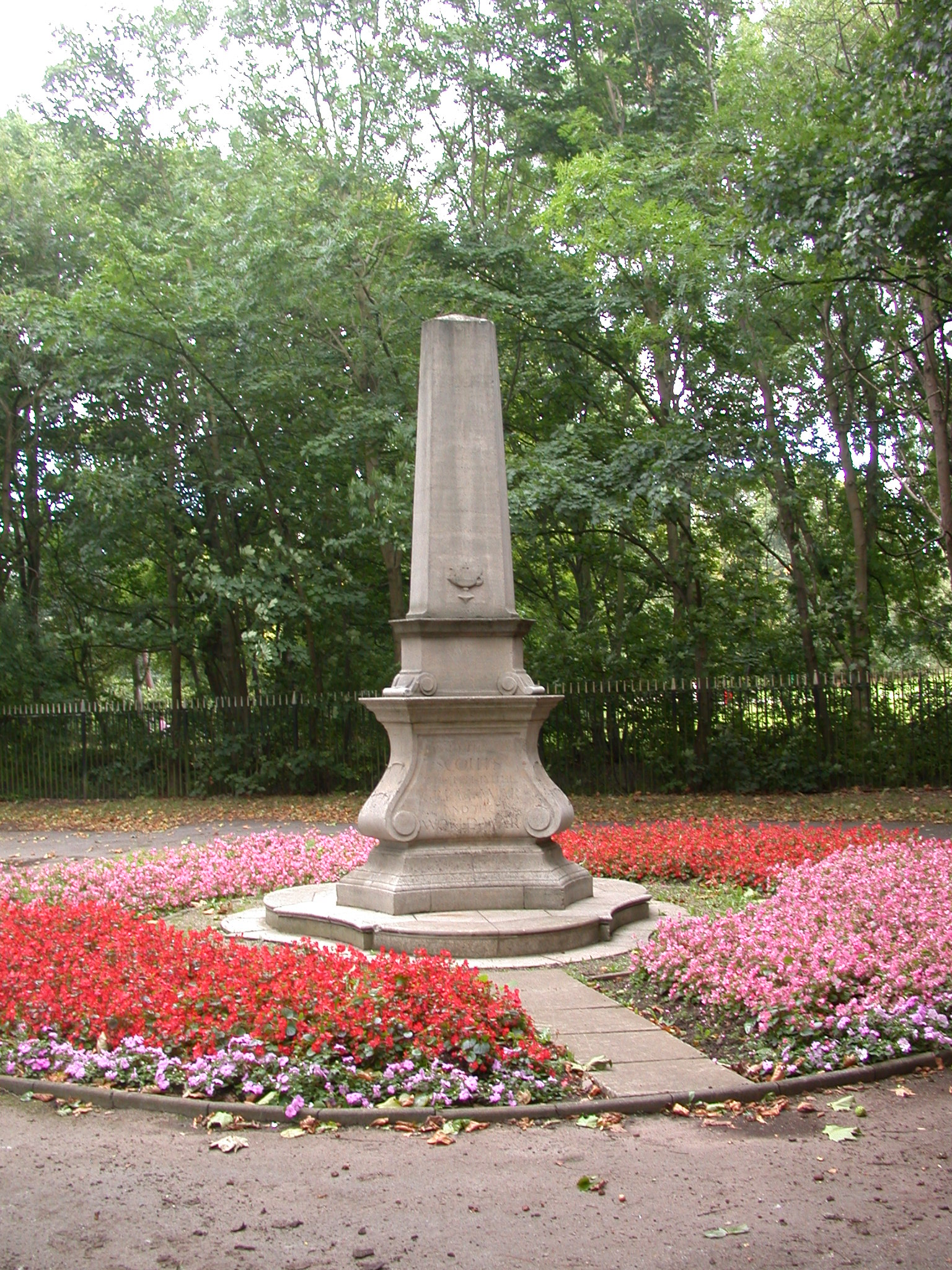
The Boy Scouts War Memorial in Cannon Hill Park.

Scout groups have a long history in the city with the 24th Birmingham/1st Sparkhill, 1st Bishops Latimer (107th Birmingham Central) and 84th Birmingham (Somerset Road Methodist Wesleyan) are listed as some of the founding troops of 1908.

The impact of World War I on the movement in Birmingham was great and in 1921 funds were raised by the Old Scouts Association in Birmingham to create a memorial; this took the form of an avenue of trees, one for each Scout lost, and a monument at the end which was unveiled in Cannon Hill Park in 1924. It was Grade II listed in 2016.

Since 1923 the county has run a permanent campsite near to the city to allow for adventurous activities and nights away experiences. This was initially at Yorks Wood: an 80-hectare (200-acre) site to the west of the city with five camping fields, a training centre, guest accommodation and a swimming pool. This was closed in 1972, as the land surrounding the campsite became more developed and urban in nature, and replaced with Blackwell Court with the open areas of Yorks Wood being developed and the woodland becoming a nature reserve in the 1990s.

In more recent years, the county has focused in reaching new diverse areas of membership; the first Muslim Scout Group in Birmingham was formed in February 2005 and Muslim Scouts from Birmingham were among those from the UK on the first official trip to Mecca for the Hajj in January 2006.

The County runs a number of regular events for members within the County including BrumVenture, an annual activity badge weekend for Scouts, a winter camp called iceSCOUT and the Birmingham Bivouac survival skills weekend, held annually for the past 44 years. In addition the county has run regular international expeditions to Kandersteg International Scout Centre in Switzerland approximately every 2 years and to the World Scout Jamboree every four years.

The county's badge, worn on the uniform of any member in the county, depicts the full Coat of arms of Birmingham.

Notable county commissioners of the Birmingham Scouts include Lord Hampton (from 1912 to 1927) and Peter F. Bennett (from 1934 to 1939).

==== More In Common ====
Birmingham Scout County along with Girlguiding Birmingham and the Jo Cox Foundation to run the More In Common badge to encourage Scouts and Guides to show compassion, kindness and friendship to others and to reach out to the wider diverse community. Members are encouraged to complete a series of activities to encourage pride in their city, community impact work, environmental changes and spiritual reflection. The badge was launched in November 2020 as part of the Birmingham Council of Faith's Interfaith Week and included a number of references to the then ongoing Coronavirus pandemic.

=== City of Coventry Scout County ===
The City of Coventry Scout County is concurrent with the city of Coventry in the ceremonial county of the West Midlands and provides young people with the Scout Association programme through 3 districts and approximately 30 Scout groups. The county is led by a volunteer management team of around 10 volunteers and additional trustees covering all aspects of the county's activities. Since April 2021, the county has been led by Michelle Cox who acts as the County Commissioner. The county is currently divided into three Scout Districts:

- Bablake, covering the West of the city and named after the independent school of the same name.
- Caludon, covering the North and East of the city and named after Caludon Castle.
- Charterhouse covering the South of the city and named after The Charterhouse.

The county's badge, worn on the uniform of any member in the county, depicts the full coat of arms of Coventry City Council and which is adopted as the wider coat of arms of the city.

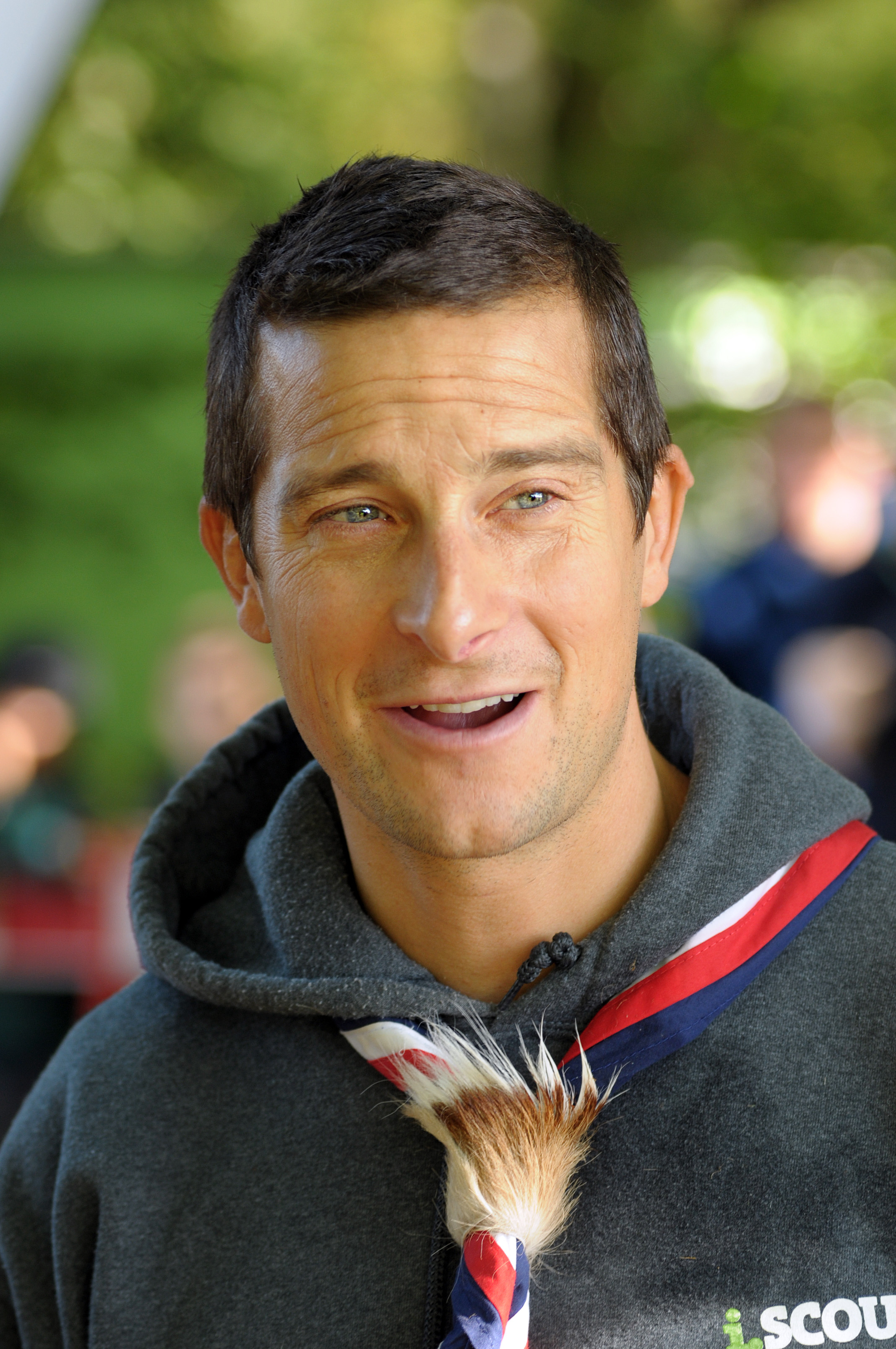
Bear Grylls, Chief Scout on a visit to Scouts in Coventry in 2012.

The county received a visit from Chief Scout of the UK, Bear Grylls, during a Bear in the Air tour when he visited the County Challenge Day in 2012 at the Rough Close Scout Activity Centre, run by the county.

The 13th City of Coventry Scout Group is notable in the county as the origins of both the notable Scout band, listed below, but also the Coventry Saracens Rugby Football Club which was originally formed in 1966 from the group.

==== 13th City of Coventry Scout Band ====
Notable in the county is the 13th City of Coventry Scout Marching Band, founded in 1929 and which rose to prominence after becoming supreme champions at the inaugural National Scout Band championships in May 1965. They would go on to win another four times consecutively and have since had 34 Royal performances, appearing in events and venues such as Westminster Abbey, Windsor Castle, St Paul's Cathedral, the Royal Tournament, Wembley Stadium, Royal Albert Hall, Royal Festival Hall, London's Guild Hall, The Lord Mayor's Show, Horse Guards Parade, Coventry Cathedral, the Spalding Flower Parade, London's Easter Parade, and the Jersey Battle of Flowers. The leaders of the band have become well known and respected among Scout Bands across the UK with Roy Nowell MBE, a volunteer with the group, becoming a UK advisor on the topic for 25 years.

=== Hereford and Worcester Scout County ===
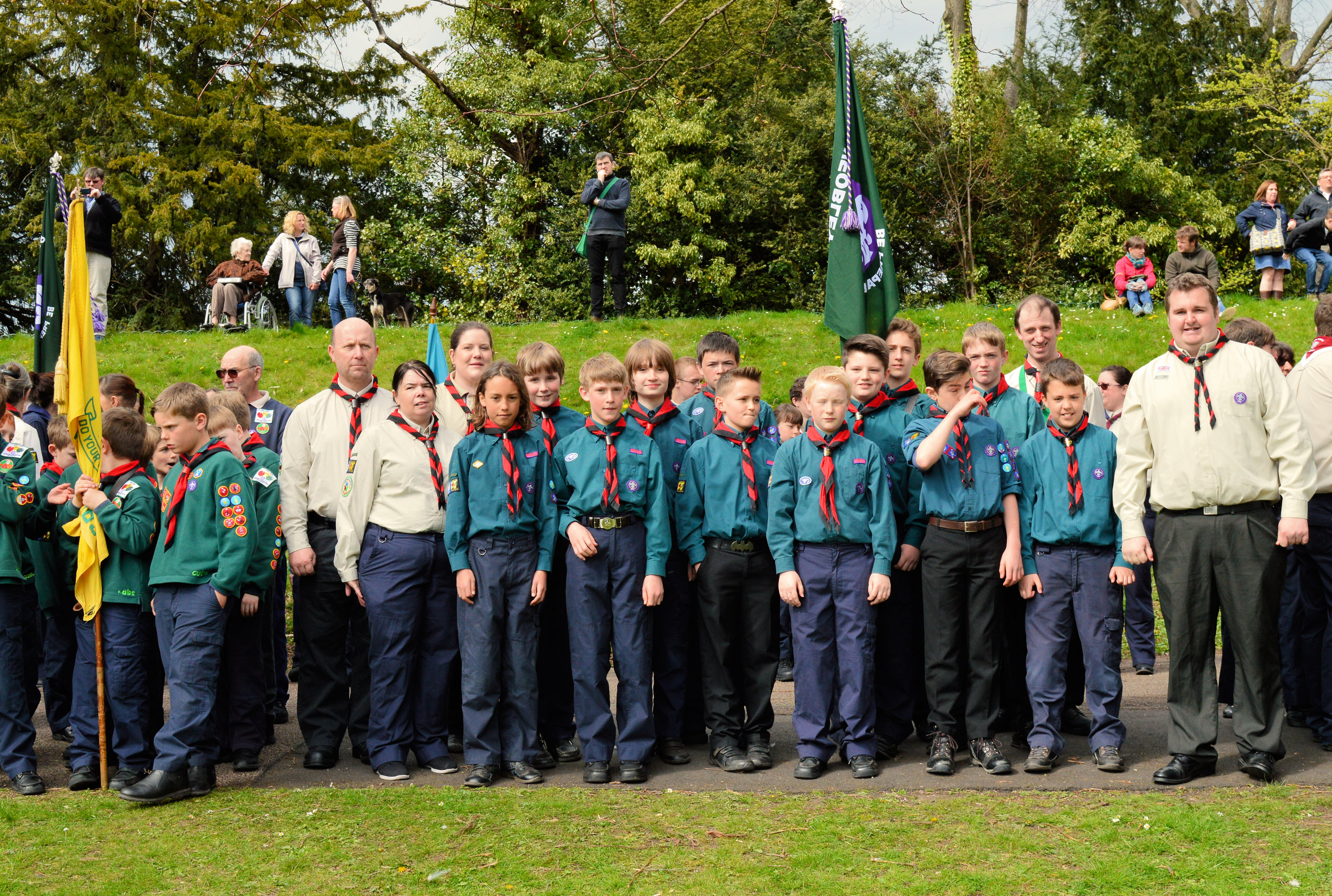
Scouts from Weobley pictures in April 2016.

Hereford and Worcester Scout County is the Scout Association county covering the ceremonial counties of Herefordshire and Worcestershire. The county has around 8,000 members including 5,500 Scouts. The county is led by the County Lead Volunteer. He is supported by a team of volunteers who run activities and events for over 5000 young people and by the County Youth Lead Volunteers who directly represent the younger members and help ensure the programme remains youth-led. The county is divided into nine districts which have changed a number of times, most recently in 2018:

- Avon Vale, covering the valley of the River Avon to the South West of Worcester including Evesham and Pershore.
- Bromsgrove including nearby Droitwich Spa and Hagley.
- Redditch
- Ross
- South Marches, referring to the Welsh Marches which border Wales. It covers all but the most southern and western areas of Herefordshire including the city of Hereford, the towns of Leominster and Kington.
- The Malverns covering the communities around the Malvern Hills on the Herefordshire and Worcestershire border.
- The Shire, covering the northern border between Herefordshire and Worcestershire.
- Worcester
- Wyre Forest covering Kidderminster, Bewdley and Stourport-on-Severn.

The 1st Malvern Link Scout Group is listed as one of the founding troops of 1908. The county has had the use of a campsite and activity centre at Kinver since 1921 and continues to maintain it for use by Scouts and other youth groups to this day.

The county has a number of clubs and groups that provide instruction and support for various adventurous activities including hill walking, climbing, water activities such as canoeing and kayaking and target sports such as archery and shooting. The county also runs events for its members including the three-yearly ShireJam for all youth sections and international expeditions such as to Nepal.

The county's badge, worn on the uniform of any member in the county, depicts a red apple on a yellow background and a yellow pear on a black background split diagonally. The apple is a symbol often linked to the county and features in the logo for Herefordshire County for example while the pear similarly has historic links to Worcestershire and appears on its county flag.

=== Shropshire Scout County ===
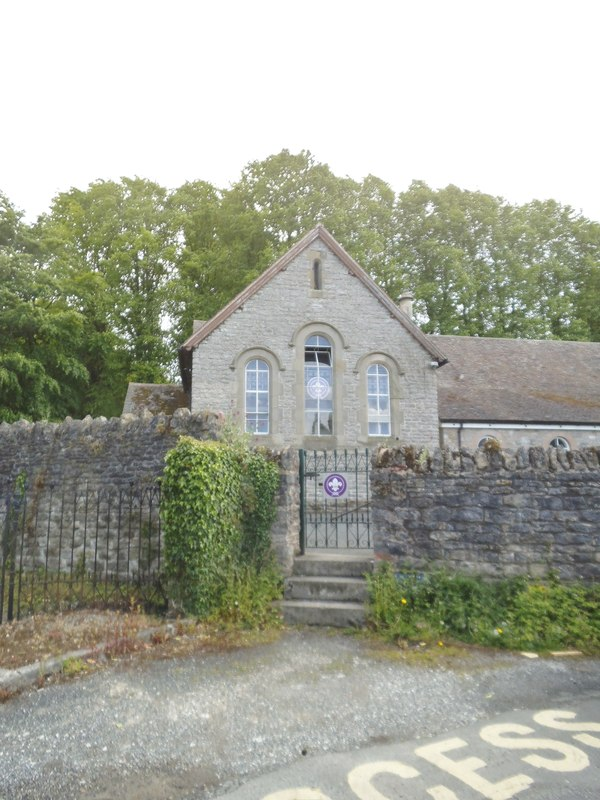
A Scout HQ in Much Wenlock.

Shropshire Scout County is the Scout Association county covering the ceremonial county of Shropshire and providing activities for 3,000 Scouts. The county's 500 volunteer leaders in around 50 groups is led by several volunteer teams covering the different areas of the county's activity and led by a County Commissioner, Dexter Williams. The county is divided into three districts:

- Shropshire Borders covering the North Western part of the County including Shrewsbury, Ellesmere and Oswestry.
- Shropshire Severn and Teme named for the rivers and covering the Southern part of the county and the southern part of the Telford and Wrekin borough area.
- Tern Valley covering the North East part of the County including the Northern part of the Telford and Wrekin borough area.

The county has a number of Scout Active Support groups and clubs that support the sections in various aspects of an adventurous programmes including clubs for archery, cave and mine exploration, climbing and abseiling, hillwalking and target shooting as well as running digital activities, facilitating the World Scout Jamboree and running the Andy Miles Centre for water sports activities. The 100th anniversary of the Scouting movement was celebrated in Shropshire on top of the Wrekin, near their County Camp Site, and in Ironbridge.

The county's badge, worn on the uniform of any member in the county, depicts the Coat of arms of Shropshire in a shield outline; a similar design is also on the Flag of Shropshire.

=== Solihull Scout County ===
Solihull Scout County is a Scout Association county concurrent in area with the Metropolitan Borough of Solihull in the ceremonial county of the West Midlands. It provides activities for over 2,500 young people and a further 600 adults spread across 24 Scout groups and 2 Scout districts. The county is managed by a team of volunteers and led by a County Lead Volunteer.

The county is split into two districts, Blythe and Cole both named after rivers in the district. Blythe district covers the town of Solihull and the suburbs around it while Cole covers the rural areas to the North and East of the borough including Knowle, Dorridge and Balsall Common. Both were formed on 1 April 2005 from the merger of two districts each; Blythe from the former Solihull East and West districts and Cole from the former Solihull North and South districts.

The county's badge, worn on the uniform of any member in the county, depicts the silhouette of an archer against a gold background. Scouts in Solihull take part in international expeditions including to Kandersteg International Scout Centre in Switzerland, Spain, Nepal, the Netherlands, Poland, America and recently Australian Jamboree 2025.

=== Staffordshire Scout County ===
Staffordshire Scout County is the Scout Association county covering most of the ceremonial county of Staffordshire including the city of Stoke-on-Trent but not including the villages within the southern salient. The county has approximately 10,000 members and is led by a team of volunteers including County Commissioner Jackie Brocklehurst. The county is split into 11 administrative districts:

- Burton upon Trent
- Cannock Chase named for the Area of Outstanding Natural Beauty.
- Lichfield
- Moorlands covering the area around Cheadle and Leek.
- Newcastle
- Potteries North covering the northern half of Stoke-on-Trent (Hanley, Burslem and Tunstall).
- Stafford
- Stone
- Tamworth
- Three Towns covering the three southernly towns of Stoke-on-Trent (Stoke-upon-Trent, Longton and Fenton).
- Uttoxeter

The 1st Hednesford Scout Group and the 13th Stoke-on-Trent & Newcastle (1st Alsager) Scout Group are listed as some of the founding troops of 1908. The county is based in a county office in Uttoxeter but also directly runs the Kibblestone International Scout Campsite, a 98-acre (400,000 m^{2}) camping and activity centre that is run as a district within the county structure. The county's badge, worn on the uniform of any member in the county, depicts the Stafford knot on a dark background - a symbol very commonly found in the county.

The county has a number of activity teams to develop and lead Scouts within the County in adventurous activities. These include an Air activities team, water sports and hill walking as well as assessors for activities such as caving, climbing and mountain biking. They have also run international expeditions to Ghana, Kandersteg International Scout Centre in Switzerland and Denmark.

=== Warwickshire Scout County ===
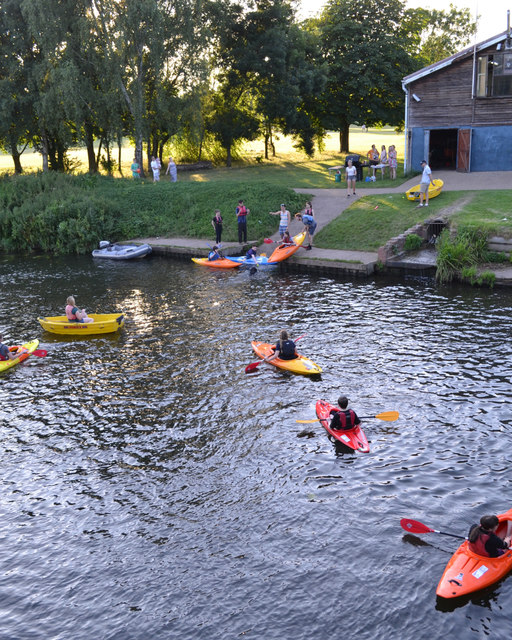
Warwick Sea Scouts taking part in Kayaking.

Warwickshire Scout County is the Scout Association county concurrent with the ceremonial county of Warwickshire and has approximately 7,000 members. The county is led by a number of volunteers, led by a County Commissioner which as of March 2021 is Nigel Hailey, and supported by an executive committee of 19 trustees. The county runs the Alfrey Scout Activity Centre, a 6-acre (24,000 m^{2}) site near the centre of the county for ease of access. The county is divided into eight Districts:

- Atherstone and the surrounding rural are in North Warwickshire including Coleshill and Meriden.
- Kenilworth
- Leamington
- Nuneaton covering the Nuneaton and Bedworth borough area.
- Rugby and some of the surrounding areas in the Borough of Rugby.
- Stratford-upon-Avon and nearby Bidford-on-Avon, Ettington and Shipston-on-Stour.
- Warwick
- West Warwickshire consisting of the Stratford-on-Avon borough that lies West of Stratford-upon-Avon and Warwick.

The county's badge, worn on the uniform of any member in the county, depicts the Bear and Ragged Staff long associated with the Earl of Warwick and subsequently used on the Coat of Arms and the Flag of Warwickshire. The version used on the badge shows the bear in a shield and with chains around them.

=== West Mercia Scout County ===
West Mercia Scout County is a Scout Association county concurrent in area with the Metropolitan boroughs of Dudley, Sandwell, Walsall and the city of Wolverhampton all within the ceremonial county of the West Midlands as well as the Southern salient of the ceremonial county of Staffordshire. Management and strategic direction for the county is provided through the leadership team of around 20 volunteers led by joint County Lead Volunteers, Lynn Richardson and James Steel, and additionally supported by trustees. The county is divided into eight Districts:

- Dudley
- Halesowen
- Sandwell
- Stourbridge covering the towns of Stourbridge, Kinver and the village of Bobbington
- Walsall covering the town and the area of the borough of Walsall.
- Wolverhampton East covering the communities to the South East of the borough.
- Wolverhampton North covering the communities in the North of the borough.
- Wolverhampton South covering the communities to the South West of the Borough, as well as the Southern salient of the ceremonial county of Staffordshire.

The county's badge, worn on the uniform of any member in the county, depicts a yellow Saxon crown above a Seax sword on a scarlet background. The 5th Wolverhampton Scout Group is listed as one of the founding troops of 1908.

==== Halesowen Scout Band ====
The Halesowen Scout Band
- Location: Halesowen, UK
- Conference: TYMBA
- Founded: 1975
- Website: www.halesowenscoutband.co.uk

The Halesowen Scout Band are a marching band based in the Halesowen district accepting members from groups across the area. Formed in 1975, they are members of TYMBA and compete in the National Class with competitions throughout the year.

Regular events the band participates at include parades on Remembrance Sunday, St George's Day, Girlguiding Thinking Day, fêtes and carnivals.

In April 2007, the band, joined by members of Spen Valley and Northampton, played at the St Georges Day Parade at Windsor Castle and was reviewed by Her Majesty The Queen.

== Baden-Powell Scouts' Association ==
The Baden-Powell Scouts' Association also operate a number of Scout Groups in the region and form part of the Mercia area of the association.

== Student Scout and Guide Organisation ==
There are two active student associations at various universities in the region, both affiliated to the Student Scout and Guide Organisation (SSAGO). The oldest of the two is Birmingham Universities Scouts and Guides (BUSAG) which covers the University of Birmingham, Aston University, Birmingham City University, Newman University, Birmingham and University College Birmingham. The other club in the region is Keele SSAGO based at Keele University in Staffordshire. A SSAGO Club previously existed at the University of Wolverhampton.

== Campsites ==
=== Herefordshire ===
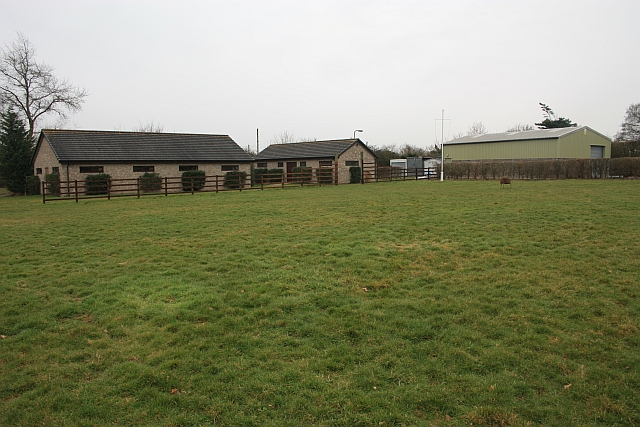
Warren Oak Campsite.

Warren Oak is a Scout campsite located in Staplow, 3 miles (4.8 km) NNW of the market town of Ledbury in Herefordshire. It is owned and run by The Malverns Scout District, part of the Hereford and Worcester Scout Association county and has been running since 1997. There is a building on-site for indoor activities and suitable for sleepovers and the wider site offers an assault course, pioneering and archery.

=== Shropshire ===
==== Bickley Coppice ====
Bickley Coppice is a 47-acre (190,000 m^{2}) wooded site on the banks of the River Severn. The majority of the facilities and camping areas are condensed into 7 acres (28,000 m^{2}) near to the entrance with the rest being woodland and nature reserve. It is mostly untouched woodland, making the site ideal for survival camps.

==== Wrekin ====
Wrekin Scout Camp is located on the south side of The Wrekin and is a simple campsite suited to backwoods camping and survival camps. It dates back to the 1940s but received support from other organisations in developing the place including a chapel being built by the Shropshire Rotary Club in 1951. It is run by the 2nd Wellington Scout Group and includes a climbing wall on site, and buildings on site for indoor activities.

=== Staffordshire ===
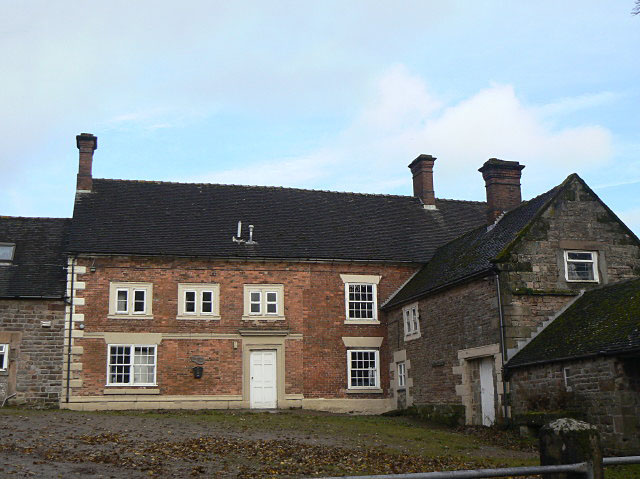
Orchard Farm, a former Scout Activity Centre located in Staffordshire but owned by Hertfordshire Scout County.

There are a number of campsites open to Scouts within the boundaries of Staffordshire including both those owned and operated by Staffordshire Scout County and its districts as well as those owned by neighbouring counties. In addition to the larger sites, a number of more local and simple sites also exist to facilitate local Scouting. Patshull Activity Centre, run by Wolverhampton Scouts, is a 30-acre (120,000 m^{2}) site near Albrighton with a 28-bed centre, an indoor barn and activities including high ropes, archery, shooting and water sports. The 3-acre (12,000 m^{2}) Rangemore Scout Centre is owned by Burton District and has a 32-bed centre, archery range, bouldering wall and pioneering. Sherratts Wood Camp Site, a 30-acre (120,000 m^{2}) site in Leigh, opened in 2000 with an indoor activity centre, climbing wall and archery and rifle shooting ranges.

The county also formerly hosted Orchard Farm, a 56-bed centre restored in 1982 and jointly run by Hertfordshire Scout County and Girlguiding Hertfordshire for access to walking and climbing opportunities that was closed in January 2016.

==== Barnswood ====
Located near the border with Cheshire, equidistant between Leek and Congleton, is Barnswood Scout Camp which is owned by Macclesfield and Congleton Scout District in Cheshire. The 63-acre (250,000 m^{2}) site has a mix of woodland and open grassland, two multi-purpose activity chalets for around 50 people and two chalets with 12 beds each as indoor accommodation.

On site activities include an adventure course, ball sports, orienteering, bush craft and shelter building. The site also contains a museum of Scouting including artefacts relating to the Scouts in Macclesfield and Congleton.

==== Beaudesert ====
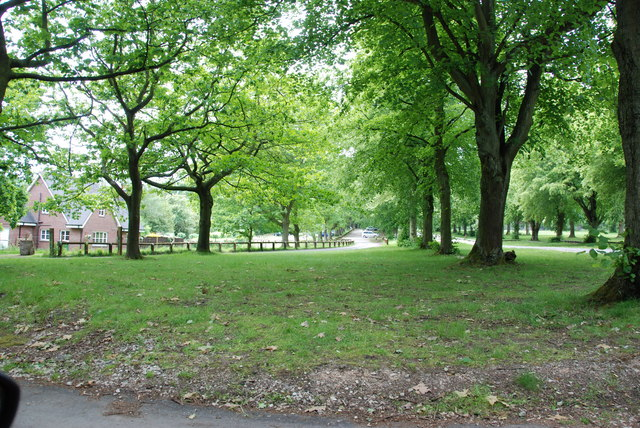
Beaudesert Outdoor Activity Centre.

Beaudesert Outdoor Activity Centre, situated on the edge of Cannock Chase, is a 120-acre (490,000 m^{2}) site run by the Beaudesert Trust since 1937 for youth groups and includes Scout and Guide commissioners as trustees. Accommodation on the site is through 38 campsite pitches, a tented village, a hammock camp and seven accommodation buildings with a total of 122 beds.

The site has a large range of activities offered on site including caving, adventure course, bush craft, low ropes, high ropes, crate stacking, zip line, climbing, via ferrata, kayaking, rafting, coracling, rifle shooting, archery, tomahawks, crazy golf and fencing.

==== Consall ====
Located between Leek and Cheadle is Consall Scout Camp, a 26-acre (110,000 m^{2}) wooded site donated by the Podmore family in 1953. In addition to the camping space, the site also has a 38-bed double storey Gibson Building, 16-bed Clifton Building and the 24-bed Pointon Cabin to provide indoor accommodation. On-site activities include a climbing wall and abseiling tower, archery and rifle shooting ranges and laser tag.

==== Kibblestone ====
Located in Oulton, Kibblestone Outdoor Activity Centre is a 98-acre (400,000 m^{2}) site with numerous accommodation buildings and space for 2,000 campers run by Staffordshire Scout County. Also sometimes referred to as Kibblestone International Scout Camp, the use of the site by the Scouts dates back to 1927 when 2 acres (8,100 m^{2}) of the Kibblestone Hall estate were donated to the Scouts by Ronald and Ida Copeland who both had connections to the Scouting and Girlguiding movements respectively. The first on-site building was constructed in 1931 and the site developed with electricity added in 1956 and mains water in 1966 while the Hall that previously formed the centre of the estate was uninhabited after 1935 and demolished entirely in 1954. The site was sold to the local Scout association in 1960 and through changes in name and boundary became run by a Kibblestone District in 2015.

In addition to the camping space on site, there are a number of indoor accommodation buildings including the 42-bed Cub Lair, 44-bed Ronald Copeland Training Centre, 12-bed Copeland Cabin, 6-bed Outpost, 14-bed Rover Den and 16-bed Dale Centre. While a number of these also include space for indoor activities there is also the Fox Glen building which can cater for groups of up to 250. On site activities include climbing, high ropes activities, low ropes activities, rafting, crate stacking and target sports including archery, air rifle shooting and axe throwing.

==== Kinver ====
Located within the Southern salient of Staffordshire near the Worcestershire border is Kinver Scout Camp, owned by the Hereford and Worcester Scout Association County. The site is 23 acres (93,000 m^{2}) of woodland with 11 open glades used for campsites and indoor facilities for Scouts and other youth groups. The Scouts have camped on the site since 1921 and lodges for accommodation have been added to the site since 1935. The site is currently closed but Hereford and Worcester Scout Association has stated that it may reopen if a sustainable business plan can be put in place.

The site has an ranges for rifle shooting, archery and crossbows; a climbing tower and crate stacking. Smaller activities offered include grass sledges, pioneering, orienteering and bat detecting. There is a range of accommodation on the site including the 20-bed Harcourt Webb cabin, often partnered with the adjacent Jim Jukes Cabin for activity space and catering, the 14-bed double storey Chief's Lodge and the 6-bed Albert Hall, often used in conjunction with the 2 Simmonds Cabins with 5 beds between them. The site also has the Compa Hall which can be used for indoor activities and is used as a HQ for a local Scout group.

=== Warwickshire ===
In addition to the large centre at Broadwater, the Coton Campsite north of Rugby provides back-to-basics camping and facilities run by Rugby Scout District and previously known as the H W C Knowles Memorial Site while Five Ways Lakes is also a camping site often used by Scouts but also open to the general public.

==== Broadwater ====
Alfrey Activity Centre, Broadwater is run by Warwickshire Scout County and is a 6-acre (24,000 m^{2}) site near the centre of the county. The site opened in 1968 and was established using World War II buildings and with the work of Venture Scouts from Atherstone and Nuneaton.

In addition to open field camping, there is also the 26-bed Alfrey Lodge, the 24-bed Aylesford Lodge, the 4-bed Skip's Retreat general purpose centre and a general purpose building the Troop Room. The site has on-site activities including a climbing wall, shooting and archery ranges, adventure course, trampolines, cresta run, bouncy castle and go-carts.

=== West Midlands ===
==== Rough Close ====
Rough Close Scout Campsite and Activity Centre is the City of Coventry Scout County's campsite, located outside of the city of Coventry, about 1 mile (1.6 km) west of Tile Hill Village. The Rough Close site was purchased in 1946, for £1000.

The site offers a number of fields and pitches, as well as a number of buildings on the site offering indoor accommodation through the 22-bed Norton Cabin and a training and day room, the George Sheppard Cabin. The centre provides activities including archery, air rifle shooting, climbing, pioneering and orienteering.

Roy Morris, former President of the 4th Coventry Scout Group, who joined the Scout movement in 1942, was awarded the Silver Wolf Award, the highest award of the Scout Association, for raising £85,000 for Rough Close in 2008.

=== Worcestershire ===
==== Blackwell Adventure ====
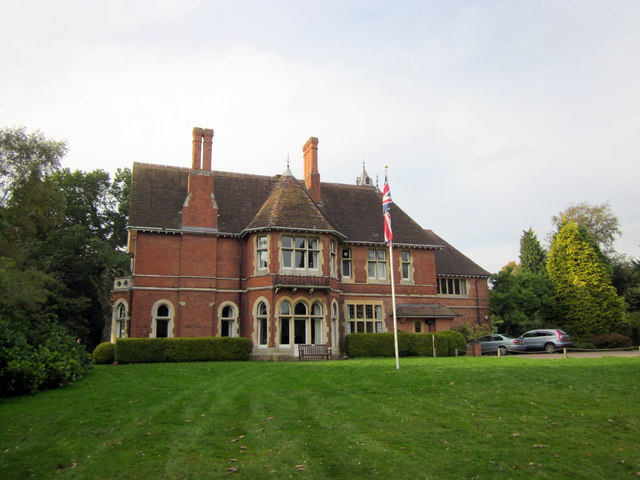
Blackwell Court Manor House.

The Scout Association's Birmingham Scout County own and run two activity centres near Bromsgrove under the brand of Blackwell Adventure: Blackwell Court and Pikes Pool. The subsidiary was formed in 2005 to drive the development of the two sites and the activities on offer.

Blackwell Court is the primary site of 52 acres (210,000 m^{2}) of primarily open fields on the former Blackwell Court estate. It was purchased by Birmingham Scout County in the late 1960s after their previous site at Yorks Wood had become encroached by housing and become too small for the needs of the large Scouting population in urban Birmingham. The site contains the group's indoor accommodation, primarily the restored Manor house with 56 beds split over 12 bedrooms, the Roberts Podded village of 16 pods with 58 beds, the Brooks Tented village of 56 beds in 16 tents and the 28-bed Stable block. The site also has an indoor sports hall, group room suitable for training, on-site shop and an outdoor shelter (Beaver Lodge) which are also available for visiting sites.

The second site, located less than a km to the West, is Pikes Pool, a 50-acre (200,000 m^{2}) area of woodland and open fields with a large body of water on one side. The site does not have any bedded accommodation but does have the Pikes Pool Centre, an indoor facility with kitchen and dining areas.

Blackwell Adventure run a number of activities across both sites, some exclusive to one site and some operated on both sites for the convenience of their guests. Activities available on both sites include archery, zip wire, high ropes activities, crate stacking, pioneering and orienteering. The Blackwell Court site also has climbing (inside and outside), 3G swing, caving, swimming pool, tree trek, bushcraft, grass sledding, go karting and an obstacle course. The Pikes Pool site also has a rifle range, tunnel play complex and a variety of water activities on the lake itself.

==== Rhydd Covert ====
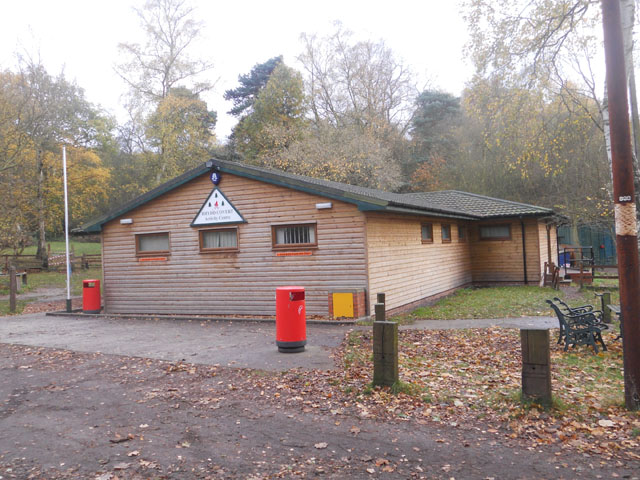
The Activity Centre at Rhydd Covert.

Located near Kidderminster and immediately to the East of West Midland Safari Park lies Rhydd Covert Scout Campsite which is owned and run by Wyre Forest Scout District, part of the Hereford and Worcester Scout County. The 45-acre (180,000 m^{2}) site consists of open grassland and woodland along with an activity centre. The site had been used by local Scouts since the early 1940s but was first donated to Kidderminster Scout District in June 1977 by Major and Mrs Harcourt-Webb before being subsequently expanded through the purchase of new land in 1983 and 1994. The activity centre building on site was destroyed in an arson attack in October 2004 and replaced with a new centre in July 2006 at a cost of £140,000, of which £80,000 was funded through a campaign by three local newspapers called Operation Covert.

The site has 17 distinct camping areas, an activity centre that sleeps 22 and can be used for training and an indoor activity space and on-site amenities including a camp shop, recreation area and camp fire circle. The site offers activities including archery and rifle shooting ranges, a climbing wall and abseiling tower, a caving complex, assault course, grass sledging, pedal karts, water slide and all terrain boarding.

== Gang Shows ==
There are several Scout Shows, known as Gang Shows in the region:

- East Birmingham Gang Show. Spitfire Scout District runs an annual Gang Show at Sheldon Heath Community Arts College in Sheldon.
- Coventry Scout Gang Show, started in the 1960s.
- Handsworth Gang Show, started in 1953.
- Hereford Gang Show. Runs every other year at The Courtyard Hereford.
- Kenilworth Gang Show, started in 1971.
- Kidderminster & Stourport Gang Show.
- Nuneaton Gang Show.
- Solihull Gang Show, started in 1982. Although it has existed unofficially for some time, after 25 years of Solihull Gang Show, 2007 saw the formation of the Solihull Gangshow Scout Fellowship, of which the stilt instruction/performance group Stiff and Stilted are a part.
- Stafford Gang Show - started as Stafford Scout Show in 1998
- Stoke-on-Trent & Newcastle Division's Gang Show - started in 1934.
- Stone Gang Show - started in 1967 celebrating 40 Years in 2007.
- Sutton Coldfield Gang Show, started in 1968. Runs a Show every 2 years in February at Bishop Vesey's Grammar School.
- Warwickshire Gang Show (WAGS), started in 1972.
- Tamworth Gang Show, runs every 2 years at the Tamworth Assembly Rooms.

== See also ==
- Scouting sections
- Neighbouring areas:
  - Scouting in North West England
  - Scouting in the East Midlands
  - Scouting in South West England
  - Scouting in South East England
  - Scouting in Wales
- Girlguiding Midlands
