= John Alan Chalmers =

Professor John Alan Chalmers (29 September 1904 – 14 March 1967) was a British atmospheric physicist based at Durham University. He is well known for his contributions to atmospheric electricity, particularly an internationally respected textbook, and, outside his scientific work, for his involvement with Scouting. This led to him being widely known to his colleagues by the nickname, "Skip", a commonly used term for the leader of a Scout troop.

== Education and early life ==
John Alan Chalmers (known as Alan) was born in London in 1904 and won a scholarship to Highgate School. He had one brother, Bruce Chalmers (who later became a well-known metallurgist), and a sister, Marian. In 1923 he won an open scholarship to Queens' College, Cambridge and graduated with a first class degree in Natural Sciences (Physics). He remained at Cambridge in the Cavendish Laboratory to study for a PhD, supervised by Rutherford. In 1928 he left Cambridge to take up a lectureship at Durham University. He received his PhD for a thesis entitled "Some problems in radioactivity" in 1930.

== Career ==
Chalmers started working on atmospheric electricity early in his career and published around 90 papers. He spent his entire career at Durham, and was promoted to Senior Lecturer in 1937, Reader in 1947 and Professor in 1965. Many of the students he mentored became distinguished scientists (for example, Frank Pasquill). The first edition of his textbook was published in 1949. It was subsequently revised (also called Atmospheric Electricity but with a new publisher) in 1957, with the second edition published posthumously in 1967. Chalmers worked across the whole subject of atmospheric electricity, but he published most papers on point discharge (now more commonly referred to as corona discharge) and the charge on precipitation. He was equally at home with theory and experimental work, including developing instrumentation where needed. This approach reflected his rigorous and broad training in experimental physics typical of the Cavendish Laboratory led by Thomson and Rutherford. Many of his field experiments were carried out in the grounds of Durham University Observatory.

Chalmers was also a respected teacher and administrator at the University of Durham and became Dean of the Science Faculty in the 1960s. The J.A. Chalmers Prize for Experimental Physics is still awarded to the best undergraduate student of experimental physics. A Chalmers prize, created in 1968, is also given to the best student taking Physics A-level at Highgate School.

== Scientific legacy ==
Chalmers' most enduring publication is probably his textbook which remains one of the clearest introductions to the subject available. It is still regularly cited. His work on corona discharge laid the modern foundations of the subject. His last paper, submitted posthumously, established a polynomial relationship between emitted corona current and voltage which has been used extensively by researchers studying corona discharge during thunderstorms. He also demonstrated, by simultaneous measurements at Durham's Observatory and science site (960m apart) that charge can be emitted by steam locomotives and power lines and that these electrical structures remain identifiable whilst being carried by the wind.

Chalmers died following a short illness in 1967. After this, the group was led at Durham by Walter Hutchinson, broadening to include collaboration between Durham's atmospheric physicists and astronomers.

On 26 May 2017 the Royal Meteorological Society's Special Interest Group on Atmospheric Electricity held a discussion meeting at Durham's Physics Department to mark the 50th anniversary year of Chalmers' death, which included contributions by his former co-workers, and has inspired a biographical article.
