= Scouting in North East England =

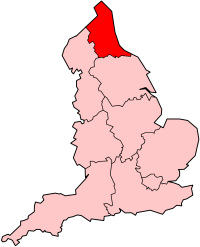

Scouting in North East England refers to Scouting in the official region of North East England. It is largely represented by the Scout Association of the United Kingdom and some groups of traditional Scouting, including the Baden-Powell Scouts' Association, and the European Scout Federation (British Association).

The Scout Association North East Region includes two official regions of England, North East England and Yorkshire and the Humber. This region contains eight Scout Counties. Cleveland, Durham and Northumberland are in the official region of North East England, while Humberside, Central Yorkshire, North Yorkshire, South Yorkshire and West Yorkshire are in the official region of Yorkshire and Humberside and are covered in Scouting in Yorkshire and the Humber.

Durham University Scout and Guide Group, and Newcastle Universities Student Scout and Guide Group (a.k.a. NUSSAGG, serving Newcastle University and Northumbria University), affiliated with the Student Scout and Guide Organisation (SSAGO), are in this region. A notable Scout at Durham University was Professor John Alan Chalmers (1904–1967) who was Durham University Rover Scout Leader, Assistant County Commissioner and District Commissioner for Durham City, with his Scouting and scientific work recognised in his obituary by the Royal Meteorological Society.

== History of Scouting in North East England ==
The first official Scout Camp after the creation of the Scout Movement was at Humshaugh. In 2008, Jamboree 2008 an independent Jamboree, was held near the original site to celebrate the 100 year anniversary of the first official Scout Camp. A notable early Scout in Northumberland was Captain Cecil Victor 'Swannie' Swan, M.C. (1887–1964), a friend of Baden-Powell and a contingent leader to early Jamborees.

== The Scout Association Counties ==
The Scout Association in North East England is administered through three Scout Counties, Cleveland Scout County, Durham Scout County and Northumberland Scout County.

=== Cleveland Scout County ===
County badge as worn on the uniform of Scouting members in Cleveland

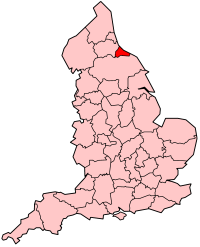
Map of England highlighting the location of Cleveland

Cleveland Scout County is concurrent with the former county area of Cleveland on the border between County Durham and North Yorkshire, and provides Scouting opportunities for young people and adults in the areas around Hartlepool, Stockton-on-Tees, and Middlesbrough.

The county is currently divided into 5 Scout Districts.

- East Cleveland District
- Tees Valley North District
- Middlesbrough District
- Redcar and Eston District
- Stockton and Thornaby District

=== Durham Scout County ===
The badge worn by all members of Durham Scout County.

Durham Scout County covers an area corresponding with the North East Combined Authority and the borough of Darlington.

The earliest record of Scouting in Durham City is 1910. At this time there were 6 Scout Groups and 140 Scouts. By 1936 there were 24 Scout Groups stretching from Waterhouses to Cornsay and Pittington. Over the years the various Scout Groups across the district have opened, closed, merged and reformed. 4th Durham Scouts were founded in their present form 1926 and 5th Durham Scouts two years later. Some signs of the Scout Groups which have now closed can still be seen in the current Group numbering system for example, 3rd Durham (founded 1953) and 6th Durham (founded 1930) merged in 1966 to become 9th Durham Scout Group. In 2006 the 1st Durham Group and 9th Durham Groups merged to form the 19th Durham Scout Group. According to the 2012 Census there are currently more than 500 young people involved with Scouting in Durham City and District.

The county is divided into 14 Scout Districts:

- Bishop Auckland
- Blaydon and District
- Chester-le-Street
- Crook and Weardale
- Darlington and District
- Derwentside
- Durham City and District
- Gateshead and District
- Houghton-le-Spring and District
- Peterlee
- Seaham and District
- South Tyneside
- Sunderland
- Teesdale

At the 2012 Census there were over 5,500 young people involved in Scouting in Durham County being supported by over 1,000 adults.

=== Northumberland Scout County ===
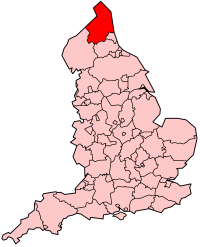
Map of the UK highlighting the location of Northumberland

Northumberland Scout County covers the historic county of Northumberland. the county has introduced an award for Groups, to give them goals and create a more efficient and better group. The award "The County Standard" is gained by achieving a number of goals/targets published every year by County. 2nd Seaton Delaval Scout Group was the first to achieve this award.

The county is divided into ten Scout Districts:

- City of Newcastle (Great North & Newcastle East Districts combined in 2012)
- Benton District
- Blyth Valley District
- Castle Morpeth District
- Hadrian District
- Mid-Northumberland District
- North Northumberland District
- Tynemouth District
- Wansbeck District
- Whitley Bay and District

Northumberland Scout County organises Caud Marra, an annual winter camp at Hawkhirst Scout Activity Centre in Kielder Forest for the Scout section, and fun days for Beavers.

== Campsites ==
The Cleveland Scout Association County Camp Site is Raven Gill Campsite. Stockton District's campsite is "Pybus". 'Seeonee Lair' (Kettleness) Activity Centre is the responsibility of East Cleveland Scout District. Moor House Adventure Centre is run by Durham Scout Association County and licensed by the Adventure Activities Licensing Scheme.

Several camping and indoor accommodation sites are available within Northumberland. These include the Ford Scout Campsite and Powburn Adventure Centre].

Former Scout Campsites within the North East Region: Gosforth Park was situated close to the race course in Newcastle.

== Gang Shows ==
- Blyth Valley Gang Show started in 1992.
- Middlesbrough Gang Show, started in 1950, runs every two years.
- Newcastle Gang Show is the second oldest Gang Show in the world, having been started in 1937. It closed in 1992, but resumed in 1998.
- Tynemouth Gang Show, started in 1947, runs every two years.
- WYS On Show is West Yorkshire Scout County's Gang Show and runs every two years.
- Whitley Bay Gang Show.

== See also ==
- Scouting sections
- Scouting staff
- Girlguiding North East England
