= Progress in Materials Science =

- Discipline: Materials science
- Language: English
- Edited by: E. Arzt

Publication details
- Former name: Progress in Metal Physics
- History: 1949-present
- Publisher: Elsevier (Netherlands)
- Frequency: 8/year
- Impact factor: 42.9 (2025)

Standard abbreviations
- ISO 4: Prog. Mater. Sci.

Indexing
- ISSN: 0079-6425

Links
- Journal page; Journal access

Progress in Materials Science is a journal publishing review articles covering most areas of materials science, published by the Pergamon imprint of Elsevier. It was started in 1949 with the title Progress in Metal Physics with Bruce Chalmers serving as first editor. It was changed to the current title in 1961.
