= Roy Morris =

British Scout leader

- Born: c. 1930
- Died: 14 May 2011, aged 81; Styvechale, Coventry
- Occupation: Scout Leader
- Known for: Silver Wolf Award

Roy "Skip" Morris (c. 1930 – 14 May 2011) was a British Scout Leader and recipient of the Silver Wolf Award, the highest award of The Scout Association, "for services of the most exceptional character".

Morris joined the Scout movement in 1942. In 1969, he helped set up 4th Coventry Scout Group, and later became its president. In 1994, he was awarded the Silver Acorn for services to Scouting. He raised £85,000 through grants and donations for renovation of buildings at the Rough Close Outdoor Centre for Scouting on the western outskirts of Coventry. At a Scout parade on St George's Day (23 April) 2008, he was presented with the Silver Wolf. He died in 2011 after a short illness.
