= Botany Bay, Monmouthshire =

Coordinates: 51°42′53″N 2°40′54″W

Botany Bay is an area in the Wye Valley in Wales, above the village of Tintern. It is the location of a Gwent Scouts camp site covering 27 acres (11 ha).. It is now in Wye Valley community, and was previously in Tintern community. The Ordnance Survey grid reference is SO5202.
