= Bruce Chalmers =

- Born: October 15, 1907
- Died: May 25, 1990 (aged 82)
- Scientific career
- Fields: Physics

Bruce Chalmers (October 15, 1907 – May 25, 1990) was a British-born and educated physicist, a metallurgy professor at Harvard University, a member of the National Academy of Sciences, an editor in chief of Progress in Materials Science, master of John Winthrop House at Harvard University. An award has been established in his name - the Bruce Chalmers Award by the Minerals, Metals and Materials Society. The National Academies Press said that he had "a notable career as a scientist, educator and editor". Harvard University called him "an authority in the field of metallurgy".

His brother was the notable British atmospheric physicist, John Alan Chalmers (1904-1967).

== Awards and Distinctions ==
- the Saveur Award from the American Society of Metals
- the Clamer Medal from the Franklin Institute
- member of the National Academy of Sciences (1975)
- fellow of the American Academy of Arts and Sciences
