= Blackwell, Worcestershire =

Village in Worcestershire, England

Coordinates: 52.348553°N 2.014103°W

Blackwell
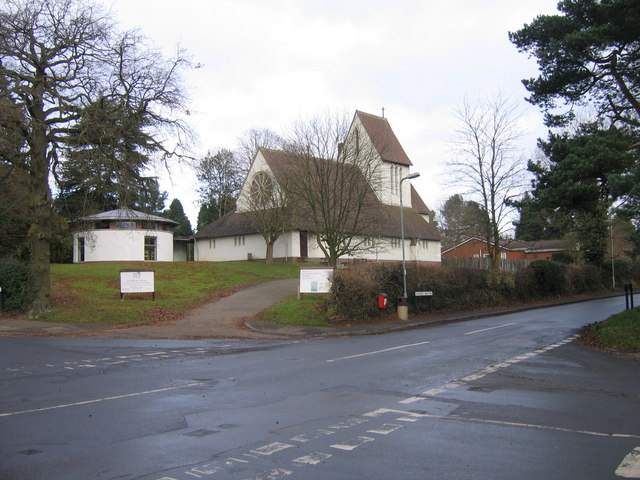
- St Catherine's Church Blackwell

- Location within Worcestershire
- OS grid reference: SO991722
  - London: 100 miles (160 km)
- Civil parish: Lickey and Blackwell
- District: Bromsgrove
- Shire county: Worcestershire
- Region: West Midlands
- Country: England
- Sovereign state: United Kingdom
- Post town: BROMSGROVE
- Postcode district: B60
- Dialling code: 0121
- Police: West Mercia
- Fire: Hereford and Worcester
- Ambulance: West Midlands
- UK Parliament: Bromsgrove

Blackwell is a village located in the North-East of Worcestershire and comes under the jurisdiction of Lickey and Blackwell Parish Council. Nearby large towns include Barnt Green and Bromsgrove. Worcester and Birmingham are also influential. The village had a station on the Birmingham and Gloucester Railway, at the summit of the Lickey Incline, however this closed in 1965.

== Background ==
The village has two churches, St Catherine's and the Methodist church (the latter having been bought by a glass company in the 21st Century) and now a private residence. In 2003/4, St Catherine's had the extension of "The wheel" added to it where meetings are held, etc.

The village has one shop that used to be a post office.

The Blackwell club was established in 1904 and has moved around the village throughout that time.

Blackwell has an active Scout Group (1st Blackwell), part of Bromsgrove District Scouts.

== Blackwell Music Festival ==
Each year, the village holds its own music festival, usually on the first Saturday in September. Showcasing a variety of acts and a wide range of styles, the all day festival was initially held in the grounds of Hunters Hill College. In 2021, the event moved to The Football Field on Linthurst Road, Blackwell, opposite Dale Hill.

== Outdoor Activity Centre ==
Blackwell Court is predominantly a children's centre with Scouting at its centre. Owned by the Scout Association County of Birmingham. Blackwell Adventure is a fully equipped outdoor activity centre covering 50 acres of parkland and is located within five minutes of the M42 and M5. They have indoor accommodation including a Manor House, stable bunk house and tented villages as well as many camping grounds to suit all both at Blackwell Court and their second site at Pikes Pool. Some of the activities include 240 metre Zip wire, 3G swing, high ropes, climbing walls, kayaking plus loads more. They also have an additional 50 acres of land at Pikes Pool.
