= Girlguiding North East England =

Girlguiding North East England is one of the nine Regions and Countries of Girlguiding UK. The regional office is in Huntington, near York.

== Counties ==
Girlguiding North East England is subdivided into 17 Girlguiding UK Counties. These do not correspond to the counties defined by the British government.

- Cleveland
- Durham North
- Durham South
- East Yorkshire
- Leeds
- Lincolnshire North
- Newcastle upon Tyne
- North Tyneside
- North Yorkshire North East
- North Yorkshire South
- North Yorkshire West
- Northumberland
- Sheffield
- South Yorkshire
- West Yorkshire North
- West Yorkshire South
- West Yorkshire West

== The 'Spirit of Guiding' ==
The 'Spirit of Guiding' is the region's narrowboat. It is based on the Rochdale Canal at Todmorden and is hired out to Guide and Senior Section groups.

== South Yorkshire Guide House ==
South Yorkshire Guide House is located in the Scout Association's Hesley Wood Outdoor Activities Centre. It provides accommodation and an indoor area for activities.

== Whiteley Woods Outdoor Activity Centre ==
Whiteley Woods Outdoor Activity Centre is located 3 miles South West of Sheffield city centre, just off the main road to Ringinglow. (Grid Ref. 307846 SK 2838 OS Number 110)

There are five campsites with wet weather shelters, two buildings for holidays offering accommodation for 24 and 31 people, including many disability-friendly features, a large barn with an open fireplace and a notice board to display charts etc., a meeting room for 12–15 people and a camp shop. A variety of activities, including Archery; Back Woods Cooking; Camping; Canoeing; Chess; Climbing Wall; Draughts; Games Chest; Games Equipment; Grass Sledding; Holidays; Hopscotch; Noughts and Crosses; Orienteering; Parachute Games; Picnicking; Pioneering; Pond Dipping; Quizzes; Trails and Treasure Hunts; Adventure Course; All Weather Table Tennis, are available.

== Montserrat ==
An eruption of Mount Soufrière in 1997 destroyed the Guide Headquarters on Montserrat. It had been open less than ten years. In 2007, the rebuilding of Headquarters began using money raised by Guides in the North East region.

== See also ==
- Scouting in North East England
- Scouting in Yorkshire and the Humber
- The Scout Association
