= Brynbach =

Former scout campsite in Wales

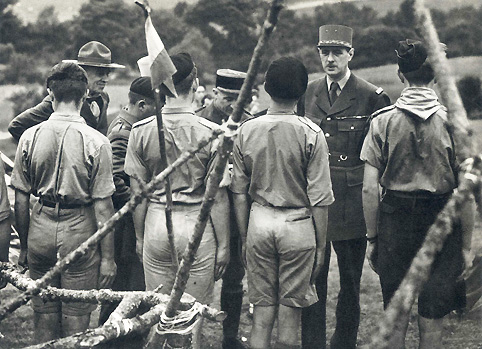
- General Charles de Gaulle visiting French Scouts at Brynbach in 1940
- Interactive map of Brynbach
- Location: Brynbach, Saron, Denbighshire
- Coordinates: 53°07′07″N 3°27′50″W
- Elevation: 280 m (920 ft)
- Type: Campsite
- Land: 200 acres (81 ha)
- Facilities: Boating lake, swimming pool, summer house
- Fires: Yes
- Season: Spring, summer and autumn
- Operated by: Scouting Association
- Established: 1930

Brynbach was a National Campsite of the Scout Association, situated near Saron in Denbighshire in North Wales. The 200 acres (81 ha) site had its heyday between the 1930s and the late 1950s. It had naturalistic wooden entrance gates designed by Lord Baden Powell, the founder of Scouting.

The camp had a summer-house (later moved to Gilwell Park), a 1 m (3 ft 3 in) deep boating lake, and a spring-filled swimming pool. An outline of the Fleur de Lys, the Scouting emblem, was created by planting Golden Larch trees in the surrounding woods.

== Demise ==
The original owner of Brynbach camp died in the early 1960s. Although the continued use of the camp by the Cheshire Scouting Association was a provision in her will, her beneficiaries withdrew from that agreement. Occasional troops were permitted to use the site but access was strictly limited. The last camps were held in the late 1980s and early 1990s.
