= Scouting in Yorkshire and the Humber =

Youth activities in an English region

Scouting in Yorkshire and the Humber is largely represented by the Scout Association of the United Kingdom and some Groups of traditional Scouting including the Baden-Powell Scouts' Association.

The Scout Association in Yorkshire and the Humber is part of the Scout Association North East Region, as is the Scout Association in Scouting in North East England. The Scout Association North East Region is the only one that covers two official regions of England. There are also four student Scouting associations based at universities in the region, which are affiliated with the Student Scout and Guide Organisation (SSAGO).

== The Scout Association Counties ==
The Scout Association in Yorkshire and the Humber is administered through five Scout Counties: Central Yorkshire Scout County, Humberside Scout County, North Yorkshire Scout County, South Yorkshire Scout County and West Yorkshire Scout County.

=== Central Yorkshire Scout County ===
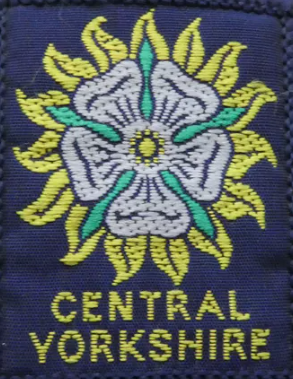
County badge as worn on the uniform of Scouting members in Central Yorkshire

Central Yorkshire provides Scouting opportunities for young people and adults in the metropolitan boroughs of Leeds and Wakefield and the surrounding area.

The County is currently divided into eight Scout Districts:

- Leeds Templars: this district covers the eastern area of Leeds, including Garforth, Kippax, Allerton Bywater and surrounding villages.
- North Leeds
- Pontefract and Castleford
- Shire Oak (Leeds)
- South Leeds and Morley
- Wakefield
- West Leeds
- Wetherby: this district includes parts of North Yorkshire such as Sherburn in Elmet.

The Central Yorkshire Scout Council administers the award programme for the Yorkshire Challenge, a progressive Scouting award first introduced in 2006. The Yorkshire Challenge is open to all Cubs, Scouts, Explorer Scouts, Network Scouts, and Leaders across the United Kingdom.

To earn the bronze award, participants must spend four nights under canvas or in a bivouac in four different months of the year, along with completing several additional activities. The silver award requires eight nights in eight different months, while the gold award requires twelve nights in twelve different months.

==== County Expeditions ====
The County organises international expeditions, enabling a number of Explorer Scouts and Scout Network members to undertake adventurous activities in other countries.

=== Humberside Scout County ===
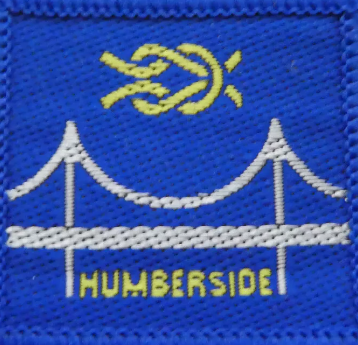
County badge as worn on the uniform of Scouting members in Humberside

Scouting in Humberside covers the former non-metropolitan county of Humberside. The headquarters of Humberside Scouts is at Raywell Park Activity Centre.

There are 8 Districts within the Humberside County:

- Beverley and Hornsea
- Blacktoft Beacon
- City of Hull
- Grimsby and Cleethorpes
- North Lincolnshire
- Pocklington
- South Holderness
- Wolds and Coast

The Districts within Humberside were changed as part of the restructuring in 2011/2012. During this time Boothferry and Haltemprice were merged into Blacktoft Beacon. On 30 May 2012, the three Hull Districts: East Hull, North Hull and West Hull merged to make one District named City of Hull.

=== North Yorkshire Scout County ===
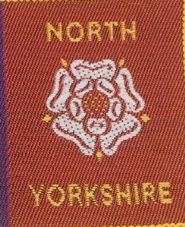
County badge as worn on the uniform of Scouting members in North Yorkshire

North Yorkshire Scout County covers the county of North Yorkshire and is geographically the largest of the 4 Yorkshire scouting counties.

The 1st Helmsley scout group was established in 1909, within the first two years of the initiation of the scouting movement. North Yorkshire Scouts celebrated the centenary of scouting in 2007 by joining the Bilton Conservation Group to plant 2000 trees donated by the Woodland Trust.

In 2024, the county were to host the Larkin International Jamboree at Duncombe Park in Helmsley. The next Larkin Jamboree will be held at the same location in August 2028.

The County is currently divided into 12 Scout Districts:

- Harrogate and Nidderdale
- Ingleborough
- Richmondshire
- Ripon and District
- Easingwold
- Selby
- York Ebor
- York Minster
- North Hambleton
- Ryedale
- Scarborough and District
- South Craven.

There is an active Scout Network in the county.

As of 2022, there are 6 Squirrel dreys (for young people aged 4-6) being run in the county.

The current County Commissioner, Max Butler, was appointed in March 2022.

=== South Yorkshire Scout County ===
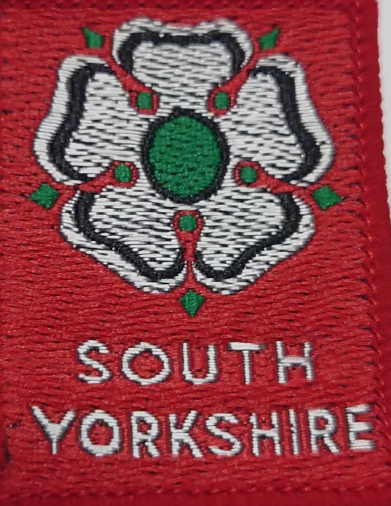
County badge as worn on the uniform of Scouting members in South Yorkshire

Scouting in South Yorkshire includes Sheffield, Barnsley, Rotherham and Doncaster.

The County is divided into 7 Scout Districts:

- Sheffield Hallam
- Sheffield Sheaf
- Sheffield Norfolk
- Sheffield Don
- Barnsley (Barnsley, Pennine, Central and Fitzwilliam merged into Barnsley District)
- Rotherham
- Doncaster Danum

Sheffield Hallam is the largest District in the County with over 30 Scout Groups. Sheffield Hallam was formed when Sheffield Porter and Sheffield Rivelin merged in 2007.

The Doncaster Danum District has a Scout Band.

=== West Yorkshire Scout County ===
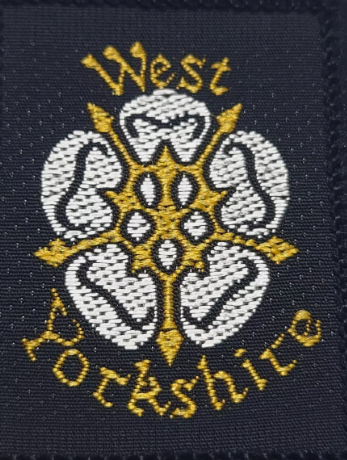
County badge as worn on the uniform of Scouting members in West Yorkshire

West Yorkshire covers the metropolitan districts of Bradford, Kirklees, and Calderdale. The Scout county of West Yorkshire does not cover the whole of the West Yorkshire metropolitan county. Because the West Yorkshire area is densely populated the boroughs of Leeds and Wakefield have a separate Scout County called Central Yorkshire.

The Scout county's office is located within the Jubilee Centre at the Bradley Wood Campsite on the outskirts of Brighouse.

West Yorkshire Scouts celebrated a successful centenary year of 2007.

West Yorkshire is subdivided into 14 Scout Districts:

- Aire Valley
- Bradford North
- Bradford South
- Brighouse
- Halifax
- Heavy Woollen
- Holme Valley
- Huddersfield North
- Huddersfield South East
- Huddersfield South West
- Keighley
- Pennine Calder
- Spen Valley
- Wharfedale

West Yorkshire has two Scout Bands - Revolution Show Corps (based in Queensbury) and Spen Valley Scout and Guide Band (based in Cleckheaton).

The County has a number of campsites and activity centres. The county also operates a Water Activities Centre - Green Withens Watersports Centre at Green Withens reservoir, near Ripponden. Wharfedale District operates Reva Scouts Water Activity Centre, near Hawksworth.

The current County Commissioner, Tobias Hammond, was appointed in May 2025.

== Scouting in higher education ==
There are also four student Scouting associations based at universities in the region which are affiliated with the Student Scout and Guide Organisation (SSAGO). These are:

- Students of Hull Association of Guides and Scouts at the University of Hull
- Leeds University Union Scouts and Guides, covering the University of Leeds, Leeds Beckett University and Leeds Conservatoire
- Sheffield Students in Guides and Scouts, covering the University of Sheffield and Sheffield Hallam University, and
- Scouts and Girl Guides York at the University of York.

== Campsites and activity centres ==
=== Central Yorkshire ===
==== Aldwark Water Activity Centre ====
The Aldwark Water Activity Centre is owned and maintained by Central Yorkshire Scout County. The centre is located at Aldwark Bridge on the River Ure, 8 miles upstream from the city of York.

The centre has one large camping field, as well as a converted mill which consists of a number of dormitories. The centre has kayaks and boats for sailing, and runs training courses to gain qualifications in these activities.

==== Bramhope Scout Campsite ====
The Bramhope Scout Campsite is situated just outside the village of Bramhope, approximately 8 miles north-north-west of Leeds. The site covers 13 1/2 acres (5.5 ha) of woodland and fields, offering various camping pitches for any sized camp up to a district-scale event.

As well as the camping pitches, there are a number of buildings on the site offering accommodation and indoor training facilities. The site offers archery, air rifles, pedal karting, climbing, abseiling, and pioneering, amongst other activities. There are also facilities located near to the site which enable sailing, kayaking and swimming. A dedicated area for Squirrels and early years educational use, called "Squirrel Square", has been developed.

==== Calderdrift ====
Calderdrift Campsite, located 5 miles (8.0 km) to the south-west of Wakefield, is operated by Wakefield District. A former canal barge, the Jubilee Venture now offers land-based accommodation there.

==== Hunters Greave Scout Activity Centre ====
Hunters Greave Scout Activity Centre in Newlay, near Bramley, is operated by Shire Oak District. There is space for 100 campers.

==== Wike ====
The Wike 'back-to-basics' campsite is operated by North Leeds District Scout Council.

=== Humberside ===
- Raywell Park Activity Centre - County Headquarters
- Bailwood, a safe enclosed space made up of a 3 acre camping field and approx. 21 acres of woodland making it ideal for both large groups and small looking for woodland adventures.
- Cherry Garth
- Givendale
- Melton
- Primrose Hill
- Tablers Wood

=== North Yorkshire ===
North Yorkshire Scout County and its districts, have five campsites and activity centres:

- Watson Scout Centre is a self catering accommodation centre for 32 people plus 1 acre of camping, located in the North York Moors National Park at Carlton in Cleveland
- Snowball Plantation, a 20 acre campsite on the eastern side of York which includes indoor accommodation
- Thornthwaite Activity Centre & Campsite near Harrogate is in the Nidderdale Area of Outstanding Natural Beauty and close to the Yorkshire Dales National Park with 11 camping sites available spread over approx. 15 acres and room for up to 120 campers.
- Tamarak Scout Camp, set in the middle of Barlow Common nature reserve near Selby.
- Birch Hall Scout Campsite, a 15 acre forest site near Scarborough

The county also has a water sports centre located at Ellerton-on-Swale near Catterick.

Also in North Yorkshire is Hag Dyke, located halfway between Kettlewell and the summit of Great Whernside, which is a hostel run by 1st Ben Rhydding Scout and Guide Group, rebuilt for scouting use in 1959-60.

Madge Hill Campsite, east of Pateley Bridge, is located within North Yorkshire but maintained by a team from West Leeds District. The site was presented to Farsley District Scouts in 1930 by the Hainsworth family. The site has a bunkhouse and space for camping.

=== South Yorkshire ===
There are four camp sites:

- Hesley Wood Scout Activity Centre, Chapeltown, Sheffield.
- Silverwood Campsite, Great Falls, Silkstone, Barnsley.
- Squirrel Wood Campsite, Burghwallis, Doncaster.
- Hundall Campsite, Sheffield Ridgeway.

Hesley Wood is used for Wood Badge and other Adult Leader Training.

=== West Yorkshire ===
Bradley Wood is the West Yorkshire Scout County's campsite and activity centre, near Brighouse on the border of Kirklees and Calderdale.

There are several others run by Scout Districts or Groups:

- Blackhills Scout Campsite is run by the Districts of Bradford North and Bradford South.
- Curly Hill Campsite and Centre, located in Middleton, near Ilkley, is run by Wharfedale District.
- Fanwood campsite and activity centre is run and managed by the Scouts and Guides of Spen Valley District, and is based in Gomersal near Bradford.
- Sconce camp site, near Shipley, is operated by Aire Valley District.

== Retail ==
The Scout and Guide Shop (previously SGS Outdoors) is a combined Scout and Guide Shop in Sheffield with a full e-commerce website. There is also a Scout Shop in Doncaster with online access. West Leeds Scout District operates a shop in Pudsey which is open on Friday evenings and Saturdays during the day.

== Gang Shows ==
Examples of gang shows held in recent years include:

- Bradford Gang Show
- 20th Sheffield (Ecclesall Church) Gang Show, last held February 2024 (prior show in 2017).
- Harrogate Gang Show.
- Keighley Scout Gangshow, restarted in 2008.
- Meanwood Gang Show
- Northallerton Gang Show, started in 2005.
- 1st Riccall Scout Group Gang Show - started in 2009.
- Todmorden Gang Show, started in 1958 by Philip Suthers.
- West Yorkshire Gang Show.
- York Gang Show, started in 1987.

== See also ==
- Scouting sections
- Scouting staff
- Girlguiding North East England
