= Girlguiding Midlands =

Girlguiding Midlands is one of the nine regions and countries of Girlguiding UK. The Midland Region HQ is on Lower Church Street in Ashby-de-la-Zouch. As of June 2025, Chief Commissioner is currently Clare Shinton.

== Counties ==
Girlguiding Midlands is subdivided into 11 counties:

- Birmingham
- Derbyshire
- Herefordshire
- Leicestershire
- Northamptonshire
- Nottinghamshire
- Shropshire
- Staffordshire
- Warwickshire
- West Mercia
- Worcestershire

These may not all correspond to the counties defined by the British government.
