= Eric Mockler-Ferryman =

British army military intelligence officer (1896–1978)

Brigadier Eric Edward Mockler-Ferryman CBE (1896–1978) was a British army military intelligence officer who wrote the British official history of the Second World War between 1947 and 1952. During the Second World War, Ferryman headed the German section of the Directorate of Military Intelligence (DMI), he was General Eisenhower's chief of intelligence in the run-up to Operation Torch, and he ended the war with a transfer to the civilian Special Operations Executive (SOE). He was awarded the Legion of Merit.

Prior to the war, Mockler-Ferryman visited Australia. During this trip, he joined W.F Waters and the Victorian Rover Scouts on a tour of the Bogong High Plains during the winter of 1938. Following the trip, Mockler-Ferryman donated £300 towards the construction of the Bogong Rover Chalet in 1940.

== Primary sources ==
Ball, Gassert, Gestrich & Neitzel, "Cultures of Intelligence in the Era of the World Wars", New York: Oxford, 2020
