= Rovers (Australia) =

Scouts Australia Rovers program

Scouts Australia
- Age range: 18–25
- Founded: 1918
- Founder: The Boy Scouts Association of the United Kingdom
Previous; Venturers	
- Website; Rovers Australia

An adaptation of the Rovers training program is operated by Scouts Australia for adults aged between 18 and 25 years of age.

Rovers are organised into local Units (formerly and traditionally known as "Crews") which may be part of or associated with a Scout Group. Rovers are encouraged to become better citizens through training programs, developing leadership skills, participating in outdoor activities, attending national and international events, providing service to the community, and generally building their life skills.

== History ==
Scouting in Australia in various forms and organisations started after the publication of fortnightly pamphlets which later formed Scouting for Boys, in 1908. The minimum age of a scout youth member was generally 10 to 18-years-of-age. The loss of young men at 18 to the movement was considered an issue, with some kept on in minor roles, became scoutmasters, or formed an Old Scouts' Club. In 1910 in Victoria, a 'Corps of Guides' section was proposed for those boys not wishing to become scoutmasters or assistant scout masters, but 'desirous to continuing their scout practice in real earnest', and between 16 and 25 years of age.

By 1917, in England the Senior Scout Scheme was created for boys over fifteen, and were known as 'Rovers'. (Today's Venturer Scout section, known initially as Senior Scouts, was not created until 1946.)

In late-1918 as young men returned from World War I back to Australia they sought outlets with like-minded others. The Rover section was officially adopted in 1918. As well as acting as leaders to youth sections, some chose to form Rover Patrols and undertake activities, many service-related, as a team. During the 1920s, these became named Rover 'Crews'. The first Australian Rover is thought to have been Eric Booth from the 1st Chatswood Scout Troop in New South Wales. After serving in the war, he was invested in the United Kingdom in November 1918 and given the charge to introduce Rover Scouting in Australia. After returning home to 1st Chatswood, he invested Arthur Hindwood, who is believed to be the first Rover invested in Australia.

In early 1919, the Tasmanian Boy Scouts' Association received correspondence from the London-based Commissioner for Overseas Dominions, regarding 'dealing with the maintenance of Rover Scouts or older boy's classes. The need for something to keep the adolescent lad in touch with the Movement is recognised'.

Impacted by the Great War, by 1920, the 'Rover' scheme was operational, members needing to be a minimum of 16 years, and a minimum height of 5 feet 4 inches (1.63 m), with 'reasonable physical development... [to conduct their own affairs] to a more advanced standard than Scouts'. The uniform was the Scout khaki, with red shoulder straps (with 'S.S.' on them for 'Senior Scouts), red garter tabs instead of green at the top of their socks, and 1 inch (25 mm) bands instead of half-inch bands on their Scout hat. Both Senior Scouts and Rover Troops existed. Some Rover Units in existence about this time included:

- NSW: Hurstville (the first in NSW to be "officially 'sworn in' as Rover Scouts" in mid-April 1920), Kogarah was operating by February 1922. Coffs Harbour Rover Troop was proposed for formation in July 1922.

The Rockdale and Hurstville Rover Patrols amalgamated in February 1922 to become the Rovers of St George District.

- Qld: There was a Rover Mate assisting the 2nd Toowoomba Troop by March 1923. A Bundaberg Patrol was fundraising in July 1923. Redcliffe had several Rovers by November 1923. By December 1923, a Brisbane Scout sports day saw Rover Troops from Milton and Kangaroo Point.

Scoutmaster B. Heape, a former Rover Mate with Haig Patrol in Great Britain, formed the Buderim Mountain Scout Troop in July 1922, changing to a mounted Troop in October 1922. By November 1923, he had five Rover Scouts, possibly the first Rovers to be in a mounted Troop.

- SA: 1st Woodville Troop voted to organise a Rover Patrol by February 1920.
- Tasmania: A small group at Launceston by November 1923.
- Victoria: By February 1922, there were Rovers with the 2nd Brunswick (Lord Jellicoe's Own) Scout Troop. By May 1922, there were Rovers with 10th Melbourne (Saint Peter's) Group.
- WA: No. 32 (Highgate Hill) was recognised from 9 March 1920 and had 17 members by December, and the 1st WA Sea Scouts group changed on 1 July 1920 to become a dedicated Sea Scout Rover Troop.

Baden-Powell's book Rovering to Success was published in 1922 and provided a "book of life-sport for young men", becoming the ethical foundation of the Rover section, which also detailed the aims and program of the section. The late 1920s saw Rovers adopt the theme of knighthood in their ceremonies and Crew structures.

At this time the Rover section motto of 'service' was established.

The minimum age was raised in 1920 to 17.5 years, and a maximum age of 25 added in 1936. Other changes included a proposal in 1970 to replace Rovers with a new section called 'Pathfinders'. This move that was ultimately abandoned after the 'Rover Scouts Must Stay' campaign mounted by the then current Rovers. Female members were admitted to Rover Crews in 1975 following trials in several NSW Crews.

The 1931 annual report indicated 633 Rover Scouts in New South Wales, 504 in Victoria, 255 in South Australia, 235 in Queensland, 74 in Western Australia, and 23 in Tasmania.

== Uniform ==
Since the 2000s, Rovers in Scouts Australia wear a blue uniform shirt, distinguished from other sections by the red yoke (including shoulder panels).

It is compulsory for invested members to wear a scarf (or neckerchief), as well as the badges they have been awarded.

The youth award scheme in Australian Scouting consists of badges for participation in the program, proficiency in adventurous activities, participation in major events, recognition of service and peak awards. In addition to these, Rovers are permitted to wear a Rover Scout shoulder knot and bar. The knot and its colours symbolise the idea of one program, one journey in Scouting, through a series of developmental age groups. It is to be presented in its entirety during an investiture. (The 'knot' has five ribbons (tan for Joey Scouts, yellow for Cub Scouts, green for Scouts, maroon for Venturer Scouts, with red for Rover Scouts) on the left shoulder, symbolising the role of the Rover section in helping and protecting their younger brothers and sisters.) The knot became optional with the 2020 uniform change.

== Organisation ==
Rovers are organised from a national level downwards, however the day-to-day running of the section is organised at a branch (state) level. Victoria, New South Wales and Queensland are split into Regions which in turn are made up of Units. There are around 3,000 Rovers nationally in about 250 Units.

Unlike the other sections of Scouts Australia, Rovers are self-governing, with Rovers under 26 becoming the leaders of their own section while still taking part in the program. After the Scout Association of Australia's 1970 Design for Tomorrow Report, amongst other changes, their leaders aged over 25 were asked to step back from being Rover Scout Leaders to become Rover Advisers, with the Crew Leaders, Region Rover Council Chairs and Branch Rover Council Chairs taking up the responsibility for their Rovers.

The National Rover Council, a group of Rover representatives from each state who coordinate interstate efforts, was founded in 1979 and just like Units, all are under 26 years old.

=== Local Units ===
A local Rover Unit is run by its members and led by an elected committee. The committee normally consists of a Unit Leader, assistant/deputy Unit Leader, secretary and treasurer and larger Units may also add a fundraiser, quartermaster, training officer, Venturer liaison/recruitment officer, and other roles. Rovers are young adults and make their own decisions but frequently Units wish to have input and support from people over the age of 25, called Rover Advisers. These Advisers are selected by the Rover Unit, and usually re-endorsed by the Unit annually.

=== Region Rover Councils ===
The next step in the Rover organisation ladder is the Region Rover Council (RRC). These bodies run Rovering in their geographic areas and are typically based on the same Regions as the other sections of the Scouting Movement. These Regions can also run various Branch events on behalf of the Branch and run their own where all Rovers are invited. The application and practice of RRCs varies between the three states that operate them. In Victoria this level is known as a Rovering community and conduct few if any events and are primarily a social networking function with most co-ordination done at a Branch Rover Council level. Conversely in New South Wales, RRCs generally undertake several regional events a year and support their Units in running events and activities that are open to all Rovers. They operate bank accounts, conduct business, and hold an annual general meeting or annual report presentation.

There are currently RRCs in New South Wales, Queensland and Victoria which assist the Units in their Region by offering community involvement activities, organising social functions, distributing information, promoting training and the Baden-Powell Award and many other tasks. The smaller states without RRCs have their Units reporting directly to their Branch Rover Council.

=== Branch Rover Councils ===
The Branch Rover Council (BRC) is composed of representatives from each of the RRCs (in states that have them) or directly from Units and may also have representatives from sub-committees (for events, property, marketing, motorsport, etc.). This body approves Branch awards, co-ordinates training, liaises with other BRCs and the National Rover Council, develops policies and initiatives and encourages the further development of Rovering and the Rover program.

These bodies also communicate with their respective Branch organisations where the whole state is organised and BRCs send their elected members to represent Rover interests. BRC Commissioners and Chairs directly represent Rovers to the wider organisation in this way.

BRCs also have a number of sub-committees which organise various parts of Rovering life. These may include:

- management committees that run campsites and manage assets and property;
- event committees, which organise some of the larger Rover events for Rovers in the Branch;
- Rover Motorsport is CAMS-affiliated but also the responsibility of the BRC;
- diversity and inclusion committees that help support members; and
- award approval committees for the conferring of Rover awards.

Some states have a Lone Rover Unit which accepts members from country or other areas where the nearest Unit is further than practical travel allows, or who cannot attend a regular Rover Unit due to work or other commitments. Currently New South Wales, Queensland and South Australia have 'Lones Units'.

=== National Rover Council ===
The Australian National Rover Council (NRC) governs Rovering at a national level, by assisting Branch Rover levels, and designs policy to affect Rovering as a whole in Australia. This team works together to develop a strategic plan and then implement this over the course of their elected year(s). They also liaise with the BRC Chairs and the Branch Commissioners/Advisers for Rovers (or their equivalent) in each state to help them with any issues, ideas or help that they may need plus implement any actions or policies that affect the whole nation.

The NRC core executive is composed of a chairperson, deputy chairperson, secretary and treasurer. Further members of the broader executive consist of the events and initiatives officer, advocacy officer, marketing and engagement officer, and leadership and development officer. NRC executive members are elected for a one-year term except the chair that serves a two-year term. Additional project and support officers are elected from time to time. The NRC meets as a whole at their annual meeting where each Branch sends a delegation, being their BRC Chair, one elected delegate, Branch Adviser (or equivalent) plus two observers.

The NRC Chair is a member of the Scouts Australia National Team and attends National Team and National Operations meetings and through direct participation at the highest level possible puts the "Rovers view" into Scouts Australia. Rovers is the only section with this direct access.

The NRC meets annually, usually in January, following the major event for the year (Jamboree, Venture, or Moot). The conference runs over three days and incorporates state/territory reports, discussions and workshops as well as networking activities. BRC Chairs, their delegates and observers get to meet with Rovers from other states and share their knowledge and ideas and learn from one another. It is also an opportunity for states to put forward papers, plans and ideas to the NRC to be voted upon so the chair can then take the resolutions to the National Operations Meeting. Elections for the year's executive take place at this time too.

== Awards ==
=== Baden-Powell Scout Award ===
The Baden-Powell Scout Award (B-P Award), is the peak award in Rovers. It encourages participation, assistance and leadership, gaining outdoor adventure skills, special interests and undertaking an adventurous journey and a personal development or leadership course. The award certificates are signed in facsimile by the Chief Scout of Australia. Award recipients in states usually receive the award from the state governor, (Northern Territory Rovers may receive theirs from the Territory Administrator and ACT Rovers may receive theirs from the Governor-General) as a part of their Branch's annual or bi-annual awards presentation.

=== Adult Recognition Awards ===
The National Rover Service Award is an adult recognition award presented for outstanding contribution of lasting impact to the Rover Section over a sustained period of at least five years' by a Rover and ten years' by a Rover Adviser, leader or other supporter.

In four states, the National Rover Service Award is named to recognise the contribution to Rovering in that state by an early leader:

State	Picture	Award name	Contribution
Victoria	W. F. Waters on the Bogong High Plain	W. F. Waters Rover Service Award	Victorian Headquarters Commissioner for Rovers, 1930–1965; Victorian Commissioner for Rover Training, 1965–1968; Moot Chief, 7th World Moot in Melbourne (1961); Founder of the Alpine Rover Crew and Bogong Rover Chalet; Australian Contingent Leader to 5th World Moot in Kandersteg (1953); Standardised Squire Training; Established the Rover Lodge at Mount Baw Baw Village; Established the Rover Memorial Chalet at Warburton
New South Wales		Stan Bales Rover Service Award	NSW Branch Commissioner for Rovers, 1955–1978; A Deputy Moot Chief at the 7th World Moot in Melbourne; Moot Chief for the 6th Australian National Rover Moot held in Sydney in 1974/75
South Australia		Henry Rymill Award	Past Chief Commissioner and Rover Commissioner in South Australia; A dominant force in establishing Rovers within South Australia.
Western Australia		Ian Jennings Rover Service Award	Branch Commissioner for Rovers for 17 years. District Commissioner, Scout Shop Manager, Scouts WA Board Member, Leader Trainer, Branch Commissioner Adult Training and Development and Branch Commissioner Youth Program. Jennings was WA's first recipient of the Rover Service Award, which is now named in his memory.

== Events ==
Rovers run an Australian Rover Moot every three years which is open to Rovers, Guides and 18 to 25 year olds from Scouting organisations around the world.

During 2005 and 2006, the Centenary of Scouting Peace Boomerang completed a journey of over 18,000 km around Australia spreading a message of peace and unity leading up to the Scouting 2007 Centenary.

In 2018 many events and celebrations took place to mark the centenary of the Rover section, nationally this included a uniform badge and the sharing of rover history with states hosting formal dinner balls, placing time capsules, reunions, and many local events.

=== Motorsport ===
Motorsport clubs exist in several states and are the bodies responsible for the safe operation of car racing. They are Confederation of Australian Motorsport (CAMS)-affiliated racing clubs, with strict drink-driving, safety and racing policies. They are operated by an elected and assigned team of Rovers and are under the control of that states Branch Rover Council. They oversee events like Mudbash (Vic.), Sandblast (SA), Banana Bash (Qld), and Bush Baja and Badgi Bash events (WA).

All Rover Motorsport activities were stopped in the early 2000s because of a loss of insurance, but a new affiliation with the CAMS led to the resumption of Rover Motorsport. Victoria successfully ran its inaugural championship series in 2008/2009 and South Australia running its own five-round series in 2011, Queensland's Banana Bash has faced similar insurance problems to the point a few year's events were run without actual motorsport racing taking place but as of 2012 vehicles have returned.

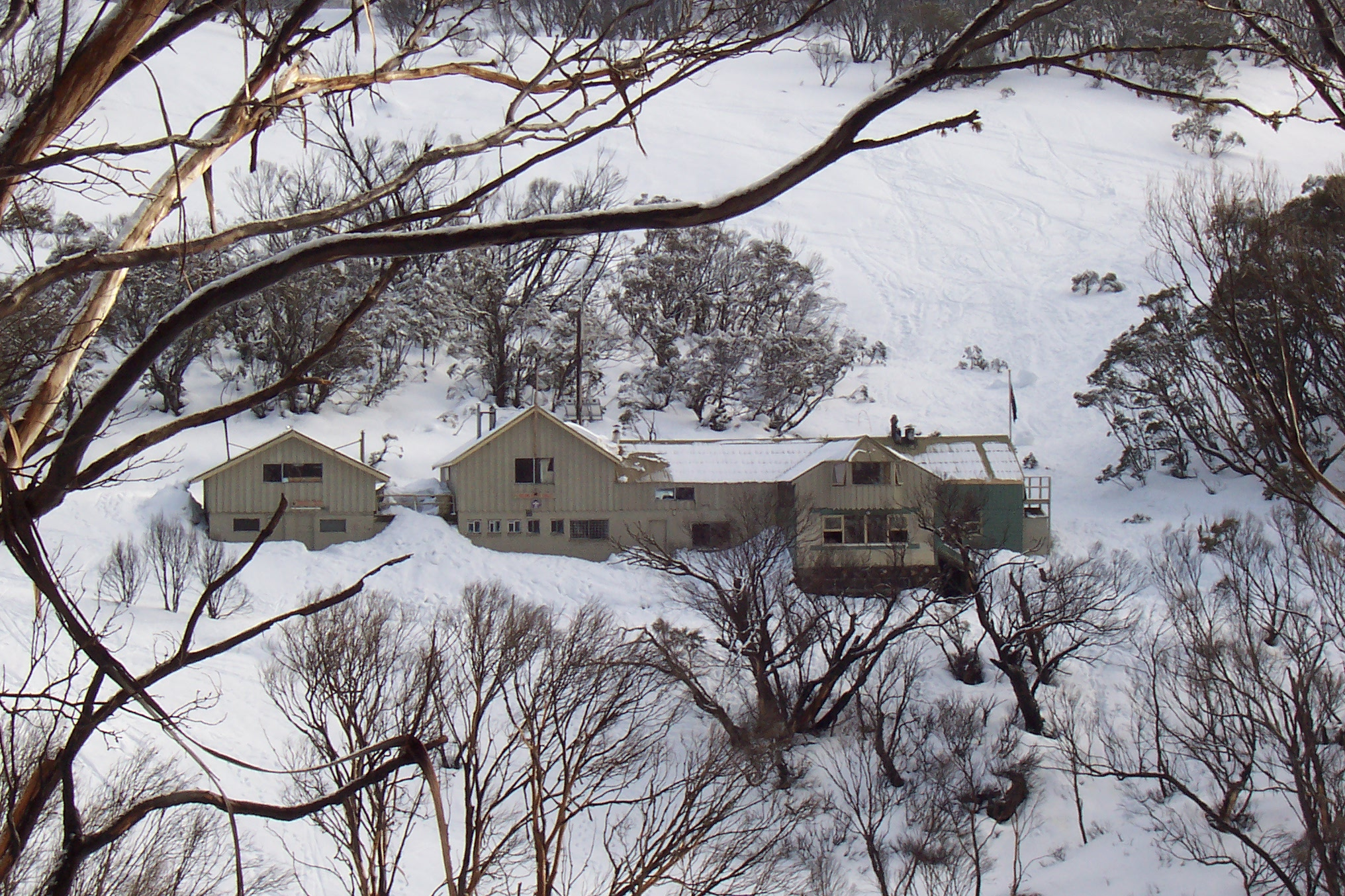
The Bogong Rover Chalet on the Bogong High Plains is one example of property owned and managed by Rovers

== Rover property ==
Rovers maintain and manage a number of properties. The Victorian Branch Rover Council, through a committee, manages properties built and funded by the Rovers, including two ski lodges and Mafeking Rover Park which are used by scouts and rovers, some from other states. During Summer months the Bogong Chalet is maintained and supplied by rovers, mainly from Victoria.

Carr Villa ski lodge on Ben Lomond, Tasmania was built and is owned and funded by a local Unit.

== Notable alumni ==
- Shane Jacobson (b. 1970), actor, television presenter, comedian, director and writer. Chief Scout of Victoria since at least 2021.
- Dave O'Neil (b. 1965), comedian, actor, writer, television and radio presenter and bass player
- Dick Smith (b. 1944), businessman and adventurer, and recipient of the Baden-Powell Award in 1966.
- W. F. Waters (1897–1968), Victorian State Rover Commissioner 1930–1965. The first scout leader to run a World Scouting event in the Southern Hemisphere.

== See also ==
- Rovering in Victoria
