= Rovering in Victoria =

Rover Scouts Victoria
- Age range: 18–25
- Headquarters: Victorian Rover Centre
- Location: Oakleigh East, Melbourne
- Country: Australia
- Affiliation: Scouts Victoria
Previous; Venturers	
- Website www.vicrovers.com.au

Rover Scouts Victoria is part of Scouts Victoria. The Rover section in Victoria has a long history, stretching all the way back to the publication of Rovering to Success in November 1922. The first records of Rover Scouting in Victoria report 81 rovers. In 2024, Scouts Victoria reported there were 1,143 registered rovers in Victoria, in roughly 100 units.

== Early years ==
During World War I, Baden-Powell turned his mind to how Scouting could support the development of the young men who had served. Rules for Rover Scouts, published September 1918 was the first attempt to organise this older section of the Movement, followed by the two-part Notes on the Training of Rover Scouts in April and November 1920. The section was firmly established when Baden-Powell published Rovering to Success to encourage young men to join the section, inspiring them with tales of chivalry, knighthood, and his own adventures in manhood and outdoor adventures.

In 1922, there were 80 rover scouts registered in Victoria, under the leadership of Rover Commissioner A. L. Shattell. Shattell presented the rovers a shield which became the prize for an annual hiking competition named in honour of Matthew Lance Evans of South Melbourne, a notable Rover Scout in those early days. (Evans had enlisted and was killed in action during The Great War on 18 September 1918 in France, aged about 23; the award was to the rover with the highest points from an annual hike.) Starting in 1925, with four rovers, by 1928, over 70 rovers were expected to compete the hike over a mountainous and wooded district, and held around Easter or the 'Eight Hours weekend'. The location and 30–35 miles (48–56 km) route was usually kept secret until the commencement of the trip, although 1933 included Lake Mountain.

The rovers were then led briefly by Tom Russell, the founder of Gilwell Park, Gembrook for a short time before Mr A. E. Currey was appointed Headquarters Commissioner for Rovers in 1923. Bill Waters first became involved with Rover Scouts Victoria in 1927, when he was called upon by the Chief Scout of Victoria, Lord Somers, to assist in the organisation of a series of hikes in Gippsland. Following these successes, Waters was asked to manage the Matthew Evans Competition Hike, and he was soon appointed Assistant Headquarters Commissioner for Rovers.

== Bill Waters era ==
May 1930 saw the reorganising of the rover section within Victoria, 'to bring the rover into the movement, and make him an essential part of it'.

In 1930 W. F. "Bill" Waters was appointed Headquarters Commissioner for Rovers. The brief he received from Chief Commissioner of Victoria Charles Hoadley was to use his experiences with the Melbourne Walking Club and Ski Club of Victoria to build up the outdoor side of Rover Scouting. At this time, the section’s major activity was the Matthew Evans Shield competition hike with rover crews largely left to their own devices at other times. The crews at this time tended to be mostly social clubs, with little attention paid to the development of individual rovers. There was no systematic approach to the training of rover squires, and there was very little support provided to rover leaders to implement proper rover activities.

Waters led efforts to build interest in more challenging outdoor activities by leading expeditions to hike, ski, surf, and rock climb. This ‘fixture card’ of activities was first published in the July 1930 issue of Victorian Scout, and soon other activities were added to the fixture card like working bees at Gilwell Park, social activities, and training courses to develop skills and a feeling of esprit de corps amongst the rovers. When the headquarters team began to organise private transport, attendances increased as rovers took advantage of the opportunity to take their adventures further afield and explore exciting new areas of the state.

By 1936, the activities on the Fixture Card were so popular, that the Rover Leaders' Advisory Council decided each rover would be expected to attend six of these weekend adventures each year – with at least two hikes, a skiing trip, and a working bee. Beyond this, they were also expected to attend their own crew and district activities.

=== Rover Skiing ===
Waters was a passionate skier, and the first skiing activity he ran for the rovers was in May 1931, in Mooroolbark. This training day was followed up by a trip of 65 rovers from as far afield as Ballarat to Mount Donna Buang, and in 1932 the first Rover Winter Parties began on the Bogong High Plains. Skiing quickly became a signature activity of the Victorian Rover Scouts, and in addition to operating a range of ski tours, the organisation acquired a collection of ski equipment as well as the plans for members to construct their own. A special rover skiing uniform was also developed, consisting of long dark blue trousers and scout belt; green flannel shirt with long sleeves and collar, scout scarf, normal rover badges and shoulder knot, peaked ski cap, with tenderfoot badge in front and R.S. hat bar above it.

==== Bogong Rover Chalet ====
Bogong Rover Chalet
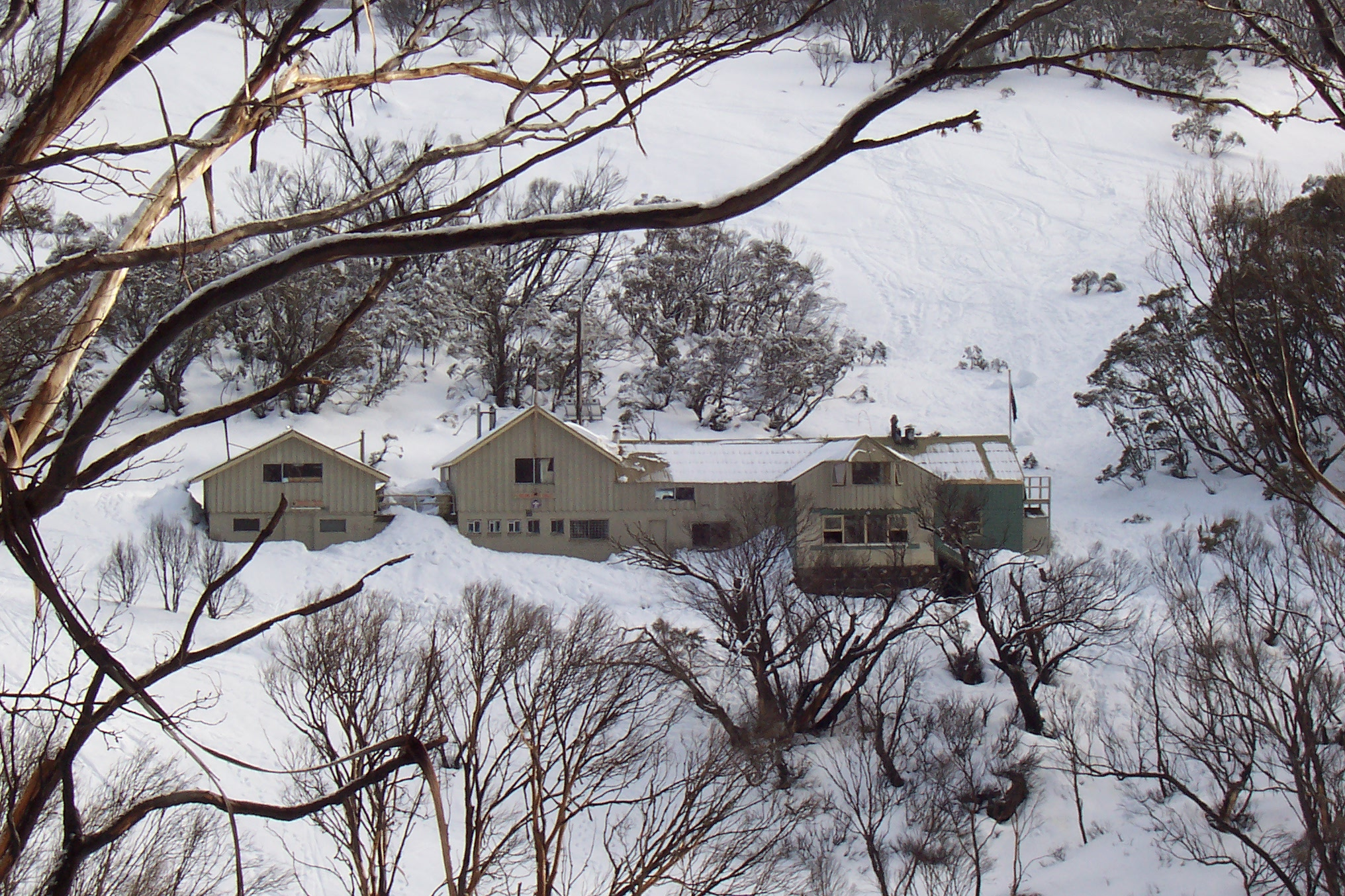
- Owner: Alpine Rover Crew; Victorian Rover Council
- Location: Alpine National Park
- Coordinates: 36°54′14″S 147°18′11″E
- Founded: 1940
- Founder: W. F. Waters

On the Bogong High Plains, Rover Skiing was originally based at Cope Hut, but soon proved so popular they expanded to house rovers at Wallace's Hut from 1937. Wallace's Hut was later taken over by the State Electricity Commission of Victoria (SEC) and developed to provide accommodation during the early stages of construction for the Kiewa Hydroelectric Scheme. When the SEC returned the hut to the lessee, Rover Scouts Victoria purchased the chimney and iron roof they had installed to prevent these essential facilities being removed. The rovers continued to maintain Wallace's Hut for decades, until the area became of the Alpine National Park.

As the Rover Winter Parties continued to grow, the rovers decided to build their own hut to avoid monopolising the little accommodation available in the area. By 1940, £700 (£300 of which had been donated by Eric Mockler-Ferryman after joining the rovers for a Winter Party in 1938), had been raised and Waters selected a site between Cope Hut and Wallace's Hut where the Bogong Rover Chalet was constructed using volunteer labour over the course of several weekends. Since being constructed, the chalet has been extended several times and it now has facilities to accommodate 35 people in comfort. The Chalet operates on the patrol system, with each participant responsible for a range of tasks to keep the winter party running smoothly.

The early rovers to complete a Winter Party were invested into the Bogong Rover Crew, but since 1940, rovers and adults who complete a Winter Party have instead joined the Alpine Rover Crew. The Bogong Rover Crew continues to exist as an honorary organisation consisting of people who have made substantial contributions to the development and running of the Chalet. Since 2000, Venturer Scouts who complete a Venturer Ski Week at the Chalet have been invested into the Alpine Venturer Unit.

The Bogong Rover Chalet is operated by the Bogong Chalet Management Group on behalf of the Victorian Rover Council.

==== J. W. McMahon Ski Lodge ====
J. W. McMahon Ski Lodge
- Location: Baw Baw National Park
- Coordinates: 37°53′9″S 146°21′21″E
- Founded: 1937
- Founder: Yallourn Rover Crew

Skiing was also taken up by the rovers in Gippsland. The Yallourn Rover Crew began to ski the Baw Baw Plateau, and during the 1930s they cut the first ski runs in the Mushroom Rocks area. In 1938, the crew built their own ski hut for accommodation at the Mushroom Rocks Campsite. It was officially opened in July 1940. After the hut was initially constructed, the kitchen was extended during the 1960s and additional loft accommodation was added in the early 1970s. The initial construction was funded by the grateful parents of two children who had gone missing in the area and were found by the rovers.

J. W. 'Johnny' McMahon was Yallourn Rover Crew's Rover Scout Leader during the 1930s, and this hut is also known as the Captain Hurley Rover Hut, following the Yallourn Rover Crew's move to Morwell. Frank Hurley (1885–1962) was a photographer and adventurer.

==== Rover Memorial Chalet ====
Rover Memorial Chalet, Warburton
- Owner: Scouts Victoria
- Location: Warburton, Victoria
- Coordinates: 37°44′37″S 145°42′29″E
- Founded: 1949
- Founder: W. F. Waters

As World War Two began to draw towards its close, discussions began to be had about a suitable memorial to those rovers who had died during the conflict. £110 were raised by November 1945 when the property was purchased, with over £200 raised by May 1946. However, postwar building restrictions meant that the building was not completed until 1949.

While the rovers had been using a former logging hut on Cement Creek track close to the summit of Mount Donna Buang for over 15 years, they only enjoyed the use of the memorial chalet for a short time. The snowfall on this mountain was always erratic, and access to the Victorian ski fields was increasing. During the 1970s, responsibility for the facility was transferred to the East Suburban Area which mainly used it to deliver training courses and cub scout pack holiday activities.

No longer managed by rover scouts the Rover Memorial Chalet is now known as the Warburton Trails Adventure Centre, a venue for mountain biking activities and occasional winter snowplay.

==== W. F. Waters Lodge ====
W. F. Waters Rover Ski Lodge
- Owner: Baw Baw Rover Crew; Victorian Rover Council
- Location: Mt Baw Baw Apine Village
- Coordinates: 37°50′25″S 146°15′50″E
- Founded: 1967
- Founder: W. F. Waters

After starting skiing in the Mount Erica area in the 1930s, rovers began to ski around Mount Baw Baw from c. 1946. As the area began to rise in popularity, Waters negotiated with the owners of Neulyne's Mill, located at what is now the entrance to the modern alpine resort, to use the Mill's accommodation on weekends during the winter. Starting from 1952, Rover Scouting on the mountain was based in the mill buildings. However, the mill was gradually being converted into car parks for the growing resort.

In 1964, when the Alpine Village was established, a site was allocated to the rovers and after receiving a grant and a loan from Scouts Victoria, the W. F. Waters Rover Ski Lodge was opened in time for the 1967 ski season. Since then, the Lodge has been substantially expanded, increasing capacity from 16 to 35. The Lodge also maintained a day visitor's room to facilitate ski and snowplay activities by Scouting and Guiding groups until Scouts Victoria acquired the former Baw Baw Ski Association building at the other end of the village, now the Scout Alpine Adventure Centre.

The W. F. Waters Lodge is operated by the Baw Baw Management Group on behalf of the Victorian Rover Council.

=== Service ===
Baden-Powell created Rover Scouts as a fellowship of the open air and service, while Waters believed a dedication to service was one of Scouting's most important principles. He pioneered a number of service initiatives, from the working bees at Gilwell Park and the Bogong Rover Chalet, to more advanced projects.

==== Frankston Jamboree ====
Rovers played many important roles in the first Australian Scout Jamboree in Frankston in 1934/35. The event took place during the Great Depression when Frankston was still a seaside resort town. Rovers were employed to clear and develop the jamboree site in the lead-up to the event, but also volunteered at the event itself to run activities, the hospital, and many other functions required for the event to operate.

The most important contribution from the section towards the event was the jamboree hikes, the last activity of the jamboree. Seven-hundred and fifty Scouts took part in the hikes, led by 108 rovers, while other rovers staffed the expedition headquarters and field hospital at Powelltown, as well as their own fire observers on Mount Donna Buang and Spion Kop. Other rovers were engaged full-time with providing communications between the parties and expedition headquarters, which was a serious challenge at the time. The major obstacle however, was that while some of the area had been mapped by the military or the Forestry Commission, around 30% of the area that the hiking parties were to travel through was uncharted.

Over the course of four months, rovers spent every weekend travelling out to the area with prismatic compasses and theodolites to survey it. Their information, as well as the information from the existing government maps were combined at Rover HQ. The master rover map was the basis of maps of the upper Yarra valley for decades to come.

During the hikes, Baden-Powell resided at The Lodge in Gilwell Park and when the hike parties made it to the campground, he presided over a campfire. At this campfire, Baden-Powell praised the work of the Victorian Rovers in running the jamboree. Baden-Powell made special mention of the hike program, calling them one of the best features of any jamboree he had attended.

Baden-Powell would later write the Frankston Jamboree hikes were the biggest series hikes he'd seen organised outside the British Army, while Waters also wrote that believed Baden-Powell had presented him with the Silver Acorn award largely in recognition of the jamboree hike program.

==== Hut Service Section ====
The Rovering community's interest in the outdoors grew, and from 1936 they began to take an interest in maintaining the twenty abandoned huts at old sawmill sites in what is now the Yarra Ranges National Park, the forested mountains between Warburton and Powelltown. These huts were within easy walking distance of each other and therefore were popular with scouts and other bushwalkers. This area had been mapped by the rovers in preparation for the jamboree hiking program.

The scheme was well appreciated by the Forests Commission of Victoria and the mill owners, while the huts' visitors' books were full of praise as well. The rover crews which took on responsibilities for these huts were expected to maintain their hut, visit it regularly, and report on its condition to the Chief Warden at Rover Scout Headquarters. They also provided visitors' books, firewood and some basic utensils for people staying at the hut. Sadly, most of these huts were destroyed during the 1939 Black Friday bushfires.

The Rovers of the Ballarat area also maintained a hut in the Pyrenees during this time.

=== Leadership ===
During the early years of Rovering, the section was led by rover scout leaders and rover commissioners, with some assistance from the rover mates. An organisation structure had existed from the launch of Victorian Rovering in 1921, but on 7 December 1932, Deputy Chief Commissioner Anderson constituted the Rover Leaders' Advisory Council, which met quarterly and consisted of the rovers leaders from each rover crew (country crews were allowed to appoint proxies to represent their interests). The council met at Scout Headquarters, and advised the Chief Commissioner (through the Headquarters Commissioner for Rovers) on the operation of the Rover section.

Where needed, rovers were organised on a more local basis through district rover councils. These bodies included the district commissioner as president, were chaired by the senior rover scout leader, and included the rover leader and rover mate from each crew. These district bodies organised a few activities each year without interfering in the operation of the crews.

The approach to leadership was that the rover leader was the managing director of the rover crew, while the rover mate was the foreman. The rover leader was responsible for squire training of the new members, while the rover mate took charge of delivering the crew's program during their term; which lasted for approximately a year.

==== Training ====
A specific training course was developed for rover leaders and rover mates in 1939, this course was a key driver that allowed the section to continue through World War II. While rover scout Leaders went to war, or moved to the younger sections in the absence of their regular leaders, the rover mates stepped up to manage the rover crews; foreshadowing the changes coming to Rover Scouting in the 1970s.

Twenty-two training courses were held over the first ten years of the program, attended by over 600 trainees. The course covered the theory and practice of rover scouting and prepared the attendees to manage their crews effectively. The course was also shared with rovers in other parts of Australia and the world.

=== Seventh World Moot (1961/1962) ===
Hosted by Victorian Rovers at Wonga Park, greater Melbourne, between 27 December 1961 and 6 January 1962, the 7th World Rover Moot was the first world scout event to be held in the Southern Hemisphere. The event was attended by 970 rover scouts from all Australian states and 15 other countries.

Waters was the Moot Chief, the man responsible for overseeing the operation of the entire event. With a team of leaders from across Victoria and Australia, Waters worked for two years to create an event that would set a new standard for rover moots in Australia and around the world.

Seventh World Rover Moot Council
Moot Role	Name	Normal scouting role
Moot Chief	W. F. Waters	Headquarters Commissioner for Rovers; Scouts Victoria
Moot Administrative Commissioner	Colonel E. R. E. Black OBE	General Secretary; Scouts Victoria
No. 1 Subcamp Chief	W. L. Williams	
No. 2 Subcamp Chief	F. R. Watson	
No. 3 Subcamp Chief	E. M. Derrick	
No. 4 Subcamp Chief	A. Keeble	
Administration Services
1st Deputy Moot Chief	Roy Driver	Assistant Headquarters Commissioner for Rovers; Scouts Victoria
Asst. Moot Chief – Secretary	M. Brown	
Asst. Moot Chief – Quartermaster	Lt Col. D. J. Edgar	
Asst. Moot Chief – Victualing	T. Wallace	
Asst. Moot Chief	R. W. McKellar	
Publicity, Activities and Maintenance Services
2nd Deputy Moot Chief	Wally Watts	Assistant County Commissioner for Rovers; Hoadley County, Scouts Victoria
Asst. Moot Chief – Activities	A. Blair	
Asst. Moot Chief – Transport	G. Clarke	
Asst. Moot Chief – Sites and Services	A. Jackson	
Moot Marshal	M. Hough	
Welfare Services
3rd Deputy Moot Chief	Stan Bales	Headquarters Commissioner for Rovers; Scouts Australia NSW
Asst. Moot Chief – Billeting	A. G. T. Grant	
Asst. Moot Chief – Camp Accommodation	M. Johnston	
Asst. Moot Chief – Fraternity	E. Sargeant	
Expeditions
Assistant Moot Chief – Expeditions	Ivan Stevens	Assistant Headquarters Commissioner for Rovers; Scouts Victoria
Personnel	Ivan Fox	
Transport	E. Sandbach	
Routes	George Tanck	
Leaders	Ivan Fox	
Communications	J. Turner	

For the first time, the moot program included a total of 48 different four-day expeditions to locations across Victoria, including Anglesea, the Bogong High Plains, the Buchan Caves, Lake Eildon, and Mount Buffalo. One whole day was set aside for participants to provide service to the community. Some of the service that was completed by the moot included clearing the Puffing Billy Railway line from Belgrave to Menzies Creek, clearing the grounds of the Adult Deaf and Dumb Home in Blackburn, building kennels and runs at the Lady Nell Seeing Eye Dog School and painting the Guide Hut at Clifford Park.

The 1962 bushfires swept through the moot site on 16 January (only nine days after the moot ended) and many of the rover huts, other outbuildings, and even the landowners' garden, were destroyed in the blaze.

Following successful completion of the moot, Waters was invested with the Silver Wolf. The simple ceremony took place at the main flagpole at Surfmoot 1961 in the presence of his friends, and around 350 rovers who had been a part of the moot. The award was presented by then Chief Scout of the British Commonwealth, Charles Maclean.

=== Surfmoot ===
The traditional opening to the rover year, Surfmoot started in 1931 when a group of Geelong Rovers invited a number of Melbourne crews to Anglesea for a surfing camp. Since at least 1946, the event has been held over the Australia Day weekend. From 1931 to 1947, the event was held at the Geelong District campsite. Following a bushfire destroying the site, Surfmoot was held on the Anglesea Foreshore for several years before moving to Eumerella Scout Camp in 1953, where it has remained ever since (with three exceptions). In 1983, the Ash Wednesday Bushfires caused the event to be moved to Bay Park and in 2003 and 2004 it was held at the Phillip Island Grand Prix Circuit.

Activities at Surfmoot include a waterslide and Super Tub racing. Night entertainment often includes bands, DJs and themed parties. There are also off-site activities run in the surrounding areas.

== Later 20th century ==
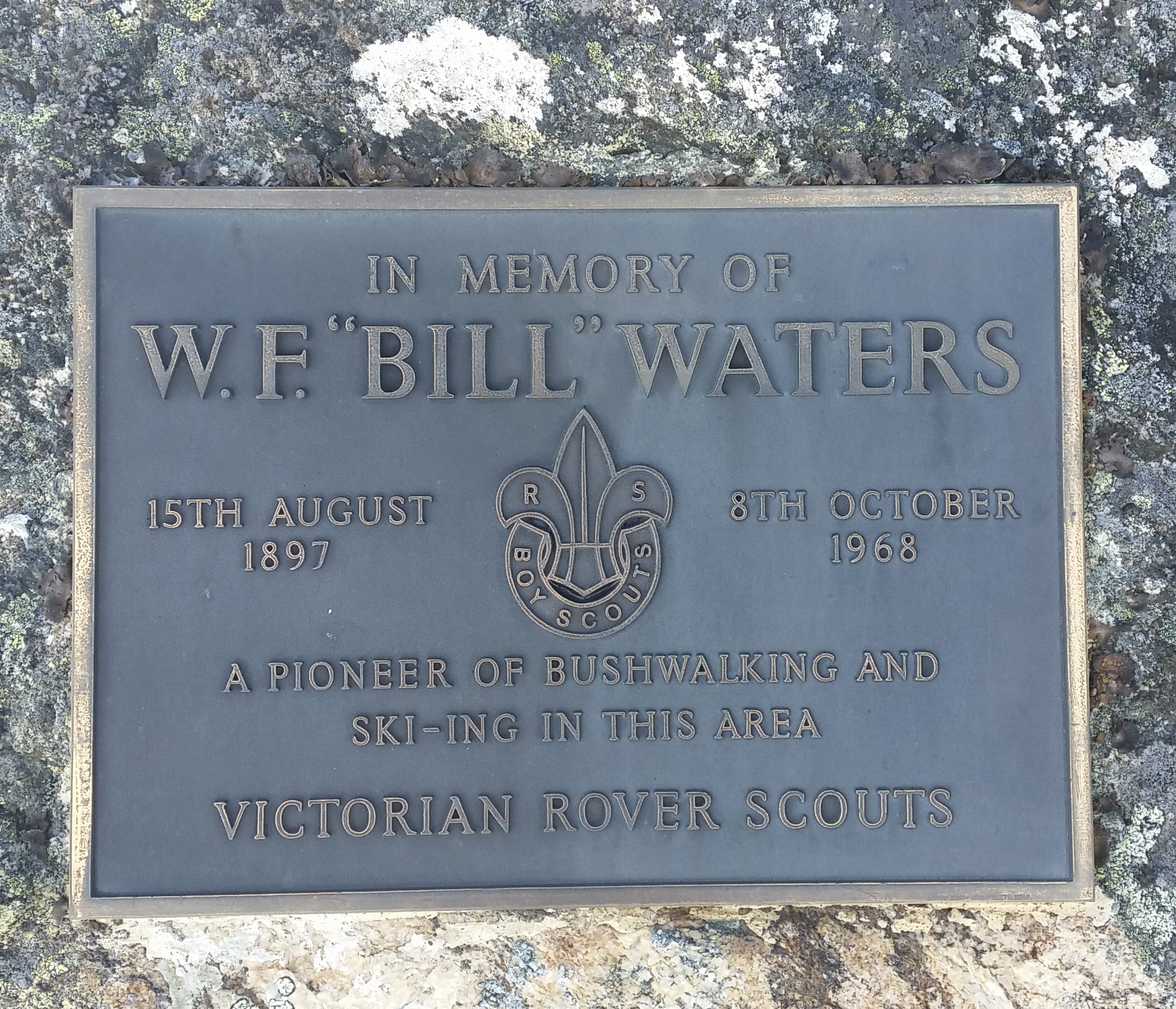
Memorial plaque dedicated to Waters on the Bogong High Plains

The Waters era of Victorian Rovering began to end in 1965 when he was asked to step down in favour of a younger man, by Chief Commissioner Rolf McKellar. The 68-year-old Waters was appointed Commissioner for Rover Training and Warden of Rover Campsites. and retained an active outdoorsman and supporter of Rover Scouting until his death in 1968. Less than three weeks before suffering a fatal heart attack, Waters had been leading a Rover Winter Party on the Bogong High Plains and his ashes were released at Investiture Point, the closest point to the Bogong Rover Chalet at which it is possible to see Mount Bogong, in a ceremony attended by hundreds of current and former rovers.

Following the 7th World Moot, Rover Scouting was on a global downturn. After the UK released The Chief Scout's Advance Party Report in 1966, the organisation undertook a range of changes, most critically, the rover scout section ceased in the UK. At the same time, the new Scout Association of Australia made their own investigations into what the future of the organisation should look like. The 'Design for Tomorrow' Committee made its report in 1970, recommending the abolition of Rover Scouting and its replacement with a new section called Pathfinders. Pathfinders was Rovering with all of its history and traditions removed. The traditional knighthood theme was to be discarded and the proposed "Pathfinder Units" had no replacement theme, resembling Rotary Clubs.

The proposal was rejected by rover scouts, and there was an extensive campaign against the abolition of the section; But there was widespread acceptance of the need to change. By 1975, new proposals to reform Rovering had been approved, and young women began to join rover crews.

=== Mudbash ===
Mudbash is one of the annual highlights of the Australian Rovering calendar. It was first organised by Endeavor Rover Crew in 1972 at the Big River Campsite in Marysville, and was attended by five vehicles. These vehicles are referred to as rover buggies, and while modern buggies (from 2006) comply with the requirements of Motorsport Australia, this first event was much more casual. Most notably, the original event rules recommended brakes were fitted to each vehicle.

The event is held annually in June over the Sovereign's Official Birthday long weekend. Events in the early years included a tug-of-war between vehicles, the hill climb, an obstacle course, and a night rally. As the event has professionalised, many of these events have fallen by the wayside and the modern event is now largely a series of motorkhana and khanacross tests.

Since 1976, the event has been run by Rover Scouts Victoria at a range of venues. During the 1980s, more than 50 vehicles and 2,000 people participated in the event at Big River Campsite. Mudbash began organising working bees as part of event entry to offset the damage caused to the park during the event. In 1989, the event shifted to private property in Ballan while the rovers searched for a "Mudbash site" which still hosts the event today.

Mudbash has become a fixture on the Victorian Scouting calendar, with more than 1,500 people attending over the course of the weekend. Rover crews from across Australia and New Zealand enter the competition, and individuals from as far as Europe and Canada have attended the event in recent years. The Mudbash Open Day on Sunday is a major promotion for Rover Scouts Victoria both within and outside Scouting.

=== Eighth World Moot (1990/1991) ===
In the years since the 7th World Moot, international events for young adult scouts were limited. "Moot years" were held every four years in an effort to provide some level of international Scouting for this age group. During these years, rovers were encouraged to travel to attend moots in other countries.

In the mid-1980s, as Australia began preparations to host the 16th World Scout Jamboree in Sydney, Victorian Rovers began to agitate for the return of rover moots to the World Scouting calendar. Australia also hosted the 31st World Scout Conference in Melbourne, and the Victorian Rovers took advantage of this opportunity to campaign for the return of world moots. The proposal was approved, and Rover Scouts Victoria hosted the 8th World Moot at Gilwell Park, Gembrook over the 1990/91 new year period. One thousand Scouts from 36 countries attended the moot.

A number of facilities were added by the rovers to the campsite in preparation for the event, including the John Ackerly Shelter and major enhancements and enlargement of the campfire hollow, which was renamed the Norman Johnson Campfire Circle during the Moot.

=== Mafeking Rover Park ===
Mafeking Rover Park
- Owner: Mafeking Rover Park Committee; Victorian Rover Council
- Location: Caveat, Victoria
- Coordinates: 37°04′0″S 145°30′29″E
- Founded: 1992
- Founder: Mudbash Committee

Mafeking Rover Park is a campground which is fully owned and operated by the Victorian Rover Council was originally anticipated as a home for Victorian Rover Scout Motorsport. Located 32 kilometres (20 mi) from Yea, it is a 130 hectares (320 acres) mix of open land and scrub. The park is named for the Siege of Mafeking held by the later-Chief Scout Baden-Powell. Although it is called a Rover Park, its use is open to all scout sections, and others who wish to hire it.

Mafeking's facilities include a four-cargo-container-tall abseiling tower, commando, orienteering and nine-hole golf courses. Lake Surfmoot provides an area for canoeing, and there are numerous walking tracks. Accommodation is offered in the troop hall, bunkhouses, and campsites. There are numerous motorsport-related facilities with well-maintained tracks that are set up in compliance with the requirements of the Motorsport Australia.

The site is home to a large variety of Australian fauna and flora, such as kangaroos, koalas, swap wallabies, possums, bats, as well as a multitude of lizards, frogs, birds and fish. Local indigenous plants are used at Mafeking, both from propagated species collected from the local area, and through revegetation efforts.

Mafeking hosted the 14th Australian/10th Asia-Pacific Rover Moot over the 1998/99 New Year's period, and much of the site infrastructure, including the major building on the site, the Harold Gardiner Crew Hall, was developed at this time. It also hosted the 20th Australian Rover Moot in 2017.

=== Rogaining ===
The sport of rogaining was invented by the members of Surrey Thomas Rover Crew. The word 'rogaining' is derived from the names of three of the founders, Rod Phillips, Gail Davis (née Phillips), and Neil Phillips (RoGaiNe). The name was formally adopted by the Victorian Rogaining Association at its inaugural annual general meeting in August 1976 and accepted by Scouts Australia and University bushwalking groups to give the new sport an identity in its own right.

The Surrey Thomas Rover Crew was formed in 1971 in Brighton, Australia. Soon after forming, the crew undertook to run an annual twenty-four-hour cross-country navigation event. At the first Surrey-Thomas twenty-four-hour rogaine in 1972, forty starters, mostly from Scouting, set off from Gembrook and circled the base camp at Basan's Corner via a series of loops along forest roads. True cross-country navigation was minimal, but the publicity from the event and the emphasis placed on quality base camp service and a friendly atmosphere was sufficiently popular that there was a demand for similar events over the next two years. These were followed by an important shift to an all cross-country score event set at Yea in 1975, the first such event in the world catering for the general public.

=== Leadership ===
During the 1970s, Rover Scouting went through a major change, the introduction of self-governance. Rover leaders stepped back to become rover advisors. Rover mates became crew leaders. The section began to lead itself. From 1978, the Victorian Rover Council (then the Victorian Branch Rover Council) was established under the chairmanship of Branch Commissioner for Rovers Harold Gardiner. As the self-governance model was established, the rovers began to elect one of their own to chair the meeting and lead Rover Scouts Victoria.

== See also ==
- Scouting and Guiding in Victoria
- Rovers (Australia)
