= Australian Rover Moot =

Australian youth movement activity

Australian Rover Moots are the major national Scouts Australia outdoor event run by Rovers Scouts.

Activities include off-site excursions, overnight hikes, and acts of service.

== History ==
A Moot is a gathering of Rover Scouts (generally called Rovers); The Old English word "moot" means assembly or gathering. It was named by Robert Baden-Powell, the founder of the Scouting Movement in a letter to Percy Bantock Nevill who was charged with co-ordinating a gathering of Rovers at Royal Albert Hall, London in 1926. The 1928 Moot in Birmingham with now-Acting Chief Rover Commissioner Nevill had 1500 Rovers in attendance.

=== World Moots ===
The first World Rover Moot was held in 1931 at Kandersteg, Switzerland. The late-1939 Third World Rover Moot in Monzie, Scotland was attended by a number of Australian Rovers, including one who had the honour of piping up the flag on the castle keep.

World Rover Moots have also held in Melbourne, in 1961 (7th World) and 1990–91 (8th World).

=== Inaugural Australian Moots ===
Within Australia, various states initiated their own Moots, and in time, districts within a state.

- New South Wales – An annual Moot was underway, including at Warner's Bay on the weekend of 05–06 November 1927 opening with a campfire, discussing Rover structure and organisation, and a mock vigil; and 26–27 October 1929 at Pennant Hills.
- Queensland – The first state Moot was a camp held at Ipswich in early-May 1932, and discussed leadership, the meaning of service, and had a cross-country race. A later Moot was held at Samford from 11 to 13 June 1938.
- Victoria – First state Moot commenced on 19 November 1927 for the weekend in Melbourne. It was expected to have 400 state Rovers in attendance, with representatives from other states, 'which will have a far-reaching significance for the entire Movement in the Commonwealth' as one question sought to examine the exact role/status of a Rover. The October 1932 Moot was held on the grounds of Scotch College, Melbourne.
- South Australia – The first Moot commenced 23 April 1932, at a Stirling property in hike tents, organised by the new Assistant Commissioner for Rovers, with discussions, outdoor competitions, and a Scouts' own. The September 1937 Moot was known as the "Marine" Moot, with participants to supply their own tents, personal gear, and food sufficient for three meals and a supper. After the 1938 Moot, the first post-World War II Moot was at Glenalta on 29–30 November 1947.
- Western Australia – The first state Moot was held at Crawley in late 1926.

The Frankston Jamboree saw a Moot opened by Lord Baden-Powell at 3.30 pm on Saturday 12 January 1935, and continued until about 3.30 pm the following afternoon. Supplying one's own rations, reports were tabled, the meaning of Rover service examined, a Rovers' own speaker, the 'future of a Rover', and conference presentations from a number of Australian states and countries such as Ceylon, India, and British Malaya.

A joint Victorian and South Australian "Rover Easter Moot" was held in early-1948 in the Grampians, as preparation for the Melbourne 1948–1949 Pan-Pacific Boy Scout Jamboree. The Moot included hikes and informal discussions.

Australian Capital Territory held a Moot in mid-June 1982 at Canberry Fair, expecting up to 350 Rovers (many from NSW and Victoria), to celebrate the fiftieth year of Rovering in the territory. An 11–13 June 1988 ACT Moot expected 120 Rovers, with activities including iron-man, iron-woman, campfires, and fancy-dress bush dance.

=== National Moots ===
National Moots were established in 1951. They have since been held every three years, typically lasting from nine to eleven days each, and are run by each state on a rotating basis.

== List of Australian Rover Moots ==
No.	Name	Location	Dates	Participants	Notes
1	Jubilee Moot	Oatley Park, Sydney, New South Wales	26 December 1951 to 1 January 1952	700	This was the last official function for the State of NSW's jubilee year programme. Activities included open-air movie films, archery, gold-panning, cliff rescue demonstrations, decorated vehicle competition, and bush cricket matches. Contingents attended from New Zealand and New Guinea.
2	2nd Australian Rover Moot	Warburton, Victoria	December 1957 to January 1958		
3	3rd Australian Rover Moot	Barney Gorge, Queensland	28 December 1959 to 2 January 1960	180	Recent rains created challenges as the site could only be accessed by 4WD. Activities including hiking the 1,358 metres (4,455 ft) Mount Barney, swimming, wide games, spear throwing and boomerang throwing, and a campfire. At the conclusion of the Moot, there was a supper-dance at the Brisbane City Hall, with rangers from the Girl Guides.
4	4th Australian Rover Moot	Numinbah Valley, Queensland	28 December 1969 to January 1970	269	Each Moot group consisted of 15 Rovers and one Rover scouter. There were also 16 camp showers, a telephone to Moot HQ, a twelve-bed hospital, electrical power, a large waterhole floodlit at night capable of holding 300 people, and opportunities to visit the Gold Coast beaches. There was also a Moot scarf and every participant got two Moot badges.
5	5th Australian Rover Moot	University of Western Australia, Perth, Western Australia	December 1971 to January 1972		The Moot was opened by the Governor-General.
6	6th Australian Rover Moot	Sydney, New South Wales	December 1974 to January 1975		
7	It's a Moot Point, 7th Australian Rover Moot	YABAMAC Scout Camp, Upper Plenty, Victoria	28 December 1977 to 7 January 1978	c. 250	Rovers were organised into 12 Moot Crews. On 29 December, Crews 1 to 6 did a sports competition, with Crews 7 to 12 on 30 December: Badminton, darts, table tennis, volleyball, tennis, and basketball. Tours were conducted of Melbourne and surrounds, an air activities day, service of cleanup of a local cemetery and working at a tramway museum, New Year's Eve celebrations of the attending states and countries (including 24 New Zealand Rovers, 3 Canadians, 6 Indonesians, 2 Japanese, 6 Malaysians), four-day activities including coastal tours and hikes, and wrapped up with a discussion on new ideas for Rovering, and the sports competition play-offs. Also the 1st Asia-Pacific Rover Moot. YABAMAC was the Yarra-Bateman Area Memorial Activity Centre; The site was destroyed in the 2009 Black Saturday bushfires.
8	8th Australian Rover Moot	Baden-Powell Park, Samford, Queensland	December 1980 to January 1981		Also the 2nd Asia-Pacific Rover Moot.
9	9th Australian Rover Moot	Gowrie Park, Tasmania	29 December 1983 to 8 January 1984	860	Also the 4th Asia-Pacific Rover Moot. A special postage postmark was created for the Moot mail.
10	Bound for South Australia, 10th Australian Rover Moot	Woodhouse scout campsite, Piccadilly, South Australia	29 December 1986 to 9 January 1987	900	Activities included parachuting, gliding, hiking, scuba diving, and abseiling. This was also a "World Invitational" Moot, with contingents included from Canada, Indonesia, Japan, New Guinea, New Zealand, and Nordic countries; who also staged cultural displays.
11	Get caught in the ACT, 11th Australian Rover Moot	Camp Cotter, Canberra, Australian Capital Territory	December 1989 to January 1990		Also the 6th Asia-Pacific Rover Moot.
12	Go West and Discover, 12th Australian Rover Moot	Woodman Point, Perth, Western Australia	December 1992 to January 1993		Also the 7th Asia-Pacific Rover Moot.
13	the aNSWer, 13th Australian Rover Moot	Cataract Scout Park, Appin, Sydney, New South Wales	December 1995 to January 1996		Also the 8th Asia-Pacific Rover Moot.
14	YeaMoot, 14th Australian Rover Moot	Mafeking Rover Park, Yea, Victoria	December 1998 to January 1999		Also the 10th Asia-Pacific Rover Moot.
15	15th Australian Rover Moot	Landsborough, Queensland	December 2001 to January 2002		Also the 12th Asia-Pacific Rover Moot.
16	Tassiemoot, 16th Australian Rover Moot	National Rowing Centre, Lake Barrington, Wilmot, Tasmania	December 2004 to January 2005	600	Included five-day expeditions, and a Rover Youth Forum. About 100 Queensland Rovers attended.
17	AussieMoot, 17th Australian Rover Moot	Cataract Scout Park, Appin, Sydney, New South Wales	30 December 2007 to 12 January 2008		Moot theme was 'endless opportunities'. The event included a five-day expedition, as well as on-site and off-site activities. The event also hosted the 4th Australian Rover Youth Forum.
18	Ozmoot, 18th Australian Rover Moot	Woodhouse scout campsite, Piccadilly, South Australia	December 2010 to January 2011 (13 days)	303	Activities included house boating, water skiing, and hiking Kangaroo Island. The Moot also hosted the 5th Australian Rover Forum at the Woodhouse Activity Centre on 11 January 2011. Originally 600 Rovers expressed interest in attending, which created financial pressures (noting Victoria's SurfMoot a few weeks later attracted 800 Rovers).
19	WAM (Western Australian Moot), 19th Australian Rover Moot	Woodman Point Recreation Camp, Fremantle, Western Australia	30 December 2013 to 10 January 2014	464, and 125 staff	Mascots were Kev the Quokka and Nikki the Numbat. Expeditions included scuba diving at Pelican Point and Rottnest Island, rock climbing, caving, sky diving, and the 'Rotto Rampage'. Service activities included cleaning up the East Perth cemeteries. Participants included contingents from Canada, New Zealand, Pakistan, Singapore, and Sweden.
20	The Moot, 20th Australian Rover Moot	Mafeking Rover Park, Yea, Victoria	27 December 2016 to 6 January 2017	600	Over twenty expeditions across Victoria and Tasmania, including water activities, hiking, kayaking, and house boating.
21	CBR Moot, 21st Australian Rover Moot	Canberra, Australian Capital Territory	30 December 2019 to 10 January 2020	516, 110 of which were international	CBR is the abbreviation of Canberra, and also stood for 'Creating Better Rovers'. Also the 13th Asia-Pacific Rover Moot. Originally planned for Camp Cotter, the venue was moved to Trinity Christian School for Phase 1 (pre-expedition) two days before the Moot started: A second part (expeditions) of the Moot was cancelled due to uncertain fire conditions with the January bushfires (and the Moot tagline quipped as "Continually Being Relocated"). Activities were to include mountain biking, a Riverina experience, diving, and an Amazing Race-style expedition. The base fee was A$900 to attend.
22	AIM (Apple Isle Moot), 22nd Australian Rover Moot	Forth, Tasmania	31 December 2022 to 8 January 2023	520 Rovers, 80 staff	Activities included local food tours, 4WD tours, giant board games, disc golf course, cultural activities, Cradle Mountain hiking, and scuba diving.
23	Way Out West (WOW) Moot, 23rd Australian Rover Moot	Woodman Point Recreation Camp, Fremantle, Western Australia	31 December 2026 to 10 January 2027		The expedition component will see participants going afar as Esperance and Broome. The base fee is A$1000 to attend.

== Competition ==
The Eastman Trophy, presented by the Eastman Rover Crew from Palmerston North, New Zealand, in January 1978, is presented to the winner of a state-versus-state competition run during a Moot. It is made of wood.

The 2010–2011 Ozmoot activities included 10Ten cricket, watermelon rugby, chariot races, and four-way tug-of-war.

The 2013–2014 WAM events included chess, tug-o-war, and a relay race.

The 2019–2020 CBR Moot activities started with a scavenger hunt on opening night.

== See also ==
- Australian Scout Jamboree
- World Scout Moot
