= Baden-Powell Award =

Highest award achievable to Rover (adult) scouts

The Australian Baden-Powell Scout Award

The Baden-Powell Award, also known as the B-P Award or Baden-Powell Scout Award (BPSA), is the highest award achievable to Rover (adult) Scouts.

Although it has become a less common award as some Scout Associations no longer offer a Rover program, it is still awarded in several countries, including Australia, Brazil, Guatemala, Hong Kong, Malaysia, Singapore, South Africa, New Zealand, and in Traditional Scouting organizations in the United Kingdom and the United States.

Youth Girl Guides in Australia also have two awards named after Robert Baden-Powell, the Junior BP Award and BP Award, although neither is the highest award possible. The Baden Powell Challenge Award was the ultimate award for Guides in the United Kingdom until it was retired in the spring of 2019.

== Australia ==
=== Scouting ===
Prior to 2014, members of Rovers (Australia) were able to earn the Baden-Powell Scout Award through either of two methods, after completing their Rover Skills Badge, outlined below;

==== Method A ====
Method A is the more popular version of the Baden-Powell Scout Award, also known as the "Traditional" Method, as it is more clearly defined with targets for its badges.

| Scoutcraft | Service | Ramblers | Project |
|---|---|---|---|
| Organise & take part in at least 10 separate camps. Must be more than 10 nights camping, at more than three locations, showing a high standard of campcraft and keeping a log to show to the crew. | At least six months service to a community service organisation | Organise & lead a trip over at least four days (three nights), presenting a log to the crew of the trip. | Over six months, develop a skill, reporting to the Crew as you go. This skill should not be one that is involved in the Rover's work. |

==== Method B ====
Method B includes the Spiritual Development, Intellectual & Emotional Development, Social Development and Physical Development Badges.

| Spiritual Development Badge | Intellectual and Emotional Development Badge | Social Development Badge | Physical Development Badge |
|---|---|---|---|
| This area provides an opportunity for the Rover to find out a great deal about themselves through various avenues including their own lifestyle and personal values system. | Through this badge the Rover can explore a vast array of areas that may be unfamiliar to them, ultimately choosing one for further study for this badge. Areas include learning to play a musical instrument; getting involved in or learning about art drama, media or politics; or learning a foreign language.At least six months service to a community service organisation. | Again the Rover can explore a vast array of areas that may be unfamiliar but of interest to them, ultimately choosing one for personal development in order to gain this badge. | Here the Rover is challenged and must demonstrate initiative, and skills in expeditions and outdoor adventure. Some may undertake to organise, plan (including adequate preparation and training), and complete a one-week activity. |

==== New Baden-Powell Scout Award ====
At the start of 2014, a new version of the Baden-Powell Scout Award was introduced. All Rovers who had already started the old version of the award (Method A or Method B) were given the choice to either continue with the old award or transfer their completed badges to the new award scheme. The new Baden-Powell Scout Award is broken up into two levels: the St. George Award and the Baden-Powell Scout Award.

The St. George Award is made up of four badges: Squire Training, Rover Skills, Service and Physical. A Rover must complete the Squire Training badge before they can start any other badge, but most Rover Crews will have their new Rovers (Squires) complete this badge before they are fully invested into the Rover Crew.

| Squire Training | Rover Skills | Service | Physical |
|---|---|---|---|
| This badge includes Scoutcraft skills, service, camping, learning about the award scheme, Intro to Rovers, the Promise & Law, meetings and a small project for the Crew or its assets. | This badge includes holding a position of responsibility, going camping, and running activities for other Rovers. | This badge involves providing six or more months of regular, active service to a worthy cause. | This badge involves either participating in a physical or sporting activity for six months, or completing a physical journey over four days, or two weekends of over 48 hours' effort each. |

The Baden-Powell Scout Award involves the completion of four components: the St. George Award, the Community Development badge, the Personal Growth badge and the Self-Reflection Interview.

| St. George Award | Community Development Badge | Personal Growth Badge | Self-Reflection Interview |
|---|---|---|---|
| The four badges outlined above must be completed, and Rovers must have been Knighted/Fully Invested before they can be awarded the St George Award. | This badge aims to contribute to the development of your local, national, or international community. | This badge aims to encourage Rovers to explore their personal beliefs, challenge their thinking, or develop their own skills. | The self-reflection interview is there to help you think about your journey through the award scheme and reflect on what you have learnt along the way. The interview is facilitated by a member of the BPSA Support Team and will not consider if you have technically completed the required badgework. |

=== Guiding ===
In Girl Guides, participants have the option of completing two different awards of similar name, the Junior BP and the BP award. Both awards involve the completion of activities (chosen by the guide) in the following categories: Promise and Law, Outdoors, Patrol System, Service, World Guiding and Guiding traditions. In the Junior BP, Guides must complete a total of 12 activities, in the BP they must complete 18. In both awards, the Guide receives an Endeavor badge when they are halfway through. The Junior BP is not a prerequisite for earning the BP.

Youth members of Girl Guides may choose to undertake the Queen's Guide Award, which is the highest award a youth (under 18) Girl Guide can achieve. The junior BP or BP awards are good preparation for the peak award, but not essential to complete either to earn Queen's Guide.

Young Adult members of Girl Guides in Australia may choose to complete the Olave Baden Powell award. This is the peak achievement of award available to under Guides between ages 18–30 years.

== Canada ==
=== Baden-Powell Service Association ===
Canada's Baden-Powell Service Association does not have a centralized BPSA Body. Traditional Scouting programs are run by independent Provincial Associations in British Columbia, Alberta, Ontario and New Brunswick, each of which uses the B-P Award as its highest Rover award.

== Hong Kong ==
=== Scout Association of Hong Kong ===
Baden Powell Award continues the training progress of the Rover Scout Award. Self planning and managing are prerequisite to achieve this highest award. During the course from planning to operation, Rovers could equip themselves with a positive value of living, learning Scout knowledge, technique and attitude.

The topics of Baden Powell Award are same as the Rover Scout Award in which Service, Scoutcraft and Exploration are compulsory, whilst Scout Knowledge, Self-development, Interpersonal Skills, Personal Pursuit and Look Wide are optional. Rovers are required to take 3 amongst the 5 options for assessment.

The assessment of the Baden Powell Award is arranged by the RHQC (RS). Certificate and award will be issued when confirmed and approved by AHQ after the recommendation of Regional Commissioner and District Commissioner.

== Malaysia ==
=== Scouts Association of Malaysia ===
Baden-Powell Award (Malay: Anugerah Baden-Powell) or better known as B-P Award (Malay: Anugerah B-P) is the highest award of the Scouts Association of Malaysia (PPM) for a rover scout in Malaysia. To get this award, a rover scout must complete the rover scout training scheme. The conditions for obtaining this award are as follows:

1. Pass the rover scout badges, namely 3 compulsory badges (adventure badge, skills badge and service badge) and 1 optional badges (entrepreneurship badge, extreme badge, ICT badge, leadership badge, or life saver badge) respectively.

2. The rover scout that undergo the B-P Award's test must be between 18 and 25 years old only.

3. The B-P Award's nomination form will be provided by the Scouts Association of Malaysia's headquarters.

4. The rover scout must undergo the eligibility test (The B-P Award's Test Camp).

5. The B-P Award's certificate will be issued by the Scouts Association of Malaysia's headquarters (HQ).

The candidates who are awarded the Baden-Powell Award are eligible to apply to become the member of the Association of Top Achiever Scouts (ATAS) (Malay: Persatuan Pengakap Berprestasi Tinggi) and get their badge.

== New Zealand ==
The Baden Powell Award is a peer recognition Award, not a badge that can be earned on the completion of a set of criteria. The Rover Crew, in consultation with the Regional Rover Leader, awards the Baden Powell Award for a member which:

- Is a continuously active and useful Crew member, having organised and co-ordinated projects and activities which ideally emphasise the aims of the Rover Section, of service to Scouting, the community and personal development.
- Sets a personal example of the Scout way of life, and living by the Scout Law and Promise.
- Has given outstanding and extensive service as a member of a Rover Crew.
- Has held a position of responsibility outside the Rover Crew on Scouting or another community organisation for a period of at least two years.
- Has been a member of a Rover Crew for a minimum period of three years.

== South Africa ==
=== Scouts South Africa ===
The BP Award is the highest Scouting award available to Rovers in South Africa. It is designed to challenge and test all who set out to achieve this prestigious Award and takes into consideration the aim of Scouting, to encourage the Physical, Intellectual, Emotional, Social and Spiritual Character Development of youth.

Similar to other awards, the BP Award allows for the highest standard to be set. This occurs through the individual participant planning and proposing their goals to their Rover Crew. Through consultation and discussion at this level a target is set that is of a level that is guaranteed to be challenging and that meets the requirements of the BP Award.

In achieving this award, a Rover will set an example of the Scout way of life, carrying out the Rover Motto of 'Service'. The badge is worn on the left sleeve.

To achieve the BP Award a Rover needs to complete the following:

1. Attain the four Advancement Bars.
2. Attain four Rover Awards.
3. Attain at least one of the Rover Challenge Awards.
4. Attend a panel interview with the Regional Commissioner or their nominee to confirm that the Promise and Law have been adopted as a way of life and discuss the personal development that has occurred by means of the Rover Programme.

== United Kingdom ==
=== The Scout Association ===
The Scout Association no longer operate a Rover Scout section, having abolished the section in 1964, and they no longer offer the Baden-Powell Award.

=== Baden-Powell Scouts Association ===
The Baden-Powell Award is available to invested Rovers of the Baden-Powell Scouts' Association. The BPSA requirements for the award are similar to the "Traditional" option used by Rovers Australia. The Rover must hold the Scoutcraft Star, Service Training Star, Rover Rambler's Badge and Rover Project Badge. They are also required to show that they have been setting a personal example of the "Scout Way of Life" and to complete an interview with the Chief Commissioner of the Baden-Powell Scouts’ Association.

=== Girlguiding ===
The Baden-Powell Challenge Award was the highest a Guide could attain, until the award was retired in 2019.

== United States ==
=== Outdoor Service Guides ===
The Baden Powell Award is the highest award a Rover Knight can achieve in the Outdoor Service Guides. It has similar requirements as the Baden-Powell Scouts Association and Rovers Australia; Rover Scouts must earn their Rambler's Badge, Scoutcraft Star, Project Badge and Service Training Star. They must also receive a recommendation from their Rover Crew, Rover Crew Leader, and Group Scoutmaster, and complete an interview with the association's Chief Commissioner.

== See also ==
- Scouts Australia
- Scouts South Africa
- Baden-Powell Scouts' Association
- Rover Scouts
- Scouts New Zealand
- Girlguiding UK
