= W. F. Waters =

Australian Rover Scout Leader (1897–1968)

Bill Waters
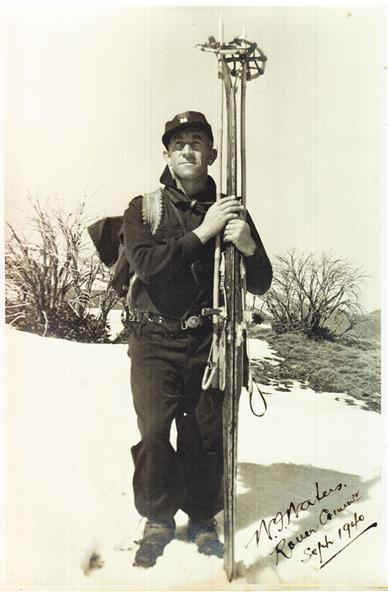
- W.F. Waters in 1940
- Born: 22 August 1897; Traralgon, Victoria, Australia
- Died: 8 October 1968 (aged 71); Fitzroy, Victoria
- Resting place: Investiture Point, on the Bogong High Plains; 36°54′0″S 147°17′28″E
- Occupation: Public servant
- Employer: Australian Public Service
- Organization: Scouts Victoria
- Title: Headquarters Commissioner for Rovers
- Parent(s): Francis William Waters, Eva Waters (née Hillard)
- Awards: Silver Acorn and Bar; Silver Wolf

William Francis "Bill" Waters (22 August 1897 – 8 October 1968) was Scouts Victoria's Headquarters Commissioner for Rover Scouts between 1930 and 1965.

Through both the Rover Scouts and Melbourne Walking Club, of which he was Chief Leader between 1934 and his ascension to the club's presidency in 1967, Waters introduced thousands of young people to the then-new sports of bushwalking and cross-country skiing. Waters contributed articles detailing many of his treks to the magazine of the Melbourne Walking Club, the Melbourne Walker, both on the treks themselves through the previously unexplored wilderness of Victoria, and on the history of the areas he visited.

Waters led the Australian Contingent to the 5th World Rover Moot and organised the 1961 7th World Rover Moot in Melbourne. He was a member of the party which was a part of the first winter ascent of Mount Bogong, the highest mountain in Victoria in 1928. He began to take groups of Rover Scouts on week-long treks to explore the Bogong High Plains in 1932. The success of these treks led to the construction of the Bogong Rover Chalet before winter 1940.

Waters was presented with the Silver Acorn by Lord Baden-Powell himself in 1934, and received a Bar to the Silver Acorn 20 years later. Waters was presented with the highest award of The UK Scout Association, the Silver Wolf, at Surfmoot 1961, following the Seventh World Rover Moot.

In recognition of his unequalled contribution to Rover Scouting, Scouts Australia's Adult Recognition Award for service to the Rover Section is known in Victoria as the WF Waters Rover Service Award.

== Personal life ==
Waters was an only child, born on 22 August 1897 in Traralgon, Victoria to Eva and Francis Waters. The family later relocated to Melbourne, where Waters attended Melbourne High School.

Waters joined the Australian Public Service (APS) in 1914 as a naval clerk in the Department of Defence. He transferred to the Department of Trade and Customs in 1926, where he worked in several roles, including supervisor, investigation officer and senior investigation officer; before retiring from the APS in 1962.

He represented Victoria in lacrosse and was an amateur heavyweight boxer. Waters was one of the Freemasons that founded Melbourne's Baden-Powell Lodge, the first lodge to be named after Lord Baden-Powell.

In 1933, Waters was appointed as an honorary ranger and an honorary forester by the Forestry Commission of Victoria. These appointments gave Waters the authority to act on behalf of the Forestry Commission. Also in 1933, Waters was gazetted as a member of the Committee of Management of the Kinglake National Park, another organisation that he would have a long association with.

At the time of his death in 1968, Waters was Chairman of the Kinglake National Park Committee of Management, and a member of Scouts Victoria, the Melbourne Walking Club, the Royal Historical Society of Victoria, and the Skiing Club of Victoria.

== Melbourne Walking Club ==
He was a prominent bush walker in Victoria and held several offices in the Melbourne Walking Club, beginning in 1925 as a general committee member, before spending five years as secretary during the period 1927 to 1933 – when he assumed the position of chief leader. Waters would remain chief leader, responsible for overseeing the party leaders of all the club's walks, until he became the club's president in 1967.

Waters had particular knowledge of Mount Bogong, and was asked to join the rescue party that Howard Michell raised to try and save the other two members of his party, Mick Hull and Cleve Cole in August 1936 as they attempted the first crossing of the Bogong High Plains during winter. Hull was saved, but Cleve Cole died of hypothermia.

During the period of 1927–1930, a series of articles by him appeared in the magazine Victorian Scout.

== Rover Scout Commissioner ==
Waters was appointed as Headquarters Commissioner for Rovers in 1930 and continued in the role until 1965, when he was reassigned to the newly created role of Commissioner for Rover Training. On appointing Waters, Chief Commissioner Charles Hoadley gave a simple brief: Get the Rovers out of their Dens and back into the outdoors. This goal Waters would dedicate the remainder of his life to achieving.

With Waters' guidance, Victorian Rovers built three Chalets, ran the 7th World Moot – the first World Scout event ever held in the southern hemisphere, mapped much of the land between Frankston and Warburton, pioneered skiing, began training their own leaders, maintained their organisation through the Second World War, and became the leaders of Rovering in Australia.

=== Alpine Rovering ===
With Waters' encouragement, Victorian Rovers were amongst the pioneers of skiing in the state. These achievements grew from Waters teaching the Rovers the basics of cross-country skiing on a grassy hill. Water had much experience in the new sport, having been a part of the first party to reach the summit of Victoria's highest peak, Mt Bogong during winter, back in 1928.

==== Mount Donna Buang ====
The Rovers skied at Mount Donna Buang for many years until access to the better snowfields further from Melbourne improved. In 1945, following the end of the Second World War, the Rover Section wanted to construct a memorial to the Rovers who had been killed during the hostilities. By November 1945, £110 had already been raised. Waters purchased the land on the slopes of Mt Donna Buang and began the planning for the construction. By May 1946, funds had doubled, and the framework had been assembled by Rovers. However the postwar building restrictions prevented the completion of Rover Memorial Chalet, Warburton until 1949. This facility is still in use today, now known as the Warburton Trails Adventure Centre.

==== Bogong High Plains ====
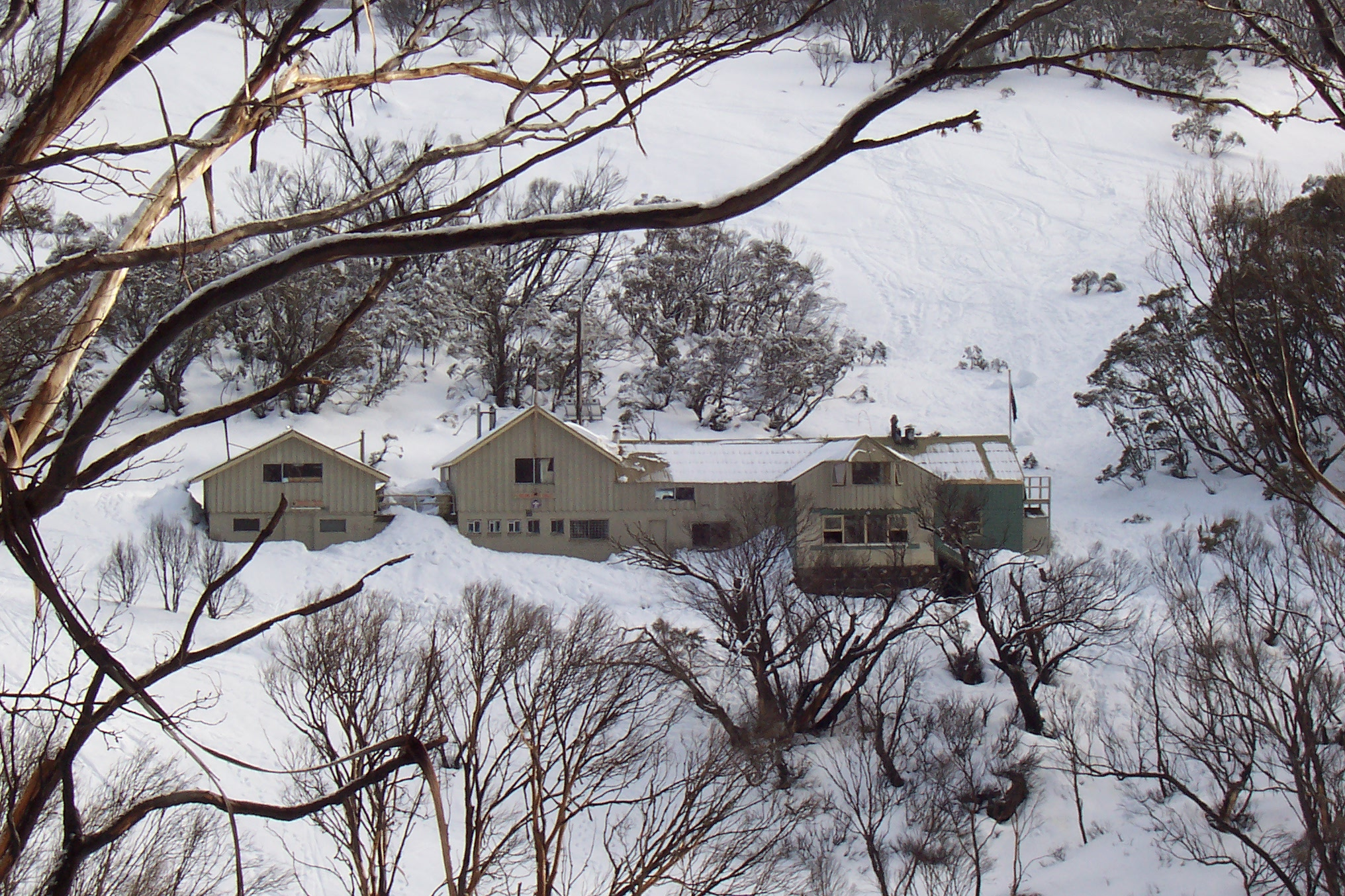
The Bogong Rover Chalet in 2005

The first "Winter Party", as they would come to be known, was held in 1932 and based at Cope Hut. Nine people attended the two-week-long adventure on the Bogong High Plains. Over the coming years, the numbers attending the Winter Parties would increase, with participants from interstate also joining the Victorians in the early exploration of the area.

By 1938, the size and number of the Rover Winter Parties were beginning to monopolise Cope Hut, as well as the nearby Wallace's Hut. Waters wrote to all Victorian Rover Crews and appealed for funds to construct a "Rover Hut" between the two huts. After raising £700, the Bogong Rover Chalet was constructed over five weeks in early 1940, in time for the ski season.

The Rover Chalet is sometimes referred to as "the odd chalet out", because it is the only Ski Chalet outside the major Victorian Ski Resorts. This is for the simple reason that it predates the resorts, and the safest way to access the Bogong High Plain during winter was from Gippsland instead of Mt Beauty, as it has been since the construction of the Kiewa Hydroelectric Scheme in the 1950s.

==== Baw Baw Plateau ====
Waters also encouraged the efforts of the Yallourn and Moe Rover Crews, who were some of the first to ski the Baw-Baw Plateau, originally at Mt Erica. Beginning in 1934, the Rovers cut a number of ski runs and developed the area as a community service. In 1938, the Yallourn Rover Crew rescued two boys who had been lost in the snow overnight. Their parents arranged for financing for the Rover Crew to build a hut near Mushroom Rocks and it was officially opened by Bill Waters in 1940 on the King's Birthday public holiday.

More and more Rovers began skiing in the area, until in 1946 the Rovers began to ski at Mount Baw Baw itself, and the future site of the Alpine Resort. Waters negotiated with the owners of Neulyne's Mill for the use of some of their huts during the winter to accommodate the Rovers, although they still had to hike up to the snowfields from what is now the entry to the resort. From 1952, the Rovers were allowed the use of a cottage and the remaining huts. Public use of Mount Baw Baw increased over the next decade, leading to the establishment of the Mount Baw Baw Alpine Village.

As soon as the Alpine Village was announced, Waters was back at work, negotiating for the Rover Scouts to build their own purpose-built ski lodge. The site was granted in 1964, and the W.F. Waters Rover Ski Lodge was officially opened by the Chief Commissioner of Victoria in 1967.

==== Resting place ====
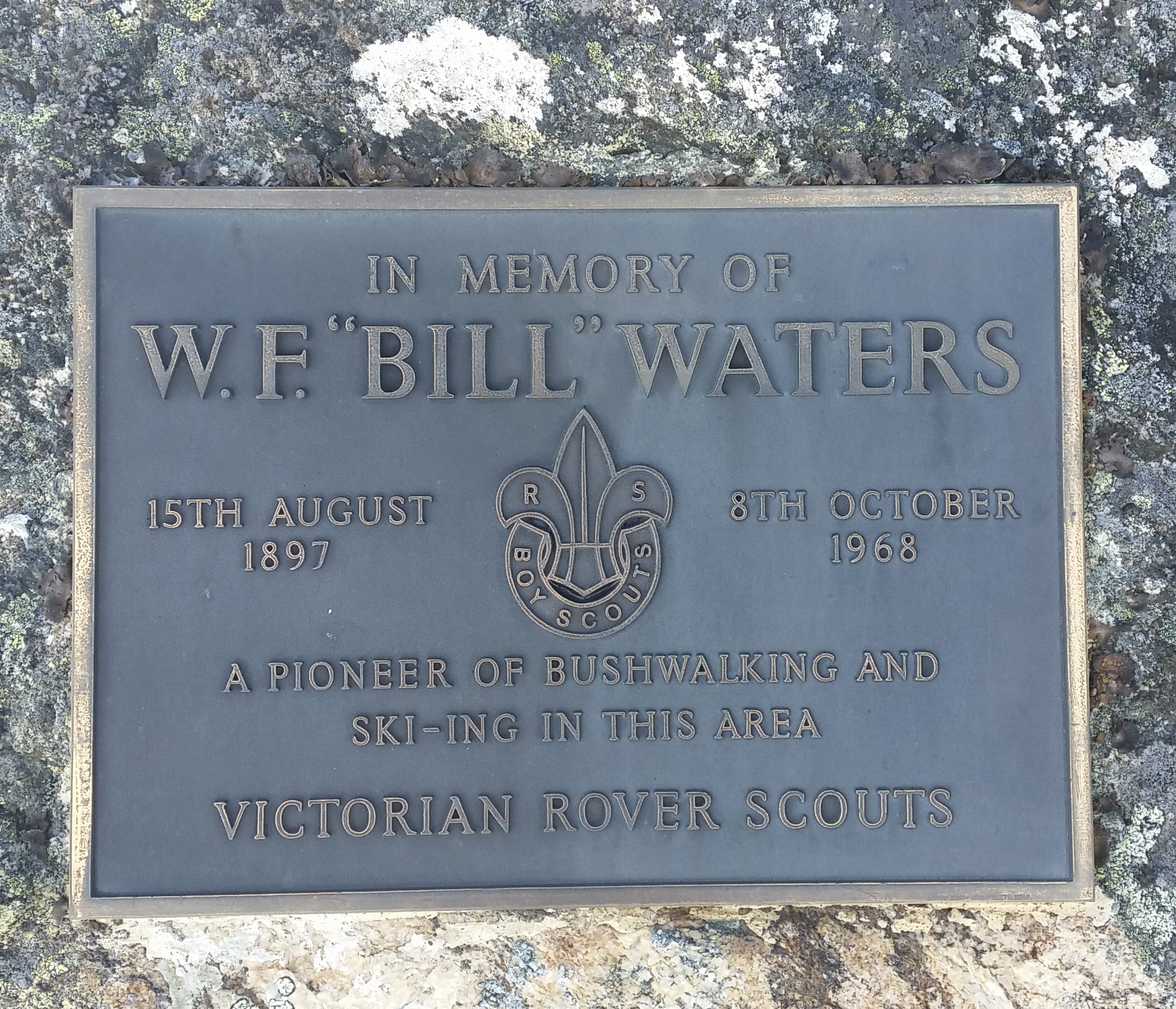
Memorial plaque dedicated to Waters on the Bogong High Plain

Because of Waters' passion and commitment to skiing and bushwalking in Victoria's Alpine areas, his remains were scattered at a place he named Investiture Point, the closest place to the Bogong Rover Chalet at which it is possible to see Mount Bogong. Over 250 people attended the memorial service on 26 April 1969. They were accommodated at the Rover Chalet, Wilkinson's Hut, Wallace's Hut, Cope Hut and in hundreds of tents along the Aqueduct between the three buildings. The service was led by Rover Scout Leader Ivan Stevens, and included the unveiling of a simple memorial to the "pioneer of bushwalking and ski-ing in this area", as well as an inspiring eulogy from Jim Blake of the Melbourne Walking Club.

=== A Fellowship of the Open Air ===
When Chief Commissioner Charles Hoadley appointed Waters as Headquarters Commissioner for Rovers, he charged Waters to focus on building up the outdoor side of Rover Scouting, using his experiences with the Melbourne Walking Club and Ski Club of Victoria to develop the young men as leaders in the Victorian bush. In 1930, the Victorian Rover Scouts' outdoor activities were largely limited to the competition for the Matthew Evans Shield, which was awarded for "best hiking". That would soon change.

Waters set about developing outdoor adventures by organising them himself. In the November 1930 edition of Victorian Scout, the journal of Scouts Victoria, Waters published a list of activities open to Rovers from across the state which were to be led by experienced activity leaders. This list of activities would become known as the Fixture Card, and it included activities like bushwalking, skiing, surfing and rock climbing; as well as working bees at Gilwell Park in Gembrook. Eventually the fixture card would include social activities and lectures to meet the demands of the Rovers.

As the fixture card activities headed further afield, they became more popular, and would often attract Rovers and Rover Leaders from South Australia and New South Wales. Eventually, these trips became such a part of Rovering life that the minimum expectation was that each member would attend a minimum of six activities a year – including at least two hikes, one skiing trip and one working bee. Meanwhile, Rovers were also expected to attend their own local District and Crew events as well!

==== Frankston Jamboree ====
The 1934/35 Jamboree was the first Australian Scout Jamboree, and the only one to be attended by the Chief Scout of the World, Lord Baden-Powell. As this was during the Great Depression, Rovers were employed to prepare the site, and the Rovers also played an important part in the running of the Jamboree itself, but by far their biggest contribution was the post-Jamboree hikes through to Gilwell Park in Gembrook.

750 Scouts took part in the hikes, led by 108 Rovers, while other Rovers manned the expedition headquarters and field hospital at Powelltown, as well as their own fire observers on Mt Donna Buang and Spion Kop. Other Rovers were engaged full-time with providing communications between the parties and expedition headquarters, which was a serious challenge at the time. The major obstacle however, was that while some of the area had been mapped by the military or the Forestry Commission, around 30% of the area that the hiking parties were to travel through was uncharted.

Every weekend for over four months, Rovers traveled out to the area with prismatic compasses and theodolites to survey this area. Their information, as well as the information from the existing government maps were combined at Rover HQ. The master Rover map was the basis of maps of the upper Yarra valley for decades to come.

During the hikes, Lord Baden-Powell resided at The Lodge in Gilwell Park and when the hike parties made it to the campground, he presided over a campfire. At the campfire, Baden-Powell praised the work of the Victorian Rovers in their contributions to the Jamboree, noting the hikes particularly, and saying that they were one of the best features of any Jamboree he had attended.

Baden-Powell would later write that the Frankston Jamboree hikes were the biggest series hikes he'd seen organised outside the British Army, while Waters also wrote that believed Baden-Powell had presented him with the Silver Acorn largely in recognition of the Jamboree hike program.

==== Hut Service Section ====
The Rovering community's interest in the outdoors grew, and beginning in 1936, they began to take an interest in maintaining the 20 abandoned huts at old sawmill sites in what is now the Yarra Ranges National Park, the forested mountains between Warburton and Powelltown. These 20 huts were within easy walking distance of each other and therefore were popular with Scouts and other bushwalkers as well.

The scheme was well appreciated by the Forests Commission of Victoria and the mill owners, while the huts' visitors' books were full of praise as well. The crews which took on responsibilities for these huts were expected to maintain their hut, visit it regularly, and report on its condition to the Chief Warden at Rover Scout Headquarters. They also provided visitors' books, firewood and some basic utensils for people staying at the hut. Unfortunately, most of these huts were soon to be destroyed during the Black Friday bushfires in 1939.

The Rovers of the Ballarat area also maintained a hut in the Pyrenees during this time.

== International Scouting ==
Waters' first experience with international Scouting came shortly before his appointment as Rover Commissioner, in 1929 at the 3rd World Scout Jamboree held at Arrow Park to commemorate the 21st anniversary of the publication of Scouting for Boys.

In 1953, Waters embarked on his second overseas trip, leading Australia's first ever Contingent to a World Moot, the Fifth World Rover Moot at Kandersteg International Scout Centre, in Switzerland. Waters took 86 people to Kandersteg, including sixty Victorian Rovers.

After the Moot, the Australians visited Gilwell Park and spent three weeks touring the British Isles. During this trip, Waters represented Australia at the 14th World Scout Conference in Lichtenstein.

=== 7th World Rover Moot ===
Hosted by Victorian Rovers at Wonga Park between 27 December 1961 and 6 January 1962, the 7th World Rover Moot was the first World Scout Event to be held in the southern hemisphere. The event was attended by 970 Rover Scouts from all Australian States and 15 other countries.

Waters was the Moot Chief, the man responsible for overseeing the operation of the entire event. With a team of Leaders from across Victoria and Australia, Waters worked for two years to create an event that would set a new standard for Rover Moots in Australia and around the world.

Seventh World Rover Moot Council
Moot Role	Name	Normal Scouting Role
Moot Chief	W.F. Waters	Headquarters Commissioner for Rovers; Scouts Victoria
Moot Administrative Commissioner	Colonel E.R.E Black OBE	General Secretary; Scouts Victoria
No. 1 Subcamp Chief	W.L. Williams	
No. 2 Subcamp Chief	F.R. Watson	
No. 3 Subcamp Chief	E.M. Derrick	
No. 4 Subcamp Chief	A. Keeble	
Administration Services
1st Deputy Moot Chief	Roy Driver	Assistant Headquarters Commissioner for Rovers; Scouts Victoria
Asst. Moot Chief – Secretary	M. Brown	
Asst. Moot Chief – Quartermaster	Lt Colonel D.J. Edgar	
Asst. Moot Chief – Victualing	T. Wallace	
Asst. Moot Chief	R.W. McKellar	
Publicity, Activities & Maintenance Services
2nd Deputy Moot Chief	Wally Watts	Assistant County Commissioner for Rovers; Hoadley County, Scouts Victoria
Asst. Moot Chief – Activities	A. Blair	
Asst. Moot Chief – Transport	G. Clarke	
Asst. Moot Chief – Sites & Services	A Jackson	
Moot Marshal	M. Hough	
Welfare Services
3rd Deputy Moot Chief	Stan Bales	Headquarters Commissioner for Rovers; Scouts Australia NSW
Asst. Moot Chief – Billeting	A.G.T. Grant	
Asst. Moot Chief – Camp Accommodation	M. Johnston	
Asst. Moot Chief – Fraternity	E. Sargeant	
Expeditions
Assistant Moot Chief – Expeditions	Ivan Stevens	Assistant Headquarters Commissioner for Rovers; Scouts Victoria
Personnel	Ivan Fox	
Transport	E. Sandbach	
Routes	George Tanck	
Leaders	Ivan Fox	
Communications	J. Turner	

For the first time, the Moot program included a total of 48 different four-day expeditions to locations across Victoria, including Anglesea, the Bogong High Plains, the Buchan Caves, Lake Eildon, and Mount Buffalo. One whole day was set aside for participants to provide service to the community. Some of the service that was completed by the Moot included clearing the Puffing Billy Railway line from Belgrave to Menzies Creek, clearing the grounds of the Adult Deaf and Dumb Home in Blackburn, building kennels and runs at the Lady Nell Seeing Eye Dog School and painting the Guide Hut at Clifford Park.

The 1962 Bushfires swept through the Moot site on January 16 (only nine days after the Moot ended) and many of the Rover Huts, other outbuildings and even the landowners' garden were destroyed in the blaze.

Following the Seventh World Rover Moot, there was a worldwide downturn in the number of Rover Scouts, leading to an end to the Rover Scout section in the United Kingdom and many other countries. 30 years later, Victorian Rovers hosted the 8th World Moot at Gilwell Park, Gembrook over the summer of 1990–91.

== Honours and legacy ==
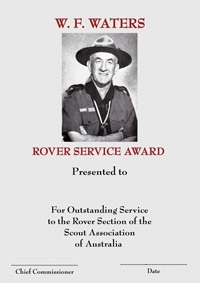
WF Waters Rover Service Award Certificate

Waters served as Victorian Headquarters Commissioner for Rovers for 35 years (1930–1965). Under his guidance, Victorian Rovers built three Chalets, ran the Seventh World Moot and became the leaders of Rovering in Australia.

Waters was invested with the Silver Wolf, the highest award of the UK Scout Association (of which Scouts Victoria was a part of at the time) at Surfmoot 1961. The simple ceremony took place at the main flagpole in the presence of his friends, and around 350 Rovers who had been a part of the Moot. The award was presented by then Chief Scout of the Commonwealth, Charles Maclean

Waters remains a giant of Victorian Rovering to this day. Following campaigning from the Rovers of Victoria, Scouts Australia's National Council created a new Adult Recognition Award for outstanding service to the Rover Section by a Rover, Rover Advisor, or other person in 1982. These awards would be awarded on a state basis, and the Branch Rover Councils were authorised to name the award after a person who had contributed to the development of Rovering in their state. This award is known as the Henry Rymill Award in South Australia and Stan Bales Award in New South Wales. However, the numbers of WF Waters Rover Service Awardees dwarf the rest of the National Rover Service Awards, a testament to the high level of Scouting that Victorian Rovering developed under Bill's guidance over many decades.

Waters' name is also carried on by the WF Waters Lodge, a private ski lodge owned and operated by Rover Scouts Victoria at Mt Baw Baw Alpine Resort, and the Bill Waters Rover Crew in Nunawading.

== See also ==
Non-profit organisation positions
Preceded by Mr Albert E. Curry	Scouts Victoria; Headquarters Commissioner for Rovers; 1930 –1965	Succeeded by Mr Jack Maver OAM
New title	Scouts Victoria; Commissioner for Rover Training; 1965–1968	Dormant Death of incumbent
