= Scouting 2007 Centenary =

- The badge for the 2007 Centenary, worn by Scouts around the world
- Country: All countries of the world
- Website; Scouting 2007

The Scouting 2007 Centenary comprised celebrations around the world in which Scouts celebrated 100 years of the world Scout movement. The original celebrations were focused on the United Kingdom, such as the camp on Brownsea Island, the birthplace of Scouting, and the 21st World Scout Jamboree in Chelmsford, Essex.

National Scout movements added extra celebrations in amongst the international ones, including the Australian Scout Jamboree held 1–13 January 2007 at Elmore, Victoria, Australia, and KanderJam at the Kandersteg International Scout Centre in Switzerland.

== Global activities ==
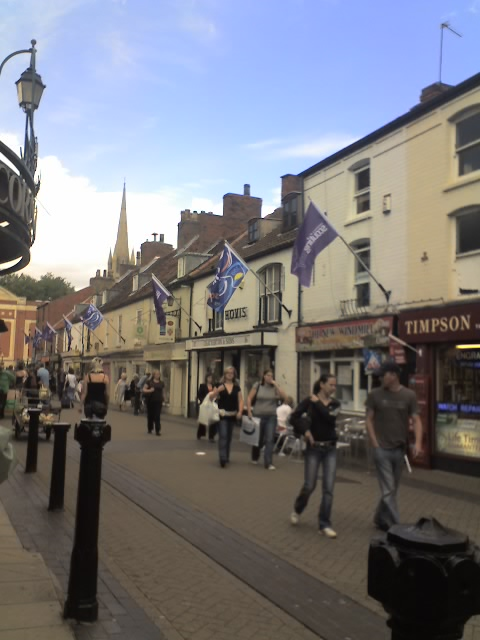
Flags in Sincil Street, Lincoln, UK

The Centenary celebrations began on 1 January 2007, and members of the World Organization of the Scout Movement (WOSM) were encouraged to start their programme on that day, and continue right through the year. In London, there was a New Year's Day Parade of Scouts. In towns, flags were flown to celebrate Scouting. Europa postage stamps were issued monthly throughout 2007 for the celebration.

=== Scout and Guide Spirit Flame ===
On 22 February 2007, the 150th anniversary of Robert Baden-Powell's birth, a torch was lit at his grave in Nyeri, Kenya. Several thousand Scouts and Guides from around the world attended the ceremony that included a procession from Baden-Powell's old home nearby.

The flame was carried by Scouts and Guides through Ethiopia, Sudan, Egypt, Greece, Italy, France, Belgium and finally the UK to arrive on Brownsea Island, UK on the eve of Scouting's Sunrise. The spirit flame was brought to Brownsea Island via Sea Scouts that rowed a small boat across Poole Harbour. After the Sunrise celebrations on 1 August 2007. the flame continued onwards to the 21st World Scout Jamboree.

=== Sunrise ceremony ===
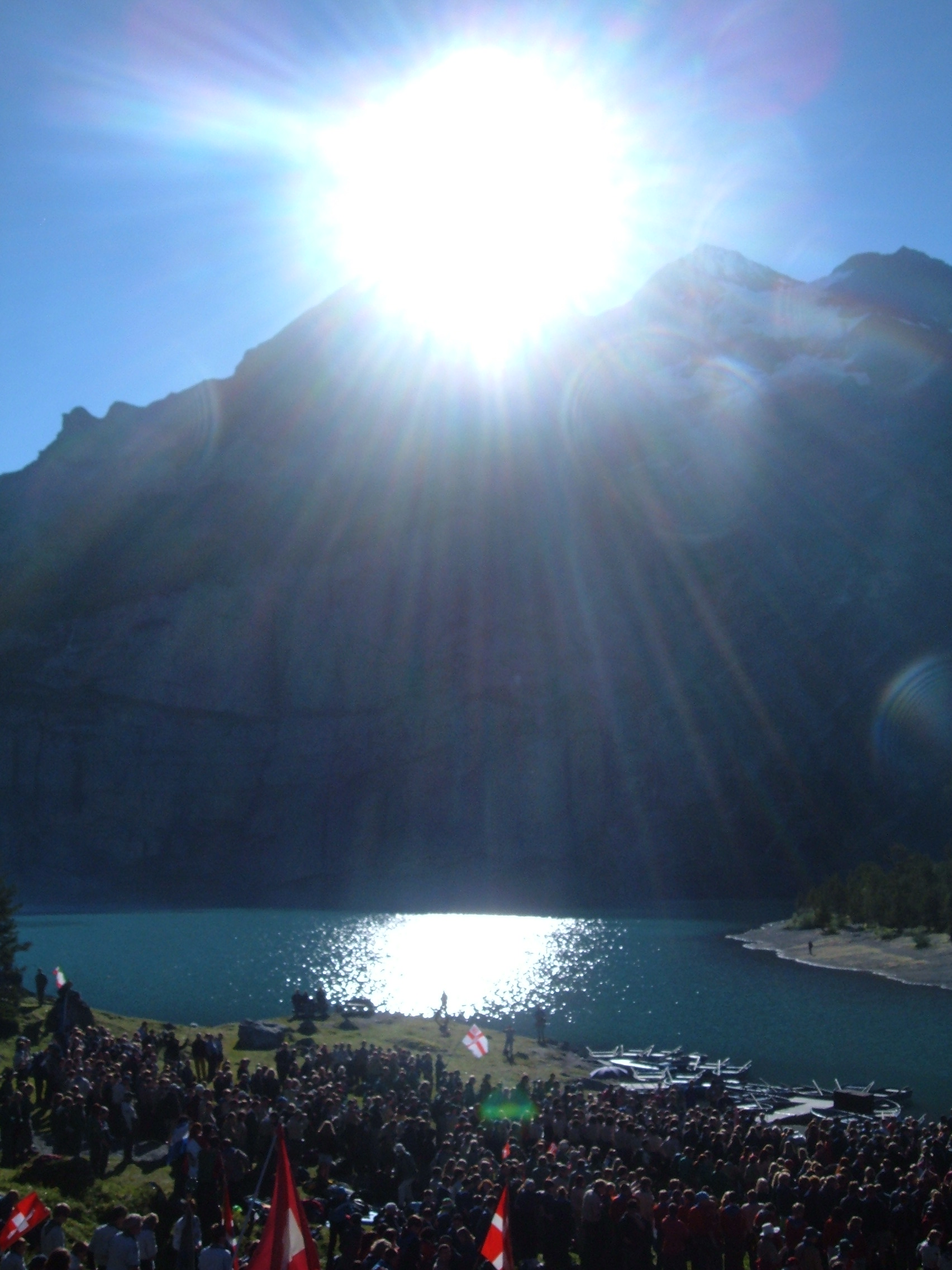
Scouting's Sunrise Ceremony, Oeschinensee, Switzerland

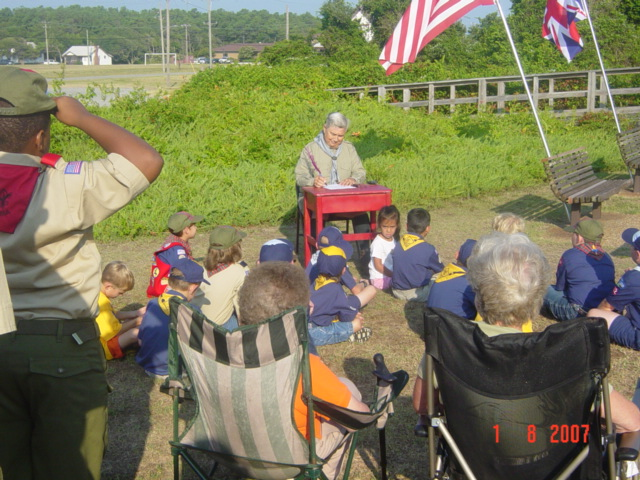
Actor reading Baden-Powell's final words to Scouts at a Sunrise Ceremony

The first Scout Camp opened on 1 August 1907 by the Movement's founder General Baden-Powell. At 8am, he blew a kudu horn to gather round the 20 boys that were on the island for that camp. Exactly one hundred years later, around 400,000 Scouts in the UK took part in an event to commemorate this. On Brownsea Island, a Scout read out Baden-Powell's words of 100 years ago, calling for peace, comradeship and co-operation. Members of Scout associations worldwide renewed their promise at 8am local time; and Scout troops organised a "good turn" in aid of their local communities. Additionally, at 8am Western European Summer Time, Scouts internationally used the Internet to celebrate and communicate with Scouts on Brownsea Island as part of the World Scout Jamboree. Scout groups turned the event into a day-long celebration.

A flame that traveled from Africa was used to light a campfire that burned through the night, marking the passing of the first 100 years of the Scout movement.

The Chief Scout of the United Kingdom, Peter Duncan, blew the same kudu horn, and one Scout from each Scouting country passed over a "Bridge of Friendship", and shook the left hand of every other Scout as they passed.

=== World Jamboree 2007 ===
The 21st World Scout Jamboree was the main event of the year, with more than 40,000 young people from around the world taking part in a 12‑day event in Chelmsford in the south of England. The event started on 27 July 2007, where the camping participants celebrated the Scouting Sunrise in one place. While this is not the largest encampment of Scouts ever held (over 50,000 young Scouts camped in Birkenhead at the Coming of Age Jamboree in 1929), it is expected that the large numbers of day visitors and the concurrent camps around the world made this jamboree the largest Scouting event since the movement started 100 years earlier.

=== Brownsea Island camps ===
There were several camps on the famous birthplace of Scouting, including a Sunrise Camp, a Replica Camp, and a New Centenary Camp. The replica camp was held twice, each 4.5 days camping running around the August celebrations. The activities included historical 1907 activities, several with a modern twist. The first of the replica camps was for purely Boy Scouts and the second included a patrol of girls. As well as Scouts there were boys from the Boys Brigade, as in the original 1907 camp.

== Activities by national Scout organisations ==
=== Scouts Australia ===
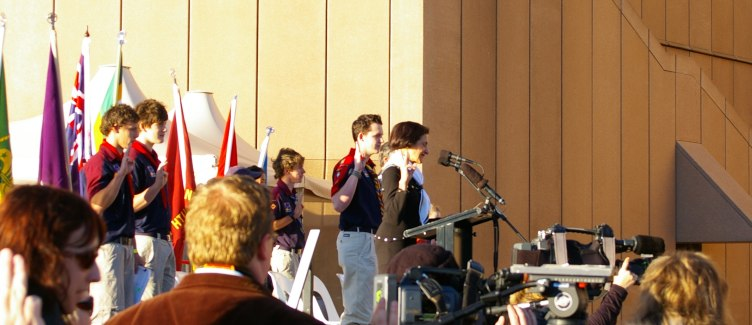
Chief Scout and Governor for NSW, Marie Bashir, leads assembled Scouts renewing their promise at the Sunrise ceremony, Sydney Opera House

Scouts and Scouting supporters in Australia gathered at public venues to celebrate the Dawn of the New Scouting Centenary. In Canberra, Australia's capital, local Scouts joined the Chief Scout of Australia to renew their Scout Promise in a commitment of world peace and social betterment. Other events occurred in Sydney at the Opera House and in Melbourne.

During 2005 and 2006, Australian Rovers developed the Centenary of Scouting Peace Boomerang which completed a journey of over 18,000 km around Australia spreading a message of peace and unity leading up to the Centenary. Australian Rovers developed the boomerang as a Gift for Peace project that would involve Rovers, Scouts and the general public, and raise awareness and generate discussions amongst young people about peace. The boomerang, an Australian Aboriginal wooden ceremonial tool, returns to the person who throws it, making it a fitting symbol as it traveled for 18 months around Australia.

=== Guidisme et Scoutisme en Belgique (Belgium)-JAMbe ===
On 28 and 29 April 2007, 95,000 members from the five Belgian Scout and Guide associations gathered in Brussels to celebrate. The final show was attended by the Belgian crown prince, Prince Filip, who was a Scouting member in his younger days. They had to play the show twice because King Baudouin Stadium has a capacity of only 50,000 people. This was the biggest gathering (in numbers at one day) of any of the festivities anywhere held by Scouting.

=== Scouts Canada-11th Canadian Scout Jamboree ===
The 11th Canadian Scout Jamboree (CJ'07) was held from 25 July 2007 to 1 August 2007 at Tamaracouta Scout Reserve just north of Montreal. On 1 August there was a sunrise ceremony commemorating the first 100 years of Scouting.

=== Asociación Scouts de Colombia-National Centenary Gathering ===
About 5.000 Colombian Cub Scouts, Boy Scouts and Rovers gathered in the Simón Bolívar National Park, in the heart of Bogotá, Capital City of Colombia, in the National Rally "Mapialsancla: A trip to the Fantastic dreams world", the National Jamboree "Sliders Live100Scout", and the National Rover Moot "Challenge Colombia". The participation of many young people who took Bogotá for 7 days with fun and varied activities for celebrating the centenary of World Scouting.

=== Scouts et Guides de France-Sunrise Ceremony on Mont Blanc ===
A team of Scouts and Guides from the Savoie districts celebrated Scouting Sunrise from the peak of Mont Blanc. Eduardo Missoni, Secretary General of WOSM, visited the team's first preparatory weekend and presented them with a flag to take to the summit. Guillaume Légaut, president of Scouts et Guides de France participated in the expedition.

=== Federação Escutista de Portugal-Acanac ===
In Portugal, a one-week Acanac ('acampamento nacional, meaning 'national camp') was held where Scout groups from Portugal (specially from the Portuguese Catholic Scout Association) got together to celebrate the 100 years of Scouting worldwide. They also celebrated the sunrise ceremony.

=== Swiss Guide and Scout Movement-Igloo village and KanderJam ===
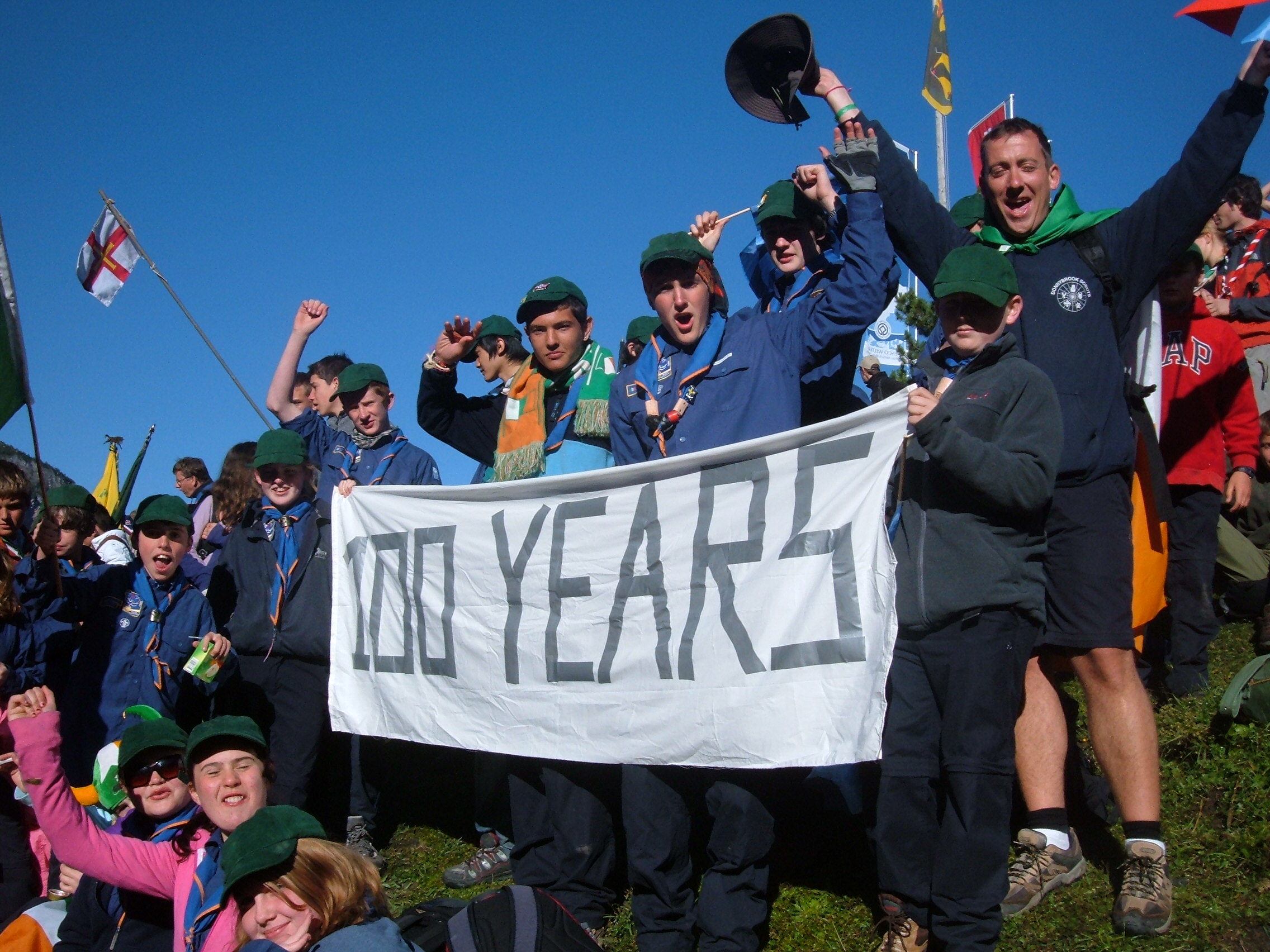
7th Donnybrook Scout Troop (Ireland) celebrating Scouting's Sunrise at Oeschinensee, high in the Swiss Alps above Kandersteg village, 1 August 2007

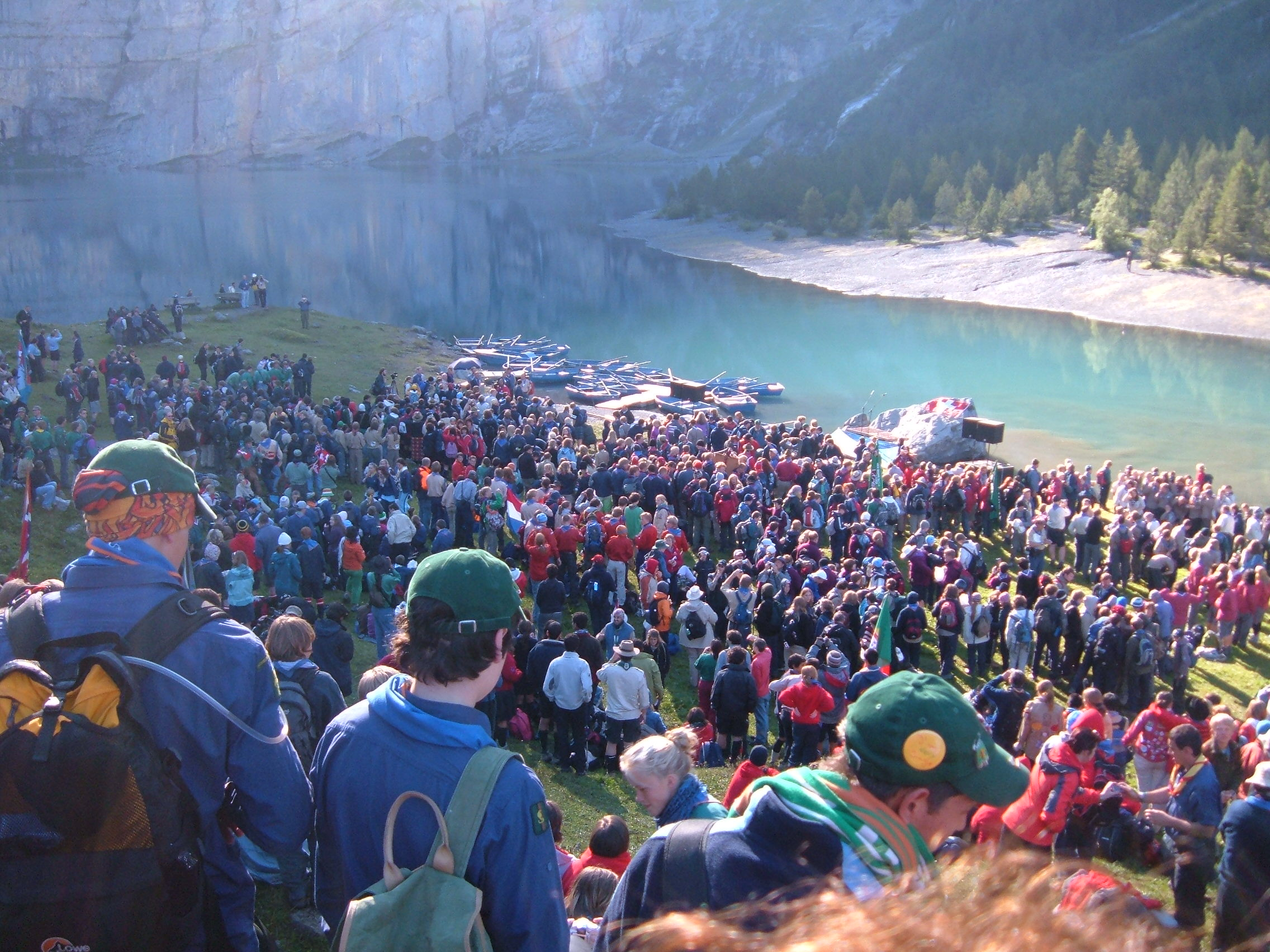
The sun rising above Oeschinensee bathing 2,500 Scouts in sunshine at 09:00 (CET)

On 17 and 18 March 2007, Swiss Scouts planned to build an igloo village with each construction representing one of the member countries and territories of WOSM. The event was held on the glacier of the Plaine Morte near the resort of Crans-Montana, in Switzerland. A total of 130 igloos were built, short of the planned number, but this still beat the previous world record of 100 igloos. Additionally, every team composed a message of peace for the Scout organisation represented by their igloo. These letters will be sent including a photo of the igloo village taken at night-fall, when the igloos were illuminated by torches laid out in the snow spelling out the word peace. The public was encouraged to attend the event, in order to show how igloos are made and to involve them in the construction.

A large gathering of Scouts from forty countries took place at Kandersteg International Scout Centre, the Scout centre run by the World Organization of Scouting Movement. Having taken place at the same time as the world jamboree, 1,800 guests stayed at the centre where on 1 August 2008 Scouts from around the world celebrated the Scouting's Sunrise and Swiss National Day at Oeschinensee, overlooking the town of Kandersteg, high in the Swiss Alps.

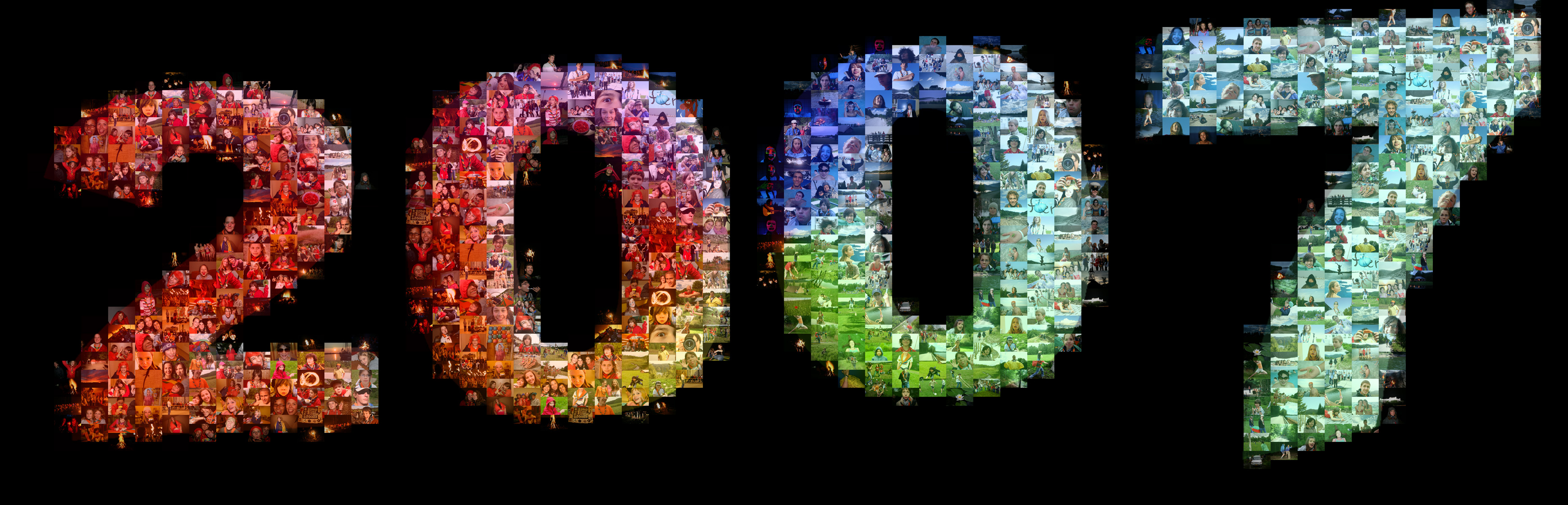
Mosaic made from Scouting pictures by Luxemburg Scouts.

=== The Scout Association of the United Kingdom ===
Despite hosting a large number of international centenary events, including the World Jamboree, a large number of county and district level events were also organised by members of The Scout Association.

Scottish Scouting ran a set of 12 camps open to members of the Explorer Section in the UK. These camps' themes ranged from activity camps to Young Leaders courses.

Hampshire Scout County organised H007, held at New Park near Brockenhurst, with over 8,000 Scouts in attendance. Amongst the range of activities, the camp hosted members of the British Army and Royal Navy.

In May 2007, a team from Hampshire Scouts Expeditions reached the summit of Mount Everest to mark the centenary of Scouting.

=== Baden-Powell Scouts' Association (United Kingdom) ===
The Baden-Powell Scouts' Association celebrated the Centenary of Scouting by issuing commemorative badges and holding their own Centenary Camp in Southampton.

== Other activities ==
Great Britain issued a commemorative fifty pence coin for the Scouting 2007 Centenary.

=== Gifts for Peace ===
During the 36th World Scout Conference, it was decided that each National Scout Organisation would present a Gift for Peace during 2007. This Gift is expected to be the culmination of work by young people in Scouting over the previous year.

=== Maize maze ===
British farmer Nick Lees and his family created a maze in a 10 acre maize field in the shape of Baden-Powell and a Scouting logo. The maze was open to the public until September 2007, when the maize was harvested. Due to mediocre weather, the maize did not fully reach the expected height of 4.5 m. The maze was at Bickleigh, near Tiverton, Devon.

== See also ==
- 21st World Scout Jamboree
- Brownsea Island Scout camp
