= Rover Scout =

Youth training programme

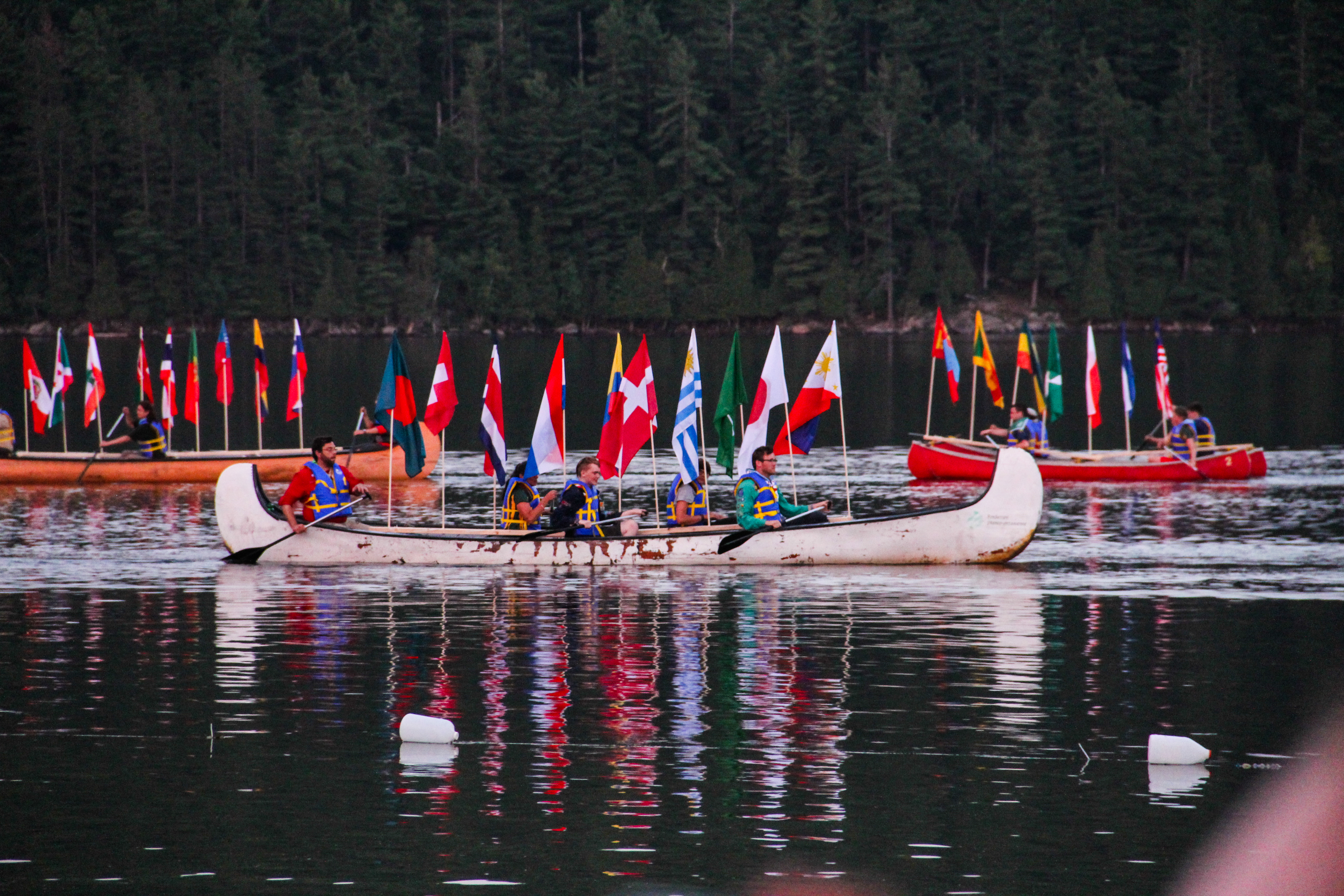
Scout Moot 2013

Rovers or Rovering is a programme associated with some Scout organizations for young adults, originated by The Boy Scouts Association in the United Kingdom. The programme was launched in 1918 for young men who were too old to be Boy Scouts. It was adopted by some other Scout organisations. The educational objective of Rovers is typically focused on teaching young adults how to navigate their newfound maturity. A group of Rovers is called a 'Rover Crew'.

Many Scout organisations, including, since 1966, The Scout Association in the UK, no longer include a Rover programme and some have replaced it with other programmes with modified Baden-Powell Award schemes.

== Nomenclature ==
Robert Baden-Powell's handbook for Rovers was titled Rovering to Success and, throughout his book and elsewhere, he referred to "Rovers" and "Rovering", not 'Rover Scouts'. The word "rover" is a noun referring to someone who roves, a wanderer, a nomad.

== Origins ==
The Rover programme had its origins in two different schemes:

- The first, aimed at Boy Scouts in the United Kingdom who were aged between 15 and 18 years old, was called "Senior Scouts" and was launched in March 1917 during World War I. It quickly became apparent that there were not enough adult male leaders available in wartime and it was several decades before the Senior Scout programme became established.
- The second scheme was the series of "Battlefield Scout Huts" provided for the recreation of British and Empire soldiers in rear areas of the Western Front. Related to these was the St George's Scout Club for servicemen, which operated in the English garrison town of Colchester under the leadership of "Uncle" H. Geoffrey Elwes.

From these projects, it became apparent that there was potential for a programme that catered for young men, many of whom would shortly be returning from the war.

The first mention of the term "Rover" was in The Boy Scouts Association's Headquarters Gazette in August 1918. The booklet Rules for Rover Scouts was issued in September 1918, and the scheme was fully established by November 1919. Baden-Powell set about writing a handbook for the new scheme, which was published in 1922 as Rovering to Success. It contained Baden-Powell's philosophy for a happy adult life as well as ideas for activities that Rovers could organise for themselves. It was translated into many other languages and still remains in print in English today, as well as being available in online versions.

Rovers spread to many other countries following its inception in Britain in 1918, although The Scout Association now operates the Scout Network section for members aged 18-25.

During World War II, some of those in Prisoner of War (POW) camps formed Rover Crews. Artifacts of the Changi (Singapore) POW Rover Crew, including the crew flag are held by the Scout Heritage Centre of Scouts Australia in Victoria, Australia. Additionally there is an ornate investiture certificate from the Changi Rover Crew in the Changi exhibit in the Australian War Memorial in Canberra.

Also during World War II, many Rover leaders enlisted. Fred Dawes operated an independent Rover Crew in the Georges River district of southern Sydney, Australia when The Boy Scouts Association branch would not register the crew due to a lack of leaders.

== Programme ==
A Rover does not wander without direction. In Rovering to Success, Baden-Powell took inspiration from the act of paddling a canoe, using an anecdote from his younger days to illustrate that the objective of the Rover programme is to teach young adults to take their own direction in life, wandering to success and happiness.

"When I was a youngster a popular song was “Paddle your own Canoe,” with the refrain

'Never sit down with a tear or a frown but paddle your own Canoe.'

"This was meant as giving guidance to going through life - and very good too. In my picture of you, you are paddling your canoe, not rowing a boat. The difference is that in the one you are looking ahead and sending yourself along all the time, while in the other you are not looking the way you are going but trusting to the steering of others, and consequently you may bump into snags before you know where you are. Lots of fellows try to row through life in that way. Lots more prefer to sail passively and to be carried along by the wind of luck or the current of chance; it is easier than rowing - and quite as fatal. Give me the fellow who looks ahead and actively paddles his own canoe - i.e. shapes his own course. Paddle your own canoe; don’t rely upon other people to row your boat. You are starting out on an adventurous voyage from the stream of childhood, along the river of adolescence, out across the ocean of manhood to the port you want to reach."

— Robert Baden Powell, Rovering to Success, Paddle your own canoe, page 11

== Age range disputes ==
In his book, Rovering to Success, Baden-Powell wrote that Rovers "are in point of fact a senior branch of the Boy Scout Movement—young men of over seventeen years of age", "In order to be admitted to a Rover Crew you must be 17, but preferably 18, years of age...." and that Rover training "gives the older boy an aim for remaining under helpful influences at the difficult time of his life when he is just entering on manhood". Baden-Powell repeatedly referred to Rovers as "young men". The 1938 edition of the UK Scout Association's Policy, Organisation and Rules states that "Rover Scouting covers the period during which the young man is 'finding himself,' i.e., developing his character and his powers by training them...." While the programme was clearly aimed at young men, an upper age was not specified. Today in most Scout organizations that operate a Rover programme, Rovers starts in the late teens and has an age limit in the mid-20s (see Age groups in Scouting and Guiding). For major international events like the World Scout Moot, participants typically must be 18–25 years old at the time of the event.

In some Scout organizations, particularly Traditional Scouting associations, Rovers do not have an upper age limit. Rover may remain Rovers at any age and in some cases adults of any age may become Rovers. In the Baden-Powell Service Association (United States), all adult members are classed as Rovers.

== Rovers today ==
Rovers programs remain in on some European Scout organizations, most member Commonwealth Scout organizations (e.g., Canada, Australia, New Zealand, South Africa, India, Malaysia, Singapore and Hong Kong), across Central and South America, the Middle East and in many other countries such as Ireland, Japan, Republic of China/Taiwan, Indonesia, Thailand and Korea. New Zealand Rovers, in particular, hold a National Moot every year over the Easter holiday weekend, where international participants are always openly welcomed. In Canada, there are specialist Rover groups geared towards specific vocations, including first-aid, police, fire and paramedic services.

A Baden-Powell Award still forms the Rover award scheme in associations in several countries including Australia, Canada, New Zealand, South Africa, India, Pakistan, Hong Kong and Singapore and for several of the traditional Scout associations that retained Rovers.

== See also ==
- Ranger (Girl Guide)
