= Rovering to Success =

1922 book by Robert Baden-Powell

- Rovering to Success cover
- Author: Robert Baden-Powell
- Illustrator: Robert Baden-Powell
- Language: English
- Publisher: Herbert Jenkins Limited
- Publication date: 1922
- Publication place: United Kingdom

Rovering to Success is a life-guide book written and illustrated by Robert Baden-Powell and published in two editions from June 1922 as a handbook for The Boy Scouts Association's Rovers program which had been launched in November 1919. It has a theme of paddling a canoe through life. The original edition and printings of the second edition were subtitled "A Book of Life-Sport for Young Men" but this was changed to "A Guide for Young Manhood" in the later printings, which ran until 1964. It was used by The Boy Scouts Association as the handbook of its Rover program until 1966, when its review, The Chief Scouts' Advance Party Report, recommended that "a new Training Section be formed to replace the existing Senior Scout and Rover Scout Sections".

== Contents ==
The book sets out a philosophy for living in the adult world rather than being an instructional handbook. It is written in the style of advice from a father or uncle and it has been suggested that it was partly intended for future reading by Baden-Powell's son, Peter, who was nine years old when it was published. The theme of the book is taken from the popular 19th-century song; “Never sit down with a tear or a frown, but paddle your own canoe”, which was written by the American poet Sarah T. Bolton in 1850 but is not attributed.

The chapters are:

- How to be happy though rich – or poor, providing an overview of Baden-Powell’s ideas for leading a happy and fulfilled life, with many references to himself and his military career eclectically mixed with glib quotes from personalities as diverse as Abraham Lincoln, Mark Twain and Tennyson.
- "Rocks you are likely to bump on" (while paddling your own canoe):

- I. Horses, which deals with gambling.
- II. Wine, on the perils of alcohol.
- III. Women, which attempts very basic sex education, which was rare at the time but is laden with Victorian notions of racial purity and abstinence and denigratingly labels women as a "bump" and categorises women as good and bad.
- IV. Cuckoos and Humbugs which warns against political extremism and, while encouraging service within established parties (Baden-Powell's brother, George Baden-Powell, had been a Conservative MP), also encouraged acceptance.
- V. Irreligion, in which Baden-Powell propounds pantheism and moral ethics rather than scriptures and theology and contends that understanding of God can be found through nature study and helping others and includes a quote from The Quran.

- Rovering – the Aim of the Rover Brotherhood, which explains the purpose and structure of Rovers and gives a wide range of suggestions for activities and service projects that Rovers could undertake. The book finishes with the last two verses (switched in order) of “The Call of the Wild" from “Songs of a Sourdough” by Robert W. Service, and the message; "Happiness is yours if only you paddle your canoe aright. With all my heart I wish you success, and the Scouts’ wish – GOOD CAMPING!".

== Writing and publication and use as a handbook ==
Baden-Powell wrote the manuscript in 1921 and his wife, Olave, typed it in November 1921 The book was published by Herbert Jenkins in June 1922. It was translated into many other languages. The second edition ran to 26 impressions in the United Kingdom, the last appearing in 1964.
