= Scouting and Guiding in Victoria =

Australian scouting organisation

Scouting started in Victoria, Australia, as early as 1907 and local Boy Scout patrols and troops formed independently. Several separate central organisations began operating including Boys' Brigade Scouts, Church Lads' Brigade Scouts, Chums Scouts, Imperial Boy Scouts, Girl Peace Scouts, Imperial Boy Scouts Victoria Section, Imperial Boy Scouts Victorian Section, Gippsland Boy Scouts Association, Australian Boy Scouts, Australian Imperial Boy Scouts, The Boy Scouts Association, Life-Saving Scouts of the Salvation Army and Methodist Boy Scouts.

Current scouting organisations in Victoria include Scouts Victoria, Russian Scouts, Polish Scouting Association ZHP, Plast Ukrainian Scouts, Hungarian Scouts, Lithuanian Scouts and Estonian Scouts, the Ethnic Scouts and Guides Association of Victoria (ESGAV), Girl Guides Victoria and the Assemblies of God Royal Rangers and Salvation Army's Guards and Legion (SAGALA).

== History ==
"The cradle of Scouting in Victoria was the Tooronga Rd. State School, Caulfield; where in late 1907 one of the pupils, Roy McIndoe, received from a friend in England, who had been a member of the experimental camp at Brownsea Island, some pamphlets which had been issued by the Chief. These he showed to his mates who immediately got red shirts, their father's old felt hats, formed 'patrols' and 'whooped round the place like Red Indians'. Later in 1908 when they received the first copies of Scouting for Boys, they settled down to genuine Scouting."

It is unclear which was the first Scout troop in Victoria, but by the end of 1908, there were 11 scout troops in Victoria. In the early years, a number of central Scout organisations existed in Victoria (see Scouting and Guiding in Australia).

== Scouts Australia - Victorian Branch ==
Scouts Victoria
- Headquarters: 152 Forster Rd, Mount Waverley
- Country: Australia
- Founded: 1923
- Founder: The Boy Scouts Association
- Membership: 18,592 total youth members 5316 total adult leaders (2018)
- Chief Scout: Shane Jacobson
- Chief Commissioner: Rodney Byrnes
- Website www.scoutsvictoria.com.au

Scouts Victoria is a branch of Scouts Australia that delivers its programs in Victoria for children and youths from the ages of 6 to and including 25. In 1923, The Boy Scouts Association of the United Kingdom formed a branch in Victoria which was incorporated in 1932 and, upon the formation of The Scout Association of Australia in 1958, became its Victorian branch. The Branch is currently divided into eleven Regions: Bays, Eastern, Gippsland, Lerderderg, Loddon Mallee, Melbourne, Mt Dandenong, Northern, West Coast, and Western. From 2007 to 2019, Scouts Victoria experienced a resurgence. Some Scouts Victoria scout groups cater mostly to specific ethnic groups, such as 6th Box Hill (Greek) and The 5th Melbourne/1st Latvian Scout Group which is part of the Latvian Scouts organisation and is also registered with Scouts Australia.

Major Scouts Victoria events include the Kangaree for Joey Scouts (held every two years at Lardner Park), the Cuboree for Cub Scouts (held every three years at Gilwell Scout Park), Stradbroke Cup and BayJam for Scouts, Anything Goes, Victorian Gathering and Hoadley Hide for Venturer Scouts, and Surfmoot and Mudbash for Rover Scouts.

In 2007, Scouts Victoria hosted the 21st Australian Scout Jamboree (AJ2007) in Elmore. In 2014, four universities (La Trobe University, Victoria University, Federation University and Australian Catholic University) established recognition of the Queen's Scout Award (the peak award in the Venturer Scouts section) for university entry purposes. In February 2015, thousands of Victorian Scouts participated in Big Day Scout, which involved a citywide social media scavenger hunt for Scouting street art across Melbourne. Following the scavenger hunt, Shane Jacobson (an Australian actor and former Scout) was invested as Chief Scout of Victoria at the Myer Music Bowl in front of 15,000 Scouts and their families. It was the first time any Chief Scout in Australia, a figurehead role, was not a state governor.

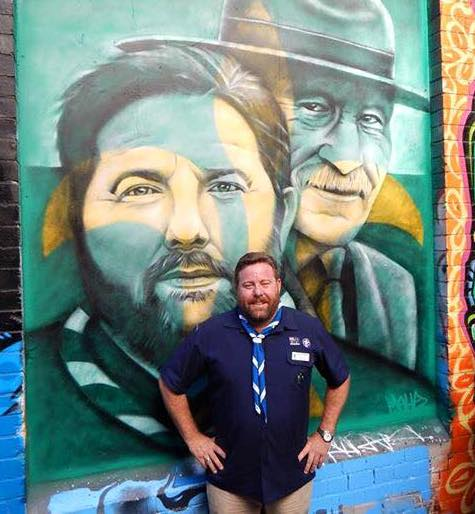
Shane Jacobson, Chief Scout of Victoria and Australian actor, with street art in Melbourne depicting himself and Scouting's founder Lord Baden-Powell

=== Training sections ===
- Joey Scouts (aged 5–7 years)
- Cub Scouts (aged 8–10 years)
- Scouts (aged 11–14 years)
- Venturer Scouts (aged 15–17 years)
- Rover Scouts (aged 18–25 years)

=== Adventurous activities ===
Scouts Victoria operates a number of adventurous activities teams and members can gain Outdoor Recreation Certificate II and III qualifications. The teams are:

- Abseiling
- Air activities
- Amateur radio
- Bushwalking
- Canoeing and kayaking
- Caving
- Four wheel driving
- Rafting
- Rock-climbing
- Ropes, including high ropes, rope bridges, aerial rRunways
- Sailing and power-boating
- Scuba diving
- Ski touring
- Survival
- Water skiing

=== Gilwell Park ===
Gilwell Park, named after the original Gilwell Park in the United Kingdom, is a campsite, activity and training centre for Scouts Victoria. The 250 acres (1.01 km^{2}) property is located on both sides of the Launching Place Road, Gembrook. Charles Hoadley was one of the founders and the warden from 1924 until his death in 1947. In 1920, the first leader training course was held at what would become Gilwell Park, after it was donated to The Scout Association. Robert Baden-Powell approved the naming of the new training centre and visited it twice, in 1931 and again in 1935. One of the features of the park is the Chief's Gate, built specially for Baden-Powell, which guards the entrance to The Chief's Approach. Other locations include The Gauntlet Commando course — built for the World Rover Moot and the Lochan, a lake that is famously freezing all year round — even in the depths of summer. The EM Derrick Pack Holiday Centre, a bunkhouse and hall/kitchen that is primarily used by Cub Packs for their Pack Holidays, as well as for training courses, and the Hoadley and deMolnar Training Areas are dedicated to Wood Badge Training, though like most buildings they are open for hiring. Gilwell Park is home to the tri-annual Victorian Cuboree, a five-day camp that hosts thousands of Cub Scouts as well as hundreds of Leaders, Venturers and Rovers. In 2012 a high ropes challenge course, funded by the Victorian State Government, was opened. Two films have been made at Gilwell Park: the 2008 Australian film Dying Breed and the 2009 film Where the Wild Things Are. Gilwell Park is currently the subject of attempts to make it financially viable by attempting to make it more attractive to schools and groups for use during the week.

=== Chief Commissioners of Scouts Victoria ===
- 1909–1911 Eyrl Lister DSO, VD, Chief Scoutmaster of the Imperial Boy Scouts
- 1911–1917 W.E. Wears CE, Chief Scoutmaster of the Imperial Boy Scouts, Victorian Section
- 1917 J.E. Jenkins
- 1917–1918 L.H. Fairnie
- 1918–1919 Donald McDonald
- 1919–1921 Harold Cohen CMG, DSO
- 1921–1923 V.J. Whitehead
- 1923–1928 C.P. Middleton
- 1928–1937 Charles Hoadley CBE, Polar Medal (Hoadley Hide annual Venturers event is named in his honour)
- 1937–1951 G.W.S. Anderson MBE
- 1952–1958 Roy Nichols CMG, OBE
- 1958–1962 Robert Risson KB, CBE, DSO, OST J, ED
- 1963–1968 Rolf McKellar OBE
- 1968–1976 Jim Butchart OBE
- 1976–1979 Norm Johnson OBE
- 1979–1986 Neil Westaway AM
- 1986–1992 William Wells AM
- 1992–2001 John Ravenhall AM
- 2001–2008 Alston Park AM
- 2008–2014 Bob Taylor AM
- 2014–2020 Brendan Watson OAM
- 2020– Rod Byrnes

Scouting has played an important role in the City of Maroondah for more than a century, beginning with the formation of the 1st Croydon Scout Group in 1915. Over time, multiple Croydon-based Scout Groups merged to form Croydon Central Scout Group, which continues to operate today and celebrates its 110th anniversary in 2025. The Croydon Central Scout Hall on Kent Avenue was built in 1929 and remains one of the district’s longest continuously used community buildings.

== Ethnic Scouts associations ==
Russian Scouts, Polish Scouting Association (ZHP), Plast Ukrainian Scouts, Hungarian Scouts, Lithuanian Scouts, and Estonian Scouts associations operate in Victoria and were formed in the 1940s as scouts in exile associations. In the late 1940s these associations formed the Ethnic Scout and Guide Association of Victoria (ESGAV).

== Girl Guides Victoria ==
Girl Guides Victoria is a member organisation of Girl Guides Australia. Guides follow the programme approved at national level. Girl Guides Victoria is divided into twenty-six regions. Lone Guiding also operates in Victoria.

The Florence Nightingale Girl Aids were established in 1909, by Wynifred Gipps, and were recognised as Baden-Powell Girl Guides in 1911. Originally refused a warrant as a Guide Leader as being too young, when Gipps reached the age of 21, in April 1912, she became the first warranted Guide Leader in Australia. On 6 February 1911, the 1st Hawthorn Company was formed, led by Louie Kerr. This Company claims to the first in Australia with the full name "Baden-Powell Girl Guides". A Guiding organisation for Victoria was formalised in 1921 and the first State Commissioner was Lady Stradbroke.

Girl Guides in Victoria are taking the pledge to Stand Against Poverty, and meet and exceed the Millennium Development Goals.

=== State Commissioners ===
- 1922–1926 Helena, Lady Stradbroke
- 1926–1931 Finola, Lady Somers
- 1931–1948 Lady Chauvel
- 1948–1953 Beverley Orr
- 1953–1958 Margaret Curtis-Otter
- 1958–1963 Irene Fairbairn
- 1963–1968 Lady Joyce Price
- 1968–1973 Charlotte Renshaw Jones
- 1973–1978 Joan Grimwade
- 1978–1983 Marjorie West
- 1983–1988 Maren Chandler
- 1988–1993 Dorothy Woolley
- 1993–1998 Heather Barton
- 1998–2003 Jane Scarlett
- 2003–2008 Ellen Boyd
- 2008–2011 Noella Kershaw
- 2011 – Margaret Devlin (only served one year due to the restructuring of Girl Guides Victoria)
- 2012–2013 Robinette Emonson

=== State badge ===
By 1926, the state badge was a sprig of wattle in enamel. An appeal was made for alternative designs and in 1927, a new design was chosen. Margaret Moore, a Guider and Commissioner suggested the design and it was drawn by Dorothea Holtz. The design was the Southern Cross on a blue lozenge surmounted by a crown. The same badge is currently still in use.

=== Properties ===
Several of Girl Guides Victoria's properties are owned and/or managed in conjunction with Scouts Australia. These include Lockington, Bungle Boori and the Guide-Scout Water Activities Centre. The headquarters was named the Joyce Price Centre in honour of the only Australian to be chairman of the World Association of Girl Guides and Girl Scouts.

==== Britannia Park ====
Britannia Park is a campsite belonging to Girl Guides Victoria. It is located near Yarra Junction in Victoria, Australia. It is 72 km east of Melbourne. The site covers 42 acres (170,000 m^{2}), although the original purchase was smaller.

==== Burnet Park ====
Burnet Park is a campsite located between Traralgon and Morwell. There are three campsites and Illangi - the house on the hill, with accommodation for 29. There is also a tree house platform.

The site was part of Burnet's farm and was donated to the Guiding movement by the Burnet family for camping and outdoor recreation.

==== Guide-Scout Water Activities Centre ====
The Guide-Scout Water Activities Centre is located on Port Philip Bay. Activities include sailing, canoeing and paddle-boarding.

=== Lady Stradbroke Cup ===
The Lady Stadbroke Cup is an annual competition and the winners are presented with the Lady Stradbroke Cup. The cup was presented to the then Girl Guides Association of Victoria by Lady Stradbroke in 1926.

=== Women of Note and the Blue and Gold Society ===
The purpose of the Blue and Gold Society is to promote Guiding in the community. This is achieved by events such as cocktail parties with guest speakers. Membership of the society is open to both men and women.

Women of Note is a group of exceptional women, often professional women or business women, who support Girl Guides Victoria. They share their skills through the Girl Guides Victoria Mentor Program. Women of Note also hold Mentor Breakfasts across regional and metropolitan Melbourne. At these breakfasts, Year 11 students meet with the group to develop career networks.

== Gang Shows and other theatrical experiences ==
- Melbourne Gang Show, - started in 1953. "Wonderful Life", by Ralph Reader, is used as its signature tune. From its 25th season through to its 49th, cast and crew would also sing "Touch of Silver" after the curtain came down on the final performance, but in 2002, for the 50th Melbourne Gang Show, this was replaced by "Golden Days" with lyrics by John Jenkins and music by Alexandra Boemo and this new song continues to be used in this way.
- Whitehorse Showtime, started in 1965, is presented by the Scouts and Guides of the Mount Dandenong Region. Currently, this is the largest Scout and Guide show in the Southern Hemisphere. Its signature song is "So As We Go Along" and cast and crew members wear a purple scarf.
- Camberwell Showtime, started in 1965, is written, directed and performed by the Scouts and Guides of Boroondara and has its signature song "scarves of blue"
- Strzelecki Showtime, - started in 1969, is written and presented by Strzelecki District Scouts with local Guides (Latrobe Valley).
- Sunraysia Gang Show, - started in 1976, held in the state's North West.
- South Metro Showtime, - started in 1982 in Melbourne.

== See also ==
- Baden-Powell Scouts' Association
- Glossary of Australian Scouting terms
- Kookaburra (song)
- John Russell Savige
- Scouting and Guiding in Australia
