= Australian Scout Jamboree =

Scout jamboree in Australia

The Scout Association of Australia
- Country: Australia
- Founded: 1958
- Founder: The Boy Scouts Association of the United Kingdom

The Australian Scout Jamboree is a national jamboree, now overseen by The Scout Association of Australia. They have been held since 1934, regularly except for 1942 and 1945, due to World War II, and 2022, due to the COVID-19 pandemic. Jamborees are generally held early in January and typically run for ten nights.

The first jamboree in 1934 was held in Frankston, Victoria, hosted by The Boy Scouts Association, Victorian Branch and was attended by The Boy Scouts Association’s Chief Scout, Robert Baden-Powell.

The Frankston district still uses the original jamboree logo as its district emblem.

== Early events ==
The 1st World Scout Jamboree was at Olympia London in July/August 1920, and there were Australian and Australian state contingents to this and the subsequent international jamborees. Whilst the 1934 Frankston jamboree was designated the 'first' Australian Jamboree, there were earlier events. Australians also attended a jamboree in Dunedin, New Zealand, in January 1926.

The January 1922 Scout corroboree at the Sydney Showgrounds totalled over 540 youth members (with a Victorian contingent of 90 scouts, South Australia with 100, Queensland with 100, and Sydney northern district between 250 and 300 scouts). The January 1923 Scout corroboree in Melbourne saw a NSW contingent of 920 scouts. The 'all-Australian Scout Corroboree' of January 1924 in Adelaide expected about 1500 scouts, with a NSW contingent of 500 scouts, Victoria of 400, Queensland of 50, a first time with Western Australia of 30, and Tasmania of 25 scouts. Activities included tent pitching, fire lighting, billy boiling, trek card obstacle race, and cyclist stretcher races.

From 15 January 1927, the Lake Sorrell reservoir, 40 miles (64 km) from Hobart, Tasmania was the site of an all-Australian 'jamboree' with about 300 Scouts. Limited to First Class (award) scouts, after the event it was also referred to as the 'all Australian Corroboree', the New South Wales contingent having 151 participants. By this time, the word 'jamboree' was becoming more known.

Corroborees continued with the Seventh 'All-Australian' Scout Corroboree at coastal Lake Illawarra, NSW in January 1930, with the 1936 Australian Scout Corroboree looking like a national jamboree: 26 December 1936 to 4 January 1937, Belair National Park, South Australia, of 4000 scouts with contingents including all Australian states, Ceylon, Nauru, New Zealand, and South Africa.

== Administration ==
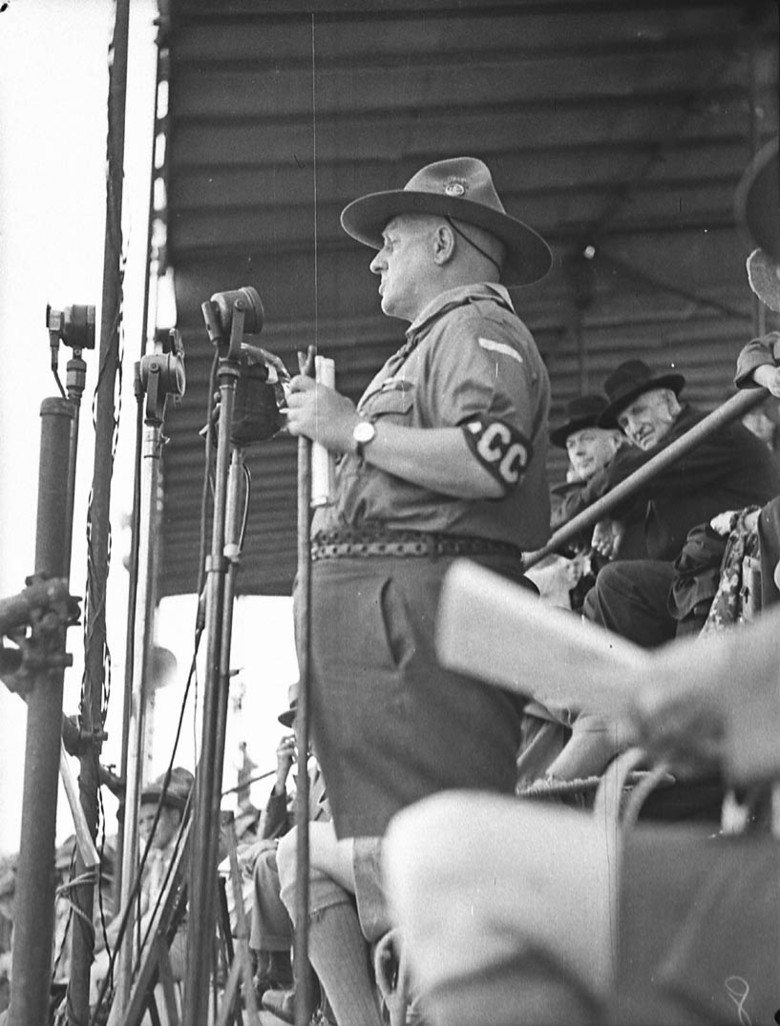
Scouts Jamboree, Lindfield, 1 July 1939

Traditionally, Australian Jamborees were hosted on a rotational basis, with the order of hosting being South Australia, Victoria, Queensland, and New South Wales.

Each Scouting Branch (State) is the effective host of the jamboree and takes responsibility for its management. The host for the next jamboree has been opened to a tendering process.

Australian jamborees are held on a triennial basis. Following AJ2025, Scouts Australia planned to move to a quadrennial basis, however this decision was reversed. The next Australian jamboree will be held in January 2028.

By world standards, Australian jamborees are medium-sized, with the largest jamborees being held in Europe and North America and generally hosting between 35,000 and 40,000 participants.

== Organisational structure ==
=== Committee ===
The Jamboree Executive Committee (JEC) has the primary task of organising and running the event. The host state takes the responsibility for forming a JEC from local scouts and scouters.

=== Contingents ===
The largest organisational unit of the jamboree is a contingent. There is one contingent for each of the Australian States and Territories, a contingent representing the national leadership of Scouts Australia, as well as New Zealand and other international contingents.

A unit consists of about 36 Scouts, six patrols of youth members and six to seven leaders. Each unit shares a common camping area where they will cook, sleep and socialise for the duration of the jamboree. Units are generally made up of members of the same state contingent, and overseas contingents are mixed into domestic units.

Youth members in units are further subdivided into patrols of five or six Scouts. The most experienced Scout is generally given the task of being 'patrol leader' ('PL'), and another experienced Scout is assigned as 'assistant patrol leader' ('APL'). Scouts work in patrols for all activities and tasks during the jamboree. PLs are given special prizes and a special lunch to acknowledge the important task they carry out.

Scouts must be between the age of 11 and 14; although in AJ2025, this included Venturer Scouts. Typically, attendees must also have earned badges for Milestone 1, Outdoor Adventure Skills Stage 3 in Bushcraft, Bushwalking, and Camping, and slept ten nights under canvas at scout activities. Participants are expected to cook for themselves, keeping their sleeping area and campsite clean and tidy, participate in their assigned activities, and cope with the experience of being away from home for the period of the jamboree.

=== Subcamps ===
A jamboree campsite may be broken up into several subcamps. Each subcamp will contain troop-lines of units from various contingents, each site usually having a decorated gateway. The subcamps are named according to the jamboree. For instance, the service leaders subcamp at the 13th Jamboree at Collingwood Park was named Nyeri, the home of Scouting's founder.

For AJ2025 in Queensland, the three youth subcamps were Fraser Coast (region), Tuan (state forest), Cheeli (named for Cheelii lagoon), and two service leader subcamps were Wook-Koo (nearby First Nations park) and Mungomery (vine forest). An additional subcamp informally named K'Gari (island) hosted members of the Jamboree Executive Committee.

== List of jamborees ==
No.	Name	Location	Dates	Participants	Notes
1	–	Frankston, Victoria	27 December 1934 to 7 January 1935	11,500 youth members	Attended by Lord and Lady Baden-Powell. Overseas contingents from at least nine countries, and up to 1,000 Girl Guides. For the last activity of the jamboree, Rover Scouts ran an extensive program of hikes from Powelltown to Gilwell Park in Gembrook. (Powelltown's name is unrelated to Baden-Powell.)
2	–	Bradfield, Sydney, New South Wales	29 December 1938 to 9 January 1939	9,000	Attended by Deputy World Chief Scout, Lord Hampton. Five sub-camps. Overseas contingents were from England, Scotland, France, South Africa, India, Ceylon, and Nauru. Some newspapers of the time called it a world jamboree, but it was not recognised as such. It was estimated to have had 120,000 visitors. Site is now part of West Lindfield suburb.
–	–	Launceston, Tasmania	1942	–	Not held due to World War II. The Boy Scouts' Association of Tasmania sought in June 1939 to host a national, Empire, or world jamboree to mark the tercentenary of the European discovery of the island on 24 November 1642, at the Punchbowl Reserve, Launceston. To go before the national council in Hobart in October 1939, it was unforeseen that Australia would be at war on 3 September 1939.
3	Pan-Pacific Jamboree	Clifford Park, Wonga Park, Victoria	December 1948	10,000	Also billed as the Pan-Pacific Jamboree. Attended by the World Chief Scout, Lord Rowallan. Overseas contingents from at least twenty countries, including Canada, Fiji, Hong Kong, India, Latvia, Lithuania, Malaya, Nauru, New Caledonia, New Zealand, Pakistan (20 scouts), Philippines (24 scouts), South Africa, and lone scouts from France and Lebanon. Girl Guides also assisted, mostly in the hospital. Held on the 1,000 acres (400 ha) property 'Yarra Brae', of Hon. Lewis Clifford. Subcamps were numbered.
4	Pan-Pacific Jamboree	Greystanes, Sydney, New South Wales	29 December 1952 to 9 January 1953	11,000	Site was on loaned Blue Metal Quarries Limited land. Overseas contingents from at least fifteen countries. Campsite streets were named after explorers, such as 'Burke and Wills Trail'.
5	Pan-Pacific Jamboree	Clifford Park, Wonga Park, Victoria	28 December 1955 to 9 January 1956	12,000	Held on the 1,000 acres (400 ha) property 'Yarra Brae', of Hon. Lewis Clifford. Featured a 'Boomerang Arch' gateway. Considered the wettest Australian jamboree and nicknamed the 'Mudboree'.
6	6th	Lansdowne, Sydney, New South Wales	29 December 1960 to 9 January 1961	15,000	Sixteen overseas contingents. Public open day on Sunday, 1 January 1961. Cub Day on Tuesday, 3 January 1961 saw 8,000 wolf cubs attend. World Chief Scout Sir Charles Maclean to attend. Senior Scouts would venture with Paddy Pallin, through the Blue Mountains. Seven sub-camps over 40 acres (16 ha) site.
7	7th	Dandenong, Victoria	29 December 1964 to 8 January 1965	16,000	Jamboree award of 'Southern Cross Award' for scouts, and 'Capricornian Award' for senior scouts. Activities included Skillorama, Challenge Valley, Gang Show, New Year's Day concert. Held at Nerre Nerre Warren, on site of old police paddocks, 3 miles (4.8 km) north of Dandenong, covering 280 ha (700 acres). Overseas contingents from at least seven countries, as well as Girl Guides. Eight sub-camps. World Chief Scout Sir Charles Maclean officially closed the jamboree.
8	8th	Jindalee, Brisbane, Queensland	28 December 1967 to 6 January 1968	15,000	Theme of 'The dawn of friendship'. Well-forested area even after 14,000 tent poles cut. Jamboree award of 'Southern Cross Award' for scouts, and 'Capricornian Award' for senior scouts. Overseas contingents from at least eighteen countries. For Tasmanian scouts, they had to be 13 years-of-age by the jamboree, and would cost A$106 (in 2022, about A$1,510), travelling by train from Melbourne to Brisbane. The site today is around Bilga Street, Middle Park suburb, near Jamboree Heights (GPS 27.552858°S 152.927858°E).
9	9th; Jamboree of New Endeavour	Leppington, Sydney, New South Wales	29 December 1970 to 9 January 1971	15,000 (12,000 youth members, 3,000 adults)	Celebrating the Captain Cook Bicentennial. Overseas contingents from at least seven countries. Participant cost about A$155 (in 2022, about A$2,020), must be between 12 and 15, reached Second Class scout, and ten nights under canvas.
10	10th	Woodhouse, Piccadilly, South Australia	28 December 1973 to 6 January 1974	12,000	Scouts had to be between 12 and 15, hold the Second Class/Pioneer badge under the 'New Design' scheme, at least ten nights under canvas, able to do own laundry and mending, and pass the 'jamboree cooks' test. The peak award is the 'Jamboree Pentathlon Award'.
11	11th	Rossmoyne Park, Dandenong, Victoria	29 December 1976 to 6 January 1977	14,000	Due to a total fire ban, the A$800 opening ceremony fireworks display was cancelled, but held for the closing ceremony. The event newspaper was called the 'Rossmoyne Rag'.
12	12th	Perry Lakes, Perth, Western Australia	29 December 1979 to 7 January 1980	9,400 (8,000 youth members, 1,400 adults, 1,800 overseas scouts (Note: For 12th Australian Jamboree, not able to determine if youth numbers include or are separate to overseas scout numbers.))	Fourth Asia-Pacific Scout Jamboree (and first held in Australia). The first jamboree in Western Australia, and the 150th year of the founding of the State.
13	13th	Collingwood Park, Ipswich, Queensland	December 1982 to January 1983	19,600	With the 75th anniversary of Scouting in Australia, there was a pre-stamped envelope, showing B.-P., and a c. 1918 youth membership certificate. Peak award was the 'Diamond Award', including participation in an obstacle course, go-kart racing, and a Brisbane discovery trip.
14	14th	Cataract Scout Park, Sydney, New South Wales	29 December 1985 to 9 January 1986	16,000	Theme of 'Adventure' with activities including 'Challenge Valley' and 'Bicycle bungle'. The site was also used for the 16th World Scout Jamboree from 30 December 1987 to 10 January 1988.
15	15th; Great Mates Jamboree	Woodhouse, Piccadilly, South Australia	31 December 1988 to 9 January 1989	10,000	Last official function of the Australian Bicentenary celebrations.
16	AJ1992	Ballarat, Victoria	3 to 12 January 1992	15,000	Theme of 'Welcome stranger, farewell friend'. Overseas contingents from thirty countries, including three scouts and a leader in the first Russian overseas contingent in more than seventy years. Held at Victoria Park cricket pitches.
17	AJ 1994/1995	Perry Lakes, Perth, Western Australia	30 December 1994 to 8 January 1995	13,000	Theme of 'Jamboree of Far Horizons'. Also the 15th Asia-Pacific Scout Jamboree. Peak award is the 'Alpha Centauri Award'.
18	AJ1998	Springfield, Ipswich, Queensland	2 to 11 January 1998	15,000	Overseas contingents from 23 countries with 187 scouts. Participant cost about A$900 (in 2022, about A$1,700)
19	AJ2001	Cataract Scout Park, Sydney, New South Wales	3 to 13 January 2001	12,000	Also 22nd Asia-Pacific Scout Jamboree. Participants had to hold their Pioneer badge.
20	AJ2004	Woodhouse, Piccadilly, South Australia	5 to 15 January 2004	11,000	
21	AJ2007	Elmore, Victoria	1 to 13 January 2007	12,000 (8,500 youth members, 3,500 adults)	Held on the Elmore Field Days site. Theme of 'Get in the Game'. Overseas contingents from 30 countries with 300 scouts. As the first major Scout event in 2007, it was the first to celebrate 100 years of Scouting.
22	AJ2010	Cataract Scout Park, Sydney, New South Wales	4 to 14 January 2010	12,000 (8,500 youth members, 3,500 adults)	Theme of 'Test your limits'.
23	AJ2013	Maryborough, Queensland	2 to 12 January 2013	11,000	Theme of 'Dream it, live it'. Held at the Maryborough Showgrounds. Overseas contingents from fourteen countries with 250 scouts.
24	AJ2016	Cataract Scout Park, Sydney, New South Wales	3 to 13 January 2016	–	Theme of 'Leap into adventure'.
25	AJ2019	The Bend Motorsport Park, Tailem Bend, Murraylands, South Australia	4 to 13 January 2019	10,700 (8,500 youth members, 2,200 adults)	Theme of 'Friends for life'. The jamboree became the ninth-largest town in South Australia. Activities included motorsport, gliding, and 'Metro Mania' adventure into Port Adelaide or Glenelg.
–	AJ2022	Elmore, Victoria	3 to 13 January 2022	–	Cancelled on 23 January 2021 due to the COVID-19 pandemic. An alternative event, VicJam, was held for Victorian participants.
26	AJ2025	Maryborough, Queensland	6 to 15 January 2025	9,200 (7,500 youth members, 1,700 adults)	Themed as "Your quest, your way!". Maryborough Showgrounds. Overseas contingents numbered 500 participants. For the first time, venturer scouts who had not turned 17 by the start of the jamboree could be program participants.
27	AJ2028	Elmore, Victoria	28 December 2027 to 5 January 2028	–	Theme of "Feel the freedom".

== Other participants ==
Older members, mainly Venturers and Rovers, also attend the event as 'service leaders' to assist with activities and other tasks. Younger members, including Joey Scouts and Cub Scouts, and families and friends of Scouting are able to visit the site as day visitors, especially on Future Scout Day (Market Day), where games and stalls are set up by the jamboree's scouts.

== Activities ==
The programme of the 2nd Australian Jamboree (1938, north Sydney) saw contingents arrive (Thursday, 29 December 1938), 5000 scouts marching through Sydney (Friday), official opening and invitational campfires (Saturday), Scouts' Own services and campfire (Sunday), Cub Day (Monday), Fraternising Day with troop visitations between subcamps, Gilwell reunion, veterans' reunion (Tuesday), Overseas Day with displays, with a public campfire (Wednesday), Sea Scout Day with an afternoon display on the Lane Cove River (Thursday), Excursion Day for sight-seeing (Friday), Girl Guide Day and night displays (Saturday), Farewell Day with an optional Scouts' Own, finishing with a general campfire in the arena in the evening (Sunday), and the final day as Closing Day to break camp (Monday, 9 January 1939).

Activities for the AJ2019 (Tailem Bend, SA) included:

- The Smash Zone – an activity in which nine scouts were given two minutes to smash three cars
- Ice skating
- A camp inside a camp at Woodhouse, the site of the 2004 Australian Jamboree. Activities such as pioneering, high ropes and low ropes, archery tag, orienteering, an arcade room and an obstacle course were included
- BMX biking
- Mud pits
- Abseiling and rock climbing
- Mountain biking
- A day exploring in Adelaide
- Land sailing
- Shooting
- Flying – like the 2007 Jamboree, AJ2019 had an airstrip on site
- Skateboarding
- Raft building, canoeing, swimming, rowing and sailing at Wellington Marina
- Drone flying
- Crate stacking.

=== On site ===
During a jamboree there could be more people on the jamboree site than there are in some regional towns. Considerable resources and infrastructure are set up at the jamboree sites to ensure the safety, well-being and enjoyment of all participants. Some of the jamboree resources include:

- Main and secondary stage areas
- Shopping mall
- Socialisation areas
- Medical centre and first aid posts
- Internet café
- On-site radio station, to which both Scouts and leaders contribute
- On-site newspaper
- Transport depot
- Police and security
- Temporary on-site fire station
- Banking facilities including automatic cash point machines
- Warehousing of food and consumables
- Reliable communications infrastructure
- Fresh water supply and grey water processing.

=== AJ2007 activities ===
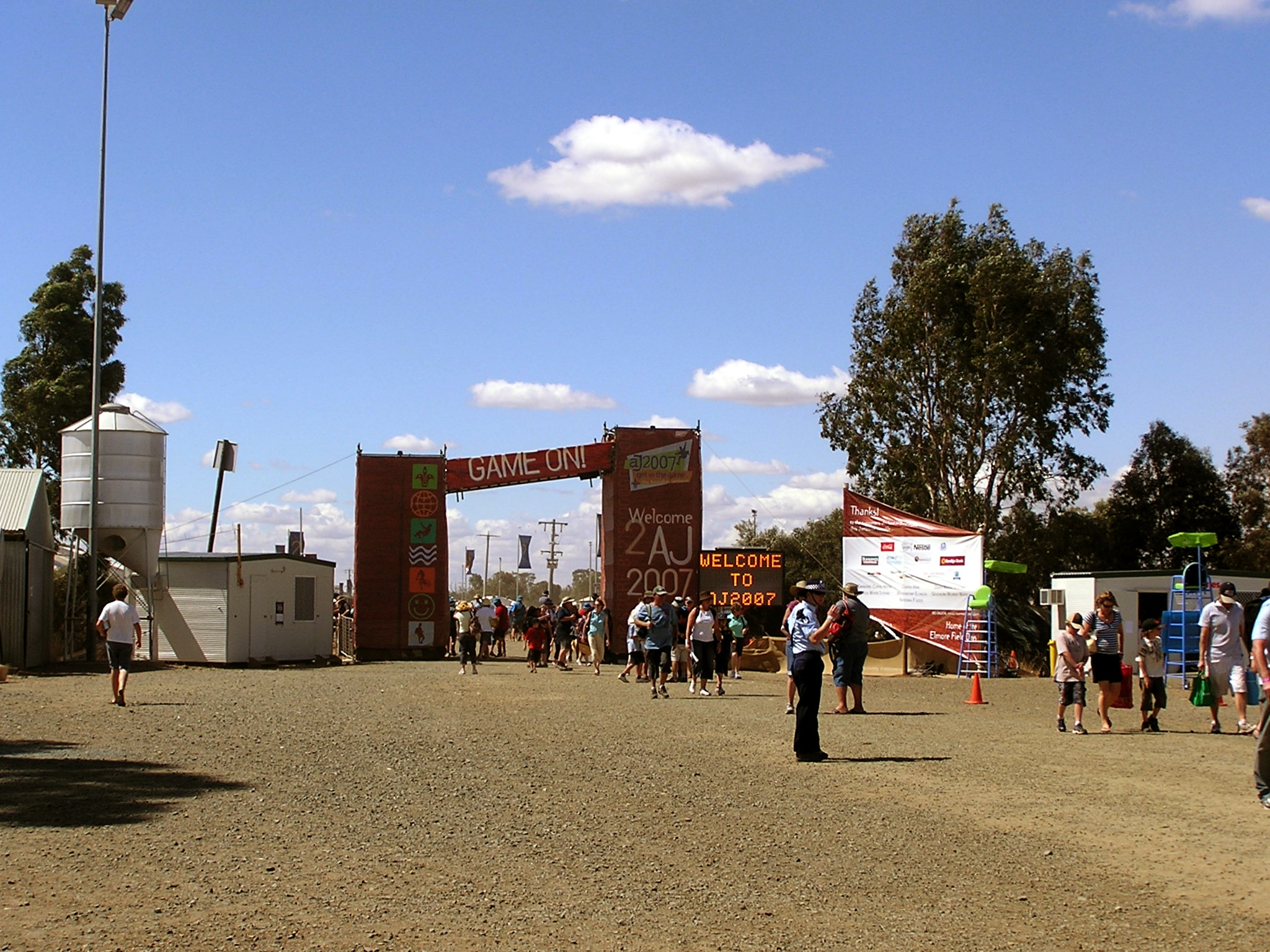
Entrance to AJ2007 on open day - 7 January 2007

==== Activities ====
The 21st Australian Jamboree in Elmore, Victoria, featured four off-site activities: Wet Wild and Windy, Riverforce, Bushwacked and Ready Set Bendigo.

On-site activities included Venture Extreme (learning about linking to Ventures), X-Site (circus-themed), Planet Blitz (focused on recycling and the environment), Rock Sports (rock climbing and abseiling) and Sky High (joy flights over the jamboree site, and at Rochester; the site having its own airstrip). Game On was another activity featuring six bases. It included sports, car smashing, mud and a giant water slide. Additional on-site activities included a carnival, circus skills, contingent HQ, subcamp activities and a mall.

Other activities included bush tracking and navigation, water activities (canoes, rafts and swimming at Lake Nagambie), exploring Historic Echuca, visiting Bendigo, and many mud activities.

An amateur radio station was also set up at the Jamboree by the Scout Radio and Electronics Service Unit (Victoria), utilising the special event call sign VK3JAM. A notable achievement of the station was a live link to the International Space Station when Scouts had to opportunity to talk with astronaut Sunita Williams in orbit of the earth.

==== Entertainment ====
AJ2007 featured much entertainment, with music acts such as Evermore, The Rogue Traders, Björn Again, Tripod and Taxiride performing on the main arena; along with numerous cover bands. Stunt planes and Motocross riders brought other nights alive; along with a Marquee called "The Place" which had themed discos.

==== Cleanup ====
Clean up of the site involved removing 200 tonnes of rubbish, dismantling 16,000 square metres of marquee, and removing 208 portable buildings on site, including toilets. It was expected to take a fortnight using 50 volunteers. The Scouts had already taken down their own tents and troop facilities.

=== AJ2025 activities ===
The Maryborough event featured a number of all-day off-site activities: Your sights (day trip to Maryborough), Your seaside (day trip to Hervey Bay beach), and Your attraction (Australia Zoo visit).

On-site activities, mostly half-day periods, included:

- Your action: Air blower soccer, archery, archery tag, beach games, hatchet throwing, laser tag, motorised cooler racing, and pioneering;
- Your adventure: Archery tag, trail cycling, geocaching, laser tag, orienteering, and a survival challenge;
- Your challenge (mud run);
- Your choice: Amateur radio, scout badge swapping, code quest, drones, escape rooms, garden games, heritage, laser cutting and etching, woggles and leatherwork, pyrography, woggles and woodworking;
- Your discovery: 3D printing, aqueduct challenges, exploration museum, Lego Masters, soldering, robot discovery, Scrabble, and rocket bottles; and
- Your summit: Zip lines, milk crate challenge, abseiling, and rock climbing.

The arena ('Your entertainment') had different evening events:

Date	Main arena	Mini arena
Monday 6 January 2025	Opening Ceremony, special guest Amy Shark	–
Tuesday 7 January 2025	Comedy Night, with Mel Buttle, Dave Hughes, and MC Terry Hansen	Open mic and karaoke night
Wednesday 8 January 2025	AJ's country hoe down, with The Smashing Bumpkins	AJ's biggest board game
Thursday 9 January 2025	Guest performance (Budjerah)	'AJ's Got Talent' heats
Friday 10 January 2025	Rock Night, with Kiss Tribute – Cancelled due to storms	Comedy night – Cancelled
Saturday 11 January 2025	Disney-themed wide game	'AJ's Got Talent' heats
Sunday 12 January 2025	International Night, and trivia	Chess championships
Monday 13 January 2025	Rave Night, with Havana Brown	'AJ's Got Talent' heats
Tuesday 14 January 2025	'AJ's Got Talent' finals	Trivia
Wednesday 15 January	Closing ceremony, with Natasha Rose and Sheppard	–
