= Scouting and Guiding in New South Wales =

The Scout Movement began in New South Wales (NSW), a state of Australia, in 1908. In the early years, local Boy Scout patrols and troops formed independently and several separate associations began operating including the Chums Scout Patrols, League of Boy Scouts, Girl Peace Scouts, Boys Brigade Scouts and Church Lads Brigade Scouts. These were later joined by The Boy Scouts Association, The Girl Guides Association and Life-Saving Scouts and Life Saving Guards of the Salvation Army. Some local Scout groups moved affiliation between the different associations.

Scouts and Scout Groups in NSW are now mostly registered with The Scout Association of Australia's NSW Branch and Girl Guides NSW, ACT & NT, a member organisation of Girl Guides Australia. There is also representation by the traditionalist Baden-Powell Scouts' Association. There are ethnic Scouting organisations including the Australian Association of Scouts in Exile (AASE), Polish Scouting Association, ZHP, Russian Scouts, Hungarian Scouts, Plast Ukrainian Scouts, Lithuanian Scouts, Latvian Scouts, Estonian Scouts and Guides and Homenetmen Armenian Scouts and Assyrian Eagle Scouts. There were formerly Maltese, Hellenic (Greek) and Vietnamese Scout associations.

== The Scout Association of Australia ==
The Scout Association of Australia New South Wales Branch
- Headquarters: 102 Bennelong Parkway, Homebush Bay
- Country: Australia
- Founded: 1914
- Founder: The Boy Scouts Association of the United Kingdom
- Membership: 12 members; 13,942 non-member enrolled youth participants; 3,114 non-member adult leaders and support staff (2022)
Chief Commissioner
Lloyd Nurthen (ceased 4/2026)
- Affiliation: Branch of The Scout Association of Australia
- Website www.nsw.scouts.com.au

The Scout Association of Australia New South Wales Branch is a committee which registers local Scout Groups, which are autonomous local scout organisations. In 1914, The Boy Scouts Association of the United Kingdom formed its NSW section, consisting of a council and committee. The committee was incorporated in 1928. When The Scout Association of Australia was formed in 1958, the committee became its NSW Branch.

The 2021-22, the NSW Branch claimed it had 13,942 enrolled youth participants, 3,114 adult leaders and support staff and 366 registered Scout Groups administered through 10 regions and 54 districts, and operates the organisations youth sections of Joeys, Cubs, Scouts, Venturers and Rovers.

The Regions are North West, Golden West, Greater Western Sydney, Hume, Riverina, South Coast and Tablelands, North Coast, Sydney North, South Metropolitan and Hunter and Coastal. The "country" Regions have a larger area in general. In 2004, the NSW Branch's then chief commissioner, Graeme Fordham, discussed the future for Australian Scouting on radio.

Activity Centres

The NSW Branch operates six activity centres:

Air Activity Centre, opened in 1971, at Camden Airport, Camden, 65 kilometres (40 mi) south-west of Sydney, has 4 Cessna 172's and provides flying experiences, gliding and a flying school for pilot training.

Alpine Activity Centre, at Jindabyne, 457 kilometres (284 mi) km south-west of Sydney, near the Snowy Mountains, consists of the Tony Balthasar Lodge and the Kanangra & Bluegum cottages.

Baden-Powell Activity Centre, opened in February 1929 (and visited by Lord and Lady Baden-Powell in 1931), is a 36-hectare (89-acre) site with accommodation and training facilities at Pennant Hills, adjoining Lane Cove National Park. Much early development work was done by unemployed who camped there during the Depression.

Cataract Activity Centre is a 160-hectare (400-acre) site near Appin, 71 kilometres (44 mi) south-west of Sydney, which can provide camping, bunk accommodation, and activities such as water slides, ropes courses, hiking, orienteering and an obstacle course. The site was granted by the Government of New South Wales in 1978. It hosted the 16th World Scout Jamboree in 1987–1988 and Australian Jamborees in 2010, 2016 and 2022.

Water Activities Centre at Woolwich opened in 1973 and provides experiences in canoeing, sailing and power boating and qualification courses including NSW Boat Licenses.

Several other centres are run by the Regions, such as Camp Ku-Ring-Gai Activity Centre, Ingleside Scout Camp, Camp Kurrajong, Camps Coutts, J. Harold Kaye Training Centre, Bundilla Scout Training Centre, Glenfield Scout Activity Centre and Mt. Keira Scout Camp.

=== Sexual abuse cases ===
Scouts Australia and its NSW Branch were called before the Royal Commission into Institutional Responses to Child Sexual Abuse for its failures in handling complaints against its leaders. Many incidents of sexual abuse occurred but were suppressed while Malcolm Maitland was general secretary (1963–83) and Terry Griffiths (politician) was Chief Executive (1983–88).

In 2014, Darryl Rubiolo, a former Scout Association of Australia, NSW Branch leader, publicity officer, leader trainer, St. George Area Commissioner and member of the NSW Branch council, was convicted of serial child sex offences against three boys aged 9, 13 and 14, between 1975 and 1987 while he was an official of the Scout Association of Australia. Rubiolo was sentenced to two-and-a-half years in prison with a non-parole period of one year.

In 2012, Steven Larkins, a former leader in NSW was convicted and imprisoned for offences he had committed 15 years earlier.

In February 2000, Roderick Albert Joseph CORRIE, a former NSW Branch Commissioner and scout leader of nearly thirty-two years was convicted of child sexual offences. "Corrie, one of the most senior and highly decorated Scouts in NSW, was jailed for seven years in February 2000 after pleading guilty in the District Court to eight most serious of 77 charges of sexually abusing children as young as 11, including rape and buggery, occurring 1969-1995. Two years earlier, Corrie had been convicted of eight charges of “aggravated indecent assault” and placed on a bond, given counseling and 70 hours of community service." The head of Scouts Australia, "Dr. Bruce Munro, apologized to the families of those abused after the Sydney Morning Herald obtained a copy of a 14-page report written by a senior Scout leader in 1981 that detailed serious allegations of Corrie abusing four boys, one aged 12 at the time. Munro admitted that those allegations were not properly investigated or referred to the police and that although Corrie was initially suspended, he was then simply allowed to transfer as a leader to a North Shore Scouting group. Even after police began investigating Corrie in 1994, he was allowed to continue having contact with, and sexually abusing, scouts until at least May 1995."

In June 2020, Paul Hayes pleaded guilty to 24 charges of sexual abuse from 1979-83 while a scout leader with the 1st Toongabbie West group. Many incidents had occurred in connection with a Gang Show. He had been allowed to transfer to a scout group in the Australian Capital Territory, where complaints were made against him, and then return to 1 Boronia in NSW in 1984 where further complaints were made.

Mark Geoffrey Fisher, scoutmaster at 1st Hunters Hill troop in NSW from 1969 to 1988, pleaded guilty to charges of 35 sex offenses involving eight boys aged between 11 and 15 between 1971-88.

== Girl Guides ==
Girl Guides NSW, ACT & NT
- Headquarters: Locked Bag 950, Strawberry Hills, NSW, 2012
- Country: Australia
- Founded: 1920
- Affiliation: Girl Guides Australia
- Website https://www.girlguides-nswactnt.org.au/

Regions

Girl Guides NSW, ACT & NT, a member organisation of Girl Guides Australia, operates 12 Regions, each managed by a volunteer Region Manager.

- ACT & South East NSW;
- Central West;
- Coastal Valleys;
- Cumberland Plains;
- Greater Rivers;
- North Pacific Coast;
- Northern Sydney;
- Northern Territory;
- North West Inland;
- South Coast & Highlands;
- Southern Sydney Rivers; and,
- Twin Rivers.

=== History ===
In 1920 Dame Margaret Davidson, wife of the Governor of NSW, called a special meeting of prominent women in Sydney, to try to interest them in starting Guiding in the State. They decided that Girl Guides was not for them as girls already had sufficient opportunities to be outdoors. Nella Levy read about this meeting in a newspaper and wrote to the newspaper contradicting this feeling. Subsequently, Levy was invited to Government House by Davidson. Davidson reportedly told her "Queen Mary would like to see Girl Guides in New South Wales, and I want you to start it." Levy took the challenge and travelled widely, recruiting volunteers, forming Companies and enrolling Guides.

In 1926, the Australian state Girl Guide branches formed a national federation called Girl Guides Australia. Girl Guides NSW, ACT & NT remains a member of Guides Australia and adheres to the Australian Guide Program (AGP).

In January 2020, Girl Guides NT merged with Girl Guides NSW and ACT to become Girl Guides NSW, ACT & NT. This brought members numbers to 7,800, allowed girls in the Northern Territory to access opportunities run in NSW and the ACT and sought to use administrative resources more efficiently.

=== Properties ===
Araluen, near Jindabyne, is popular for snow and summer activities.

RTS Tingira, in Cabarita, New South Wales, is a watersports centre offering canoeing, kayaking, rafting, rowing and sailing.

==== Sold ====
Since 2000, Girl Guides NSW has sold most of its major properties to maintain its operations.

Glengarry, sold in 2021 was in Turramurra in northern Sydney on the edge of the Ku-ring-gai Chase National Park and comprised 34 hectares of bushland with cleared camping areas and purpose-built training and accommodation facilities. The site was donated in the 1930s.

Tara, sold 2009 was in Silverdale, just southwest of Sydney and was over 101 acres (0.41 km^{2}). Girl Guides NSW & ACT had owned the property since 1971. Its Olave Centre accommodated 27 in dormitories, had a large commercial kitchen, common dining and lounge area and a large bathroom, including disabled use. Brownie Cottage accommodated 25 with a bathroom, fully equipped kitchen and a large dining/lounge area and the adjoining Northern Room was a fully self-contained studio which slept 4. Tolhurst Cottage was a quaint terracotta roofed cottage. Nella Levy Chapel was built in 1972 to commemorate the first Guider in NSW. Tara had sports fields, a carpark, equipment shed and campsites with piped water and enclosed fireplaces.

== Gang Shows and other theatrical experiences ==
A number of Scout and Guide Gang Shows (variety shows) are put on in NSW.

- Kirrawee Gang Show – started in 1959, located in Southern Sydney.
- Albury Gang Show – Started in 1965, in Albury, New South Wales.
- Cumberland Gang Show – started in 1970, located in the Greater Western Sydney Region.
- Hornsby Gang Show – started in 1974, based in the Hornsby district, but open to members from across the Sydney North Region.
- Korimul Gang Show – started in 1975, located in Wollongong.
- Central Coast Gang Show – Started in 1986. Located at North Gosford about 1 hour north of Sydney.

== See also ==
- The Barn Scout Hall, Mosman
