= Asia-Pacific Scout Jamboree =

Scouting jamboree

The Asia-Pacific Scout Region of the World Organization of the Scout Movement has run or sponsored region-wide Asia-Pacific Scout Jamborees in its member countries, originally known as Pan-Pacific Jamborees.

== List of Pan-Pacific Scout Jamborees ==
- 1934-35 - Pan-Pacific (1st Australian) Jamboree - Frankston, Victoria - attended by Baden-Powell - 27 December 1934 to 13 January 1935.
- 1948-49 - Pan-Pacific (3rd Australian) Jamboree - Yarra Brae, Wonga Park, Victoria - 29 December 1948 to 9 January 1949.
- 1952-53 - Pan-Pacific (4th Australian) Scout Jamboree - Greystanes, New South Wales - 29 December 1952 and 9 January 1953.
- 1955-56 - Pan-Pacific (5th Australian) Jamboree - Clifford Park, Victoria - Mud Larks "Mudboree".
- 1958-59 - 3rd Pan-Pacific (2nd New Zealand) Jamboree - Cornwall Park, Auckland - 3 to 10 January 1959 - New Zealand Scout Jamboree

== List of Asia-Pacific Scout Jamborees ==
Number	Host	Place	Time	Other event	References
1	Philippines	Mount Makiling, Los Baños, Laguna	28 December 1973–4 January 1974	Philippines Golden Jubilee Jamboree	
2	Iran	Nishapur	1977	Used as preparation for the scheduled 15th World Scout Jamboree	
3	New Zealand	Oamaru	4 January 1978–11 January 1978	8th New Zealand Jamboree / Theme: New Horizons	
4	Australia	Perry Lakes Reserve, Perth, Western Australia	29 December 1979–7 January 1980	12th Australian Jamboree	
5	Bangladesh	Mouchak, Gazipur, Dhaka Division	30 December 1980–6 January 1981	2nd Bangladesh Scout Jamboree	
6	Indonesia	Cibubur, Jakarta	18 June 1981–25 June 1981	6th Gerakan Pramuka Scout Jamboree	
7	Malaysia	Kota Bharu, Kelantan	1982	5th Malaysian Scout Jamboree	
8	South Korea	Muju, Jeollabuk-do	1982	6th Korean National Jamboree	
9	Thailand	Vajiravudh National Scout Camp, Chonburi	November 1985	11th Thailand Jamboree	
10	India	Hyderabad	1987	11th Indian National Jamboree	
11	New Zealand	Mystery Creek, Hamilton	3 January 1990–11 January 1990	12th New Zealand Jamboree	
12	Philippines	Mount Makiling, Los Baños, Laguna	1991	9th Philippines National Jamboree	
13	Australia	Ballarat, Victoria	1992	16th Australian Jamboree	
14	Bangladesh	Mouchak, Gazipur, Dhaka Division	5 January 1994–12 January 1994	5th Bangladesh National Scout Jamboree	
15	Australia	Perth, Western Australia	30 December 1994–8 January 1995	17th Australian Jamboree	
16	New Zealand	Kepler Farm, Fiordland	December 1995–January 1996	14th New Zealand Jamboree	
17	South Korea	Mt. Sorak, Kangwon Province	7 August 1996–13 August 1996		
18	Malaysia	Kem Seri Keluang, Besut, Terengganu	1 August 1997–8 August 1997	9th Malaysia Jamboree / Asia Pacific Scout Region 18th	
19	Australia	Ipswich, Queensland	2 January 1998–11 January 1998	18th Australian Jamboree	
20	Republic of China	Neipu, Pingtung	1998	8th National Jamboree (Boy Scouts of China (Taiwan)	
21	South Korea	Kosong, Kangwon Province	7 August 2000–14 August 2000	10th Korea National Jamboree	
22	Australia	Cataract Scout Park, Sydney	3 January 2001–12 January 2001	19th Australian Jamboree	
23	Japan	Maishima Sports Island, Osaka Prefecture	3 August 2002–7 August 2002	13th Nippon Jamboree	
24	South Korea	Mt. Sorak, Kangwon Province	5 August 2004–11 August 2004	11th Korea National Jamboree	
25	Thailand	Had Yao, Sattahip	28 December 2005–3 January 2006	No Other Event, 50th anniversary of Asia Pacific Region	
26	Philippines	Mount Makiling, Los Baños, Laguna	28 December 2009–3 January 2010		
27	South Korea	Suncheon City, Jeolla Province	4 August 2010–9 August 2010	3rd International Patrol	
28	Republic of China	Chengcing Lake, Kaohsiung	11 July 2011–17 July 2011	Scouts of China Centenary and 10th National Jamboree	
29	Sri Lanka	Gam Udawa and Kandalama sites Dambulla, Matale District	1 April 2012–6 April 2012	100 Years of Scouting in Sri Lanka	
30	Japan	Yamaguchi City, Yamaguchi Prefecture	28 July 2013–7 August 2013	16th Nippon Jamboree	
31	Mongolia	Nairamdal	27 July 2017 – 2 August 2017		
32	Bangladesh	NSTC, Mouchak, Gazipur, Dhaka	19 January 2023 – 27 January 2023	32nd Asia Pacific and 11th National Scout Jamboree	
33	Philippines	Camp Kainomayan, Botolan, Zambales	14 December 2025–21 December 2025		
34	Thailand	Vajiravudh National Scout Camp, Chonburi	2029–2029		
