= Jamboree 2011 =

Jamboree 2011 may refer to:

== Scout jamborees ==
- 22nd World Organization of the Scout Movement World Scout Jamboree, Rinkaby, Sweden,
- 3rd World Federation of Independent Scouts World Jamboree, Puebla de Zaragoza, Mexico

== Other ==
- Jamboree in the Hills
