= Baltic Jamboree =

- Status: Active
- Genre: Jamboree
- Frequency: Every four or five years
- Locations: Estonia; Latvia; Lithuania
- Inaugurated: 2006

The Baltic Jamboree is a Scouting jamboree for Scouts of the Baltic states. The hosting of the Baltic Jamboree rotates between the Estonian Scout Association, Latvijas Skautu un Gaidu Centrālā Organizācija and Lietuvos Skautija, members of the World Organization of the Scout Movement.

== History ==
Cooperation between the Scout associations of the Baltic states dates back to the 1930s until the occupation of the Baltic states by the Soviet Union in 1940, which resulted in Scouting being banned. With the fall of communism in the 1990s, Scouting reemerged in Estonia, Latvia and Lithuania and cooperation restarted. In 2005, The Scout and Guide organizations of the Baltic states agreed to strengthen their cooperation by hosting a Baltic Jamboree.

== List of events ==
| Year | Event | Location | Host country | Theme/Name | Dates | Attendance | Countries attended |
|---|---|---|---|---|---|---|---|
| 2006 | 1st Baltic Jamboree | Kuldiga | Latvia | | July 9-16 | 140 | 6 |
| 2010 | 2nd Baltic Jamboree | Telšiai | Lithuania | Amber Way | August 7—15 | 196 | 7 |
| 2015 | 3rd Baltic Jamboree | Tagametsa | Estonia | Ancient Olympic Games | July 14-19 | 600 | 9 |
| 2019 | 4th Baltic Jamboree | Meirāni | Latvia | The Jump | July 7-13 | 650 | 9 |
| 2022 | 5th Baltic Jamboree | Naisiai | Lithuania | Back to the Balts | July 24-31 | 671 | |
| 2026 | 6th Baltic Jamboree | Tagametsa | Estonia | Forest Festival | July 11-17 | 750 | |

== See also ==
- European Scout Jamboree
- World Scout Jamboree
