= Archibald Mosman =

Scottish-born merchant, grazier and whaler

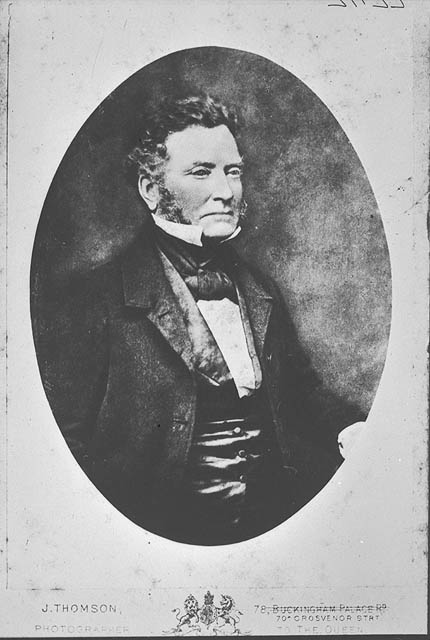
Archibald Mosman

Archibald Mosman (15 October 1799 – 29 January 1863) was a Scottish-born merchant, grazier and whaler in New South Wales, Australia.

== Early life ==
Archibald Mosman was born on 15 October 1799 in Scotland to Hugh Mosman, convener of Lanark and Agnes Kennedy of Auchtyfardle, Lesmahagow near Lanarkshire. He had a twin brother George and an older brother Hugh, a deputy-lieutenant.

== Career and personal life ==
Archibald and George Mosman spent some time growing sugarcane in the West Indies before arriving in Australia aboard the Civilian in 1828. The pair promptly started a business in Sydney, establishing a warehouse on George Street which they used to ship wool to Liverpool. Around 1832, Archibald left the wool business and moved into whaling, operating whaling vessels out of Sirius Cove. These three whalers made 15 whaling voyages from Sydney between 1829 and 1839.

In 1831 Archibald Mosman built The Barn, subsequently acquired by The Scout Association of Australia NSW Branch for use a scouts and girl guides hall. On 2 April 1999 the building was added to the New South Wales State Heritage Register.

Mosman married in 1847 and is believed to have had eleven children. His son Hugh Mosman discovered gold in Charters Towers and was a Member of the Queensland Legislative Council. His daughters Cecilia and Harriette married Arthur Hunter Palmer and Thomas McIlwraith, both Queensland Premiers.

== Death ==
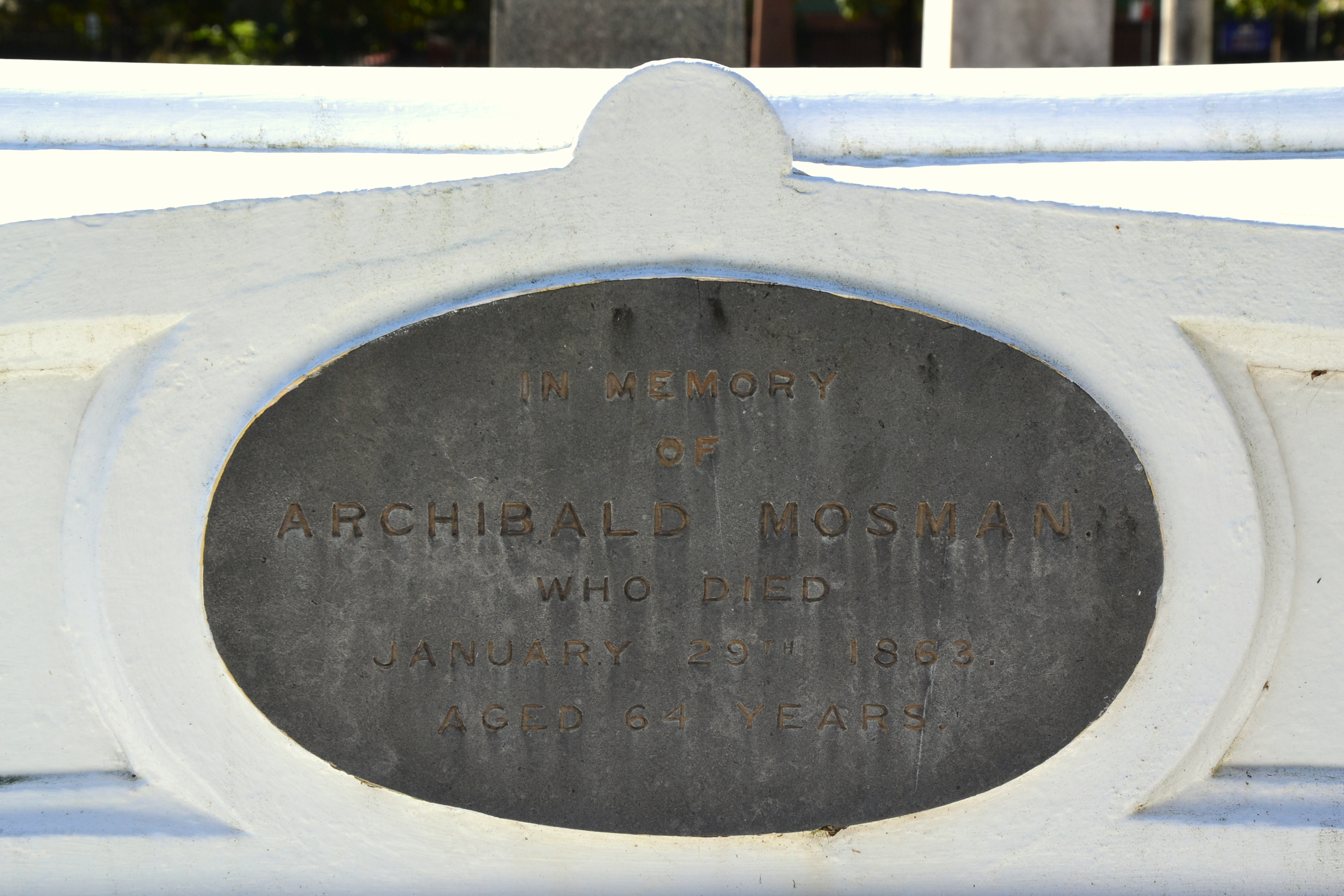
Archibald Mosman's grave

Archibald Mosman died in 1863. He is buried in St Jude's Anglican Church, Randwick cemetery.

== Legacy ==
Today, Sirius Cove is known as Mosman Bay and the land nearby is now the Sydney suburb of Mosman, both named after him.
