= Scouts Australia =

Australian youth organisation

The Scout Association of Australia
- Headquarters: Chatswood, New South Wales
- Country: Australia
- Founded: 1958 incorporated 1967
- Founder: The Boy Scouts Association (United Kingdom)
- Membership: 45,362 Youth Members; 2,656 Young Adult Members; 19,896 Adult Members (2024)
- Chief commissioner: Brendan Watson OAM
- Chief Scout of Australia: Governor-General Sam Mostyn AC
- Website scouts.com.au

| Cubs | Scout | Venturer Scout |

Scouts Australia is a trading name of The Scout Association of Australia, which is the largest organisation in the Scout Movement in Australia, claiming over 50,000 participants in programs for children and young adults from 5 to 25 years of age, including girls since 1971. It was formed in 1958 and incorporated in 1967. It is a member of the World Organization of the Scout Movement.

The organisation's current stated purpose is to "contribute to the development of young people in achieving their full physical, intellectual, emotional, social and spiritual potentials as individuals, as responsible citizens and as members of their local, national and international communities".

Participation in the organisation's programs declined in the late 20th and early 21st centuries, despite opening participation to girls and ever younger children and Australia having a high population growth rate, well above the world average. In 1966, it claimed 280,000 youth participants. According to a 2014 media article, "Scouts Australia is hoping [to] arrest a steady decline in membership. In 1979 it had 114,500 youth members and today [2014] there are 52,000." According to its annual reports, participation decreased from 84,502 in 2,126 groups in 2001 to 63,200 in 1,836 groups in 2005, while in 2012 there were 49,181 children and youth, 2,587 young adult Rovers and 14,113 adult leaders and support roles in 1,486 groups and, in 2022, there were 48,796 children and youths, 2,792 young adult Rovers and 15,147 adult leaders and support roles in 1,321 groups. The organisation has an exceptionally high number of adults compared to its number of youth participants with a ratio of more than one adult for every three youths.

== Structure and governance ==
Scouts Australia is a council which is not elected by, representative of, nor accountable to the Scouts, its adult participants, or Scout groups. The council consists of a majority of members elected by the council itself, office bearers appointed by the council or its national executive committee, state and territory office bearers appointed by the national executive committee, and a smaller number of representatives from state and territory branch councils which are similarly not elected by, representative of or accountable to the Scouts, its adult participants or Scout groups. The council usually meets just once a year. Real control lies with its national executive committee. Its national executive committee sets policy and programs and coordinates its state and territory branches.

The New South Wales, Victorian, and Tasmanian state branches are incorporated under special Acts of the state parliaments. while the Western Australian, South Australian, Queensland, Northern Territory, and Australian Capital Territory branches are incorporated by registration under the ordinary Associations Incorporation Acts. Each state or territory branch maintains its distinct structure, operational methods, and rules. However, all branches operate the same programs for children and young adults under a common uniform and common award scheme structure set by the national executive committee.

The national executive committee appoints the organisation's Chief Scout. In the past, the organisation's positions of chief scouts and state branch chief scouts had usually been held, respectively, by the governor-general or governor of the state. When he was the governor-general from 1989 to 1996, Bill Hayden declined to be the organisation's chief scout. On 15 April 2025 Sam Mostyn, the Governor-General of Australia, was invested in this position.

In 2015, the actor Shane Jacobson was appointed as the organisation's Chief Scout of its Victorian branch. The organisation's position of Chief Scout of its Australian Capital Territory branch was allowed to lapse and has been left vacant. In 1942, Sir Leslie Orme Wilson, the Governor of Queensland, resigned as the Boy Scouts Association's Chief Scout of Queensland because of the failure of the Queensland branch to respond to his call for reforms to its centralisation effort that led to the severance of the Mount Morgan Blue Boy Scouts.

== History ==
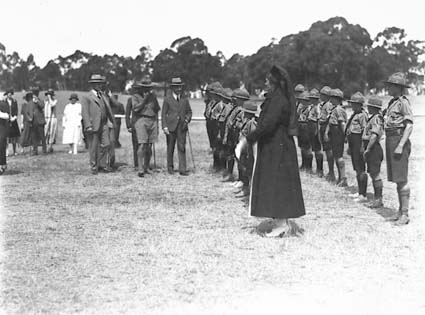
Boy Scouts being reviewed in Canberra in 1927

For the history of Boy Scouts and the Scout Movement in Australia generally, see Scouting and Guiding in Australia.

The organisation was formed in 1958 under the name Australian Boy Scouts Association, as a branch of The Boy Scouts Association of the United Kingdom. Before its formation, branches of The Boy Scouts Association had been formed in each Australian state. Initially, each Australian state branch was directly responsible to the Imperial Headquarters of The Boy Scouts Association in London. In 1922, The Boy Scouts Association formed its Australian Federal Council, consisting of nominees of its Australian state branches, to achieve cooperation and coordination at a national level. The Boy Scouts Association later appointed an Australian commissioner. The Australian Federal Council functioned as a branch of The Boy Scouts Association of the United Kingdom, and the Australian commissioner was appointed by the Imperial Headquarters in London. The Australian Federal Council of The Boy Scouts Association became a member of the International Conference of the Boy Scout Movement in 1953, rather than being represented through The Boy Scouts Association of the United Kingdom. In 1958, when the Australian Boy Scouts Association was formed, it succeeded the Australian Federal Council of The Boy Scouts Association.

In 1967, the organisation was incorporated by royal charter as a branch of The Scout Association of the United Kingdom. Each of the Australian state branches and the Papua New Guinea branch of The Scout Association became branches of the Australian Boy Scouts Association. In 1975, the organisation's Papua New Guinea branch became an independent organisation.

=== Program reviews ===
The Scouts Australia emblem from 1997 to 2019 incorporated the national green-and-gold as well as the Southern Cross motif

In 1969, the organisation began a review of its youth programs under its Design for Tomorrow Committee and implemented its New Design scheme in 1971. The scheme involved a new name, new branding, new uniforms, and new award schemes. It failed to attract an increase in participants and led to considerable disaffection and loss of long-term leaders and supporters and the formation of Australian affiliates of the traditionalist Baden-Powell Scouts' Association while its decline in participation continued.

In 1971, the organisation dropped the word "boy" from its name when it changed its name from the Australian Boy Scouts Association to The Scout Association of Australia. While girls had been part of the Scout Movement and other Scout organisations in Australia since 1908, Scouts Australia and its branches excluded girls until after 1971. It and its branches had utilised women as cubmasters in its Wolf Cubs program from 1920. In 1973, following its Design for Tomorrow report, it began trial admissions of girls to its Rovers and new Venturer programs, and adopted voluntary admission to these programs by Scout groups from 1975. It admitted girls to its cubs and scouts programs in 1988 and to its joeys from its commencement the program in 1990.

Until 1976, it admitted only British Subjects with other nationalities admitted only on special conditions and approval. After 1976, British subjects continued to be automatically admitted while foreign subjects, including residents were still subject to special conditions and approval.

In 1979, following years of disaffection and concerns that the organisation, like its parent organisation in the United Kingdom, would disband Rovers, the organisation formed its national Rover council, composed of Rovers (ages 18 to 25), appointed by each of its seven branch Rover councils. The national Rover council elects an executive to represent Rovers in the organisation's affairs and the chairperson of the National Rover Council is a member of the organisation's national executive committee.

In 1997, the organisation adopted the new trading name Scouts Australia new logo, uniforms, and branding to be more appealing, but participation rates and numbers continued to decline.

In 2001, the organisation formed its National Youth Council in an attempt to engage youth and provide opportunities for youth leadership at its national level. It was composed of just 25 Scouts, Venturers, and Rovers, met face to face twice a year and online throughout the rest of the year. Despite this, youth participation rates and numbers continued to decline. The National Youth Council was disbanded in 2018.

A further program review commenced in 2013. In 2019, at the 25th Australian Scout Jamboree a new program and logo and branding were launched, with the intention of modernising the organisation's brand, and moving its programs more in line with Australian curriculums.

== Religion ==
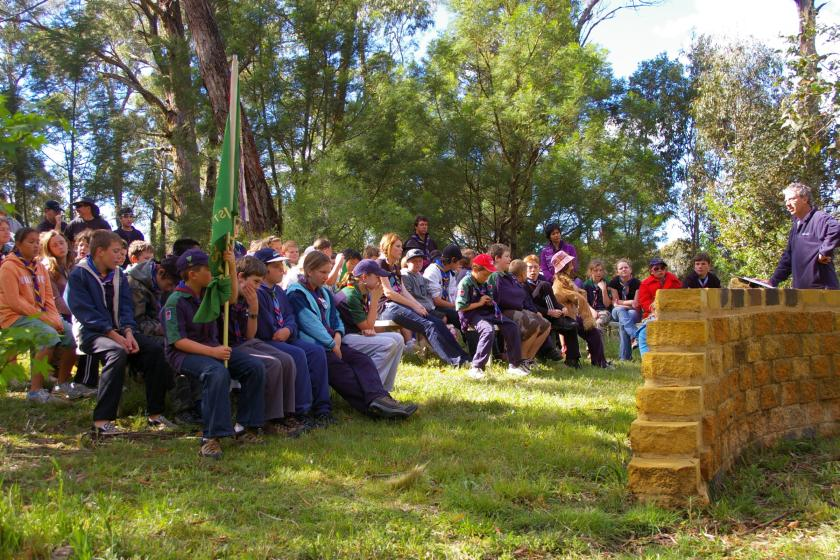
Youth participants at a Scouts' Own, an informal act of worship, at a Scout campsite

The organisation is a non-religious. To enrol, participants are required to make a promise. In 2017, with the launch of "The Adventure Begins", a new promise option allows Scouts to "do my best to be true to my spiritual beliefs", to further open the promise to all religious faiths. The other more established option for the Australian Scout Promise includes the phrase "do my best to do my duty to my God", allowing some flexibility in the interpretation of "my God".

Historically, Scouting in Australia was rooted in Christianity as that was the world view of Scouts founder, Lord Baden-Powell. Although Britain is now a majority non-religious nation Christianity was the dominant faith in both Britain and Australia in Scouting's early days.

More recently, participants have come from many faiths, although the majority of Scout groups promote an interfaith approach to religion. Many Scout groups have been formed within existing communities and specific religious traditions as "sponsored groups", such as Coptic Orthodox, Greek Orthodox, Islamic and Jewish.

== Scout Promise and Law ==
=== Scout Promise ===
There are two versions of the Australian Scout Promise which individuals may choose to select:

Option One
On my honour,
I promise to do my best,
To do my duty to my God and
To the King of Australia,
To help other people,
And to live by the Scout Law.

Option Two
On my honour, I promise
To do my best,
To be true to my spiritual beliefs,
To contribute to my community and our world,
To help other people,
And to live by the Scout Law.

=== Scout Law ===
Be Respectful
Be friendly and considerate.
Care for others and the environment.

Do What is Right
Be trustworthy, honest and fair.
Use resources wisely.

Believe in Myself
Learn from my experiences.
Face challenges with courage.

== Children and youth programs ==
=== Age sections ===
Youth development in the organisation's programs is divided into several age group stages. The age groups encourage movement through the sections as the youth matures. The sections are:

- Joeys (5–7 years): helping to develop a child's sense of personal identity.
- Cubs (8–10 years): aims to develop a sense of adventure and achievement and a chance to grow their character.
- Scouts (11–14 years): promotes leadership and teamwork, as well as an appreciation of the outdoors.
- Venturer Scouts (15–17 years): develops leadership and management skills, as well as an understanding of camping and the environment.
- Rovers (18–25 years): continues to develop leadership skills, as well as placing a strong emphasis on service to the community and other parts of the organisation.

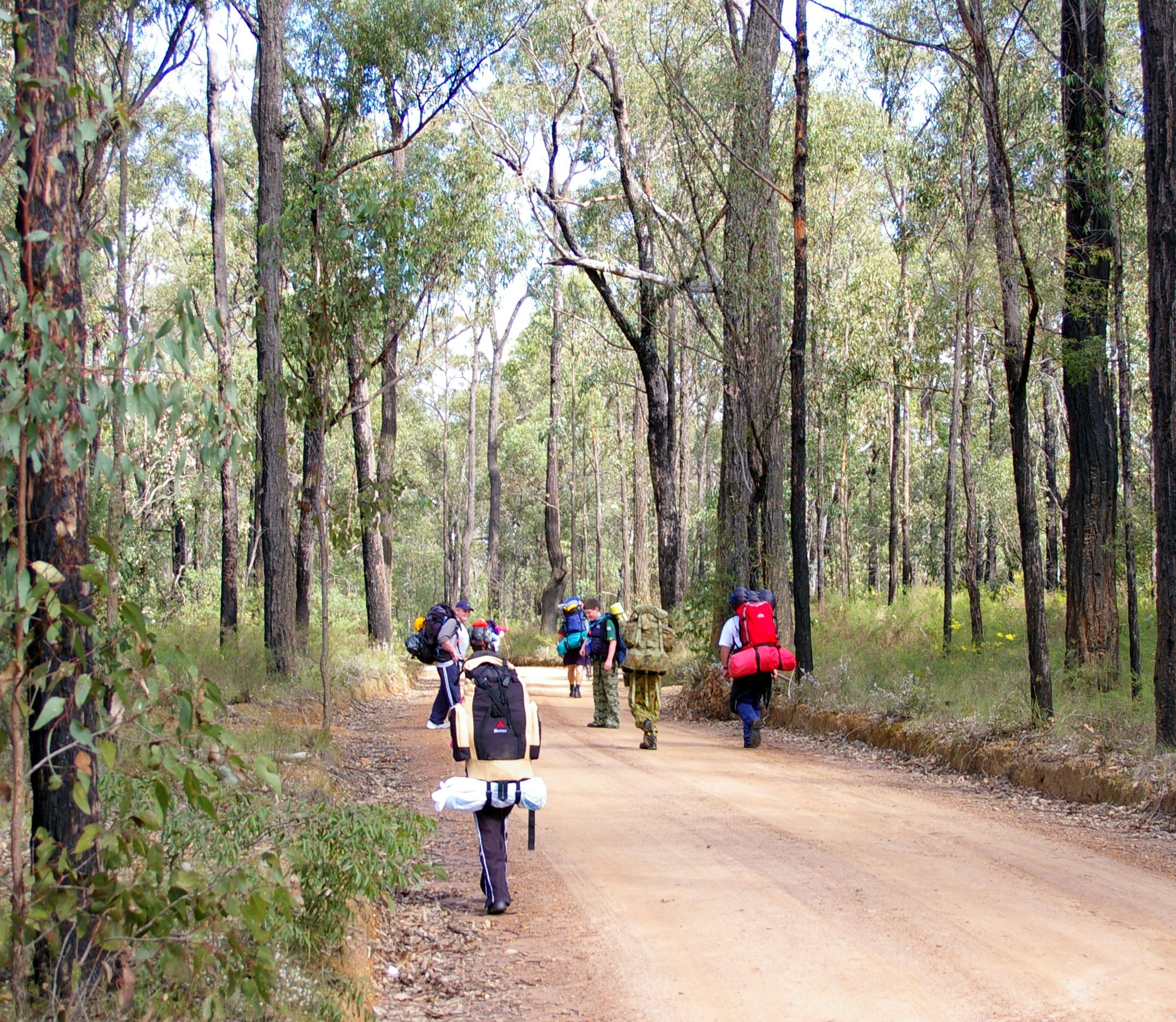
Scouts hiking in the Blue Mountains National Park in New South Wales

=== Uniform ===
The core uniform is a navy blue shirt with the relevant youth section colour across the sleeves and collar, a scarf, and a woggle. The adult leader's shirt is only dark blue.

The section colours are:

- Tan for Joeys
- Yellow for Cubs
- Green for Scouts
- Maroon for Venturers
- Red for Rovers

=== Award scheme ===
The organisation's youth award scheme consists of awards for proficiency in an adventurous activity, participation in major events, recognition of service, gallantry and meritorious service and for the practice of scouting (King's Scout, Baden-Powell Award, etc.).

The peak award for each section is the Joey Promise Award, Grey Wolf Award, Australian Scout Award, King's Scout, and Baden-Powell Scout Award respectively and the badges that are earned from this can be worn on their uniform throughout the rest of their time as a youth member in scouting.

=== Lone Scouts ===
Lone Scout Groups are for youth unable to attend or find a local Scout group. Lones can include people with impairments that inhibit attending regular meetings, people who are constant travellers or go to places at which they are unable to attend a group i.e. boarding school or isolated communities. Lone Scout Groups may hold camps or other gatherings to enable their members to come together but, between such events, deliver programs virtually via internet, radio and post.

=== International connections ===
The organisation operates in the non-sovereign Australian Indian Ocean Territories of:

- Christmas Island
- Cocos (Keeling) Islands

Two Scout troops in Singapore are affiliated with the organisation.

The organisation is a founder member of the Asia-Pacific Region of the World Organization of the Scout Movement. In the field of support and co-operation with other national member organisations of the Asia Pacific region, the organisation has contributed to a number of international friendship and community development-oriented projects. Over the years, it has supported emerging Scout organisations in the South Pacific. A twinning project with Scouts in Bangladesh, known as the "Bangladesh-Australia Child Health" (BACH) project, made a dramatic impact on child health in project villages during its operation from 1986 to 1992. The organisation has a twinning project with the Nepal Scouts known as NATURE Project and involves the reforestation of the Kristi Landslide.

In 1988 the organisation hosted the 16th World Scout Jamboree and the 31st World Scout Conference. Some 15,000 Scouts from 94 countries attended the jamboree at Cataract Scout Park near Sydney. An Australian Scout Jamboree has been held every three years since 1934 except for the years of the Second World War. The Scout Jamboree is the organisation's largest event but an Australian Rover Moot and an Australian Venture are also held every three years.

== Adult training and awards ==
Training institute

In 1996 the organisation became a registered training organisation (RTO), trading as the Scouts Australia Institute of Training (SAIT). It's adult leader training program now leads adults and Rovers to a Certificate III in Business and a Certificate IV in Leadership and Management, as well as the Woodbadge qualification. Woodbadge Leaders and Rovers can then undertake the Diploma of Leadership and Management qualification through SAIT.

In 2011, the institute added a number of the SIS10 qualifications to its scope, and changes are occurring in the individual state branches to allow Adventurous Activity Leader training to also lead to the Certificate IV in Outdoor Recreation. Adventurous Activities Leaders are leaders who specialise in the running of advanced adventurous activities, such as abseiling, rock climbing, scuba diving and mountain biking, as opposed to the everyday running of a Scout group and more basic activities such as camping and hiking.

Adult Recognition Awards

Adult Recognition Awards (formerly Good Service Awards) are presented each year by the organisation's Chief Scout of each branch and are presented for service over and above what is expected of someone who is simply carrying out the duties of their position. These awards can be nominated by anyone affiliated with the organisation.

Adult Recognition Awards for adult leaders and supporters
| Award | Minimum Time in Service | Description |
|---|---|---|
| Special Service Award | 12 months | Bronze Medallion depicting the logo on a white ribbon Badge: White knot on blue background |
| Meritorious Service Award | 6 years | Silver Medallion depicting the logo on a yellow ribbon Badge: Yellow knot on blue background |
| Silver Wattle | 10 years | Silver medallion depicting a wattle on a green ribbon Badge: Green knot on blue background |
| Silver Koala | 14 years | Silver medallion depicting a koala on an orange ribbon Badge: orange knot on blue background |
| Silver Emu | 4–5 years since receiving Silver Koala | Silver Medallion depicting an emu on a purple ribbon Badge: Purple knot on blue background |
| Silver Kangaroo | Not specified Also presented to members of other WOSM organisations | Silver medallion depicting a kangaroo on a green and gold ribbon Badge: Gold knot on blue background |

Adult Recognition Awards for lay supporters
| Award | Minimum Time in Service | Description |
|---|---|---|
| Special Service Award | 12 months | Bronze Medallion depicting the logo on a white ribbon Badge: White knot on blue background |
| Meritorious Service Award | 6 years | Silver Medallion depicting the logo on a yellow ribbon Badge: Yellow knot on blue background |
| Outstanding Service Award | Not specified | Silver medallion on a green ribbon |
| Distinguished Service Award | Not specified | Silver medallion on an orange ribbon |
| National President's Award | Not specified Also presented to members of other WOSM organisations | Silver medallion on a red ribbon |

Adult Recognition Award for service to the Rover Section
| Award | Minimum Time in Service | Description |
|---|---|---|
| Rover Service Award | 5 years service to the Rover Section by a Rover; 10 years service to the Rover Section by an Adult participant/leader / supporter | Silver and red medallion on a red and white ribbon Badge: Red and White knot on blue background |

== Awards for gallantry and meritorious conduct ==
Awards for Gallantry are made by the organisation's Chief Scout of Australia for actions involving risk, for example for saving someone from a burning building to individual participants or groups.

Awards for Gallantry of Scouts Australia
| Award | For | Description |
|---|---|---|
| Certificate of Gallantry | Actions involving limited risk | Certificate; Badge: Blue and White knot on blue background |
| Gilt Cross | Gallantry involving limited risk | A Gilt Cross on a Red and Blue ribbon Badge: Blue and Red knot on blue background |
| Silver Cross | Gallantry involving considerable risk | A Silver Cross on a Blue ribbon Badge: Blue knot on blue background |
| Bronze Cross | Special heroism or extreme risk | A Bronze Cross on Red ribbon Badge: Red knot on blue background |

Awards for meritorious conduct are awarded for actions that may not have involved risking of life but still display courage, endurance, initiative, or devotion to duty, often under suffering. As with Awards for Gallantry, these awards are made by the organisation's Chief Scout of Australia to individuals or groups depending on the circumstances.

Awards for Meritorious Service of Scouts Australia
| Award | For | Description |
|---|---|---|
| Certificate of Meritorious Conduct | Actions involving limited risk | Certificate; Badge: Green and Blue knot on blue background |
| Medal for Meritorious Conduct | Gallantry involving limited risk | A medallion on a green ribbon with a vertical red stripe Badge: Green and Red knot on blue background |

== Sexual abuse cases ==
Scouts Australia was called before the Royal Commission into Institutional Responses to Child Sexual Abuse for its failures in handling complaints against its leaders.

In 2014, Darryl Rubiolo, a former Scout Association of Australia leader, publicity officer, leader trainer, St. George Area Commissioner and member of the New South Wales state branch council, was convicted of serial child sex offences against three boys aged 9, 13 and 14, between 1975 and 1987 while he was an official of the Scout Association of Australia. Rubiolo was sentenced to two-and-a-half years in prison with a non-parole period of one year.

In 2012, Steven Larkins, a former leader in New South Wales, was imprisoned for offences he had committed 15 years earlier.

In February 2000, Roderick Albert Joseph Corrie, a former NSW Branch Commissioner and scout leader of nearly thirty-two years was convicted of child sexual offences. "Corrie, one of the most senior and highly decorated Scouts in NSW, was jailed for seven years in February 2000 after pleading guilty in the District Court to eight most serious of 77 charges of sexually abusing children as young as 11, including rape and buggery, occurring 1969–1995. Two years earlier, Corrie had been convicted of eight charges of "aggravated indecent assault" and placed on a bond, given counselling and 70 hours of community service." The head of Scouts Australia, "Dr. Bruce Munro, apologised to the families of those abused after The Sydney Morning Herald obtained a copy of a 14-page report written by a senior Scout leader in 1981 that detailed serious allegations of Corrie abusing four boys, one aged 12 at the time. Munro admitted that those allegations were not properly investigated or referred to the police and that although Corrie was initially suspended, he was then simply allowed to transfer as a leader to a North Shore Scout group. Even after police began investigating Corrie in 1994, he was allowed to continue having contact with, and sexually abusing, scouts until at least May 1995."

Mark Geoffrey Fisher, the scoutmaster at 1st Hunters Hill troop in New South Wales from 1969 to 1988, pleaded guilty to charges of 35 sex offences involving eight boys aged between 11 and 15 between 1971 and 1988.

In 2017, former scout leader Neville Budge was convicted of sexually abusing eight young boys between the years of 1995 and 2002, whilst working as a Scout leader in the Belmont and Geelong district, Victoria. The court referred to his manipulative and predatory actions, labelling his crimes as being "simply abhorrent".

In 2017, former scout leader Chris Edmondson was convicted of the sexual abuse of three young boys between 1975 and 1978 in Warrandyte. On one occasion he sexually abused a young boy for having not known a test answer. Edmondson was jailed in Queensland in 2006, released in 2012, then jailed in Victoria in 2015 again, had his sentence extended in 2016 and would have been eligible for parole in January 2019. The outcome of the proceedings is unclear to date.

Former scout leader Kim Richard Harvey was jailed for the sexual abuse of 15 teenage boys in Melbourne's South Eastern suburbs between the years of 1974 and 1989. Harvey's behaviour posed a uniquely disturbing pattern, whereby premeditated grooming was a natural part of his 'game', often plying his victims with alcohol, lollies, and pornography. Harvey's crimes were not just isolated to local scout halls but continued throughout various camping trips, and activities in his role as a leader with Scouts Victoria.

Since then, Scouts Australia put child safety training and procedures in place to try to protect the children under their care.

== See also ==
- Baden-Powell Guild (Australia)
- Clement Roy Nichols
- Gang Show
- Girl Guides Australia
- King's Scout Award
- The Barn Scout Hall, Mosman
