= The Barn Scout Hall =

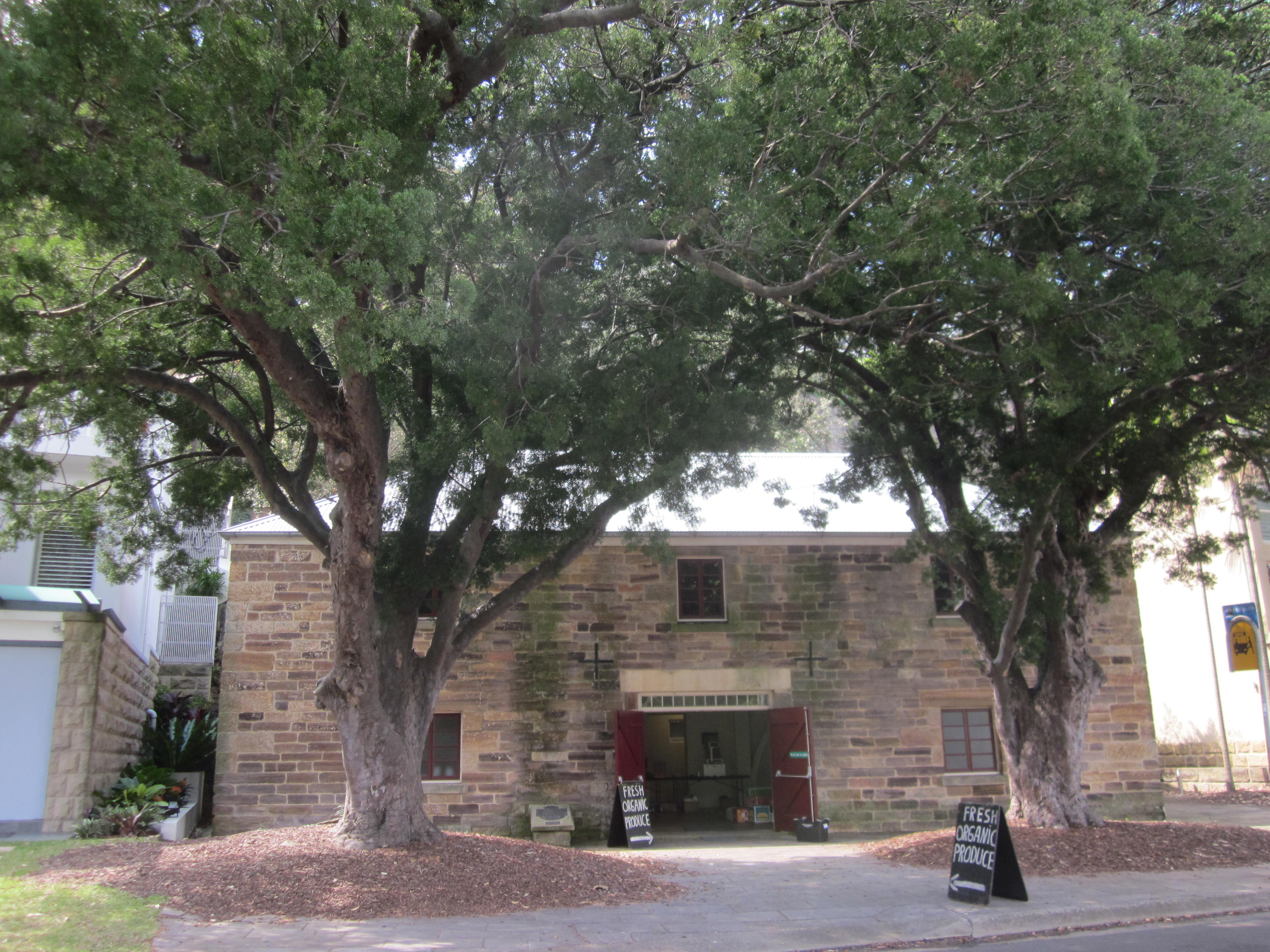
- The Barn Scout Hall, 3a Avenue Road, Mosman, New South Wales

- Location within Sydney Location within Australia
- 33°50′14″S 151°14′00″E
- Location: 3a Avenue Road, Mosman, Municipality of Mosman, New South Wales, Australia

History
- Built: 1831
- Built for: Archibald Mosman

Site notes
- Architectural style: Colonial Georgian
- Owner: 1st Mosman Scout Troop, held in trust by The Scout Association of Australia New South Wales Branch

New South Wales Heritage Register
- Official name: The Barn Scout Hall; Whaling Station
- Type: State heritage (built)
- Designated: 2 April 1999
- Reference no.: 188
- Type: Girl Guide / Scout Hall
- Category: Community Facilities
- Builders: Archibald Mosman

The Barn Scout Hall is a heritage-listed former whaling boat servicing facility and now Scout hall and community facility at 3a Avenue Road, Mosman in the Mosman Council local government area of New South Wales, Australia. It was built by Archibald Mosman. It is also known as Whaling Station. In 1925, the property was purchased by parents for the 1st Mosman Scouts, which was founded in 1908. It was added to the New South Wales State Heritage Register on 2 April 1999.

== History ==
Mosman Bay had been explored by Captain John Hunter as early as 1789. He mentions the bay as Careening Cove, and Charles Grimes, an early surveyor, notes it as such on his map of 1796, apparently because HMS Sirius was careened in the bay in 1789. In following years the bay's name varied. A survey by Roe in 1822 marked it as Careening Cove, but a map by Cross in 1825 called it Sirius Cove. A grant made in the area was called "land at Great Sirius Cove" while the parish map of 1871 registers the name Great and Little Sirius Cove. It became a popular picnic area in the 1920s. Careening Cove now applies to the inlet east of Kirribilli.

The Barn was erected by Archibald Mosman in 1831 as a storehouse for his whaling business. Called "The Barn" in earlier times, it is thought to be the oldest stone building surviving in the lower North Shore and is claimed to be "the last maritime industrial structure remaining in Sydney dating from the early Colonial period".

Archibald Mosman (1799-1863) and his twin brother George arrived in Sydney in 1828. In 1831 they moved to a 4-acre grant in this area and became engaged in the shipping and whaling industries, using as headquarters a deep, sheltered bay on the north side of the harbour, which became known as Mosman's Bay. Brother George soon took up grazing, but Archibald continued with his whaling activities.

It was part of Mosman's grand scheme for centralising whaling ship servicing. The station was made up of a stone wharf and five strong stone buildings, including the barn, a large storehouse and quarters for the ships' officers and crew.

The area is also significant for 'Tarpot's Cave' an Aboriginal heritage- listed cave, directly behind the Barn in the middle of the cliff face.

By 1838 when Mosman owned 44 hectares (108 acres) along the local waterfront, he decided to sell his whaling interests and retire to a country property near Glen Innes. On his death in Randwick in 1863 he was buried at St. Jude's cemetery, Randwick, in a grave now maintained by Mosman Council. The Barn subsequently had a range of uses, including being the site of the first meeting that led to the formation of the Mosman Municipal Council, a roller skating rink and other uses.

In 1925, the Barn was saved from property developers when it was purchased by parents for the 1st Mosman Scout Troop, which was founded in 1908 and was one of earliest formed Scout organisations in Australia and the world. The property was later vested, in trust, in The Boy Scouts Association New South Branch. The Barn was used as the headquarters of the 1st Mosman Scouts. In 2002, wild weather severely damaged its roof. The entire site was then declared dangerous, due to mud and rock slides from an unstable cliff behind the Barn and the risk of a block of home units coming down on top, resulting in the temporary relocation of the scouts. Recognising the historic significance of their Scout Hall, the Scout group embarked on a successful six-year campaign to restore and conserve the Barn, beginning with a five-year fundraising campaign that raised almost one million dollars. Godden Mackay Logan heritage consultants sponsored the project, preparing a conservation management plan to enable the Scouts to apply for heritage funding. After stabilising the cliff face and restoring the building, the Scouts returned home to the Barn.

The Barn is now viewed by the local community as the heart of Mosman, a valued community facility and home to the resident Scout group.

== Description ==
A two-storey building with a symmetrical front addressing Avenue Road. It has walls of narrow-coursed squared sandstone rubble with more substantial quoin stones, some window dressings and lintels, and basework. There is evidence in the hen-pecked sandstone block finish of former lime-wash finish.

The lintel over the wide main doorway appears to be concrete and there is a metal-barred toplight above the transom of the timber double doors. The gabled roof is covered with slates. Windows are fairly small and have casement sashes.

There is a narrow rear entrance on the eastern (rear) side, where the site has been cut into the rockface, and here there is also a narrow skillion appendage with a brick chimney, and a concrete slab.

Beside the main doors there is a stone base bearing a plaque dedicated in 1981, on which the significance of the building is briefly set out.

In front of the building are rare, mature African yellow wood/plum pine trees (Afrocarpus falcatus (syn. Nageia falcata)) which are fine old trees in their own right. These do, by their size and density of canopy, detract visually from an appreciation of Mosman's oldest building.

=== Condition ===
As at 8 March 2004, simplified Colonial Georgian style.

=== Modifications and dates ===
Pre 1831: The area is also significant for 'Tarpot's Cave' an Aboriginal heritage- listed cave, directly behind the Barn in the middle of the cliff face.

- 1831 erected as a storehouse, part of Mosman's grand scheme for centralising whaling ship servicing. The station was made up of a stone wharf and five strong stone buildings, including the barn, a large storehouse and quarters for the ships' officers and crew. Only one, the barn, remains today.
- 1925 purchased by parents for use by the 1st Mosman Scout Troop (formed 1908) as their headquarters
- 2002 wild weather severely damaged its roof. The entire site was then declared dangerous due to mud and rock slides from the nearby cliff, resulting in the temporary removal of the scout group.
- 2007-8: restored, cliff face stabilised, reopened to community use and Scout group.

== Heritage listing ==
Associated with Archibald Mosman, after whom the suburb was named, "The Barn" is believed to be the oldest stone building surviving in the lower North Shore and Sydney's only remaining maritime industrial structure dating from the early Colonial period.

The Barn Scout Hall was listed on the New South Wales State Heritage Register on 2 April 1999.

== See also ==
- Scouts Australia
