= International Cultural Jamboree =

Indian scouting jamboree

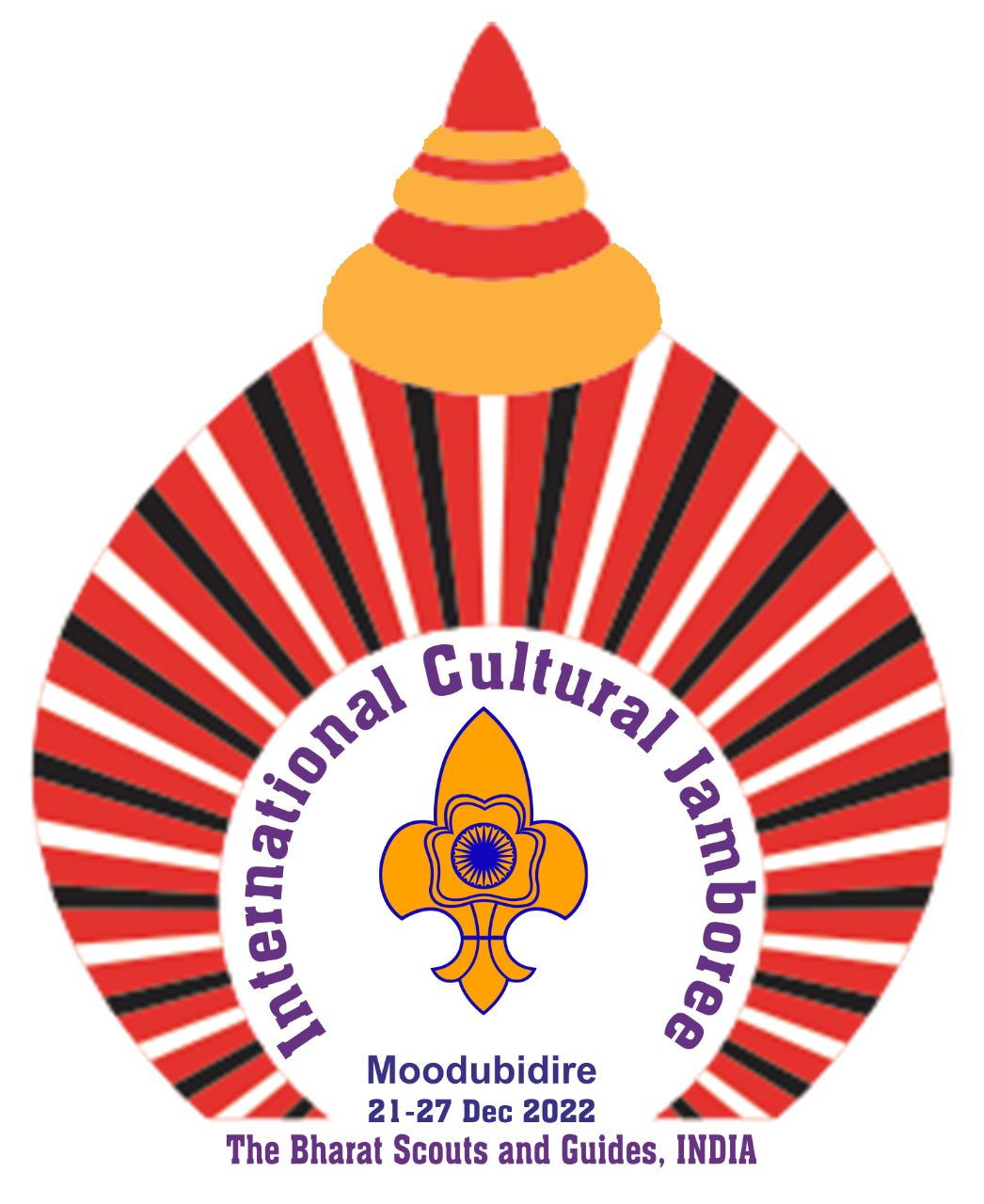
- Location: Moodabidri
- Country: India
- Coordinates: 13°02′50″N 74°59′50.2″E
- Date: 21–27 December 2022
- Affiliation: World Organization of the Scout Movement
- Website: http://internationalculturaljamboree.org

International Cultural Jamboree was held on 21–27 December 2022 at Alva's Education Foundation Moodabidri, Dakshina Kannada, Karnataka State, an International Cultural Jamboree is the part of the Scout Movement, the theme of this Jamboree is Culture for Youth Solidarity, typically attended by fifty thousands of Scout and Guide, Rovers and Rangers between the age of 12 to 22 years from 17 countries.

The purpose of the International Cultural Jamboree is to encourage youth to live in harmony and with one another. Introducing them to numerous concepts and ideals from various cultures, traditions, and ways of life, helps young people acquire knowledge and abilities. Additionally, it tries to increase young people's tolerance for social and cultural differences.

== Activities ==
According to the Jamboree schedules, there will be a tonne of cultural activities at the Jamboree that Scouts and Guides can enjoy. The student's experiences in this jamboree is like art exhibitions, book exhibitions, science exhibitions, agriculture exhibitions, horticulture shows, food exhibitions, traditional games, yoga and meditation, day hikes, all faith valley, the jungle trail, challenge valley and fun bases, scout exhibitions, and a lot more.

=== Forest experience ===
A forest is being established on an area of land that is around 10 acres. The participants will experience the tribal culture, hear bird chirps, and see miniature waterfalls while strolling through the forest named after scientist L. C. Soans.
