= Clement Roy Nichols =

Australian scout official

- Known for: Scout official

Clement Roy Nichols, CMG, OBE, of Kew, Victoria, was a Scout official of the Australian Boy Scouts Association.

Nichols was a member of the World Organization of the Scout Movement (WOSM) committee from 1959 to 1965 and again from 1967 to 1973.

WOSM awarded Nichols its Bronze Wolf Award for exceptional services to world Scouting, in 1965. He was made a Companion of the Order of St Michael and St George (CMG) in the 1970 New Year Honours, for services to the Australian Boy Scouts Association.
