= Lewis Clifford, 12th Baron Clifford of Chudleigh =

Peer (1889–1964)

Lewis Joseph Hugh Clifford, 12th Baron Clifford of Chudleigh (7 February 1889 – 27 August 1964) was an Australian/British peer. He inherited his title from his older brother, Charles Oswald Hugh Clifford, who died without male issue on 1 February 1962. As he died a little over two years later, he never spoke in the House of Lords.

His younger brother was the colonial administrator, Sir Bede Clifford.

Clifford was born in New Zealand and educated at Xavier College in Melbourne, Australia. Clifford's ancestors were recusants who cherished the relics of saints and martyrs. Lewis Clifford donated a relic of Saint Edmund of Abingdon, which had been rescued from Pontigny Abbey in France in 1849, to Sacred Heart Church in Croydon in Melbourne. Clifford lived at Yarra Brae in Wonga Park in Victoria which was the site of the Australia's first Pan-Pacific Scout Jamboree in 1948. He retired to the United Kingdom.

== Family and children ==
He married Amy Webster and they had three children:

1. Hon. Rosamund Ann Clifford
2. Colonel Lewis Hugh Clifford, 13th Baron Clifford of Chudleigh
3. Hon. Mary Clifford

Following his first wife's death on 15 January 1926, Clifford married Mary Elizabeth Knox, younger daughter of Sir Adrian Knox who served as the second Chief Justice of the High Court of Australia.
