= Australian Venture =

- Country: Australia
- Inaugurated: 1965-66
- Most recent: 2024

The Australian Venture is an event for Australian Venturer Scouts. It is their equivalent of a Jamboree, but for Venturers there is a lot more freedom and latitude in what they do. There is a number of on site activities and also an off site expedition, normally totaling about 12 days long. In 2021, Scouts Australia announced that Ventures would no longer be organised nationally. The last Australian Venturer Scout Event was at Lardner Park, Victoria, 2024. The theme for this Venture was "Go Places". The event which spanned two weeks was run in January 2024 with over 1000 people from around Australia and New Zealand. The event included over 20 expeditions around Australia, Fiji and New Zealand, making it the largest Venturer Scout Event in over 20 years.

== Past Ventures ==
- 1965-66 - National Senior Scout Venture, Perth, Western Australia (presumably the 1st National Venture).
- 1969-70 - 2nd Australian Venture, Nunawading, Victoria.
- 1972-73 - 3rd Australian Venture, BP Park, Samford, Queensland.
- 1975-76 - 4th Australian Venture, Camp Cottermouth, Canberra, Australian Capital Territory.
- 1978-79 - 5th Australian Venture, Victoria Park, South Australia.
- 1981-82 - 6th Australian Venture, Nunawading, Victoria.
- 1985 – 7th Australian Venture, VentureWest, Sorrento, Western Australia.
- 1991 – 8th Australian Venture, AV8, Tasmania.
- 1994 – 9th Australian Venture, 9AV, Karingal, Mt. Cotton, Queensland.
- 1997 – 10th Australian Venture, Mega 10, Adelaide Showgrounds, Wayville and Woodhouse Scout Centre, Piccadilly, South Australia.
- 2000 – 11th Australian Venture, Venture 2000, Anglesea, Victoria.
- 2003 – 12th Australian Venture, Extreme Venture, Camp Cottermouth, Australian Capital Territory.
- 2006 – 13th Australian Venture, AV06, Cataract Park, Sydney, New South Wales.
- 2009 - 14th Australian Venture, Escape, Fairbridge Village, Pinjarra, Western Australia.
- 2012 - 15th Australian Venture, Wild Dayz, Tasmania.
- 2015 - 16th Australian Venture, Heaps Good, Woodhouse Scout Centre, Piccadilly, South Australia.
- 2018 - 17th Australian Venture, Get Set, Camp Warrawee, Brisbane, Queensland.
- 2024 - Venture24, Lardner Park, Victoria

Ventures have been cancelled due to other events such as the COVID-19 pandemic which saw Oz Venture 2021, Sydney, New South Wales cancelled.

== See also ==
- Venture Scout
- Venturing (Boy Scouts of America)
- Australian Scout Jamboree
