= Jamboree =

Festive event

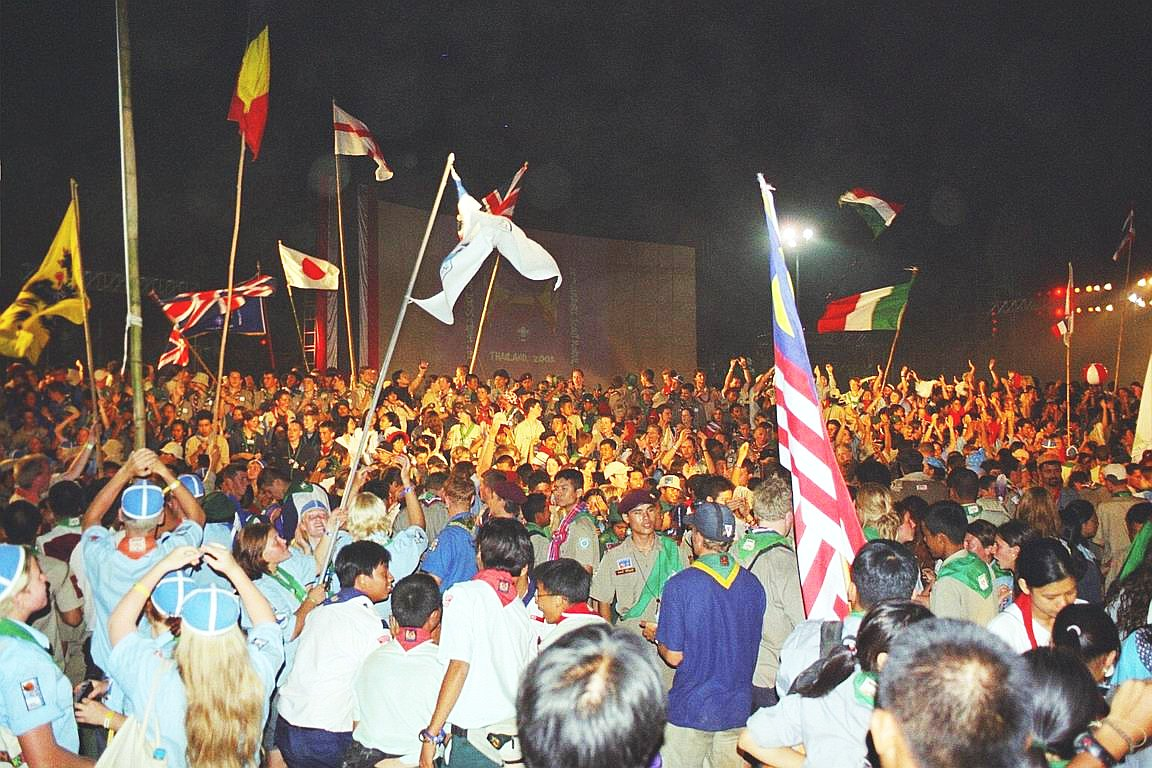
Closing ceremony of the 20th World Scout Jamboree, held in Thailand in 2002/2003

A jamboree is any large, lively, often noisy gathering or festive celebration and is applied to music jamborees, sales jamborees and motor racing jamborees. The term has been adopted for large gatherings of Scouts and Girl Guides.

== Etymology ==
The Oxford English Dictionary (OED) identifies the term Jamboree as coming from American slang, identifying a use in the New York Herald in 1868 and in Irish writing later in the 19th century. The Canadian Oxford Dictionary indicates the etymology of the term is "19th century, origin unknown". Some linguists believe it is a playful blend of "jabber" and "shivaree," a French folk tradition involving noisy, mocking celebrations.

Early 20th century use of the term refer to "a lavish or boisterous celebration or party". Poet Robert W. Service used the term in a poem, Athabaska Dick, published in 1912: "They are all a-glee for the jamboree, and they make the Landing ring". Lucy Maud Montgomery used the term three times in 1915 in Anne of the Island, a book set in the 1880s. For example, "There was quite a bewildering succession of drives, dances, picnics and boating parties, all expressively lumped together by Phil under the head of 'jamborees'."

Other claimed possible origins for the term range from Hindi to the Swahili word for hello, Jambo!, to Native American languages.

The word jamboree in English is used as a borrowed foreign word, with the ending -ree. The word jamboree is both a noun and a transitive verb, with a direct action of the root word jambo. For example, an attendee of a jambo is a jamboree.

== Scout Jamborees ==
The term jamboree was adopted for large national and international gatherings of Scouts and/or Girl Guides. There are also national and continental jamborees held around the world with varying frequency. Many of these events will invite and attract Scouts from overseas.

The first International Jamboree of Scouts (retrospectively called the 1st International Jamboree and, later still, the 1st World Jamboree) was held in 1920 in the United Kingdom. Many, at this first "jamboree" did not fully capture the spirit of this then-new concept. At the first World Jamboree at Olympia, London, in 1920, Robert Baden-Powell said:

"People give different meanings for this word, but from this year on, jamboree will take a specific meaning. It will be associated to the largest gathering of youth that ever took place."

Since then, there have been twenty-four other Scout World Jamborees, hosted in various countries, generally every four years. The 26th World Jamboree is to be held in Poland in 2027.

The average Scout Life of a boy is a comparatively short one, and it is good for each generation of Scouts to see at least one big rally, since it enables the boy to realize his membership of a really great brotherhood, and at the same time brings him into personal acquaintance with brother Scouts of other districts and other countries.

— Robert Baden-Powell, (September 1932)

Within the Scout Movement, it is often mistakenly believed that the word jamboree was coined by Baden-Powell but, as indicated above, the word jamboree was in prior use. Baden-Powell was once asked why he chose "jamboree" as the name for large gatherings of Boy Scouts. He replied, "What else would you call it?" The Celtic mythologist, Robert Graves suggested, in 1954, that Baden-Powell might have known the word through his regiment's Irish links, rather than from U.S. slang.

=== International ===
- International Jamborees, now referred to as World Scout Jamborees are gathering of Scouts from all over the world under the World Organization of the Scout Movement. Attendance is 30–40,000.
- Jamboree on the Air (JOTA) – an amateur radio event linking Scouts across the world
- World Scout Jamboree on the Internet (JOTI)
- Jamboree on the Trail (JOTT) is an international day of hiking
- Africa Scout Jamboree
- Arab Scout Jamboree
- Asia-Pacific Scout Jamboree
- Caribbean Scout Jamboree, a gathering of Scouts from the Caribbean
- Central European Jamboree, a gathering of Scouts from Central Europe
- European Scout Jamboree, a gathering of Scouts from all over Europe
- Interamerican Scout Jamboree, a gathering of Scouts from the Interamerican Scout Region
- Baltic Jamboree, a gathering of Scouts and Guides from Lithuania, Latvia and Estonia together with international guests from other countries
- Essex International Jamboree, a gathering of 7,000–9,000 Scouts and Guides from all over the world, held since 1927
- World Federation of Independent Scouts World Jamboree, a gathering of Scouts of the World Federation of Independent Scouts
- Jamboree 2008 (Northumberland), a celebration of the 1908 Humshaugh camp
- Homenetmen General Jamboree, a gathering of Scouts of the Homenetmen
- International Cultural Jamboree

=== National ===
- National Scout jamboree, Scouting America
- Canadian Scout Jamboree, a gathering of Scouts from Canada
- Lithuanian National Jamboree, a gathering of Scouts from Lithuania, held every five years
- Australian Scout Jamboree, a gathering of Scouts from Australia and the Asia-Pacific Region
- Australian Girl Guide Jamboree, a gathering of Girl Guides from around Australia and the world.
- Nippon Jamboree, a gathering of Scouts from Japan
- Nawaka, a gathering of Sea Scouts in the Netherlands
- Irish Scout Jamborees
- New Zealand Scout Jamboree
- Girl Scout Senior Roundup
- "Gathering of Scouts and Guides in India". Archived from the original on 2011-12-11.

Olave Baden-Powell coined the term jamborese to refer to the lingua franca used between Scouts of different languages and cultural habits, that develops when diverse Scouts meet, that fosters friendship and understanding between Scouts of the world. Sometimes the word "jamborette" is used to denote smaller, either local or international, gatherings.

=== Other Scout gatherings ===
Other large gatherings are held by Scout organizations, geared towards a particular age groups. Examples of these large gatherings include:

- Moot – a camp or a gathering of Rovers
- Venture – a gathering of young people in the Venture (Senior Scout) section
- Indaba – a camp or a gathering of Adult Scout leaders
- Agoonoree – a camp of Scouts with special needs
- COMDECA – acronym for Community Development Camp, a large gathering of young people, implementing community development projects
- camporee - a local or regional gathering of Scout units for a period of camping and common activities. Similar to a camporee, a jamboree occurs less often and draws units from the entire nation or world.

== See also ==
- Agoonoree
- Camporee
- EuroJam
- Indaba
- World Camp (Guiding)
