= Scouts (Scouts Australia) =

Scouts Australia
- Age range: 11–15
- Country: Australia
- Founded: 1908
- Founder: Lord Baden Powell
Previous; Cub Scouts	Next; Venturer Scouts
- Website; Scouts

Scouts is the section of Scouts Australia for boys and girls aged 11 to 14 (inclusive). The Scout section follows after Cub Scouts and is before Venturer Scouts. Scouts wear a uniform shirt with navy blue panels, and green shoulders.

Their motto is now "Explore the Unknown".

== Patrol organisation ==
The Scout Unit is usually composed of several adult leaders, and several patrols of approximately six children. The leader of a patrol is called a Patrol Leader, an older scout in the unit. Second in command of a patrol is an Assistant Patrol Leader. There may also be a Unit Leader, an older, more experienced member who is not tied to a patrol, but oversees the entire unit and supports the Patrol Leaders. Each week the patrols take turns to be in charge of some of the unit's activities, such as selecting some of the games to play, and running activities. Each patrol wears a distinctive colour band on their scarf, choosing from red, yellow, green, orange, blue, black, white, grey, tan, and purple.

=== Unit councils ===
The Unit Council is an informal meeting of Leaders, Unit Leader and the Patrol Leaders, and often Assistant Patrol Leaders (although any member of the patrol can be invited), to discuss things such as schedules for the following term, what activities or camp were liked or disliked during the term, and badgework of other Scouts. At this age, the Scouts do much more of the planning and running of activities than in Cubs, and will often run sections of their meetings themselves. The Adult Leaders assist the youth when they organise and run activities, and often take the responsibility for organising larger events like camps.

== Ideals ==
Scouts share their Promise and Law with the other four sections in the movement.

=== Scout Promise ===
There are two version of the Promise. The new one (first), and the original (second). Each member may choose which one they would like to make when joining

On my honour, I promise
To do my best,
To be true to my spiritual beliefs,
To contribute to my community and our world,
To help other people,
And to live by the Scout Law.

or

On my honour
I promise that I will do my best
To do my duty to my God, and
To the King of Australia,
To help other people,
And to live by the Scout Law.

=== Scout Law ===
Be Respectful:
Be friendly and considerate
Care for others and the environment

Do What is Right:
Be trustworthy, honest and fair
Use resources wisely

Believe in Myself:
Learn from my experiences
Face challenges with courage

== Badgework ==
=== Milestones ===
There are three levels of Milestones – Milestone 1, Milestone 2, & Milestone 3. These Milestones are obtained by completing a set number of participates, assists, and leads of activities, as well as a personal reflection. As a general guideline, Scouts complete Milestone 1 by twelve years, three months of age, Milestone 2 by thirteen years, seven months of age, and Milestone 3 by fifteen years of age. Milestone badges are worn on the right front panel of the uniform.

=== Special Interest Areas (SIA) ===
There are six Special Interest Areas – Adventure & Sport, Arts & Literature, Creating a Better World, Environment, Growth & Development, and STEM & Innovation. Scouts must complete six SIA projects across at least three different Areas. Each project must take a minimum of eight hours to complete. Projects are fully planned, executed, and reviewed by the Scouts. Projects may be completed as individuals, or in project patrols. SIA badges are worn in the middle of the left sleeve of the uniform.

=== Outdoor Adventure Skills (OAS) ===
There are two types of Outdoor Adventure Skills. Core and Specialist. Core OAS include Bushcraft, Bushwalking, and Camping while Specialist OAS are split into terrafirma: Alpine, Cycling, and Vertical – and water-based: Aquatics, Boating, and Paddling. Each discipline has 9 Stages to be completed throughout a youth member's entire Scouting Journey (from Joey Scouts to Rover Scouts). Some disciplines split into even more specialist streams once they reach a certain Stage. Scouts must reach Stage 5 in all Core Disciplines, and have 10 Stage progressions in total, including Core Stage progressions. OAS badges are worn at the bottom of the left sleeve of the uniform.

=== Peak Award ===
Sometimes referred to as the Australian Scout Award (formally Medallion), the Peak Award is the highest level badge a Scout can earn, and is akin to the Joey Scout Challenge Award for Joeys, the Grey Wolf Award for Cubs, the Queen Scout Award for Venturers, and the Baden Powell Scout Award for Rovers.

To earn the Peak Award, a Scout must earn the Introduction to Scouting (unless completed in a previous section), Introduction to Section, Milestone 3, complete the six SIA projects, meet the OAS requirements of obtaining Stage 5 in the Core Disciplines plus 10 total Stage progressions, as well as lead a 3 day, 2 night Adventurous Journey (hike or other self propelled movement like cycling or canoeing), attend a weekend Leadership Course, and do a personal reflection of their journey in the Scout Section.

The badge consists of the Scouts Australia logo in white above some wattle with a kangaroo to the left and an emu to the right to mimic the Australian Coat of Arms, on a plain navy blue diamond-shaped badge with green edging, and is placed at the top of the left sleeve of the uniform. Once earned, a Scout may wear the badge for the rest of their Scouting Journey, even into other sections.

== See also ==
- Scout (Scouting)
