= World Federation of Independent Scouts World Jamboree =

Large-scale youth event

WFIS world jamboree
- Badge 3rd WFIS World Jamboree 2011
- Owner: World Federation of Independent Scouts
- Headquarters: Puebla, México
- Location: Flor del Bosque, Puebla
- Country: Mexico
- Coordinates: 19° 2'15.27"N 98° 6'48.88"O
- Date: 16–23 July 2011
- General Coord: Gerardo Martínez Hernández
- Operative: Silvia Armenta Hernández
- Administrative: José Moreno López
- Affiliation: World Federation of Independent Scouts

The WFIS world jamboree is a Scouting jamboree of the World Federation of Independent Scouts.

== Jamborees ==
Year	Event	Location, Country	Theme/Name	Attendance
2002	WFIS World Jamboree 2002	Skørping, Denmark	Together we are strongest	850
2007	2nd WFIS World Jamboree 2007	Medellín, Colombia		2000
2011	3rd WFIS World Jamboree 2011	Puebla de Zaragoza, Mexico	For a world without borders	1000

== Moots ==
Year	Event	Location, Country	Theme/Name	Attendance
2026	WFIS World Rover Scout Moot 2026	Denmark		

== 3rd Jamboree in Mexico ==
The 3rd World WFIS Jamboree was held from 16 to 23 July 2011. There were 1000 WFIS members from around 40 countries between 3 and 21 years of age. There were a great variety of activities, including workshops with various NGOs and different indigenous groups, farm activities for Cub Packs, tours in Puebla and Cuetzalan, visits to the preHispanic ruins of Yohualichan, hikes and excursions, treks and cultural activities.
