= Perry Lakes Reserve =

Nature reserve in Perth, Western Australia

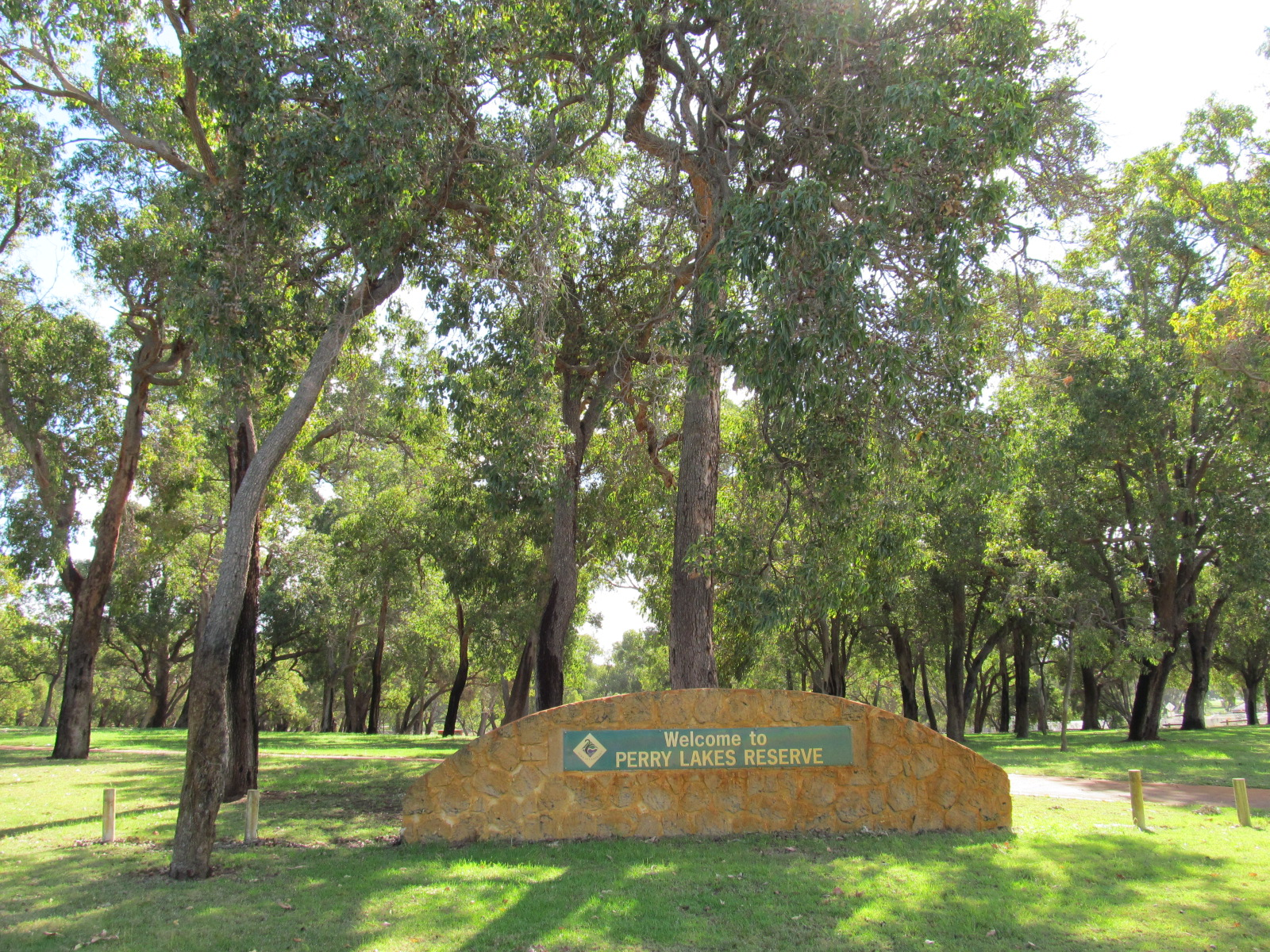
- Interactive map of Perry Lakes Reserve
- Location: Perth, Western Australia
- Nearest city: Floreat
- Coordinates: 31°56′38″S 115°46′50″E
- Area: 80 hectares (200 acres)
- Operator: Town of Cambridge

The Perry Lakes Reserve is a nature reserve located approximately 7 kilometres (4.3 mi) west of Perth, the capital city of Western Australia, in the suburb of Floreat. Within the 80-hectare (200-acre) reserve are two lakes, East Lake and West Lake, comprising approximately 12.6 hectares (31 acres).

In its current form, the reserve dates from 1962 when the area was landscaped in association with the construction of Perry Lakes Stadium and associated sporting tracks and facilities for the 1962 British Empire and Commonwealth Games. The Australian Scout Jamboree has been held in the parkland twice, during the summers of 1979/80 and 1994/95. The sporting complex was demolished in 2011 to make way for housing development.

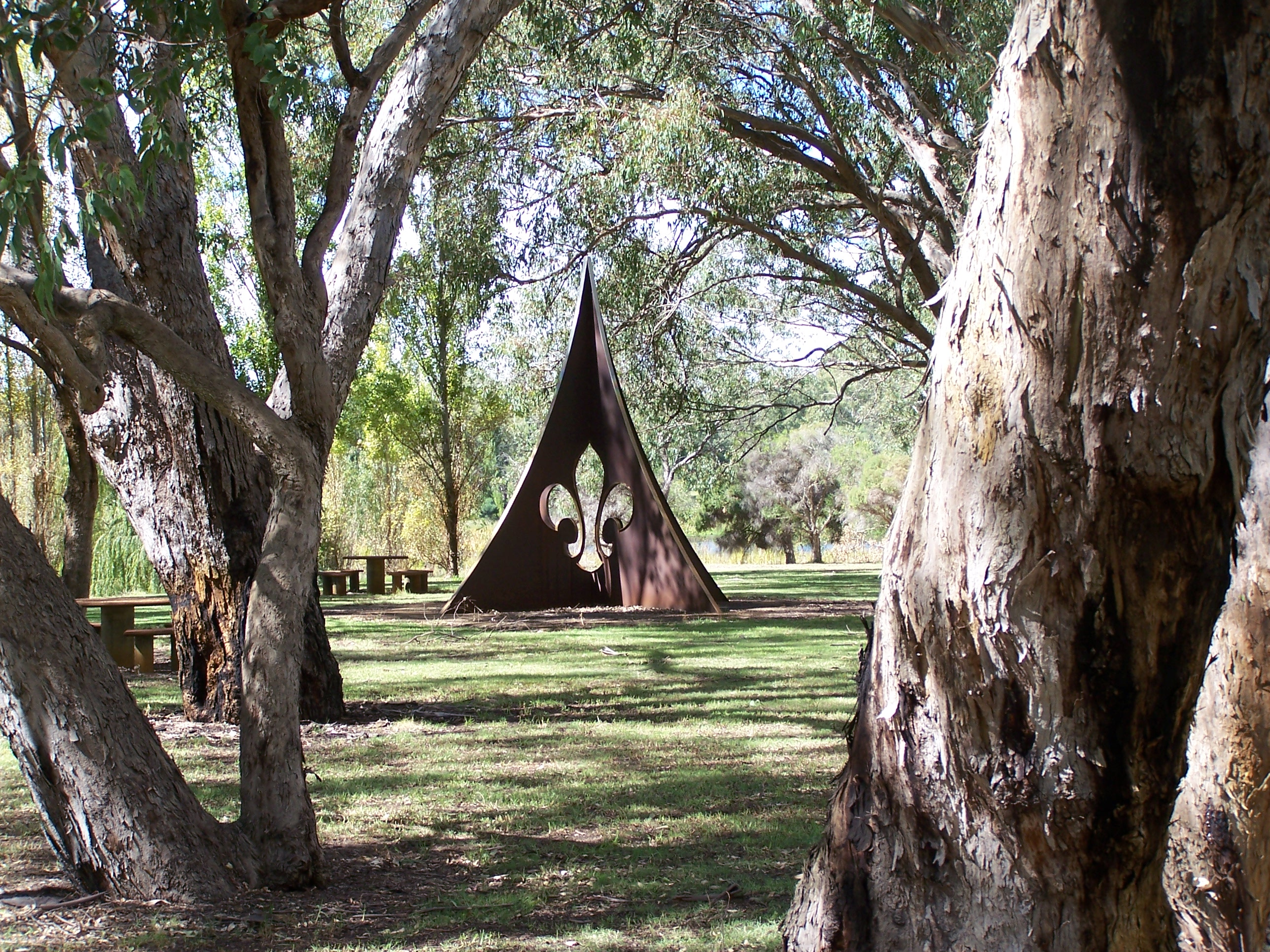
Sculpture to commemorate the 1979 Jamboree at Perry Lakes and 75 years of Scouts

The reserve has required re-evaluation as the lakes have changed over time, and subsequent studies have investigated the management of the lake areas.

Control of the area has also alternated between local and state government authority.

== See also ==
- List of lakes of Australia § Western Australia
