= Venturer Scouts (Australia) =

Scouts Australia youth program

Scouts Australia
- Age range: 14.5–18
- Country: Australia
- Founded: 1946
- Founder: Lord Baden Powell
- Membership: 84 000
| Previous; Scouts | Next; Rovers |

Venturer Scouts, formerly Senior Scouts, and commonly known simply as Venturers, is the fourth section of Scouts Australia, and was first formed in 1946. Venturers are aged between 14.5 and 18 years of age and are organised into Units, which can be a part of a single Scout Group or a stand-alone group. Both types of Unit take Scouts from any Scout Group. Although not in common usage, the motto of the Venturer Scout section in Australia is "Look Wide".

The highest award in Venturers is the King's Scout Award. This award recognises people who can set their own challenging goals and achieve them. This section of Scouts Australia is about Venturers organising and running their own activities with leader support, moving away from a reliance on adult leaders, under the concept of "Youth Leading, Adults Supporting".

== Structure ==
A Venturer Unit is run by its unit council, usually consisting of a unit chair, secretary, treasurer and some general members. Some larger units also include an assistant unit chair, social secretary, fundraising coordinator, quartermaster, or assistant secretaries and treasurers.

While the younger sections are represented by their leaders at the district level, Venturers are encouraged to attend their monthly district venturer council. In Australia, all scouting is divided by state ('branches'), and then into smaller, geographically defined, districts. The district venturer scout council (DVSC) is a monthly meeting of the venturer scouts and leaders in the district which serves both as a check on the quality of the potential King's Scouts in the district and for sharing information between the Units in the area. It is also a social meeting for both the leaders and venturers to catch up with each other. Where the district, for whatever reason, is not appropriate for these meetings, typically due to low numbers in the district, a zone venturer scout council (ZVSC) is formed as a replacement for the district.

Branch level activities are becoming more and more popular because of the difficulty in running unit level activities. Unit management is a problem for many units because of small number of attendances and difficulty in running successful activities for small groups, as well as motivation. Most branches have a themed competitive hike run at Easter, plus many smaller activities, normally put on by dedicated leaders. These often are courses required for badge work as well.

=== Lone Venturer Unit ===
In the states of South Australia, Western Australia, New South Wales and Queensland, there are Lone Scout Groups. These Scout Groups cater for Scouts of all ages who are unable to attend weekly meetings as there are no Scout Halls close to where they live or the Scout Halls close by do not have the relevant Scout age group. Meetings are done on-line. Venturer Scouts in Lone Scout Groups are thus called Lone Venturers. Most states do have activities where all members come together. In South Australia, the Lone Scout Group consists of all sections and they attend an annual camp in September/October.

=== Uniform ===
Venturer scouts wear a navy shirt with maroon shoulder yoke, with beige or stone-coloured pants, shorts, or skirt for formal occasions. This is accompanied with a scarf, fastened with a woggle or less commonly a friendship knot, which relates to group, event or association like a scout show. In Queensland, the same scarf is worn throughout the state. Badges may be sewn onto the chest panel or either sleeve according to official layout guidelines. These include badges earnt through the Achievement Pathways as well as event badges, Introduction to Section badges, District and Region badges, and additional awards like First Aid.

=== Sea Scouts ===
There is a small percentage of groups that are known as sea scouts. These groups still practise the same way as regular scouting groups, but often have a higher focus on water activities. The first such group to identify as sea scouts, and regarded as being the first scout group in Australia are the 1st Victorian Sea Scout Group which was founded in Albert Park, Victoria, dating to 1912. The 1st Victorian Sea Scout Group is currently still active and hosts joey, cub, scout, and venturer units in the Albert Park Reserve, located in the suburb of South Melbourne, in the boundaries of City of Port Phillip.

== Badge Work ==
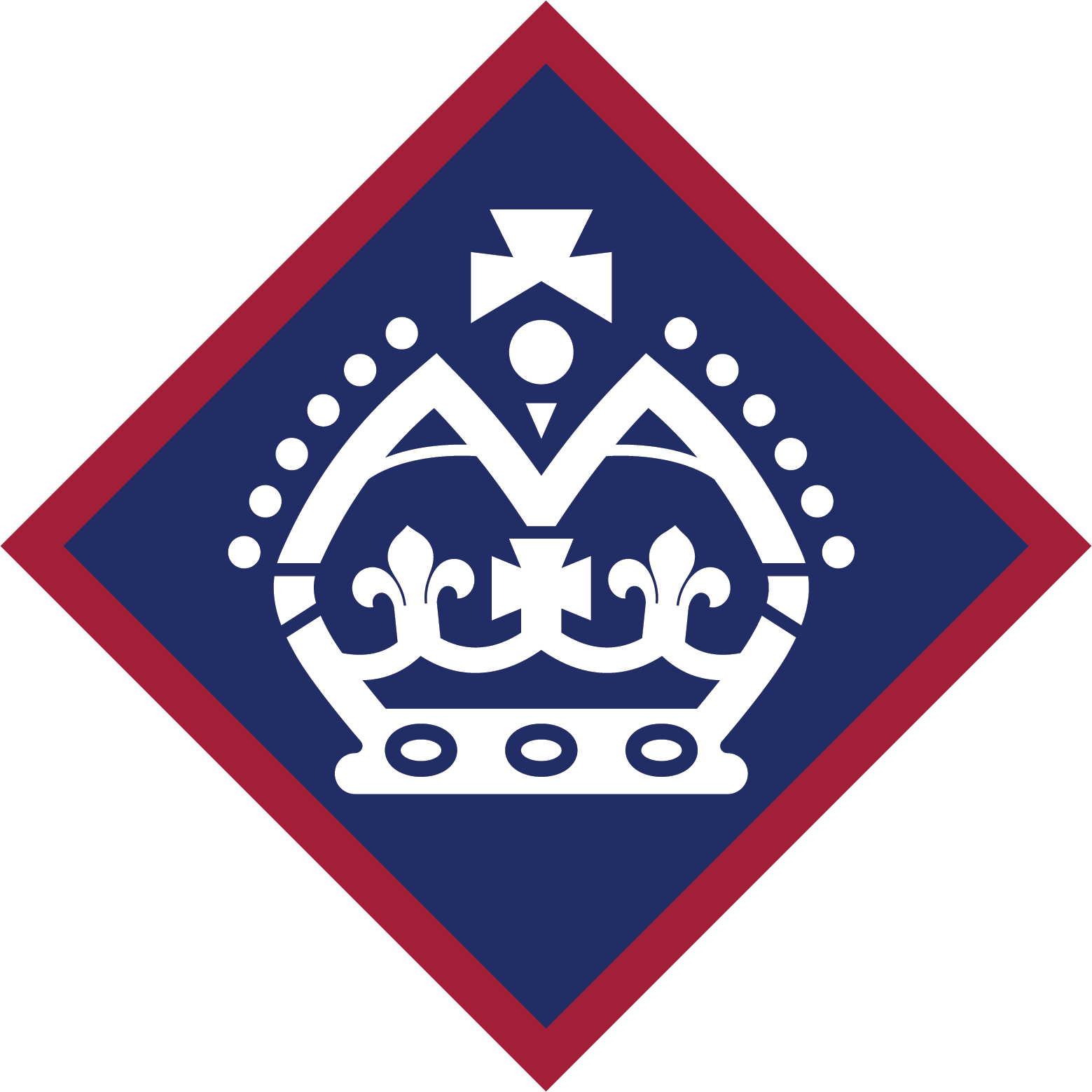
King's Scout Badge as worn by recipients of the Award

The highest award in the Venturer Scout section, known as the Peak Award, is the King's Scout Award. The King's Scout Award is about members extending their commitment and achievement in a variety of areas, to strive for better than they do already.

Within Scouts Australia's Achievement Pathways system, earning the award requires:

- Introduction to Scouting badge
- Introduction to Venturer Scout Section badge
- Milestones
  - Milestone 1 badge (participate in 24 activities, assist with leading two, lead one)
  - Milestone 2 badge (participate in 20 activities, assist with leading three, lead two)
  - Milestone 3 badge (participate in 16 activities, assist with leading four, lead four)
- Outdoor Adventure Skills
  - Stage 5 badges in the skill areas of Camping, Bushcraft and Bushwalking
  - 12 progressions to higher stages in any of the nine skill areas
- Special Interest Areas
  - Six projects in at least three different areas of:
    - Adventure and sport
    - Arts and literature
    - STEM and innovation
    - Growth and development
    - Creating a better world
    - Environment
- Completion of a Leadership/Personal Development Course
- Completion of an "Adventurous Journey", a self-led outdoor journey of four days and three nights
- Completion of a personal reflection on the award programme

== Australian Venture ==
Venturers also have the opportunity to participate in a "Venture", the Venturing equivalent of a Jamboree. Ventures differ from jamborees in the greater freedom and latitude Venturers experience there, in line with the greater freedoms associated with being in the Venturer section. There are a number of on-site activities, as well as an off site expedition, normally totalling about 12 days long. The most recent Australian Venture was held in Lardner Park, Victoria, in January 2024.

== Activities ==
Some of the activities Venturers participate in include:

- rock climbing
- abseiling
- flying
- canoeing
- canyoning
- 4WD
- camping (including ventures, jamborees and state events such as Dragon Skin in New South Wales)
- bushwalking

== See also ==
- Australian Venture
- Venturer Scout
- Venturer Sea Scouts
- Venturing (Boy Scouts of America)
