= Cub Scouts (Australia) =

Youth section of the Scout movement in Australia

Scouts Australia
- Age range: 8–11
- Country: Australia
- Founded: 1916
- Founder: Lord Baden-Powell
| Previous; Joey Scouts | Next; Scouts |
- Website; Cub Scouts

Cub Scouts is the section of Scouts Australia for boys and girls aged 8 to 11 (inclusive), often known simply as 'Cubs'. The Cub Scout section follows after Joey Scouts and is before Scouts. Cub Scouts wear a uniform shirt with navy blue panels, and yellow shoulders.

The motto is "Create the Path".

== Patrol organisation ==
The Cub Scout Unit is usually composed of several adult leaders, and several patrols of approximately six children. The leader of a patrol is called a patrol leader, an older cub scout in the unit. Second in command of a patrol is an assistant patrol leader. Each week the patrols take turns to be in charge of some of the unit's activities, such as selecting some of the games to play, and running activities. Each patrol wears a distinctive colour band on their scarf, choosing from red, yellow, green, orange, blue, black, white, grey, tan, and purple.

=== Unit councils ===
The Unit Council is an informal meeting of leaders and the patrol leaders, and often assistant patrol leaders (although any member of the patrol can be invited), to discuss things such as schedules for the following term, what activities or camp were liked or disliked during the term, and what the patrol would like to try in the future. At this age, the Cub Scouts do more of the planning and running of activities than in Joeys, but the Adult Leaders still take an active role in organizing and running activities, especially camps

== Ideals ==
Cub Scouts share their Promise and Law with the other four sections in the movement.

=== Scout Promise ===
There are two version of the Promise: The new one (first), and the original (second). Each member may choose which one to make when joining.

On my honour, I promise
To do my best,
To be true to my spiritual beliefs,
To contribute to my community and our world,
To help other people,
And to live by the Scout Law.

or

On my honour
I promise that I will do my best
To do my duty to my God, and
To the King of Australia,
To help other people,
And to live by the Scout Law.

=== Scout Law ===
Be Respectful
Be friendly and considerate
Care for others and the environment

Do What is Right
Be trustworthy, honest and fair
Use resources wisely

Believe in Myself
Learn from my experiences
Face challenges with courage

== Badgework ==
=== Milestones ===
There are three levels of Milestones – Milestone 1, Milestone 2, & Milestone 3. These Milestones are obtained by completing a set number of participates, assists, and leads of activities, as well as a personal reflection. As a general guideline, Cub Scouts complete Milestone 1 by eight years of age, Milestone 2 by nine or ten years of age, and Milestone 3 by eleven years of age. Milestone badges are worn on the right front panel of the uniform.

=== Special Interest Areas (SIA) ===
There are six Special Interest Areas – Adventure & Sport, Arts & Literature, Creating a Better World, Environment, Growth & Development, and STEM & Innovation. Cubs must complete six SIA projects across at least two different Areas. Each project must take a minimum of four hours to complete. Projects are fully planned, executed, and reviewed by the Cubs. Projects may be completed as individuals, or in project patrols. SIA badges are worn in the middle of the left sleeve of the uniform.

=== Outdoor Adventure Skills (OAS) ===
There are two types of Outdoor Adventure Skills. Core and Specialist. Core OAS include Bushcraft, Bushwalking, and Camping while Specialist OAS are split into terrafirma: Alpine, Cycling, and Vertical – and water-based: Aquatics, Boating, and Paddling. Each discipline has nine stages to be completed throughout a youth member's entire Scouting Journey (from Joey Scouts to Rover Scouts). Some disciplines split into even more specialist streams once they reach a certain Stage. Cub Scouts must reach Stage 3 in all Core Disciplines, and have eight stage progressions in total, including Core Stage progressions. OAS badges are worn at the bottom of the left sleeve of the uniform.

=== Peak award ===
Sometimes still referred to as the Grey Wolf, the Peak Award is the highest level badge a Cub Scout can earn, and is akin to the Joey Scout Challenge Award for Joeys, the Australian Scout Award for Scouts, the Queen's Scout Award for Venturers, and the Baden-Powell Scout Award for Rovers.

To earn the Peak Award, a Cub Scout must earn the Introduction to Scouting (unless completed in Joeys), Introduction to Section, Milestone 3, complete the six SIA projects, meet the OAS requirements of obtaining Stage 3 in the Core Disciplines plus eight total Stage progressions, as well as lead a four hour Adventurous Journey (hike), attend a Leadership Course of at least one day's duration, and do a personal reflection of their journey in the Cub Section.

The badge consists of a white outline of a wolf's head on a plain navy blue diamond-shaped badge with yellow edging, and is placed at the top of the left sleeve of the uniform. Once earned, a Scout may wear the badge for the rest of their Scouting journey, even into other sections.

== Structure pre-2020 ==
Preceding a national programme change, the Cub Scout section drew its programme largely from the Jungle Book. Leaders' names were generally based on characters from the story, such as Akela, Bagheera, or Baloo. A patrol was called a 'six', their patrol leader a 'sixer', and the assistant patrol leader a 'second'. The unit council was the 'pack council'.

=== Badgework ===
Achievement badges

There were 34 different achievement badges that cub scouts could complete, arranged into five different categories: Arts and Literature, Nature, Science and Technology, Sports and Recreation and Our World. Each badge had two levels, and either could be completed on their own. Achievement badges were worn on the right sleeve of the uniform.

Boomerangs

There were three levels of boomerangs – the bronze, silver and gold boomerangs – obtained by completing mandatory sections in The Cub Scout Record Book, and a selection of elective activities. As a general guideline, the Bronze Boomerang was completed by cub scouts of eight years of age, the Silver by cub scouts nine years of age, and the Gold by cub scouts 10 years of age. Boomerang badges were worn on the left sleeve of the uniform.

Grey Wolf Award

Formerly called the Yellow Cord, the Grey Wolf Award was the highest level badge a Cub Scout could earn, akin to the then-Promise Challenge for Joeys, then-Australian Scout Medallion for Scouts, then-Queen's Scout Award for Venturers, or Baden-Powell Award for Rovers. The requirement for this badge, which is the transition phase to becoming a Scout, was leadership of the Cub Scout pack.

It involved being awarded the Gold Boomerang, attending a series of outdoor activities, two pack councils, four Level 2 Achievement badges with one from each of the different categories, a Special Interest Badge (six options) and a resource or game that can be presented to the pack.

The badge consisted of a wolf's head superimposed on an orange and blue boarded diamond, and is placed on the left sleeve on the uniform. The Grey Wolf Award was able to be worn on the Scout shirt until the member achieves the Pioneer Badge.

Grey Wolf Hike

The Grey Wolf hike was a hike taken by Cub Scouts that wanted to obtain the Grey Wolf Award. They have to plan and lead a walk, with at least three cubs following along, for a minimum of two kilometres, and for approximately two hours. This hike was one of the biggest challenges and one of the most important things needed to complete the Grey Wolf Award.

== Earlier Australian history ==
In 1916, the Wolf Cub Section commenced in Australia at the same time as the British programme, boys of

junior scouts who are too young and too small to be boy scouts. The standard height and age are as follows: 9 years to 14 years, and 3ft. 6in. to 4ft. 6in. These lads do not have camps, neither do they partake in any night work, unless, of course, by the special permission of the parents.

Prior to the 1972 national programme New Design or The design for tomorrow, the section was known as Wolf Cubs, the leaders being Cubmasters (CMs) and Lady Cubmistresses (LCMs). The new programme commenced 1 January 1972, becoming the Cub Section, with Cub Leaders (CLs). Later it was called the Cub Scout Section.

From 1988, girls were able to join the Cub Scout section as youth members.

== See also ==
- Scouts Australia
- Cub Scout
