= Joey Scouts =

Children's training program of The Scout Association of Australia

Joeys
- Age range: 5–7
- Country: Australia
- Founded: 1990; 36 years ago
- Founder: Lord Baden Powell The Scout Association of Australia
| | Next; Cub Scouts (Australia) |
- Website; Joey Scouts

Joeys is a training program for boys and girls aged 5 to 7 (inclusive) operated by The Scout Association of Australia. It is its youngest age training program and for those younger than Cubs. Joeys wear a uniform shirt with navy blue panels and tawny shoulders. Its motto is now "Discover Adventure".

== Organisation ==
A Joey unit usually has several adult leaders and a number of patrols of approximately six children. A patrol may have a patrol leader, usually an older Joey and an Assistant Patrol Leader, who are only nominal leaders as the 5 to 7 year olds Joeys take on very little of the leadership. Each patrol wears a distinctive colour band on their scarf, choosing from red, yellow, green, orange, blue, black, white, grey, tan, and purple.

=== Unit councils ===
The unit council is a meeting of the adult leaders and patrol leaders and sometimes assistant patrol leaders (although any member of the patrol can be invited) to discuss past and future activities. At 5 to 7 years olds, the adult leaders do most of the planning and running of activities but involved Joeys to introduce them to these concepts.

== Ideals ==
The Joey's program refers to and teaches Joeys about the Scout Promise and Scout Law but 5 to 7 year olds are considered too young to understand and undertake the promise. Instead, they focus on the three headings:

Be Respectful:
Be friendly and considerate
Care for others and the environment

Do What is Right:
Be trustworthy, honest and fair
Use resources wisely

Believe in Myself:
Learn from my experiences
Face challenges with courage

The Scout Association of Australia uses two version of promise, the original Scout Promise and a new one. Each child may choose which one they would like to make when joining.

On my honour
I promise that I will do my best
To do my duty to my God, and
To the King of Australia,
To help other people,
And to live by the Scout Law.

or

On my honour, I promise
To do my best,
To be true to my spiritual beliefs,
To contribute to my community and our world,
To help other people,
And to live by the Scout Law.

== Badges ==
=== Milestones ===
There are three levels of Milestones - Milestone 1, Milestone 2, & Milestone 3. Each Milestone is obtained by completing a set number of participates, assists, and leads of activities, as well as a personal reflection. As a general guideline, Joeys complete Milestone 1 by five years of age, Milestone 2 by six years of age, and Milestone 3 by seven years of age. Milestone badges are worn on the right front panel of the uniform.

=== Special Interest Areas (SIA) ===
There are six SIAs - Adventure & Sport, Arts & Literature, Creating a Better World, Environment, Growth & Development, and STEM & Innovation. Joeys must complete six SIA projects across at least two different Areas. Each project must take a minimum of two hours to complete. Projects are fully planned, executed and reviewed by the Joeys, under the supervision from adult leaders. Projects may be completed as individuals, or in project patrols. SIA badges are worn in the middle of the left sleeve of the uniform.

=== Outdoor Adventure Skills (OAS) ===
Core OAS include bushcraft, bushwalking and camping. Specialist OAS are split into terrafirma: alpine, cycling and vertical, and water-based: aquatics, boating and paddling. Each discipline has 9 stages to be completed throughout a youth entire journey through The Scout Association of Australia's programs, from Joeys to Rovers. Some disciplines split into even more specialist streams once they reach a certain stage. Joeys must reach Stage 1 in all core OAS, and may complete some specialist stages, although not required. OAS badges are worn at the bottom of the left sleeve of the uniform.

=== Peak Award ===
The peak award or Joey challenge award, is the highest achievement badge a Joey can earn. To earn it, a Joey must earn the Introduction to Scouting, Introduction to Joeys, Milestone 3, complete the six SIA projects, meet the OAS requirements of obtaining Stage 1 in the core disciplines, as well as lead a three-hour adventurous journey and do a personal reflection of their journey. The badge has a white outline of a kangaroo's head on a plain navy-blue diamond-shaped badge with tawny edging. It is worn at the top of the left sleeve of the uniform. Once earned, it may be worn for the rest of the youth's time in The Scout Association of Australia's programs.
