= Sri Lanka Scout Association =

Scouting organization in Sri Lanka

- Headquarters: Colombo
- Country: Sri Lanka
- Founded: 1912
- Membership: 110,000 (as of June 2023)
- Chief Scout: President Anura Kumara Dissanayake
- President: Ransiri Perera
- Chief Commissioner: Manoj Nanayakkara
- Affiliation: World Organization of the Scout Movement
- Website www.scout.lk

The Sri Lanka Scout Association (Sinhala: ශ්‍රී ලංකා බාලදක්ෂ සංගමය Shri Lanka Baladaksha Sangamaya; Tamil: இலங்கைச் சாரணர் சங்கம்), is a Scouting organization in Sri Lanka operated by the Ceylon Scout Council. The Ceylon Scout Council is a corporation formed by Act No. 13 of 1957. The association became a member of the World Organization of the Scout Movement in 1953. The coeducational Sri Lanka Scout Association has 33,709 members as of 2014. in 2016 the year that the National Organisation reached 104 years the Scouting Population in Sri Lanka had increased to 55,078 the growth taking place against the year 2015 was 29% which was a great achievement by the SLSA.

There are various community development projects carried out in cooperation with government organizations, United Nations and other service organisations.

Scouting has been introduced into the prisons. It has spread to other institutions such as certified schools. There are also Scout units for handicapped boys such as the blind and deaf and for boys in leprosy hospitals.

== History ==
- 1912 - In 1912, the first recorded troop of Boy Scouts in Sri Lanka was formed at Christ Church College, Matale by District Civil Engineer, Francis George Stevens.
- 1913 - The second Scout troop in the country, the 1st Kandy Dharmaraja Scout Group, was established at Dharmaraja College, Kandy
- 1914 - (14 June) The first Colombo (Governor's Own) Scout troop was established. It was the first open Scout troop and the third Scout troop in Sri Lanka
- 1914 - The 1st Galle Mahinda Scout Group, was established at Mahinda College, Galle by Francis George Stevens
- 1914 - Scouting was introduced to Trinity College, Kandy by J. N. Thomas.
- 1916 - Creation of the 10th Colombo Ananda College Scout Troop at Ananda College, Colombo
- 1916 - Creation of the 4th Galle Aloysius' Scout Group at St. Aloysius' College, Galle by Fr. Murphy
- 1916 - Western Province Rally at Havelock Park, Colombo.
- 1916 - 4th Kandy Scout Troop St Anthony's College Kandy started by Rev Fr Dom James
- 1917 - Scouting was introduced to Wesley College, Colombo by Rev. P. T. Cash,
- 1916 - The Boy Scouts Association of the United Kingdom formed its Ceylon Branch.
- 1917 - King's Flag (awarded by His Majesty the King George V) was won by the 1st Kandy Dharmaraja Scouts for the first time in Ceylon Scouting history.
- 1917 - First all Ceylon Rally at Havelock Race Course, Colombo.
- 1917 - A. B. Rambukwella of the 1st Kandy Dharmaraja Scout Group, won the King's Scout Badge as the first Ceylonese King Scout.
- 1918 - King's Flag (awarded by His Majesty the King George V) was won by 1st Kandy Dharmaraja Scouts for the second time in Ceylon Scouting history.
- 1919 - King's Flag (awarded by His Majesty the King George V) was won by 1st Kandy Dharmaraja Scouts for the third time in Ceylon Scouting history.
- 1921 - 1921 - B.P.'s visit to Sri Lanka with Lady Olave Baden-Powell; Scouting started in Prisons.
- 1925 - Vernon Grenier becomes Chief Commissioner.
- 1930 - Scout HQ moves to an old guardroom at Galle Face, Colombo.
- 1930 - J.H. De Saram becomes the first native Chief Commissioner.
- 1932 - All Ceylon Scout Craft exhibition at Katugastota, Kandy.
- 1934 - Lord and Lady Baden-Powell visit Sri Lanka
- 1942 - K. Somasundaram becomes Chief Commissioner.
- 1948 - Col. C.P. Jayawardene becomes the Chief Commissioner. New Buildings of National Headquarters. Pedru Camp-site at Nuwera-Eliya. Job Week scheme started. Sinhala and Tamil editions of Scouting for Boys were published.
- 1952 - Ceylon Jamboree at Koombi Kele, Colombo. (near the present BMICH, Colombo.)
- 1953 - The Boy Scouts Association Ceylon Branch is succeeded by the Ceylon Boy Scouts Association.
- 1954 - E. W. Kannangara becomes Chief Commissioner.
- 1957 - Participation in Jubilee Jamboree in England.
- 1957 - Ceylon Boy Scouts Council (Incorporation) Act passed by the parliament nationalizing the former Ceylon branch of The Boy Scouts Association of the United Kingdom under the control of the Ceylon Boy Scouts Council.
- 1962 - Golden Jubilee Jamboree at Race Course, Colombo.
- 1965 - 25 November - 'Cub Scout Tattoo' a Unique Performance in Police ground.
- 1965 - Mr.Vincent Perera, a Mayor Of Colombo renamed the Lower lake road to "BALADAKSHA MAWATHA"
- 1965 - "BALADAKSHA HANDA" Special Sinhala Radio Program Started with SLBC.
- 1966 - The Cub Scout Golden Jubilee Celebrations in Sri Lanka and the World.
- 1967 - Fitzroy H. Gunesekera becomes Chief Commissioner.
- 1967 - Creation of the 32nd Colombo Nalanda College Scout Troop at Nalanda College, Colombo
- 1972 - C.M.P. Wanigatunga becomes Chief Commissioner.
- 1977 - H. Ratnasuriya becomes Chief Commissioner. National HQ shifted to Chitthampalan Gardiner Mawatha, Colombo 02.
- 1978 - Old Rajans Scouts Association (ORSA), the first South Asian old Scout association formed by the old Scouts of 1st Kandy Dharmaraja Scout Group, Dharmaraja College, Kandy.
- 1982 - Theodore Seneviratne becomes Chief Commissioner. Special Commemorative Stamp in honour of B.P. on 125th Birth Anniversary.
- 1983 - 3rd National Jamboree at Walisinghe Harischandra Ground Anuradhapura.
- 1984 - 2nd National Cubboree.
- 1987 - Rex Jayasinha becomes Chief Commissioner.
- 1990 - 1st SAARC Jamboree at Vihara Maha Devi Park, Colombo. Chief Commissioner Rex Jayasinha dies just before Jamboree. J. Lionel Silva becomes Chief Commissioner.
- 1992 - 4th National Jamboree in Kurunegala. M. Mazzahim Mohideen becomes Chief Commissioner.
- 1997 - K.H. Camillus Fernando becomes Chief Commissioner.
- 1998 - 5th National Jamboree, Pallekelle, Kandy.
- 1998 - First Asia-Pacific Workshop on Information Technology - Colombo, First Web page hosted by the University of Morotuwa.
- 2002 - H.S. Weerakoon becomes Chief Commissioner. 6th National Scout Jamboree, Balapitiya.
- 2006 - 7th National Scout Jamboree, Nuwara Eliya.
- 2007 - C. Batuwangala becomes Chief Commissioner.
- 2009 - First female Cub Scouts invested on 23 January
- 2009 - Chathura Deshapriya Mataraarachchi of 1st Kandy Dharmaraja Scout Group was awarded the Outstanding Asia-Pacific Scout Award.
- 2009 - The initiation of Sri Lanka Old Scouts and Old Guides Association and the Kandy District President Scouts and President Guides Association was done
- 2010 - 8th National Scout Jamboree, Angunakolapelessa.
- 2011 - Sri Lankan First Equestrian Scouts are invested, in Premadasa Riding School collaboration with SLEA at Nugegoda. Sri Lanka is the first country to introduce Equestrian Scouting to the Scouting agenda in the Asia Pacific Region.
- 2012 The Sri Lanka Scout Association celebrated 100 years of Scouting in Sri Lanka, organized a centenary Scout walk, issued a new stamp and a Rs.2/= coin, and was host of the Asia-Pacific Scout Jamboree at Gam Udawa & Kandalama sites Dambulla, Matale District in the Central Province of Sri Lanka from 31 March to 7 April 2012 with approximately 8,000 Scouts including overseas participants from 23 countries.
- 2012 February 22 - published New Scouting Magazine Scouting Magazine - Sri Lanka for Sri Lankan scouts.
- 2012 - 29th APR and Sri Lanka Centenary Scout Jamboree, Dambulla.
- 2012 - Sidath Chandima Gajanayaka was awarded the Outstanding Asia-Pacific Scout Award.
- 2012 - Prof. Nimal De Silva becomes Chief Commissioner on 19 April 2012.
- 2013 - 1st Kandy Dharmaraja Scout Group together with Old Rajans Scouts Association held the Rajans International Scout Gathering of Centennial 2013 (RISGO 2013) at Lake View Park International Scout Centre to celebrate centennial year of the group with Scouts representing all Scouting regions of the world from 30 countries.
- 2013 - 10th National Cubboree, St. Anthony's College, Wattala. Sri Lanka.
- 2013 - 17th Kandy Trinity College Scout Group organized and held "Around Sri Lanka in 12 Days" Bicycle Ride as a prelude to their centenary to be celebrated in 2014 as the Scouts rode around the Coastal belt of the country covering more than 1600 km. They also raised funds for the New Cancer Hospital to be built in Kandy as well as created awareness on cancer throughout their ride.
- 2014 - 8th Asia-Pacific Scout Leaders Summit 2014 at Goldi Sands Hotel Ethukala, Negombo.
- 2014 - 1st Kandy Dharmaraja Scout Group established a Guinness World Records by creating the World Largest neckerchief and woggle.
- 2014 - Colombo Centenary International Scout Jamboree (CCISJ 2014) 1 to 7 August 2014 at Ygro Campsite, Madampe.
- 2014 - 7 October, opening a new chapter in Sri Lankan Scouting for (age 5 ½ to 7) සිඟිති බාලදක්ෂ 'Kids Scouting'.
- 20 May 2015 - Sri Lanka's President Maithreepala Sirisena took Oaths as Chief Scout of Sri Lanka and Patron of the Guild
- 2016 - 9th National Scout Jamboree, Jaffna.
- 2016 – 100 years of Cub Scouting in Sri Lanka and the World
- 13 May 2016 - 11th National Cubboree, Richmond College, Galle, Sri Lanka.
- 2017 - Mr. Meril Gunatilaka becomes Chief Commissioner.
- 17 Aug 2017 - Deputy Chief Commissioner Mr. Janaprith Salinda Fernando elected to World Scout Committee member for the term 2017- 2020
- 2020 - Major General Milinda Peiris becomes Chief Commissioner on 13 January 2020.
- 17 Jan 2020 - Sri Lanka's President Gotabaya takes oath as Chief Scout of Sri Lanka.
- 2021 - Mr. Janaprith Fernando 21st Chief Commissioner of the SLSA on October 1, 2021.
- 3–5 April 2020 - special edition of #JOTI, engaged in online WOSM with a commitment to keep Scouting active, even in COVID-19 pandemic times.
- 2026 - Mr. Manoj Nanayakkara becomes 22nd Chief Commissioner on 13 January 2026.

=== All Ceylon Rally ===
1. 1st All Ceylon Rally, Havelock Race Course, Colombo, 1917
2. 2nd All Ceylon Rally, Barracks, Kandy, 1918
3. 3rd All Ceylon Rally, Kandy, 1919
4. 4th All Ceylon Rally, Havelock Race Course, Colombo, 1921 (Lord & Lady BP Arrivals)
5. 5th All Ceylon Rally, Kandy, 1922 (Eastern tour of the Prince of Wales 23 March 1922)
6. 6th All Ceylon Rally, Colombo, 1924 (Farewell Ceremony of The British Governor William Manning)

=== National Scout Jamboree ===
National Jamboree is organised by National HQ.

1. 1st National Scout Jamboree, Bullers Road, Colombo, 1952
2. 2nd National Scout Jamboree, Havelock Race Course, Colombo, 1962
3. 3rd National Scout Jamboree, Harischandra Ground, Anuradhapura - 26 February to 4 March 1983
4. 4th National Scout Jamboree, Welagedara Ground, Kurunegala, 1992
5. 5th National Scout Jamboree, Kandy, 1998
6. 6th National Scout Jamboree, Balapitiya, 2002
7. 7th National Scout Jamboree, Nuwara Eliya, 2006
8. 8th National Scout Jamboree, Angunakolapelessa, 26 to 31 December 2010
9. 9th National Scout Jamboree, Jaffna, 20 to 26 February 2016
10. 10th National Scout Jamboree 2024 Trincomalee, 20 to 26 February 2024

=== Notable Scouters ===
- Gerald Fernando served as the International Boy Scout Commissioner for the Far East in the 1950s until he died in 1961.
- Senator E. W. Kannangara served on the World Scout Committee of the World Organization of the Scout Movement from 1960 until 1961.
- In 1973, Kingsley C. Dassanaike was awarded the Bronze Wolf, the only distinction of the World Organization of the Scout Movement, awarded by the World Scout Committee for exceptional services to world Scouting.
- Janaprith Fernando was the first Sri Lankan elected to the World Scout Committee, the highest governing body of World Organization of the Scout Movement. He will serve as a member of this committee till 2020.

== Programme sections ==
The Programme Commissioner of the Sri Lanka Scout Association is Sarath Mataraarachchi (2019 - 2024)

- 5 Years 6 Months to 7 Years - Singithi Scouts
- 7 Years to 11 years - Cubs Scouts
- 10 Years and 6 Months to 14 Years and 6 Months - Junior Scout
- 14 Years 6 Months to 18 Years - Senior Scouts
- 17 Years and 6 Months to 24 Years - Rover Scout

== Rover Scouts ==
Youth between the ages of 17 and 26 years are eligible to be trained as Rover Scouts.

A Rover Scout working for the B.P. Award must maintain a Record Book (not his personal Log Book) from the date he was invested as a Rover Scout for a minimum of 2 years.

In the first half of the book, he will record every Crew Meeting he attended and every C-I-C he was present at. He will give the date of the meetings, their duration, and the important events of the programme. He should have attended a minimum of 24 Crew Meetings and 6 C-I-C meetings, to be eligible for the B.P. Award.

== Special sections ==
Air Scouting and Sea Scouting are different ways of delivering the programme, and are not separate organisations. They are based on the same fundamental Scouting Aims & Methods. Sea and Air Scouts follow the core balanced programme for their section but usually add a nautical or aeronautical twist to the programme and activities.

=== Sea Scouting ===
Sea Scouts in Sri Lanka was originally established in 1932. Sri Lanka Scout Association is about to officially relaunch the Sea Scouts. The Sri Lanka Navy would be providing all the technical facilities and some of the training. Captain Suresh De Silva a former President's Scout, who is now the Headquarters Commissioner for Sea Scouts is in charge of the operations. There was already a two-day orientation course for prospective Leaders and a one-day practical course for the Scouts.

=== Air Scouting ===
Sri Lanka Air Force is the pioneer of Air Scouting in Sri Lanka. The First Air Scout Troop 57th Colombo was started in 1972 by Sri Lanka Air Force with the direction of the Commander of the Air Force Air Chief Marshal Padi Mendis and first Group Scout Leader Wing Commander PT Silva. At present Sri Lanka Air Force Air Scout group has more than 1,500 Air Scouts organised in 10 Air Scouts Troops. The First Sri Lanka Air Rover crew started in 2017 with 15 Air Rovers at Sri Lanka Air Force Base Rathmalana.

Air Scouts are being trained in aviation and flying-based activities with the support of the Sri Lanka Air Force. In addition, Air Scouts follow the same Scouting activities and badge schemes as normal Scouts, Further, Air Scouts undergo aeronautical and technical training in aircraft, Design Model Aircraft, Design UAVs, Design quadrocopters, Air Cargo Operation, Aircraft under wing operation and Airport management. Air Scouts have different uniforms from Air Scouts in other countries.

There are claims that Major Baden Fletcher Smyth Baden–Powell, youngest brother of the founder of BP, Late Lieutenant General Robert Baden–Powell and an aviator, first brought flying-based activities into Scouting. However, as late as July 1932, Baden Baden-Powell wrote:

"…it has been suggested that Air Scouts should be organized in the same way as Sea Scouts."

- Chairman of Sri Lanka Air Force Air Scouts - Group Captain Paminda Jayawardhana
- Deputy Chairman of Sri Lanka Air Force Air Scouts - Group Captain Sujeeva Ponnamperuma
- Secretary of Sri Lanka Air Force Air Scouts - Wing Commander Dr.Rajeev Pagoda

== Scout training camps ==
Pedro Scout Training Camp near Nuwara Eliya (6°57′48.68″N 80°48′23.49″E) is known for its tropical forests and hills.

Lee Dassanayake Scout Activity Center near Mirigama (7°17′21.69″N 80°8′35″E) is set in 12 acres of forest in the Gampaha District. The site offers camping facilities, woodland and campsite activities, hiking tracks and a large rally ground.

Lake View Park International Scout Centre in Kandy (7°15′7″N 80°38′58.83″E) is a 57-acre ground belonging to Dharmaraja College. The park is modelled after Gilwell Park in London. It consists of rally grounds, campsites, a campfire circle, the den, a kitchen complex, lecture rooms and dormitories. It is the home for the 1st Kandy Dharmaraja Scout Group.

== Structure ==
The Sri Lanka Scout Association is structured in seven Scouting provinces with 37 districts:

- Northern Province
- Central Province
- Eastern Province
- North Western Province
- Western Province
- Uva Province
- Sabaragamuwa Province
- Ampara
- Akkaraipaththu-Kalmunai
- Colombo
- Batticaloa
- Homagama
- Kankesanthurei
- Kurunagala
- Matale
- Negombo
- Nuwara Eliya
- Rathnapura
- Point-Pedro
- Anuradhapura
- Badulla
- Gampaha
- Hambantota
- Kandy
- Kegalle
- Matara
- Moratuwa-Piliyandala
- Mulativu
- Panadura-Horana
- Trincomalee
- Vavuniya
- Wenappuwa
- Avissawella
- Chilaw
- Galle
- Jaffna
- Kalutara
- Kilinochchi
- Monaragala
- Nawalapitiya
- Mannar
- Polonnaruwa
- Puththalam
- Waththala-Jaela

== Scouting Magazine Sri Lanka ==
Scouting Magazine Sri Lanka (Sinhala: බාලදක්ෂ ශ්‍රී ලංකා, Tamil: சாரணர்க் இலங்கை) is a publication of the Scouts Media Network of Sri Lanka. The target audience is members of both genders at all age levels. It carries news on Scouting events, articles on aspects of Scouting such as service, outdoor skills and activities, and features about Scouting activities. It has been in publication since 22 February 2012.

== See also ==
- The Sri Lanka Girl Guides Association
- World Buddhist Scout Brotherhood
- Lake View Park International Scout Centre
