= Kingsley C. Dassanaike =

Kingsley Clarence Dassanaike
- 1st Bronze Wolf in Sri Lanka
- Born: 19 June 1914; Moratuwa, Sri Lanka
- Other name: Dusty/Dassy

Kingsley Clarence Dassanaike (/dəsəˈnaɪəkə/ də-sə-NY-ə-kə Sinhala: කිංස්ලි ක්ලැරන්ස් දසනායක; Tamil: தசநாயக்க கிளாரென்ஸ் கிங்ஸ்லி; born 19 June 1914, date of death unknown), the first non-foreign Principal of the Ceylon School for the Deaf & Blind in Ratmalana, Sri Lanka was the inventor of the Sinhala Braille system, and served as the Chairman of the Extension Scout Committee for disabled Scouts of the World Organization of the Scout Movement as well as National Headquarters Commissioner, District Commissioner for Colombo of the Sri Lanka Scout Association from 1958 to 1963 and acting District Commissioner of Moratuwa–Piliyandala in the 1960s.

== Early life ==
Dassanaike was born in Moratuwa, Ceylon on 19 June 1914. He began Scouting as a Cub Scout at 15th Colombo at Mount Lavinia on 19 June 1919, under Charles P. Dharmakirti. During the course of his Scouting career he worked to promote Scouting for the deaf and blind alongside Edmund Godfrey-Faussett, Charles Dymoke Green Jr., E. W. Kannangara, and Yorihiro Matsudaira, who would later found the Nippon Agoonoree based on their work together. He participated and read papers at International Scout Conferences on the subject of disabled Scouting in New Delhi and Manila, visited Thailand, Kenya and Uganda to promote the subject, and had his greatest success in Hong Kong. At the 1947 6th World Scout Jamboree in France, he was in charge of the British Contingent of Handicapped Scouts. He was attached to Third Handicapped Group in Birmingham, while serving at the Boy Scouts International Bureau in London, and by the time of the 1957 9th World Scout Jamboree at Sutton Park, he served in a Special Committee attached to the International Advisory Bureau for Handicapped Scouts. Upon his return to Sri Lanka, he assisted in revising "Scouting for Boys" in the Sinhala language.

== Sinhala Braille system ==
In 1947, Dassanaike, principal of the school for the blind at Ratmalana, introduced a Sinhala Braille code influenced by the English Braille code. In 1952, a universally accepted Braille system was introduced by UNESCO. Further he was vice-president of the World Council for the Welfare of the Blind.

== Later life in Scouting ==
In 1972, he was awarded the 76th Bronze Wolf, the only distinction of the World Organization of the Scout Movement, awarded at the 24th World Scout Conference in Nairobi, Kenya by the World Scout Committee for exceptional services to world Scouting, the only Sri Lankan thus awarded to date.
