= Sonny Yatawara =

Sri Lankan cricketer and coach

Personal information
- Born: 1938; Ceylon (now Sri Lanka)
- Died: 2 September 2000 (aged 62)
- Bowling: Right arm fast medium
- Role: bowler

Domestic team information
- Years: Team
- Saracens Sports Club
- Singhalese Sports Club

Career statistics
Competition	FC
Matches	2
Runs scored	51
Batting average	25.50
100s/50s	0/0
Top score	47
Balls bowled	-
Wickets	2
Bowling average	53.30
5 wickets in innings	0
10 wickets in match	0
Best bowling	2/39
Catches/stumpings	2/-
- Source: Cricinfo, 13 December 2023

Sonny Yatawara (1938 – 2 September 2000) was a Sri Lankan first-class cricketer. He gained a reputation for his fiery temperament and for his never-say-die attitude among cricketing fraternity and social circles. He was regarded as one of the fastest bowlers in Sri Lanka during his playing career. He also worked at Ceylon Tobacco. He played two first-class matches between 1960/61 - 1961/62 domestic seasons playing for Saracens Sports Club and Singhalese Sports Club.

== Career ==
He had his first taste of playing cricket at school level when he was studying at Dharmaraja College. In the mid-1950s, he then switched to Ananda College to continue his prospects in cricket. In a school cricket match against St. Peter's College, Colombo, he was reported to have caused serious injury concerns to at least four schoolboy cricketers of St. Peter's College during bowling, and the players underwent treatment at the hospital.

He made his first-class debut in the 1960/61 season, playing for Ceylon in the M. J. Gopalan Trophy against Madras. His biggest scalp in his career came on 28 February 1961 when he clean bowled West Indies all-rounder Sir Garfield Sobers for a golden duck (off the first delivery faced by Sobers) in a friendly match at the Colombo Oval. The match was played between Daily Mirror XI and CCA, and other players included the West Indian Test players Rohan Kanhai, Wes Hall, Seymour Nurse, Chester Watson and Conrad Hunte.

After his playing career, he switched to a coaching career. He coached Dharmaraja College in 1962, and players of the caliber of T. B. Kehelgamuwa were groomed under his guidance. He also went onto coach St Thomas’ College, Matale, junior age group teams at Trinity College. He also had a coaching stint with Kandy Cricket Club.

== Death ==
He died at the age of 62 on 2 September 2000.
