= Francis George Stevens =

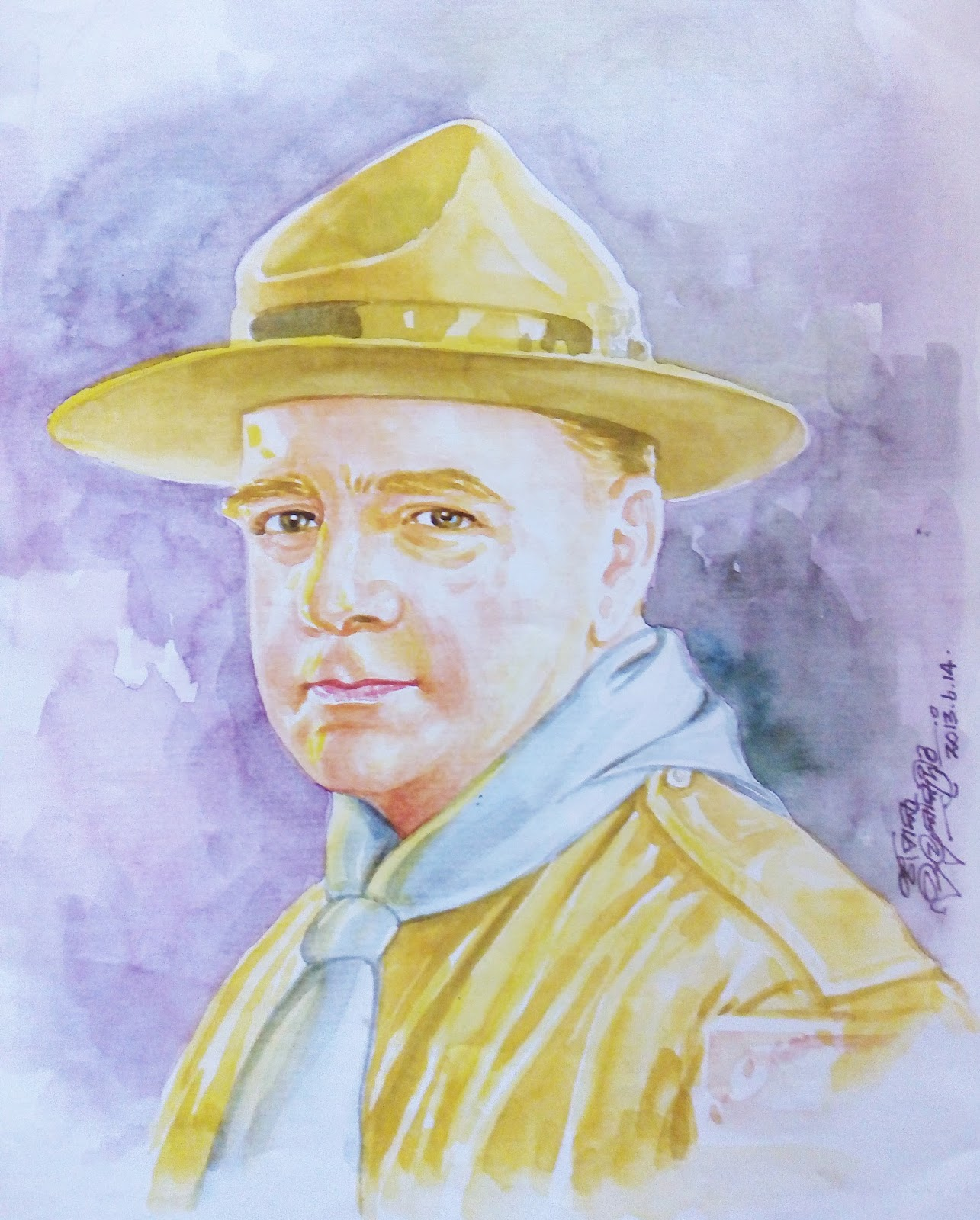
- Born: June 2, 1891; Tavistock, Devon, England
- Spouse: Gladys Crockwell
- Parent(s): Mr. and Mrs. Lambert Stevens
- Engineering career
- Institutions: Public Works Department
- Projects: Founded Scouting in Sri Lanka

Francis George Stevens (2 June 1891 in Tavistock, Devon, England – ?) was a British civil engineer who founded Scouting in Sri Lanka. In 1912, Stevens founded the first recorded Scout troop at Christ Church College, Matale. In 1914 he established the 1st Galle Mahinda Scout Group at Mahinda College, Galle. Following the appointment of Stevens as the colonial commissioner, the British Scout Association Ceylon Branch was recognized in 1914.

Stevens was born in 1891, son of Mr. and Mrs. Lambert Stevens of Liverpool.

Stevens arrived in Ceylon in 1911 as an Engineer in the Public Works Department. He was transferred from Matale to Colombo in 1914 and then served in the Royal Navy during World War I.

Stevens had no previous experience in Scouting, and there was very little literature on the subject, yet he realized the value of the program. Stevens was recognized in 1917 when Lord Baden-Powell awarded him the Silver Wolf on the eve of his departure to Egypt on War Service.

In 1919, Stevens married Miss Gladys Crockwell of Court Netherleigh, Torquay, and they returned to Ceylon in 1920.

In 1939 he returned to active Scouting and accepted the post of President and Chairman of the Association. He was given the rank of Honorary Chief Scout Commissioner.

He left Ceylon in 1945 to live in retirement in England and wrote a farewell: "... It is very gratifying to know that the troop is still carrying on and doing good work, I believe that the Boy Scouts will play an important part in the future development of Ceylon and I hope that the 1st Colombo will take an active part therein... To do this it is necessary that every Scout realize that his part in the work is important and see that he always does his best. My farewell message to the troop would therefore be that it should always set before its aim of "nothing but the best"."

The Chief Commissioner issued a directive creating Stevens Day as an event in the Scouting calendar, to be celebrated the second Saturday In June.
