= Edmund Godfrey-Faussett =

Brigadier-General Edmund Godfrey-Faussett CB CMG FSA
- Born: Edmund Godfrey Godfrey-Faussett; 25 August 1868; Canterbury, Kent, England
- Died: 29 May 1942 (aged 73); Hadlow Down, Kent, England
- Military career
- Allegiance: British
- Rank: Brigadier-General
- Unit: Royal Engineers
- Awards: 1914 Star with Clasps and Roses
- Other work: Author and vexillologist

Brigadier-General Edmund Godfrey Godfrey-Faussett CB CMG FSA (25 August 1868 – 29 May 1942) was a British Army officer with the Royal Engineers, a vexillologist and official of The Boy Scouts Association.

== Military career ==
Godfrey-Faussett was born in Canterbury, the son of the antiquary Thomas Godfrey Faussett.

He was commissioned into the Royal Engineers as a second lieutenant on 17 February 1888, was promoted to lieutenant on 17 February 1891, and to captain on 1 September 1898. He served in South Africa during the Second Boer War, attached to the Telegraph battalion, where he took part in the advance and Relief of Kimberley (October 1899 to February 1900), then served in the Orange Free State and the Transvaal Republic. Following the occupation of Transvaal, he was Director of Transvaal Telegraphs. For his services, he received the brevet rank of major on 29 November 1900. Following the end of the war in June 1902, he returned home with other men of his division on the SS Pinemore, arriving at Southampton in October that year to be posted at Aldershot.

He served with the original British Expeditionary Force in 1914 and earned the 1914 Star with Clasps and Roses, as well as the CMG in February 1915, was promoted to temporary brigadier general in May 1918, and retired from the army in 1922.

Godfrey-Faussett, a personal friend of Robert Baden-Powell, became The Boy Scouts Association's Commissioner for training leaders. He led The Boy Scouts Association contingent at the 4th World Scout Jamboree in Hungary. In the 1930s he wrote Flags: Their Design and Use. A Handbook For Scouts, Guides and Others. In the late 1940s and early 1950s, Kingsley C. Dassanaike worked to promote Scouting for the deaf and blind to Godfrey-Faussett.

In 1897, he married Mabel Gertrude Hemming, daughter of Sir Augustus Hemming, and they had a son and daughter. He died suddenly in 1942 at his home in Annes, Hadlow Down, Kent.
