= E. W. Kannangara =

Ceylonese civil servant and statesman

Edward Wilmot Kannangara
- Occupations: Civil servant and statesman
- Known for: Long career in the Ceylon Civil Service during which he served as a Permanent Secretary and as the Clerk of the State Council

Senator Edward Wilmot Kannangara, CBE (Sinhala: කන්නන්ගර; Tamil: கன்னங்கரா) (1894-19??) was a Ceylonese civil servant and statesman. He served as the Permanent Secretary to the Ministry of Health and Local Government and a member of the Senate of Ceylon.

== Civil service career ==
Kannangara graduated from the University of London with a Bachelor of Arts degree having read English, Latin, Greek, Pure and Applied Mathematics. He first taught at the Government Training College before sitting for the civil service entrance exam with his friend Paikiasothy Saravanamuttu. He was appointed to the Ceylon Civil Service as a cadet in August 1919 along with Saravanamuttu, R. S. V. Poulier, T. D. Perera.

Kannangara served is cadetship in the Kachcheri in Kandy and Batticaloa. He then served as an additional police magistrate in Negombo and Avissawella. He was promoted to police magistrate of Avissawella in 1923 and served as police magistrate of Jaffan and Balapitiya. He served as the Clerk of the State Council from 1933 to 1940 and thereafter as Commissioner for Local Government and Secretary to the Minister for Local Administration, S. W. R. D. Bandaranaike. He served in the War Savings Advisory Committee. He was thereafter the Permanent Secretary to the Ministry of Health and Local Government until his retirement. He was a member of the Commission of Inquiry appointed by the Governor General to inquire into Local Government headed by N. K. Choksy, QC.

== Later life ==
He was elected to the Senate of Ceylon, serving from 1954 to 1959. He was the treasure of the Young Men's Christian Association, Colombo and member of the British And Foreign Bible Society (Ceylon Auxiliary) and the Royal Asiatic Society (Ceylon Branch).

=== Boy Scouts movement ===
He also served as Chief Commissioner of Boy Scouts of Ceylon in 1954, and served on the World Scout Committee of the World Organization of the Scout Movement from 1960 until 1961. Kingsley C. Dassanaike worked to promote Scouting for the deaf and blind with his support. Kannangara participated the 11th World Scout Jamboree, Marathon Greece 1963 as a Contingent Leader from Ceylon.

== Honors ==
He was appointed an Officer of the Order of the British Empire (OBE) in 1941 and a Commander of the Order of the British Empire (CBE) in the 1952 Birthday Honours.

== Family ==
His daughter Manel Abeysekera became the first Sri Lankan female diplomat.
