= T. B. Kehelgamuwa =

Sri Lankan cricketer and manager

T.B. Kehelgamuwa
Personal information
- Full name: Dissanayake Mudiyanselage Tikiri Banda Kehelgamuwa
- Born: 9 December 1942 (age 83); Gampola, Sri Lanka
- Nickname: Kehel
- Batting: Right-handed
- Bowling: Right-arm fast-medium

Career statistics
Competition	First class
Matches	16
Runs scored	266
Batting average	12.66
100s/50s	0/0
Top score	31*
Balls bowled	2,364
Wickets	55
Bowling average	18.96
5 wickets in innings	2
10 wickets in match	0
Best bowling	5/18
Catches/stumpings	4/–
- Source: Cricinfo, 29 March 2009

Dissanayake Mudiyanselage Tikiri Banda Kehelgamuwa (born 10 December 1942) is a former Sri Lankan cricketer and manager of the Sri Lanka national cricket team, under whose tenure the Sri Lanka Test team recorded their first overseas Test victory in 1995. He was a player from 1967 to 1974, and is considered one of the best pacemen Sri Lanka has ever had.

In September 2018, Kehelgamuwa was one of 49 former Sri Lankan cricketers felicitated by Sri Lanka Cricket, to honour them for their services before Sri Lanka became a full member of the International Cricket Council (ICC).

== Early life ==
Tikiri Banda Kehelgamuwa was born on 10 December 1942 at Gampola. He began schooling at the Wahalgoda Central College, Gampola, where his father was the Principal. In 1955, he enrolled at Dharmaraja College, where he excelled as an outstanding schoolboy cricketer in the early 1960s. He also represented Dharmaraja in athletics, hockey and soccer.

Kehel was coached by D. M. Dharamatillake, Arthur Alwis and Sonny Yatawara, when he was playing for Dharmaraja. He captained the first XI team in 1960–1961 and was selected the Best Bowler in the island in the "Daily News Schoolboy Cricketer" Contest. Kehelgamuwa won the much coveted Best Schoolboy Bowler award in 1961 and 1962.

While playing for his school team, he was selected to tour India with the Sri Lanka schools team in 1961. He tore apart the South Zone Schools team, taking 8 wickets for 8 runs, with all of his victims clean bowled (9.4–5–8–8). In 1961 he had the proud distinction of representing Sri Lanka in the Gopalan Trophy match under the captaincy of C. I. Gunesekera and later under Michael Tissera.

== Police career ==
Kehelgamuwa joined the Ceylon Police Force in 1963, as a Sup-Inspector of Police and served till his retirement in 2002 as a Deputy Inspector General of Police. He also represented the Police Sports Club at the Government Services Cricket Championships for several years. During his service, he was assigned as personal bodyguard of the former Governor-General, William Gopallawa.

== Kehel the cricketer ==
Kehelgamuwa had the distinction of being a member of the Sri Lanka team that beat the MCC for the first time in 1969 in a limited-overs game. He was a member of the Ceylon Government Services Team that toured India in 1972 to play in the Sheesh Mahal Trophy. The CGS team was beaten in the final, but "Kehel" captured 15 wickets in the tournament with an average of 12.30.

Major teams he represented are Ceylon, Nomads Sports Club, Nondescripts Cricket Club and Police Sports Club. During the 1961–1974 Sara Trophy seasons, Kehelgamuwa scored over 1,000 runs and captured over 500 wickets. He played a large part in helping the Nomads Sports Club to win the Sara Trophy in 1965. During Sri Lanka's tour of Pakistan in 1972, he was the only player to be selected from a Division III side (playing for Police SC) to the national squad.

== Cricketing administration ==
Kehelgamuwa managed the Sri Lanka national cricket team on the New Zealand tour of 1995, when Sri Lanka recorded their first overseas victory.

Kehel had the unique distinction of being a selector for 10 years and was the Chairman of the Selection Committee of the Board of Control for Cricket in Sri Lanka in the last two years of his stewardship, 1999 and 2000.

== Personal life ==
While serving as an officer attached to the Panadura Police, Kehel married Hemamalee Wettasinghe, a schoolmistress at St. John's College Panadura in 1971. Their marriage resulted in three daughters, Sonali, Lasanda and Buddhika, who eventually graduated from universities in Kelaniya SL, El Paso USA and Colombo SL respectively.
