= Methodist College, Colombo =

Methodist College
- Colombo; Sri Lanka

Information
- Type: Private
- Motto: We Scatter Light
- Established: 1866
- Principal: Mrs. Devshani Samaranayake
- Faculty: 75
- Enrollment: 1800
- Colours: Green and White
- Affiliation: Methodist Church
- Website: methodistcollege.lk

Methodist College, founded in 1866 is a girls school in Colombo, managed by the Methodist Church in Sri Lanka.

Leading number one girls schools in Sri Lanka.

The school currently maintains a student body of 1800 and approximately 75 teachers. The institution conducts 3 streams of classes in Sinhala, Tamil and English with English as a second language.

== History ==
In 1866, Miss Catherine Scott, a British missionary came to Sri Lanka (then known as Ceylon) and started the "Kollupitiya Girl's English School" in a large room with barely 40 girls. In 1883, when Miss Scott left, the school was registered as a "Grant-in-Aid" English high school with 99 students and renamed as "Kollupitiya Girls High School."

In 1915, the School was recognized as a fully organized Secondary School and its name was changed to Methodist College. In 1917, the 1st Colombo (Methodist College) Guide Company was founded by Ms. Choate and captained by Ms. Shire. In 1919 the Old Girls Association was established and this organization now has branches in London, Melbourne, Sydney, Toronto, Victoria and Southern California.

In 1930 the House system was introduced in the school with four houses Scott, Choate, Rigby and Restarick. During the 1950s, Framjee House (on Station Road) was bought by the School. The Junior Day Students moved in downstairs. During the mid 1950w, two new Houses were inaugurated – Park House and Shire House.

The Auditorium was declared open on June 24, 1988, by the Rev. Harold Fernando, President of the Methodist Conference.

== Houses ==
The student body is divided into six houses

Restarick House

- Colour - Red
- Motto - Utmost for the highest

Shire House

- Colour - Purple
- Motto - Aim high and persevere

Rigby House

- Colour - Yellow
- Motto - Never say die

Scott House

- Colour - Orange
- Motto - Play the game

Park House

- Colour - Grey
- Motto - Unity is strength

Choate House

- Colour - Brown
- Motto - Knit together in love and service

== Notable alumni ==
Name	Year/degree	Notability	Reference
Manel Abeysekera		first female Sri Lankan career diplomat	
Michelle de Kretser		author	
Sangeetha Weeraratne		Sri Lankan Film Actress	
Yureni Noshika		Sri Lankan Film Actress & Model	
