= Manel Abeysekera =

Sri Lankan diplomat (1933–2026)

- මානෙල් අබේසේකර
- Born: 14 August 1933
- Died: 10 September 2026 (aged 93)
- Education: Methodist College, Colombo, Somerville College, Oxford, New Hall, Cambridge
- Occupation: Diplomat
- Known for: Sri Lankan Ambassador to Germany, Sri Lankan Ambassador to Thailand
- Spouse: Hector Abeysekera

Irangani Manel Abeysekera (Sinhala: මානෙල් අබේසේකර; 14 August 1933 – 10 September 2026) was a Sri Lankan diplomat. Having served as Sri Lankan Ambassador in Germany and Thailand, she was known as Sri Lanka's first woman career diplomat.

== Early life and education ==
Abeysekera was born to E. W. Kannangara, a prominent civil servant who had served as the Clerk of the State Council. Educated at Methodist College, Colombo, she read history at Somerville College, Oxford. After joining the Overseas Service she studied modern languages at New Hall, Cambridge.

She was an Honorary Fellow of Somerville College.

== Diplomatic career ==
After graduating from Oxford in 1957, she returned to Ceylon and applied to the newly formed Ceylon Overseas Service through the Ceylon Civil Service, having become only female in the batch of eight selected candidates. Having been appointed to the service as the first female recruit, she became the first female diplomat in Sri Lanka.

Having completed her modern languages training at Cambridge, she was made permanent in her appointment and took up the post of Third Secretary at the Ceylon's High Commission in London. Thereafter she was posted to Thailand as Charge d’ Affaires from 1970 to 1974. Returning to Sri Lanka in 1974 she took up the post of Chief of Protocol at the Ministry of External Affairs and Defence, where she played a major role in organizing the Non-Aligned Summit in 1976. During her tenure she wrote the Foreign Ministry Manual of Protocol Procedure. She then went on to serve as Sri Lankan Ambassador to Thailand, thereafter Director General - Press and Publicity Division of the Foreign Ministry and finally became Sri Lankan Ambassador to Germany, having accreditation to Austria and Switzerland. She retired from the Foreign Service in 1993.

Abeysekera worked as a Consultant (Foreign Service Training), Ministry of Foreign Affairs and was based at the Lakshman Kadirgamar Institute of International Relations and Strategic Studies and was also a Consultant on Gender and Development.

== Personal life and death ==
Manel Abeysekera was married to Hector Abeysekera, a United Nations diplomat. Manel Abeysekera died on 10 September 2026, at the age of 93.
