= Scouting and Guiding in Sri Lanka =

The Scout and Guide movement in Sri Lanka is served by the Sri Lanka Scout Association and the Sri Lanka Girl Guides Association.

== Sri Lanka Scout Association ==
The Sri Lanka Scout Association (Sinhala: ශ්‍රී ලංකා බාලදක්ෂ සංගමය; Tamil: இலங்கைச் சாரணர் சங்கம்), the national Scouting organization of Sri Lanka, was founded in 1912, and became a member of the World Organization of the Scout Movement in 1953. The coeducational Sri Lanka Scout Association has 36,297 members as of 2011.

== Sri Lanka Girl Guides Association ==
The Sri Lanka Girl Guides Association (SLGGA, Lanka Baladhakshika Samajaya) (In Sinhala: ශ්‍රී ලංකා බාළදක්ෂිකා සංගමය, in Tamil:இலங்கைப் மகளீர் சாரணர்க் கழகம்) is the national Guiding organization of Sri Lanka. It serves 37,057 members (as at 01/01/2007) (23,133 in 2003 and 16,656 in 1999). Founded in 1917, the girls-only organization became a full member of the World Association of Girl Guides and Girl Scouts in 1951.

== See also ==
- Lake View Park International Scout Centre
