= Janaprith Fernando =

Janaprith Salinda Fernando
- ජනප්‍රිත් සලින්ද ප්‍රනාන්දු

Chief Commissioner, Sri Lanka Scout Association
- In office 2021–2025

Janaprith Salinda Fernando (Sinhala: ජනප්‍රිත් සාලින්ද ප්‍රනාන්දු; Tamil: ஜனப்ரித் சாலிந்த பெர்னான்டோ 23 September 1967 in Ratmalana) of Colombo, Sri Lanka, served as the Chief Commissioner of the Sri Lanka Scout Association until January 2026, and as the President of the Colombo Law Society. He was the first Sri Lankan to be elected as a volunteer member of the Asia-Pacific Regional Scout Committee of the World Organization of the Scout Movement (WOSM) to serve from 2012 to 2018. He was also the first and only Sri Lankan to have served in the World Scout Committee, the World Organization of the Scout Movement's highest governing body. Fernando was elected for a four year term to this body in August 2017 by the 41st World Scout Conference, held in Baku, Azerbaijan.

Fernando graduated from S. Thomas' College, Mount Lavinia, studied at the Sri Lanka Law College where he was the President of the Law Students' Union in 1990, and is practicing as an attorney, representing many leading Business Enterprises, Governmental, Non -Governmental, INGOs and Mercantile Sector Organisations in Sri Lanka, including the Colombo Lotus Tower.

Janaprith serves in a number other roles including as the Chairman of Bookbridge Sri Lanka, President of the Centre for Leadership and Talent Development and has served in a number of boards of private and public institutions in Sri Lanka.

== Scouting life ==
Having joined the Scout Movement at the age of 11 years, Fernando achieved the President's Scout Award in 1984 and was the Scout Leader of 39th Colombo Scout Troop for over 10 years until taking up leadership roles in the Colombo District in 1994, including as the District Commissioner from 2005 to 2010.

While serving in multiple roles at the National-level of the Sri Lanka Scout Association, he was the first and only Sri Lankan to be elected as a Member of the Asia-Pacific Scout Region (World Organization of the Scout Movement) Committee from 2012-2017, and subsequently the World Scout Committee of the World Organization of the Scout Movement from 2017 till 2021.

Fernando simultaneously served as the Deputy Chief Commissioner of the Sri Lanka Scout Association from 2016 to 2021, before being appointed the 21st Chief Commissioner of the Association.

In December 2025, Fernando's outstanding contributions to Scouting at the National, Regional, and World levels was recognised by the conferring of the highest award, the Silver Elephant Award, of the Bharat Scouts and Guides at the Raj Bhawan in Lucknow, Uttar Pradesh, India by Governor Anandiben Patel.

Furthermore, he was appointed as the Chairman of the Volunteer Support Sub Committee of the Asia-Pacific Scout Region (World Organization of the Scout Movement) and as the Membership Director of the Asia Pacific Evergreen Scouts in November 2025, and continues to serve in these roles. Fernando was also reappointed as a Consultant of the World Organization of the Scout Movement for a further triennium in 2025.

== Professional life ==
In addition to his voluntary service to Scouting and multiple other organisations, Fernando is a practicing attorney of the Supreme Court of Sri Lanka by profession. Following his education at the Sri Lanka Law College, Janaprith was called to the bar in 1992.

He Chaired the National Law Conference of the Bar Association of Sri Lanka in 2023. Fernando currently operates his own chamber and acts as legal counsel for a number of leading Business Enterprises, Governmental, Non -Governmental, INGOs and Mercantile Sector Organisations in Sri Lanka.
