= Christ Church College, Matale =

Christ Church College
- ක්‍රිස්තුදේව ජාතික

Location
- Kachcheri Road; Matale, Central province, 21000; Sri Lanka
- Coordinates: 7.467668°N 80.619760°E

Information
- School type: State school
- Motto: Latin: Fide et Amore (Fidelity and Love)
- Religious affiliation: Christianity
- Established: 1864; 162 years ago
- Founder: Church of Ceylon, Anglican.
- Principal: Athula Sahampath
- Gender: Mixed
- Classes: Grade 1 to 13
- Language: Sinhalese, English
- Houses: Amarasekara; Derick; Kingsley; Perimpanayagam
- Colors: Green and white

Christ Church College, Matale (Sinhala: ක්‍රිස්තුදේව ජාතික) is a mixed state school in Matale, Sri Lanka.

== History ==
The college was established in 1864, as the Christ Church Boys' English Elementary School, in the garden of Lady Sophie McCarthy, by the church missionaries of the Kurunegala Diocese. The first Sri Lankan Scout troop was established at the school by a British Highways Engineer, Francis George Stevens, in 1912.

== Notable alumni ==
- Don Stephen Senanayake - Prime Minister of Sri Lanka (1947–1952)
- William Gopallawa - President of Sri Lanka (1972–1978)
- Richard Aluwihare - Inspector-General of Police (1947–1955)
- Prabath Jayasuriya - ODI cricketer

== Principals ==
- Athula Sahampath
- Dulani Samarakoon
- T. W. Mediwake
- Dharmasiri Pandigama
- Lester P. Ranathunga
- Fonseka
- Mahathmaluwa

== See also ==
- List of schools in Sri Lanka
