= Lake View Park International Scout Centre =

- Owner: 1st Kandy Dharmaraja Scout Group
- Location: Kandy
- Country: Sri Lanka
- Coordinates: 7°17′18.8268″N 80°39′05.6232″E
- Website lakeviewscouts.com

Lake View Park International Scout Centre (Sinhala language: ලේක්විව්පාක් ජාත්‍යන්තර බාලදක්ෂ මූලස්ථානය.) is a scout campsite, Scout Activity Centre, training and conference centre for Scouting groups, which belongs to the 1st Kandy Dharmaraja Scout Group. This 57-acre site is located in Kandy, Sri Lanka.

Lake View Park International Scout Centre is modeled on the Gilwell Park in London, and consists of rally grounds, campsites, a campfire circle, the den, kitchen complex, lecture rooms and dormitories.

The 57-acre tract of land, belonging to Dharmaraja College, was allocated for the scout group by P. de Kularatne, the college principal, in 1924. The founder of the Scout Movement, Robert Baden-Powell, visited the site twice during the 1920s. In 1984, the scout centre was named as the Lake View Park International Scout Centre, and its highest point was named Baden Powell hill to mark the historical visit of Baden-Powell.

Parallel to the RISGO – Centenary celebration of the 1st Kandy Dharmaraja Scout Group, Lakeview Park International Scout Center was renovated with several new constructions. A memorial statue of J.H. De Saram – founder of the 1st Kandy Dharmaraja Scout Group – was unveiled on 18 February 2013, at the RISGO by his son J.H. De Saram, Jr.

The center is located in a summit which is approximately 2.5 km away from the heart of Kandy Town. This is surrounded by other mountains like Knuckles Mountain Range, Hanthana Mountain Range, Hunnasgiriya and Alagalla and provides a panoramic view of the surroundings, including Temple of the Tooth and Kandy Lake.

Lake View Park International Scout Centre consists of rally grounds, camp sites, campfire circle, the den, kitchen complex, lecture rooms and dormitories.

== 1st Kandy Dharmaraja Scout Group ==
1st Kandy Dharmaraja Scout Group
- Headquarters: Lake View Park International Scout Centre
- Country: Sri Lanka
- Founded: 1913
- Founder: J. H. de Seram
- Membership: 1,297

Lake View Park International Scout Centre is owned 1st Kandy Dharmaraja Scout Group (Sinhala: පළමුවන මහනුවර ධර්මරාජ බාලදක්ෂ සමූහය) is the Scout Group of Dharmaraja College, Kandy, Sri Lanka. It is known to be the oldest continuous scout group in the Sri Lanka Scout Association.

=== History ===
In 1913, six years after Robert Baden-Powell introduced scouting to the world, scouting arrived at Dharmaraja College. The 1st Kandy Dharmaraja Scout Group is the second Scout Troop in Ceylon and the 1st group in Kandy District founded by late Mr. John Henry De Saram under the Principalship of late Mr.K.F. Billimoria.

1st Kandy Dharmaraja Scouts had the rare opportunity to honour the founder, Lord Baden Powell when he paid a visit to Dharmaraja College in 1921. Dharmaraja scouts had felicitated the founder on three different occasions when he visited Sri Lanka.

As part of centenary celebration, 1st Kandy Dharmaraja Scout group established a Guinness world record by creating the world largest neckerchief measures 53.7 m x 37.1 m x 37.1 m (176 ft 2.4 in x 121 ft 8.4 in x 121 ft 8.4 in) and the largest woggle measures 1.03 m (3 ft 4.55 in) in diameter and 1 m (3 ft 3.37 in) in height on 20 February 2014.

=== Group Scout Leaders ===
- 1913 – 1931 Mr. J.H.De Seram
- 1931 – 1934 Mr. J.N.Thomas
- 1934 – 1967 Mr. B.A.S.Wimalachandra
- 1967 – 1970 Mr. S.Rajakaruna
- 1970 – 1978 Mr. B.N.B.Dolapihilla
- 1978 – 1993 Mr. M.B.Weerasekara
- 1993 – 2007 Mr. S.K.P.Mataraarachchi
- 2007 – 2008 Mr. S.M.Keerthiratne
- 2008 – 2009 Mr. S.K.B.Weerakoon
- 2009 – 2015 Mr. M.Wijesiriwardhane
- 2015 – 2017 Mr. R.M.S.Rathnayake
- 2017 – 2019 Mr. I.B.Pulasinghe
- 2019 – 2023
- 2023 – Present Mr. R.M.S.Rathnayake

=== International Expeditions ===
Dharmaraja scouts climbed the Himalaya mountains seven times from 1985 to 2007.

In 2017, team of 12 scouts from Dhramraja Scout Group conquered the K2, the second highest peak in the world at 8,611 m (28,251 ft). This is the first time that a Sri Lankan Scout Group takes part in climbing the K2.

=== Awards and recognition ===
The 1st Kandy Dharmaraja Scout Group's very first great achievement, the "King's Flag" which they won for three consecutive years, that is in 1917, 1918 and 1919. This flag was traditionally awarded to a troop in the British Colonies that had the largest number of King Scouts on 30 September in each year. In those years the number of colonies in the British Empire was quite a considerable number and no other troop in the Colonies could emulate that achievement.

From 1993 up to 2006, Dharmaraja Scouts won the Island Merit Flag for being the Best Scout Group in Sri Lanka, consecutively.

== Old Rajans Scout Association ==
Old Rajans Scout Association
- Headquarters: Lake View Park International Scout Centre
- Country: Sri Lanka
- Founded: 12 November 1978
- Website www.oldrajansscouts.org

Events at Lake View Park International Scout Centre are supported by the Old Rajans Scout Association (Sinhala: 'ධර්මරාජ ආදි බාලදක්ෂ සංගමය) (or ORSA). This is an organization consisting of past scouts of the 1st Kandy Dharmaraja Scout Group (Sinhala: 'පලවන මහනුවර ධර්මරාජ බාලදක්ෂ සමූහය) of Dharmaraja College (Sinhala: 'ධර්මරාජ විද්‍යාලය), Kandy, Sri Lanka. It was the first old scout association in Sri Lanka founded on 12 November 1978 at Lake View Park International Scout Centre. The ORSA was founded by late Mr. Saliya Rajakaruna, Mr. Shantha Madurawa and late Mr. V.K. Angammana as president, secretary and treasurer respectively under the principalship of Mr. A.P. Gunarathna and the guidance of then Group Scout Master of 1st Kandy Dharmaraja Scout Group Mr. M.B. Weerasekara.

The primary objective of the association is to maintain strong ties with the 1st Kandy Dharmaraja Scout Group and work towards the betterment of Scouting at Dharmaraja College. ORSA has contributed to develop and maintain the Lake View Park International Scout Centre, and to organise a series of international scout Jamborees as part of its contribution to the scouts around the globe.

Full membership is only awarded to the past scouts of 1st Kandy Dharmaraja Scout Group who have achieved the 1st Class Scout badge.

== International Events ==
Together with 1st Kandy Dharmaraja Scout Group, the association has successfully organized seven international scouting events including Jamboree (Scouting), JIMs, Adventure Programs.

=== Dharmaraja Centenary JIM 1987 ===
When Dharmaraja College celebrated the Centenary year in 1987 (1887–1987), 1st Kandy Dharmaraja Scout Group and the Old Rajans Scout Association organized the Dharmaraja Centenary JIM 1987 from 18 to 22 February 1987. It was also the 75th Anniversary of the Sri Lanka Scout Association. It consisted of Cub Scouts, Scouts, Rovers and Scout Leaders totalling to 1000, which makes it one of the largest in the whole world.

Then President of Sri Lanka Mr. J. R. Jayewardene was the chief guest at the ‘Centenary JIM’, who also paid tribute to the then principal A. P. Gunaratna and then Group Scout Leader Bandara Weerasekera and the organizers for conducting a Jamboree of exceptional standard.

The name JIM stands for Jamboree Indaba Moot.

Jamboree
Jamboree was a name given by Baden Powell to the first International gathering of Scouts at Olympia, London, in 1920. When asked, "Why Jamboree?" Baden Powell replied: "What else would you call it?"

Indaba
a Zulu word, means gathering of chiefs The first World Scout Indaba was held at Gilwell Park, in Essex, the training ground for Scout Leaders, in 1952.

Moot
Moot was again suggested by Baden Powell as a gathering for Rover Scouts. It comes from the old English meaning gathering of young men for discussion concerning the affairs of the community.

=== DESAI Jamborette 1994 ===
1st Kandy Dharmaraja Scout Group celebrated 80 years of scouting with DESAI (Dharmaraja 80th Scout Anniversary International) Jamborette from 18 to 22 February 1994. DESAI organized jointly by the 1st Kandy Dharmaraja Scout Group and Old Rajans Scout Association.

=== Rajans Venture '97 ===
Dharmaraja College celebrated its 110th anniversary in 1997 by organizing a series of events. As part of that, 1st Kandy Dharmaraja Scout Group and Old Rajans Scout Association jointly organized the "Rajans Venture '97" from 18 to 22 February 1997. It was the first adventure program to be held in Sri Lanka with, Water Activities, Hiking, and Ground Activities.

=== Rajans Millennium Jamboree 2000 ===
1st Kandy Dharamaraja Scout Group together with Old Rajans Scout Association organized the Rajans Millennium Jamboree from 18 to 22 February 2000, to commemorate the dawn of the new millennium and to celebrate the winning of Island Merit flag for best Scout Group in Sri Lanka for consecutive years from 1996.

=== Rajans JIM 2003 ===
The year 2003 marked the 90 years of scouting at 1st Kandy Dharmaraja Scout Group. To celebrate the 90 years, 1st Kandy Dharmaraja Scout Group and Old Rajans Scout Association jointly organized the "Rajans JIM 2003" from 14 to 20 August 2003. This was the 5th International Scout Program to be organized and held at the Lake View Park International Scout Centre.

=== RANSAI 2008 ===
1st Kandy Dharmaraja Scout Group celebrated its 95th anniversary in 2008 by organizing an adventure and leadership program named "RANSAI - RAjans Nintyfifth Scout Anniversary International - 2008" from 26 to 30 December 2008.

=== RISGO Centennial 2013 ===
RISGO CENTENNIAL (Rajans International Scout Gathering Of Centennial ) 2013 (Sinhala: 'රිස්ගෝ – සියවස් සැමරුම් ජාත්යන්තර බාලදක්ෂ එකමුතුව), was an International Scout Jamboree to mark the Centenary Celebrations of 1st Kandy Dharmaraja Scout Group (1913–2013) of Dharmaraja College, Kandy, Sri Lanka from 18 to 22 February 2013.

The event included many scouting activities, and was open to all members of the World Organization of the Scout Movement (WOSM). This include Cub Scouts, Scouts, Rovers, Girl Scouts and Girl Guides, Leaders and Old Scouts from all around the world. It was organized as a joint venture by 1st Kandy Dharmaraja Scout Group & Old Rajans Scouts Association. The Chief Scout, the Hon. Mahinda Rajapaksa, (President of Sri Lanka) attended.

== Gallery of Lake View Park International Scout Centre ==
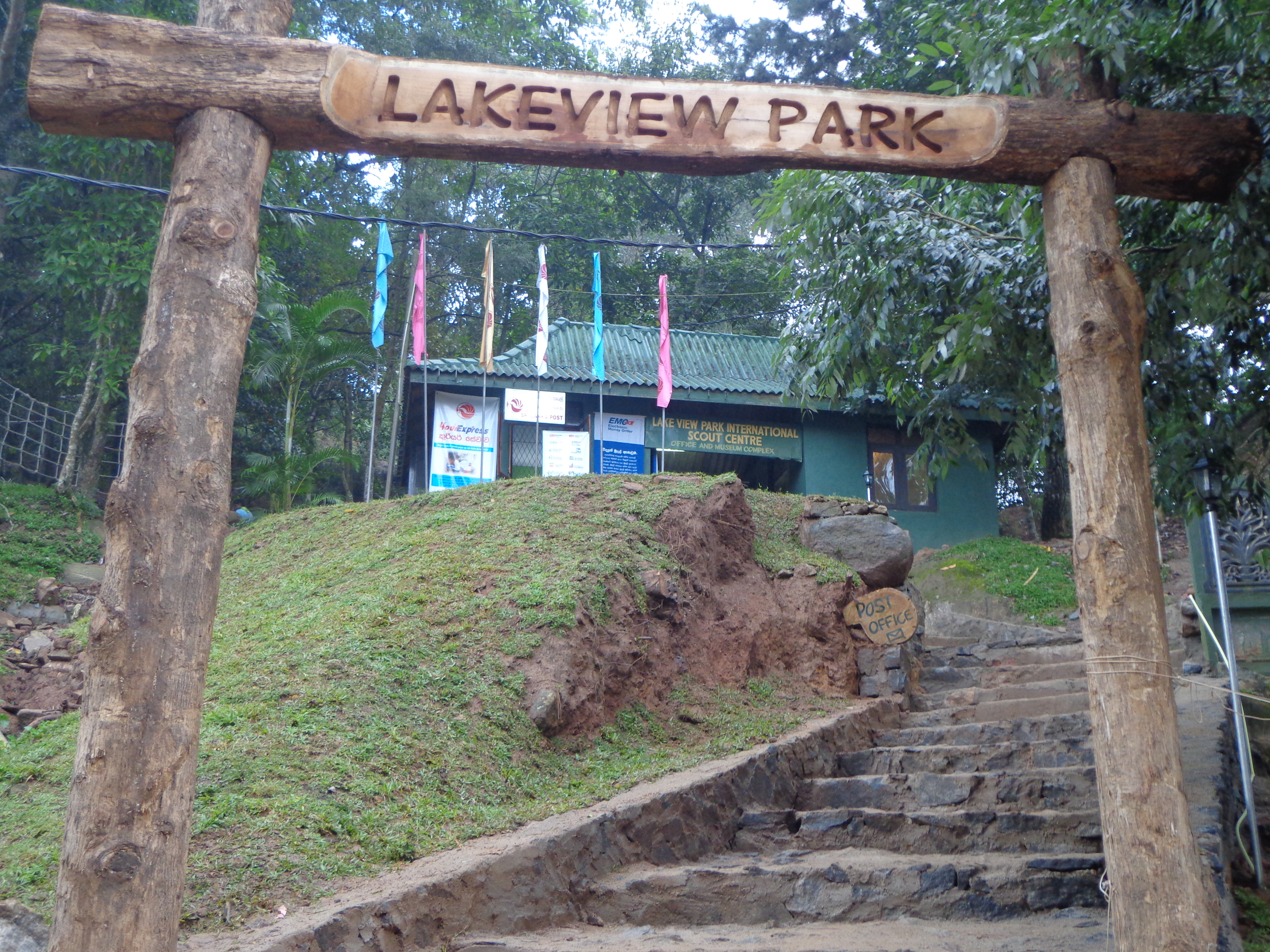
Entrance to the Centre

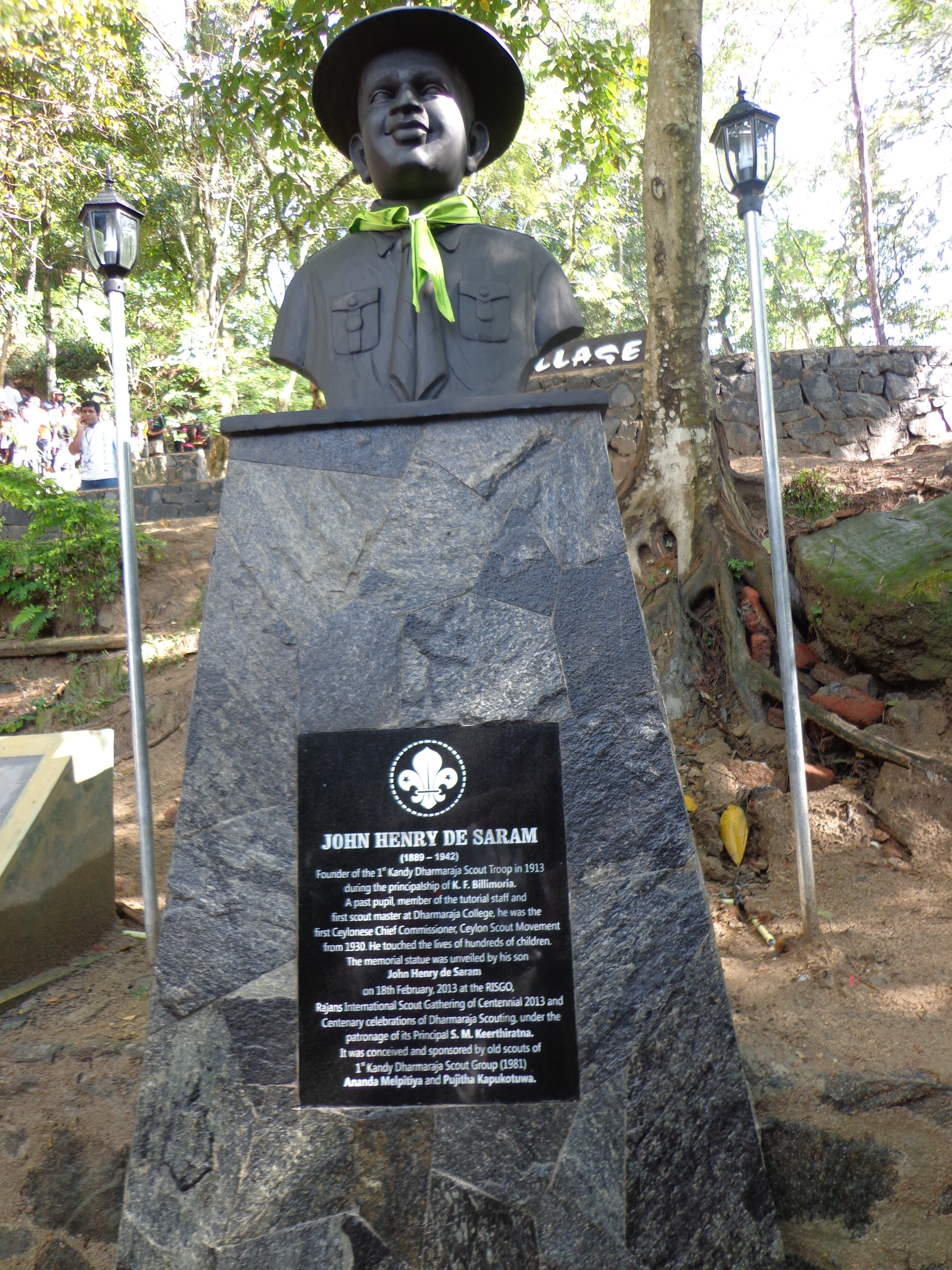
Statue of J.F.De Seram

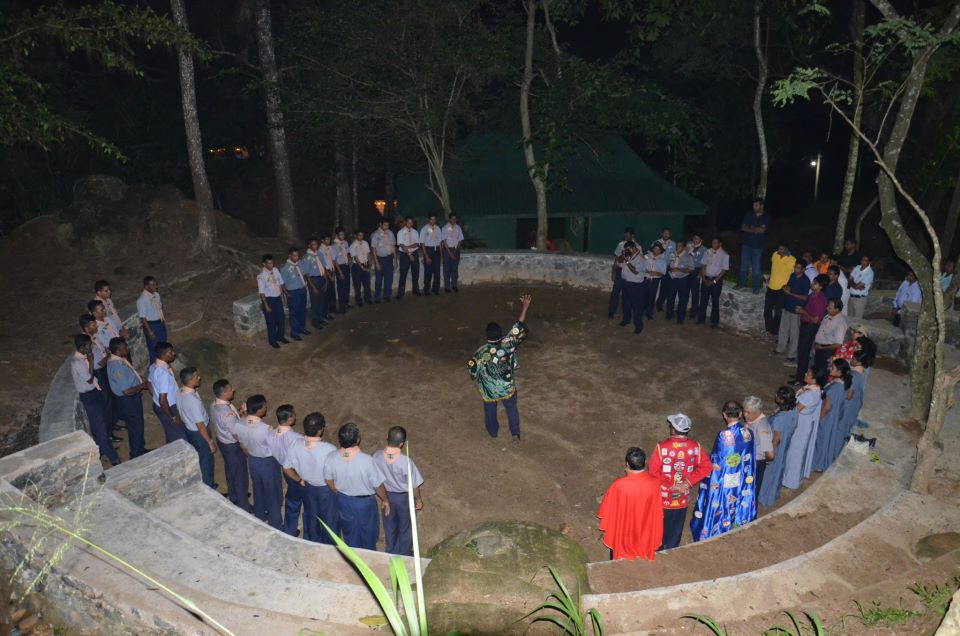
Camp fire circle

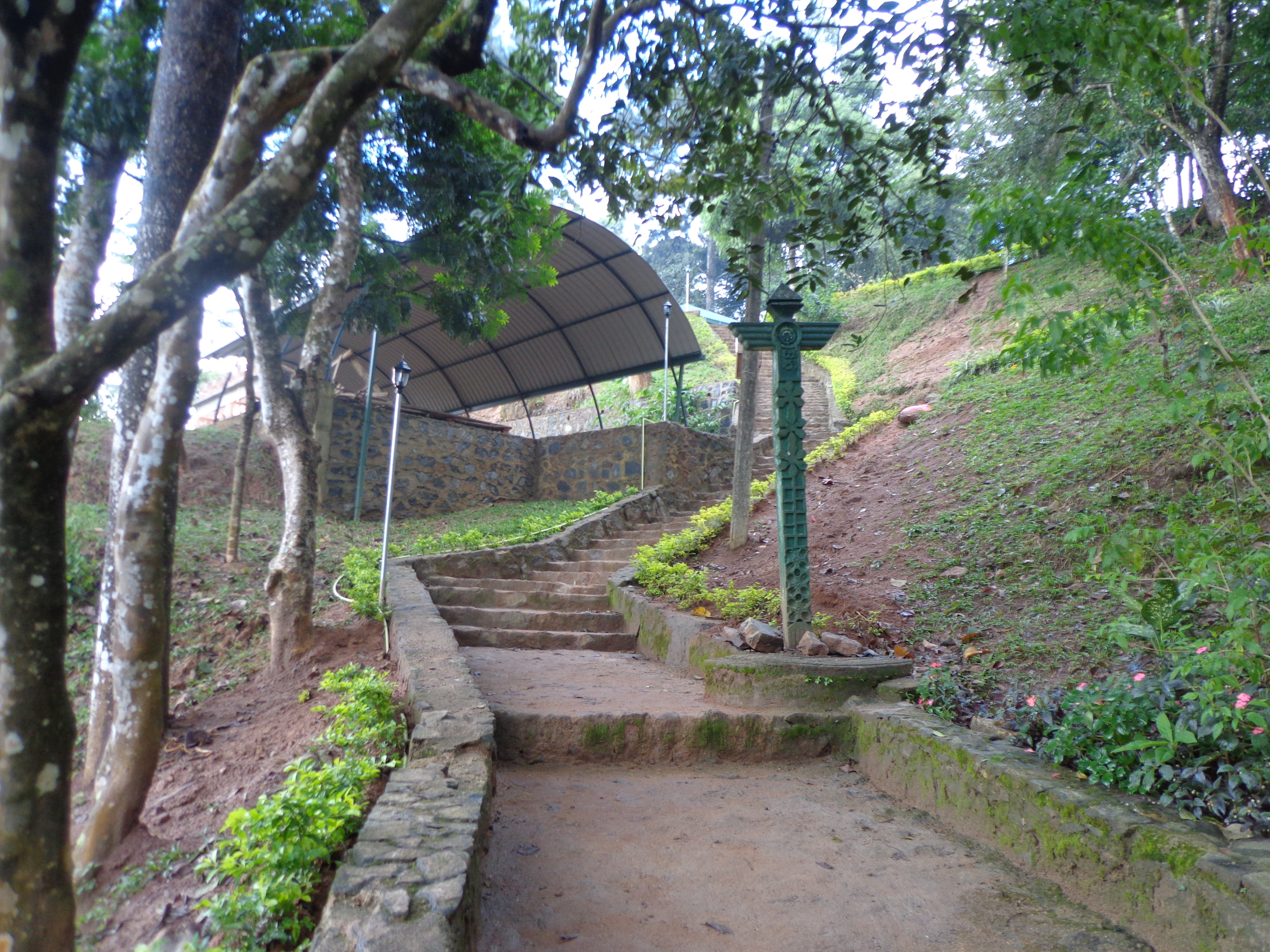
Pathways & Open Kitchen

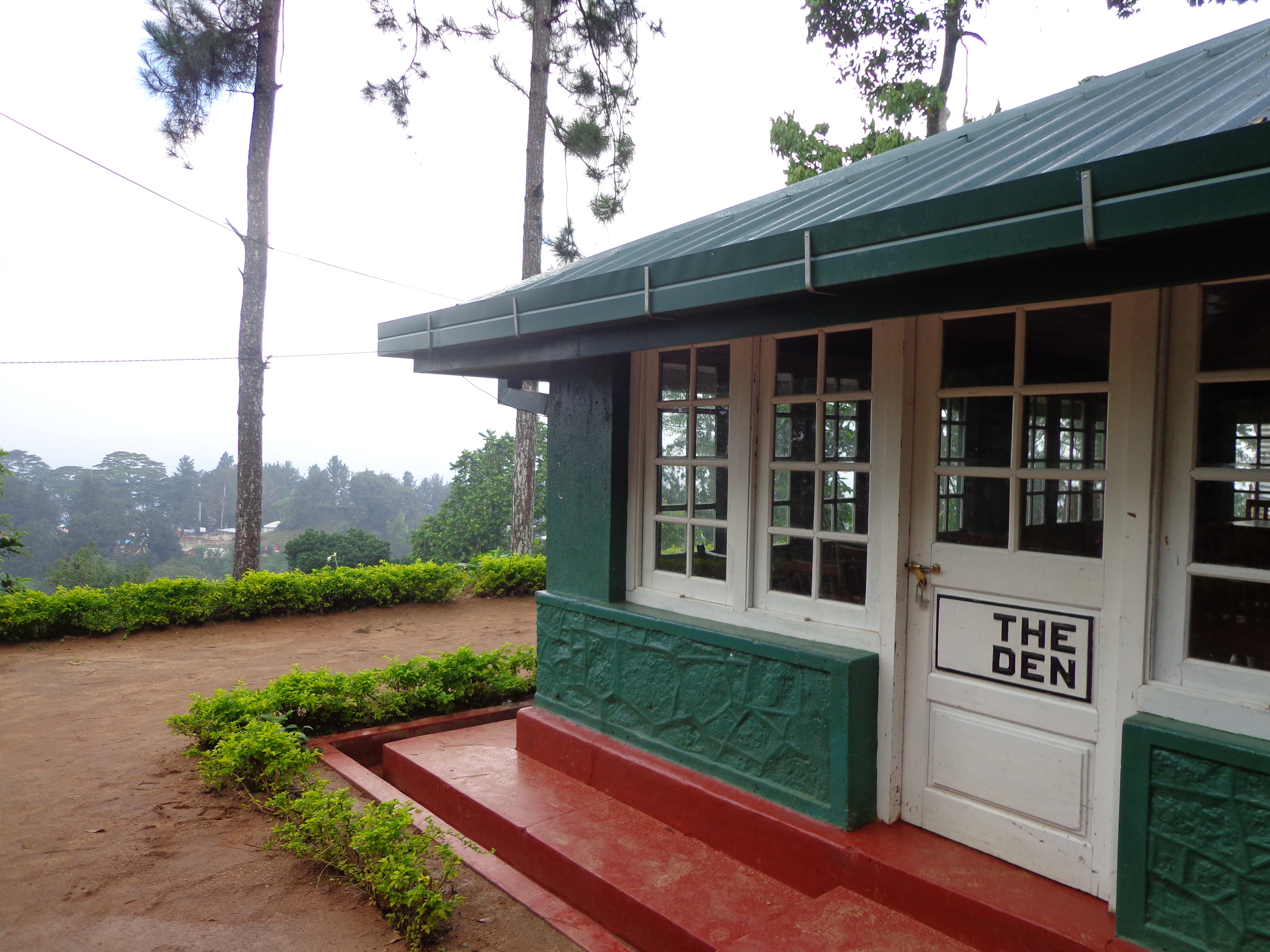
Den Cabin

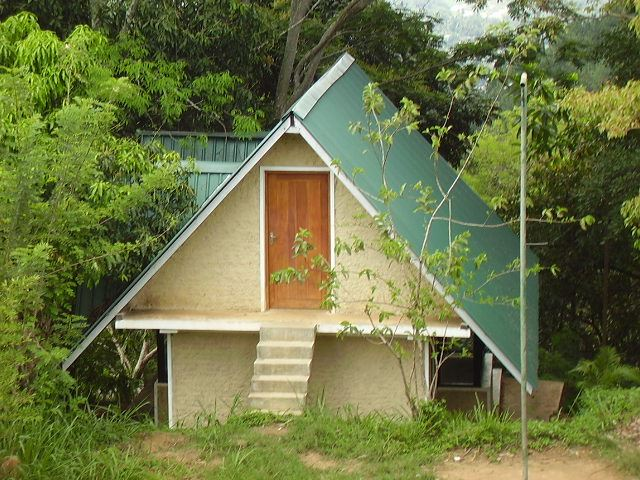
Wimalachandra Cabin

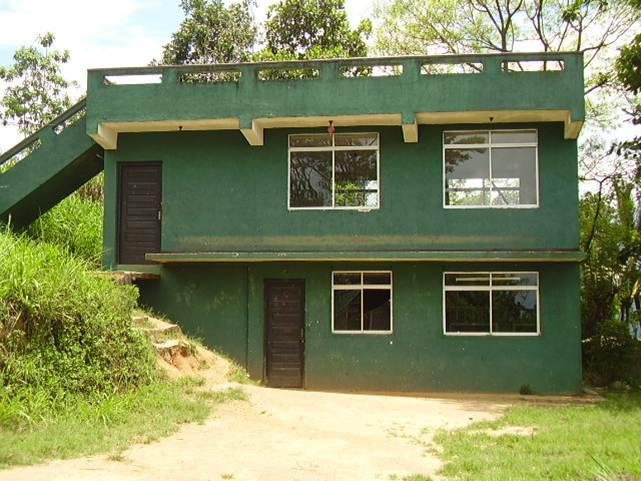
Gunarathna Cabin

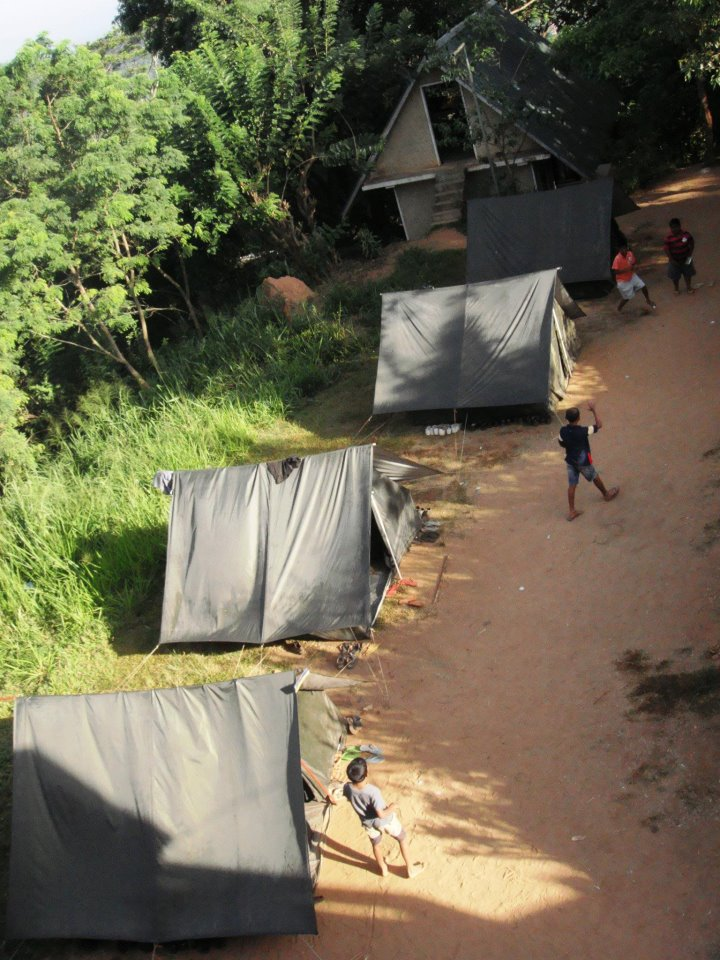
Camp Sites

== Other ==
Old Rajans Scout Association have organized scout development programs throughout its history with 1st Kandy Dharmaraja Scout Group. These events include many programs to benefiting different section of scouting community in Sri Lanka.

=== CENRAC 2017 ===
CENtenary of RAjan Cubs 2017 is the cub scouts activity camp held on 7–8 October 2017 to celebrate centenary cub scouting at 1st Kandy Scout group. 1300 cub scouts representing 25 scout districts spent two days at the Lake View Park International Scout Centre and experienced more than 30 special activities and enjoyed other events specifically organized for cubs scouts aged 7 to 10. Mr. Meril Gunathilake, incumbent Chief Scout Commissioner of Sri Lanka Scout Association declared opened the CENRAC on a colorful opening ceremony while, General Officer Commanding of 11th Division of Sri Lanka Army, Major General Nishshanka Ranawana graced the closing ceremony as the chief guest of the two day event.

During the closing ceremony, the Old Rajans Scout Association declared former Group Scout Master Mr. Bandara Weerasekara as the "Impeza of the Lakeview" in honor of his 50 years continues scout service.

== See also ==
- Dharmaraja College
- Sri Lanka Scout Association
