= Agoonoree =

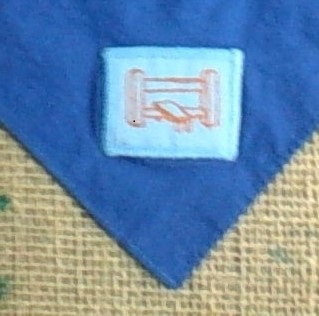
- Neckerchief of the Seven Counties Agoonoree Scout Camp, from the Home Counties of England. The Agoonoree stile emblem represents a means of overcoming barriers.
- Frequency: Every four years
- Status: Active
- Theme: Scouting jamboree for young people with special needs
- Date: August 8 to August 20, 1973
Previous; August 12 to August 16, 2016	Next; August 2020 (6 years ago)

Agoonoree is a Scouting jamboree for young people with disabilities.

== History ==
In 1949, Netherlands Scouts organised an international camp at Lunteren for Scouts with disabilities called "Agoon", after the Greek language word agṓn (ἀγών) meaning a gathering or competition. Further international Agoon camps were held in Belgium in 1953 and at Gilwell Park in the United Kingdom in 1958. The success of these events prompted the establishment of "Agoonoree" (a compound word of Agoon plus jamboree) camps at national or regional level in several countries.

== Australia ==
The first Queensland Agoonoree was held in 1980, following a visit by leaders to the 3rd Nippon Agoonoree in the previous year. Each year Scouts Queensland and Guides Queensland invite about 70 children as guests to participate in a week long camp at Baden-Powell Park, Samford, Queensland. Scouts New South Wales also holds an Agoonoree; in 2015 it was held at Mount Keira Scout Activity Centre. Scouts Victoria held their third Agoonoree in 2018 at Treetops Scout Camp, Riddells Creek.

== Indonesia ==
A National Special Scout Jamboree is held every five years for disabled Scouts. The seventh National Special Scouts Jamboree was held in 2007, in East Jakarta. The first jamboree of this sort to be held in Indonesia was in 1972.

== Japan ==
Nippon Agoonorees are held once every four years, and are abbreviated "NA", and may include the number of the event. For example, "9NA" refers to the 9th Nippon Agoonoree. SAJ (Scout Association of Japan) uploads these pictures in Facebook. Fumihito, Prince Akishino and Princess Mako participated in the Agoonoree on August 12, 2016.

- 1st Nippon Agoonoree: August 8 to August 20, 1973, Aichi Youth Park, Aichi Prefecture
- 2nd Nippon Agoonoree: July 30 to August 3, 1976, Aichi Youth Park, Aichi Prefecture
- 3rd Nippon Agoonoree: August 3 to August 8, 1979 Nagai Park, Osaka
- 4th Nippon Agoonoree: August 5 to August 9, 1983 Ureshinodai Lifelong Educational Center, Hyōgo Prefecture
- 5th Nippon Agoonoree: July 31 to August 4, 1987 Chuo Youth House, Gotenba, Shizuoka Prefecture
- 6th Nippon Agoonoree: July 25 to August 29, 1991 National Institution for Youth Education, Tokyo
- 7th Nippon Agoonoree: July 26 to July 30, 1995 National Myogo Youth Outdoor Learning Center, Niigata Prefecture
- 8th Nippon Agoonoree: August 5 to August 9, 1999, Outdoor Activity Center, Matsuyama, Ehime Prefecture
- 9th Nippon Agoonoree: July 31 to August 4, 2003, Refresh Town Hachi-ga-saki, Suzu, Ishikawa Prefecture
- 10th Nippon Agoonoree: July 31 to August 4, 2008 (It would have been held in 2007, but was moved to 2008 due to the World Scout Jamboree being held in 2007.) Happy Village, Kobe, Hyogo Prefecture
- 11th Nippon Agoonoree: August 2 to August 6, 2012, Kibogaoka Culture Park, Shiga Prefecture
- 12th Nippon Agoonoree: August 12 to August 16, 2016, Fuji Yamanomura, Fujimiya, Shizuoka Prefecture
- 13th Nippon Agoonoree: August, 2020 Fukushima Prefecture

== United Kingdom ==
The first camp for Extension Scouts of the London region was held in 1947. In the 1960s, the London Agoonoree consisted of between 60 and 80 Scouts with special needs accompanied by able-bodied Scouts who acted as helpers as well as adult Scouters. Later in the decade, the camp split into two, the northern Scout Counties of London forming "North Camp" and the Southern and Central being "South Camp". The annual London Agoonoree currently caters for members of The Scout Association with special needs in the 14-23 age group. The first Yorkshire Agoonoree was held in 1960.

== See also ==
- Extension Scouting
- World Jamboree
