= Dharmaraja College =

- ධර්මරාජ විද්‍යාලය

Location
- Kandy, Central Province; Sri Lanka; 7°17′22″N 80°38′59″E

Information
- Former name: Kandy Buddhist High School
- School type: National / Public 1AB
- Motto: Pali: අත්තාහි අත්තනො නාථො Aththāhi Aththano Natho (Oneself is the refuge for one - Buddhist quote from the Dhammapada)
- Religious affiliation: Buddhist
- Established: 30 June 1887; 139 years ago
- Founder: Col. Henry Steel Olcott
- School district: Kandy
- Educational authority: Ministry of Education
- School code: 03350
- Principal: Namal Chandana Kumara
- Staff: 300+
- Grades: 1 - 13
- Gender: Male
- Age: 6 to 19
- Enrollment: 4,000+
- Language: Sinhala, English
- Schedule: 7:30 AM - 1:30 PM
- Houses: Ananda; Gemunu; Mahinda; Parakrama
- Colours: Maroon and light blue
- Song: Sinhala: ශ්‍රී ලංකා ජනතා ගම ගාමී Sri Lanka Janatha Gama Gami
- Athletics: Yes
- Sports: Yes
- Rival: Kingswood College
- Affiliation: Mahamaya Girls' College
- Alumni: Old Rajans
- Pupils: Rajans
- Abbreviation: DRCK
- Website: dharmaraja.lk
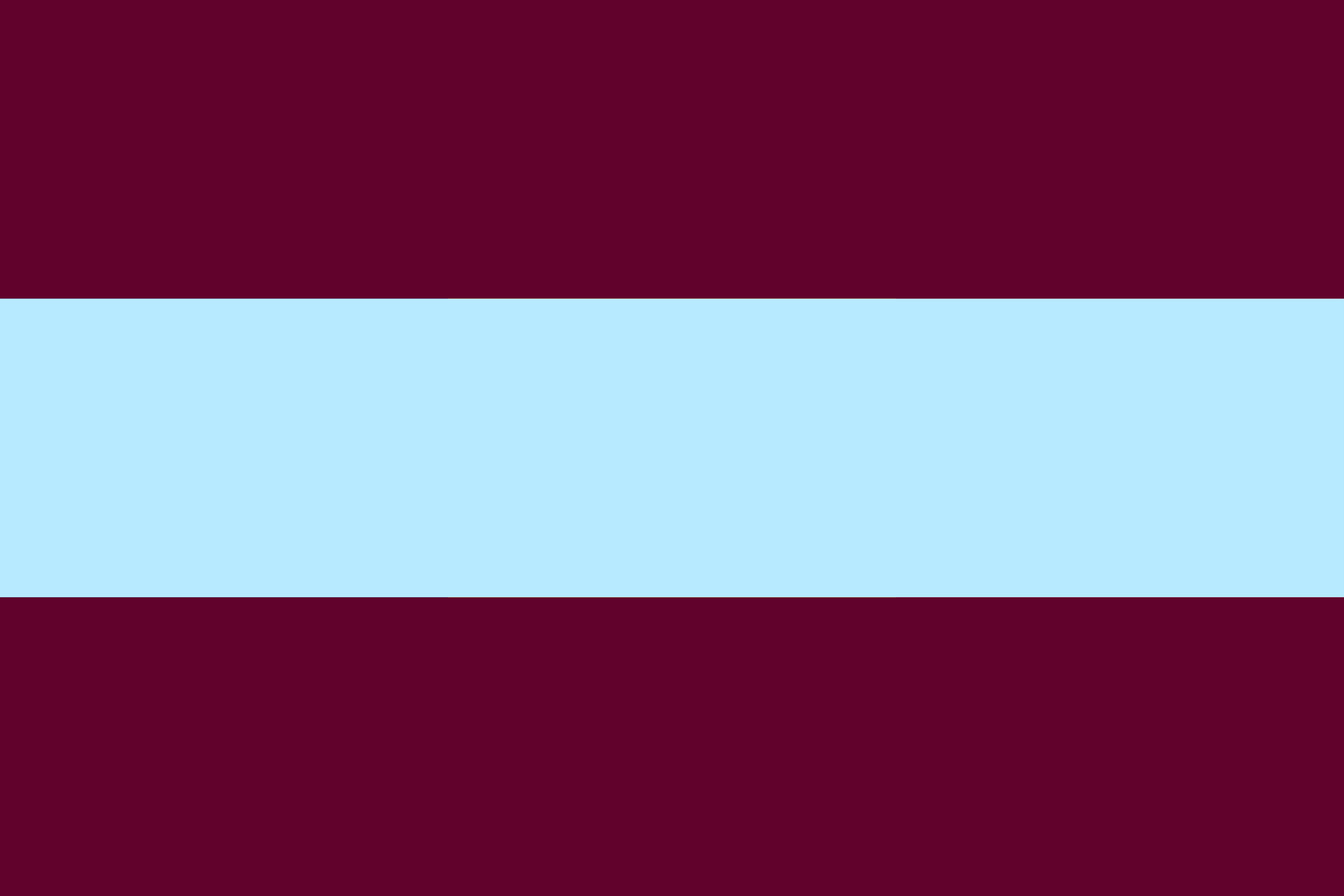
- Flag of Dharmaraja College

Dharmaraja College (Sinhala: ධර්මරාජ විද්‍යාලය), founded in 1887, is a boys' school in Kandy, Sri Lanka. It is a Buddhist school with around 300+ teaching staff and over 5000 students.

A land area of 220,000 square metres (54 acres) is owned by the school spreading over half of the Dharmaraja hill. Dharmaraja has one of the oldest scout troops in the world, the 1st Kandy Dharmaraja Scout Group, which was established in 1913. It is one of the first Sri Lankan schools to start playing cricket. It has consistently ranked among the first two boys schools in Sri Lanka in the preference rankings based on year 5 scholarship examinees' preferences.

== History ==
=== Background and initiation ===
Dharmaraja College, Kandy is one of the premier Buddhist schools in the country and is named after the Buddha. Dharmaraja College, as well as the other Buddhist schools in Sri Lanka, owes its existence to Col Henry Steel Olcott, philanthropist and the founder of the Buddhist Theosophical Society. Having read a printed version of the Panadura Vaadaya of 1873, a public debate between Buddhist and Christian representatives on the correctness of each belief, Col Olcott was impressed with the teachings in Theravada Buddhism, which were in line with his vision as a theosophist. It resulted in him arriving in Sri Lanka to study more on Buddhism, and starting a branch of the Theosophical Society, first in Colombo and then in Kandy and Galle. He was ably supported by the Venerable Migettuwatte Gunananda Thera – hero of the 'Panadura Vadaya', the Venerable Hikkaduwe Sri Sumangala Thera, the Venerable Dodanduwe Piyarathana Thero, the Venerable Walane Sri Siddhartha Thero and the Venerable Ratmalane Dhammaloka Thero, along with Anagarika Dharmapala, Walisinghe Harischandra, and Don Agaris Divakara Mohottige, Mudaliyar of Central Province. Mudaliyar Agaris was a popular and respected man throughout Kandy Province and had been given the title in 1878 after his father, Don Alexander-James Divakara Mohottige had died.

With Sir Olcott's initiative and guidance, the theosophists identified that a major factor for the decline of Sinhalese Buddhists was the lack of education facilities, and the best solution was to make available educational institutes with a Buddhist religious background. It was under this theory that foundations were laid for the beginning of the Buddhist schools in Sri Lanka, which include Dharmaraja College, Ananda College, Maliyadeva College and Mahinda College. In 1887 Sir Olcott visited Kandy and expressed his wish to start an English-medium Buddhist school with the help of Sumangala Thero and the Mudaliyar of Kandy at that time; D.M Agaris. Several Kandyan nobles were supportive of the idea, and it was decided that the plot of land in front of the Old Palace, adjoining the Natha Devalaya was the best for building the school. But there was an obstacle in that the plot was covered by a Bo tree, held sacred by the Buddhists, which had to be felled for putting up a school building. The British Administration opposed the felling citing that it would be an action against Buddhism. Wadugodapitiya Punchirala Korale felled and removed the tree in one night, and levelled up the plot for the building.

It was under this pretext that on 30 June 1887, Dharmaraja College, under the name of Kandy Buddhist High School, was opened. This occasion was graced by Sir Olcott, Mudaliyar Divakara Mohottige and several Kandyan nobles including Dullawe Adhikaram, Wadugodapitiya Punchirala Korale, T.B. Panabokke and A.D.J. Gunawardena.

Andiris de Silva was the first principal. He was the only teacher of the school at that time, which had enrolled 12 students. The number of students reached the 50s and the staff increased to three under Andiris de Silva, who was an efficient leader and an accomplished teacher. Many of the local nobles supported Mudaliyar Mohottige and the school by enrolling their children.

=== Initial development ===
However, by 1890, the necessity of a more qualified principal emerged and appointed Sir D.B. Jayatilaka as principal. The school had around 80 students by then. The foundations of transforming Dharmaraja from a mere educational establishment to one of the best schools in Sri Lanka were laid by Sir Jayathilake. Sir Jayathilake was appointed the deputy principal of Ananda College in 1898.

H. Banbury succeeded Sir Jayathilake as principal and he ran a campaign to raise funds for a permanent school building, travelling even in remote villages collecting donations. He used the money to build a single storied building near the city premises of the school, which was later named the 'Banbury Building' in his honour. One of the most notable events during his time was changing the name of the school to Dharmaraja College. Banbury left to India in 1899 to further pursue his studies. Wilton Hack took over from Banbury.

Later in 1899, following the retirement of Hack, C.S. Rajaratnam was appointed as principal. Though he himself was not a Buddhist, he was an acclaimed scholar and continued to guide the school along Buddhist principles and attitudes.

=== Golden age (1902-1935) ===
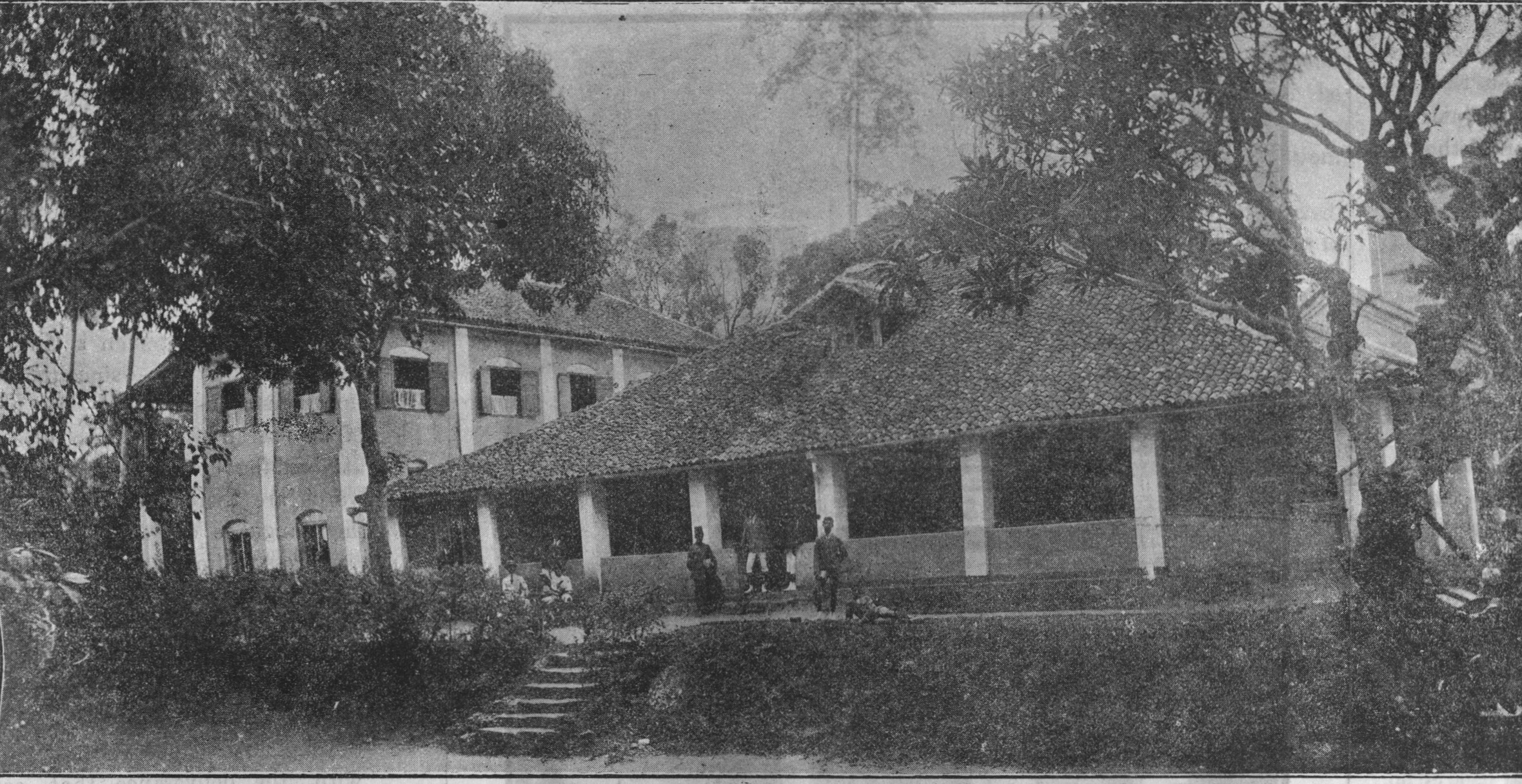
Old buildings (1920)

Dharmaraja's golden age began with the appointment of K.F. Billimoria as principal in 1902. Billimoria gave priority to shaping Dharmaraja into a strong institution which could ably compete with the other Missionary Schools at that time. The founder of the Scout Movement, Lord Baden Powell visited the 'Lake View Park International Scout Centre' of Dharmaraja College twice during this period. In 1915 a two-story building completed at the city premises, which later was named in honour of Billimoria.

By 1922 Billimoria had raised funds to purchase the 'Lake View Estate', a 37-acre (150,000 m^{2}) land overlooking the Kandy Lake, and built the A and B wings of the college hostel in 1923. The actual hostel began at the Principal's quarters in 1921. Among special events at the time a Nobel Laureate in Literature, the great Indian poet Rabindranath Tagore did a dance recital at the Principal's bungalow when he visited the school in the 1920s. And the English poet D. H. Lawrence spent a holiday at Ardnaree, the college Principal's bungalow, in 1922.

The College Scout Group began in 1914, under the patronage of De Saram Brothers and many sports and other extra-curricular activities were encouraged. The '1st Kandy Dharmaraja Scout Group' won the coveted King's Flag for three consecutive years from 1917 to 1919. The flag was awarded to the troop in any of the British colonies that had the largest number of King's Scouts. This is an unprecedented record held by any of the Sri Lankan schools even today. The Cricket Big-Match between Dharmaraja and Kingswood also began in this time. Several renowned figures visited Dharmaraja during his office, including Mahatma Gandhi, Lord Baden Powell and D. H. Lawrence. Billimoria served 30 years as principal. He retired in 1932, which led to the beginning of another important chapter of Dharmaraja History.

P. de S. Kularatne, who had served as the principal at Ananda College, took over duties from Billimoria in 1932 and continued the work. However, Dharmaraja was facing a financial crisis when Kularatne assumed duties, and even the Lake View premise was under threat of being sold. But Kularatne, was able to save the land and secure a home for Dharmaraja. He restored the hostel and transformed the Principal's quarters at the city premises to classrooms and a laboratory complex, and Dharmaraja started teaching science subjects in 1933. The first academic buildings in Lake View were built around this time. The roads and other facilities were developed. Cadetting in Dharmaraja began during Kularatne's office and so did sports including tennis, Swimming etc. In 1935 Dharmaraja was visited by four distinguished visitors from India; Rabindranath Tagore, Nandalal Bose, Uday Shankar and Kalki Krishnamurthy.

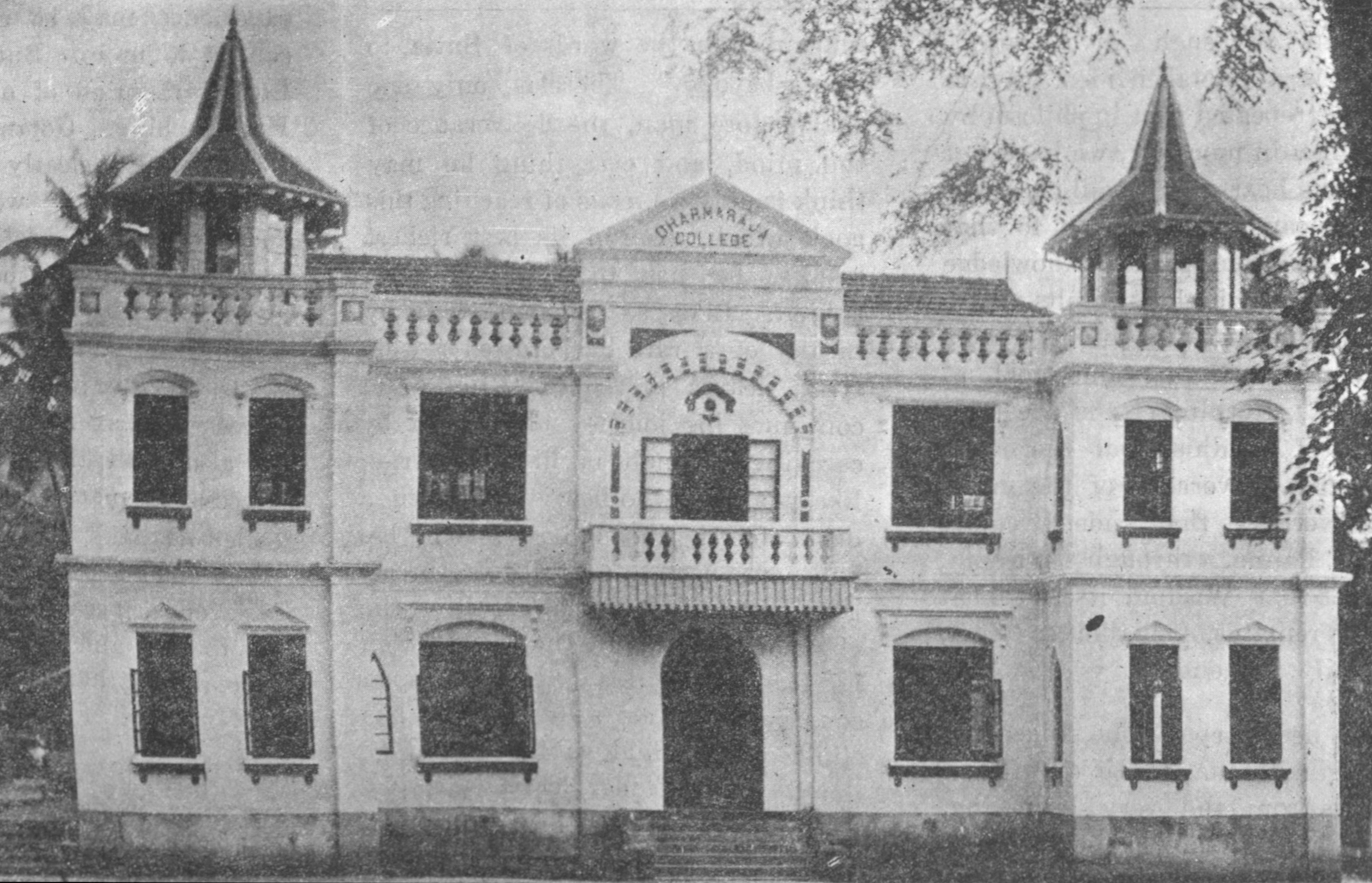
New building begun 1915 (1920)

=== Second fifty years (1936-1960) ===
In 1936 Kularatne was re-appointed as the principal of Ananda, and L.H. Mettananda, who was Ananda's principal at that time, was appointed principal of Dharmaraja. Mettananda identified the necessity of more buildings for the college and set off to build two two-storey buildings at the Lake View premises. It was funded using proceedings of the Golden Jubilee Carnival in 1937 and other fund-raising projects. Dharmaraja started its Advanced Level classes in 1940, and around this time the Secondary Section of the college was moved to Lake View, leaving only the Primary Section at the original premises. Mettananda served Dharmaraja for nearly ten years. In 1946 he was appointed principal back at Ananda, but his service to Dharmaraja would be remembered for years to come, especially with the Mettananda building which now houses the College Offices and the Library.

S. A. Wijayathilake was appointed principal of Dharmaraja in November 1945, the same year that free education was established in Sri Lanka. Wijayathilake faced the task of maintaining the momentum set by Mettananda and Kularatne. He added several more buildings to the school and also developed the laboratories and the library. Wijayathilake, who was a scholar of Buddhist studies and Classical Languages, emphasised on developing the literary activities of the students.

Flag of Dharmaraja College

Wijayathilake retired in early 1955 and was replaced by Charles Godage, who was also a patron of Arts and a poet and writer. He started the Dharmaraja Development Society in 1955. S.W.R.D. Bandaranaike started off his victorious campaign for the Parliamentary election of 1956, by an alms giving held at the Dharmaraja Primary School hall, which was known as a "Jayabima". In 1957, the "Kandy Education Front", which led the movement of persuading the Ceylonese government to take over assisted schools around the country, was established at the Dharmaraja Primary School hall under the Chairmanship of Sir Bennet Soysa, a distinguished Old Rajan. By 1959, the end of Godage's office, the number of students had risen from 842 to 1276. This meant many more buildings, lab equipment and resources were necessary. Godage, along with the Development Society, added several more classrooms and laboratories, and also repaired many others. Godage later left for England in 1959 for further pursuing his studies.

=== Public school (1960-1990) ===
D. B. Thewarapperuma took over the duties from Godage, and continued the progress Dharmaraja had achieved during Godage's office. In 1960 Dharmaraja, along with Ananda, was taken over by the Government, which was a result of strong campaign led by Thewarapperuma and others. This meant that further development and improvement of the school's resources could now be done without the cost burdening the school board. Thewarapperuma retired from his post in 1961. Colonel E. A. Perusinghe took office as principal in 1961, and this period showed a marked improvement in the number of students and the number of staff members. Examination results became very satisfactory with large numbers of students being selected to universities, and Col. Perusinghe improved the infrastructure by building more classrooms for the Middle Section, and encouraged students to express themselves through school magazines. Under Col. Perusinghe sports, Cadetting and Scouting activities prospered, with the students achieving National and International level victories. However Col. Perusinghe did not approve boxing as a suitable sport for a school and removed it as a sport.

Perusinghe retired in 1964 to be replaced by Colonel S. L. B. Amaranayake, who was an old boy of Dharmaraja. Amaranayake completed the shrine room of the college and opened it. The hostel facilities too were developed and Amaranayake settled the long term-problem of a water supply to the hostel. On 27 June 1965 the Kandy Municipal Council named the access road to the school as Dharmaraja Mawatha in recognition of the service rendered by the school. After serving Dharmaraja for nearly six years, Amaranayake retired in 1971.

D. G. B. Samarajiva took the helm of Dharmaraja from Amaranayake, and was responsible for re-structuring the administration of the college. He founded the Sports Council, which gave more responsibility to the students in organising the Sports Meet, Colours Nite and other sporting events. Samarajiva also restructured the internal administration by giving more responsibility to the Sectional Heads, and distributing the responsibilities of the Principal between Deputy Principals, accommodating them office space. He assigned Teachers as in charge of all the school societies, and also developed the library facilities by assigning a staff member as librarian and reserving funds for expansion. The Commerce section got its own library and Samarajiva also recruited a library staff to provide a better service to the students. After a short but important term as principal, Samarajiva left to Mathara District as the Director of Education in 1973.

A. P. Gunarathne took over office from Samarajiva in 1973. By this time Dharmaraja showed the best academic results in the Central Province, with many students being qualified to University education. Gunarathne initiated a Career Guidance Unit in 1983, which provided assistance to school-leavers for building a successful career. In 1985, the College Computer unit was established. In 1987 Dharmaraja celebrated its centenary with a Grand Exhibition, Grand Scout jamboree by the name "Dharmaraja Centenary JIM 1987" and many other events.

=== 1990 – 2000 period ===
Four principals lead Dharmaraja towards success during this period.

==== Development projects ====
Dharmaraja auditorium was built and opened to use of students and public. Dharmaraja badminton, weightlifting and body building facilities were developed.

==== Educational and co-curricular activities ====
Students from Dharmaraja college have performed well at examinations such as GCE O/L and GCE A/L with a number of selectees to the faculties of Medicine, Engineering and Law in local universities, each year. In addition, students from Dharmaraja College have represented Sri Lanka at international Olympiad Competitions including International Mathematics and Science Olympiad(IMSO), International Mathematics Competition(IMC), International Mathematics Olympiad(IMO), International Physics Olympiad (IPhO), International Biology Olympiad and International Olympiad on Astronomy and Astrophysics. Seven out of the 15 students selected to the International Olympiad on Astronomy and Astrophysics via Sri Lankan Astronomy and Astrophysics Olympiad for years 2007, 2008 and 2009 were from Dharmaraja College. Dharmaraja College Celebrated their 110th anniversary with a grand educational exhibition in 1997.

==== Extra-curricular and sport activities ====
Dharmaraja College Scouts were continuously selected as the best in the nation, while college cadet platoon and two bands (western and eastern) were mostly among the best three in their categories if not the winners at Sri Lanka national school level. The 1st Dharmaraja scout troop became the first Sri Lankan scout troop to conduct an expedition into the Himalayas, in 2007. This expedition was conducted to commemorate 100 years of Scouting, which Rajans scouts celebrated on top of the Lantang Lirung Glacier. Rajans cadets have secured Hermann Loos Championship Trophy, the national school championship, for several years between 1990 and 2000. All three platoons (cadets, eastern band and western band) became national runner-ups in their respective competitions in 1998. Many years, college athletic team was the champions at Kandy district and central province levels. Dharmaraja under17 athletics team was the national school champions in 1996. College soccer teams were among the best among school teams and under 19 team was the winners of the Milo Inter Schools Football tournament, the biggest soccer championship at school level, in 1998. Another sport that gave Rajans success is hockey. Dharmaraja College managed to remain national school champions for a couple years. Many old Rajan ruggerites, such as Indrajith Bandaranike and Radika Hettiarchchi, from this decade later were leading in Sri Lanka national team and local club teams (e.g. Kandy Sports Club). Badminton and Chess teams of Dharmaraja college had managed to be among the best in national school chess teams consistently. College weight lifting and power lifting team owned the national open titles and Sri Lanka weight lifting records during this time. One member of this team, old Rajan (99 A/L batch) P.K. Navindra Dayan later represented Sri Lanka at international level and won a silver medal at the 2006 South Asian Games. Boxing was restarted in Dharmaraja College and Rajan boxers won at national level and one such player who enjoyed success at school level, Gamini Kumara, later represented Sri Lanka at the South Asian Games in 1999 and won a silver medal.

Societies at Dharmaraja were out performing many other schools during this decade. Kala Ulela (arts festival) annually organised by Dharmaraja College Arts Foundation (Sinhala: Kala Padanama) was founded and became a nationally recognized event. The first Klaulela was held in year 1995. The College Shastriya Sangamaya Pioneered to start this great unique event in that year. in 1996 Kala Padanama was established and the Kalaulela was given current appearance. Dancing team of Dharmaraja college had the largest number of qualified traditional dancers and college painters were consistently winning at national and international school levels. Student painters of Dharmaraja College played a major role in preservation and restoration work at Temple of the Tooth after 1998 terrorist attack under the guidance of Kingsley Gunathilake, a renowned Sri Lankan painter. Buddhist Student Society (Sinhala: Bouddha Shishya Sangamaya), the largest student body in the school, expanded their events to other schools too. Dharmaraja Interact club and Drug Prevention Units were highly active during this period. Many of the district and national level school leaders of these areas were produced by Dharmaraja College.

=== Recent developments ===
Sir D. B. Jayathilake Memorial Dharmaraja College Archives was established extending the college museum in 2002 and its internet database is in operation since January 2009.

The college ground development project is a notable project, and the college swimming pool project, which had been underway for several years, was opened by the President of Sri Lanka, Mahinda Rajapaksa, in January 2010.

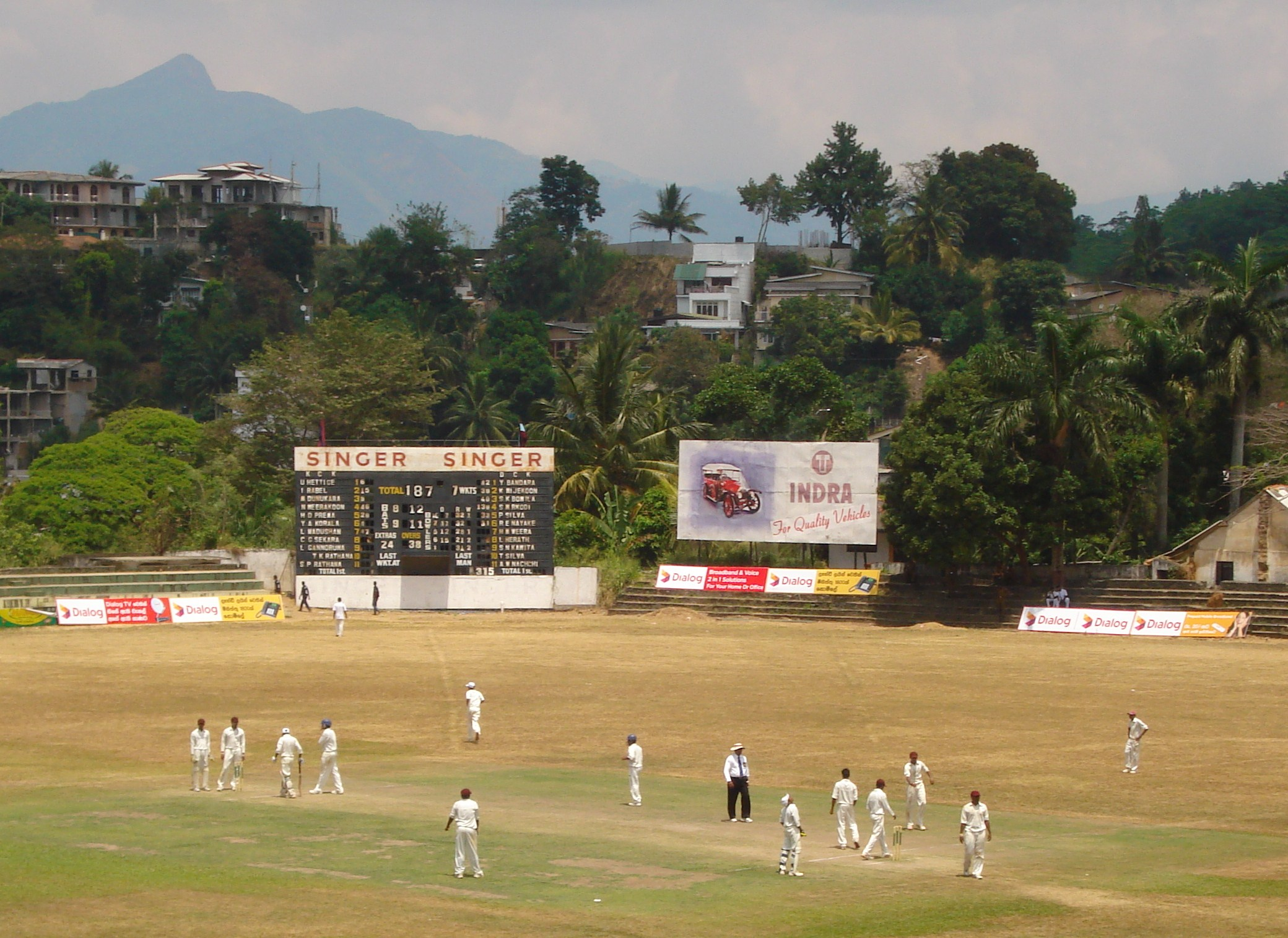
104th Battle of Maroons

== Battle of the Maroons ==
The Battle of the Maroons, Dharmaraja–Kingswood Cricket Encounter, being the oldest of its sort in Kandy with a history dating back to 1893, and the annual cross-country marathon are regular college fixtures. The annual cricket match against the school's traditional rival, Kingswood College, Kandy is the longest cricket match series in the central province, Sri Lanka. Out of those outings so far, Rajans lead the tally with 37 wins against 19 by Kingswood while 62 matches ending in a draw.

== School principals ==
- Andiris De Silva (1887–1890)
- Sir D.B. Jayatilaka (1890–1898)
- H. Banbury (1898–1899)
- Wilton Hack (1899)
- C. S. Rajaratnam (1899–1902)
- K. F. Billimoria (1902–1932)
- P. de S. Kularatne (1932–1936)
- L. H. Mettananda (1936–1945)
- S. A. Wijayathilake (1945–1955)
- Charles Godage (1955–1959)
- D. B. Thewarapperuma (1959–1961)
- E. A. Perusinghe (1961–1964)
- S. L. B. Amaranayake (1964–1971)
- D. G. B. Samarajiva (1971–1973)
- A. P. Gunaratne (1973–1987)
- U. B. Herath (1987–1988)
- Nihal Herath (1988–1990)
- T. B. Damunupola (1990–1995)
- W. Bandaranayake (1995–1998)
- A. B. Herath (1998–2001)
- S. M. Keerthiratne (2001–2016)
- Dampiya Wanasinghe (2016-2021)
- Kamal Ariyasinghe (2021-2025)
- Namal Chandana Kumara (2026-present)

== Notable alumni ==
William Gopallawa

Former students of the college are known as Old Rajans. The highest-ranking official amongst the Old Rajans is William Gopallawa (who subsequently attended St. Anthony's College, Kandy), and was the first President of Sri Lanka and the last Governor-General of Ceylon.

Pujith Jayasundara, the 34th Inspector-General of Police (IGP) from 2016 to 2020, and Air Chief Marshal Sudarshana Pathirana, the 18th Commander of the Air Force from 2020 to 2023 were also Old Rajans.

Other notable alumni (a.k.a. Rajans) include A. E. Goonesinha, T.B Kehelgamuwa, Chamara Kapugedera, Sudarshana Pathirana and the current Speaker of the Parliament of Sri Lanka Dr. Jagath Wickremerathna and others.

== Notable teachers ==
- Bogoda Seelawimala Nayaka Thera – Incumbent Head Priest of the London Buddhist Vihara and the current Chief Sangha Nayaka of Great Britain.
- Air Marshal Sudarshana Karagoda Pathirana – 18th Commander of the Sri Lanka Air Force
- Mahopadyaya Aluthgama Dhammananda Thera– Senior member, Karaka Sangha Sabha, Malwatte Chapter.
- Wendaruwe Sri Upali Thera –Anunayaka Thera of Asgiriya Chapter
- Don Baron Jayatilaka
- Tuan Burhanudeen Jayah
- Harischandra Wijayatunga

== See also ==
- Old Rajans Scouts Association
- Education in Sri Lanka
