= Extension Scouting =

Special needs programs in Scouting organizations

- Country: Various
- Founder: Robert Baden-Powell

Extension Scouting are programs in some Scout organizations for young people with disabilities.

== Background ==
Extension Scouting was earlier called Scouts Malgré Tout, which is French for "Scouts Despite Everything". It aims to meet the mandate from Robert Baden-Powell, founder and first Chief Scout of The Boy Scouts Association in the United Kingdom, that the programme be made "open to all."

Scoutlink badge of The Scout Association of the United Kingdom

Young people with disabilities join in with Scout groups on a regular basis but some organizations provide a special parallel program tailored to these participants. For example, The Scout Association of the United Kingdom formed a Disabled Scout Branch in 1926 and has various Scoutlink groups around the country. Scoutlink is a program run by The Scout Association of the United Kingdom in order to provide support and involvement for young people and adults with developmental disabilities, a form of Extension Scouting but is also the name of an Internet chat site and joint programs between The Scout Association in Northern Ireland and Scouting Ireland.

Extension Scouting is known by different names:

- in the Netherlands, "Blauwe Vogels" (Blue Birds), after the play L'Oiseau Bleu by Maurice Maeterlinck;
- in Scouts en Gidsen Vlaanderen, "AKABE", Anders KAn BEst (Different is all-right);
- in Polish Scouts, "Nieprzetarty Szlak";
- in Kenya Scouts Association, "Street Scouts".

== See also ==
- Agoonoree
- Scouts with Special Needs and Disabilities
