= Úlfljótsvatn =

Úlfljótsvatn may refer to

- Lake Úlfljótsvatn
- Úlfljótsvatn Scout Center
