= Lesser golden plover =

The lesser golden plover is the name for the composite species of birds which is now regarded as two separate species:

- American golden plover
- Pacific golden plover
