= Icelandic Society for the Protection of Birds =

Icelandic non-governmental organisation

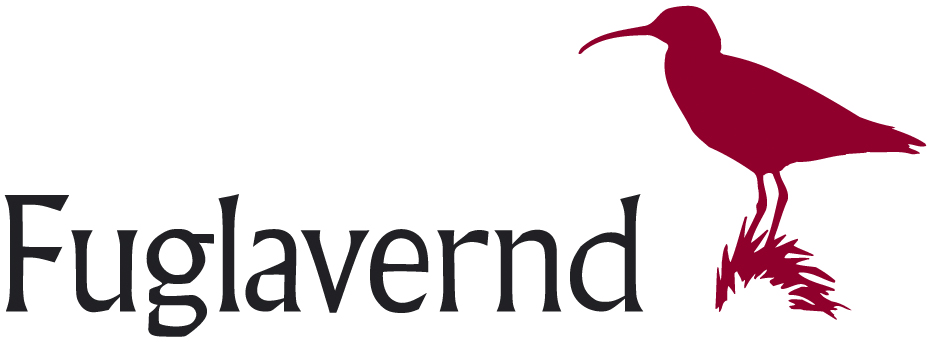
Logo of ISPB/Fuglavernd

The Icelandic Society for the Protection of Birds (or the Fuglavernd) was established in 1963 and is the main amateur or non-governmental organisation in Iceland concerned with the conservation of birds and their habitats and the spreading of convervation knowledge.

== History ==
For many years Dr Björn Guðbrandsson (1917–2006) was the society's main driving force. For its first 30 years, it was principally concerned with saving the Icelandic white-tailed eagle population from extinction, and it was thanks to the efforts of the society that it did not become extinct in the 1960s. In more recent times in addition to society has argued for banning the hunting of the rock ptarmigan and the Greenland white-fronted goose. These bans have been effected.

== Habitat protection ==
The society has identified and campaigned for the conservation and protection of some important areas and has even helped establish a reserve east of the Ölfusá River and north of Eyrarbakki, the Flói Nature Reserve (in cooperation with the Árborg community).

== International connections ==
The Fuglavernd is the Icelandic designated partner of BirdLife International. A European Union-funded project aiming to restore the Iclandic peatlands used by migratory birds is also supported by the United Kingdom's Royal Society for the Protection of Birds.
