= Flói Nature Reserve =

Nature reserve in Iceland

Coordinates: 63.899°N 21.185°W

The Flói Nature Reserve (Icelandic pronunciation: [ˈflouːɪ]) is a bird and nature reserve located near Árborg municipality in the Southern Region of Iceland. It includes a stretch of the east shore of the Ölfusá River. The reserve measures roughly 1–1.5 km (0.62–0.93 mi) wide by 4.5 km (2.8 mi) long, with an area of about 5 km^{2} (1.9 sq mi). It is an Internationally Important Bird Area as recognised by BirdLife International. It is all low-lying wetland, on average only 2 m (6.6 ft) above sea level, and is subject to seawater flooding at the spring tide. There are vistas of the surrounding mountains. The reserve establishment began in spring 1997 when Icelandic Society for the Protection of Birds was awarded funding from the Environmental Fund for Trade and its operation has received support from the Royal Society for the Protection of Birds from the UK.

== Birds on the reserve ==
The following birds have been reported as having been seen there:

- Whooper swan
- Greylag goose
- Mallard
- Eurasian wigeon
- Common teal
- Scaup
- Tufted duck
- Red-breasted merganser
- Pintail
- Gadwall
- Northern shoveler
- Eider duck
- Red-throated diver
- Black-headed gull
- Arctic tern
- Arctic skua
- Lesser black-backed gull
- Great black-backed gull
- Meadow pipit
- Dunlin
- Whimbrel
- Black-tailed godwit
- Common snipe
- Northern wheatear
- Red-necked phalarope
- Golden plover
