= Úlfljótsvatn (lake) =

Lake in Southern Region, Iceland

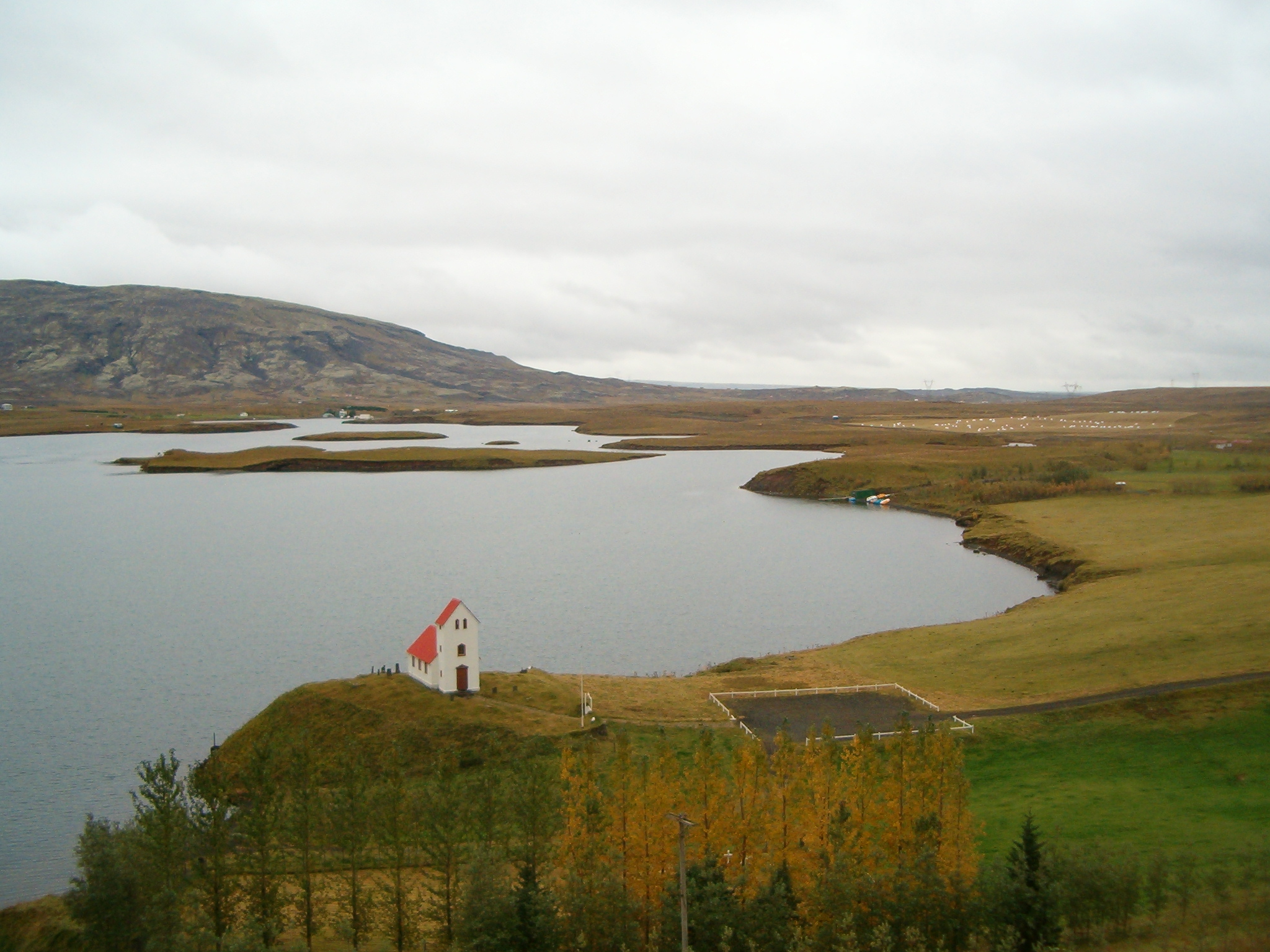
- Úlfljótsvatn

- Location within Iceland
- Location: Southern Region, Iceland
- Coordinates: 64°7′12″N 21°1′59″W
- Primary inflows: Sog
- Primary outflows: Sog
- Basin countries: Iceland
- Max. length: 4 kilometres (2.5 mi)
- Max. width: 1.2 kilometres (0.75 mi)
- Surface area: 3.6 km^{2} (1.4 sq mi)
- Average depth: 4.7 metres (15 ft)
- Max. depth: 34.5 metres (113 ft)
- Water volume: 16 gigalitres (570,000,000 cu ft)
- Surface elevation: 80 m (260 ft)
- References: https://kristjfr.files.wordpress.com/2015/03/os_kort_ulfljotsvatn.pdf

Úlfljótsvatn (Icelandic pronunciation: [ˈulvˌljoutsˌvahtn̥], Úlfljótr's Lake) is a lake in southern Iceland, to the south of lake Þingvallavatn, 74km east of Reykjavík. Úlfljótsvatn is named after Úlfljótr, an important man who was involved in the Alþingi (Icelandic Parliament) in 930.

In the vicinity, the Icelanders have many summer cottages.

== Geography ==
The lake has an area of 3.6 km^{2} and is situated at an altitude of 80 m. At the deepest point, Úlfljótsvatn is about 34.5 meters deep. The lake has a water area of 3.6 km^{2} and is located directly south of the larger lake Þingvallavatn on the Sog river, which continues to Álftavatn.

The lake in the warm season attracts anglers. Trout and lake char can be found in the waters of the lake.

== History ==
Orkuveita Reykjavíkur bought the rights in 1929–1933 to generate electricity in the upper run of the Sog. In 1937, the Ljósafoss [ˈljouːsaˌfɔsː] power station was then built, increasing the water level by about 1 metre.

The Icelandic Scout and Guides Association has had its national scout centre by the lake since 1940. It hosted the World Scout Moot there in 2017.

== Traffic ==
To the east of the lake is road no. 36, southwest of road no. 360.

== See also ==
- List of lakes in Iceland
