= Tómasson =

Tómasson is a surname of Icelandic origin, meaning son of Tómas. In Icelandic names, the name is not strictly a surname, but a patronymic. The name refers to:

- Haukur Tómasson (b. 1960), Icelandic composer
- Helgi Tómasson (1896–1958), Icelandic physician and psychiatrist
- Helgi Tómasson (dancer) (b. 1942), Iceland-born ballet dancer and artistic director of the San Francisco Ballet company (California, USA)
- Jon Dahl Tomasson (b. 1976), Danish former football player and manager
