= Grímur =

- Gender: Male
- Language: Faroese, Icelandic

Origin
- Origin: Old Norse
- Region of origin: Faroe Islands, Iceland

Grímur (Icelandic pronunciation: [ˈkriːmʏr̥]) is a Faroese and Icelandic masculine given name. People bearing the name Grímur include:

- Grímur Geitskör (fl. 10th-century), responsible for establishing the Icelandic parliament Althing
- Grímur Grímsson, member of the Icelandic parliament
- Grímur Hákonarson (born 1977), Icelandic film director and screenwriter
- Grímur Jónsson Thorkelin (1752–1829), Icelandic–Danish scholar
- Grímur Kamban (fl. 8th or 9th-century), first man to set foot in the Faroe Islands
- Grímur Thomsen (1820–1896), Icelandic poet and editor
