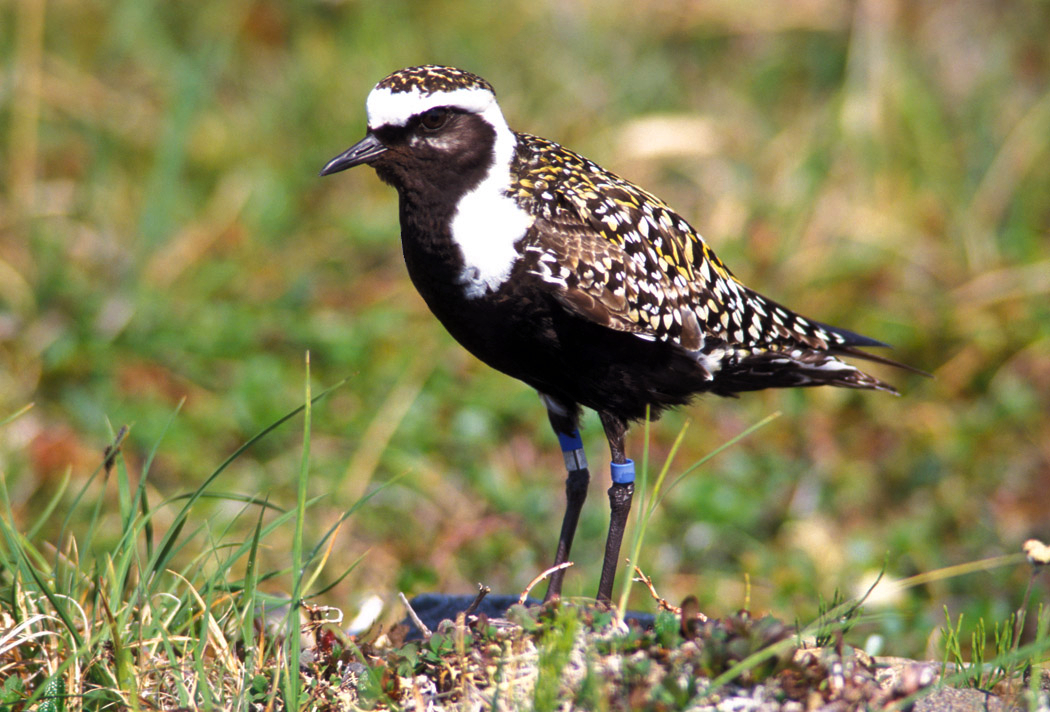
- American golden plover (Pluvialis dominica)

Scientific classification
- Kingdom: Animalia
- Phylum: Chordata
- Class: Aves
- Order: Charadriiformes
- Family: Charadriidae
- Subfamily: Charadriinae
- Genus: Pluvialis; Brisson, 1760

Type species
- Charadrius apricarius (= Pluvialis apricaria) Linnaeus, 1758

Species
- see text

= Pluvialis =

Genus of birds

Pluvialis is a genus of plovers, a group of wading birds comprising four species that breed in the temperate or Arctic Northern Hemisphere.

In breeding plumage, they all have largely black underparts, and golden or silvery upperparts. They have relatively short bills and feed mainly on insects, worms or other invertebrates, depending on habitat, which are obtained by a run-and-pause technique, rather than the steady probing of some other wader groups. They hunt by sight, rather than by feel as do longer-billed waders.

== Taxonomy ==
The genus Pluvialis was described by the French zoologist Mathurin Jacques Brisson in 1760 with the European golden plover (Pluvialis apricaria) as the type species. The genus name is Latin and means relating to rain, from pluvia, "rain". It was believed that they flocked when rain was imminent.

The genus contains four species:

| Breeding Plumage | Non-breeding Plumage | Common name | Scientific name | Distribution |
|---|---|---|---|---|
| | | European golden plover | Pluvialis apricaria | Arctic tundra and other palearctic areas |
| | | Pacific golden plover | Pluvialis fulva | Arctic regions of Siberia and Alaska |
| | | American golden plover | Pluvialis dominica | Arctic tundra from northern Canada and Alaska. |
| | | Grey plover or black-bellied plover | Pluvialis squatarola | pan-arctic; cosmopolitan wintering range |

The American and Pacific golden plovers were formerly considered conspecific as "lesser golden plover".
