= Páll Gíslason =

- Born: 3 October 1924; Vífilsstaðir, Kingdom of Iceland
- Died: 1 January 2011 (aged 86); Reykjavík, Iceland
- Occupation: Medical practitioner
- Known for: Chief Scout of the Bandalag íslenskra skáta
- Medical career
- Profession: Doctor
- Field: Vascular surgery
- Institutions: National University Hospital of Iceland

Páll Gíslason (3 October 1924 – 1 January 2011) was an Icelandic medical practitioner in Reykjavík and a pioneer in vascular surgery in Iceland. Outside of his medical career, he served as the Chief Scout of the Bandalag íslenskra skáta, the Icelandic Scout association, from 1971 to 1981 and a city councilman in Reykjavík for 24 years.

== Early life ==
Páll was born in Vífilsstaðir in Garðahreppur on 3 October 1924 but grew up in Eskifjörður, Hafnarfjörður and Reykjavík. His parents where Gísli Pálsson, a doctor, and Svana Jónsdóttir.

== Icelandic Scout Association ==
Páll became a Scout at the age of 12 in 1936, and led his national association in the 1950s. He led Iceland's delegation of 23 young people to the 6th World Scout Jamboree in 1947. The story is told that as he was looking for land in eastern Iceland to celebrate the fiftieth anniversary of the Scouts of Iceland in 1962, he exclaimed that he did not know anyone on that side the island, "because farmers are never sick!", however when a farmer needed his care, he allowed Páll to use his land for the celebration.

In 1981, Páll was awarded the 144th Bronze Wolf, the only distinction of the World Organization of the Scout Movement, awarded by the World Scout Committee for exceptional services to world Scouting.

== Political career ==
Páll served in the Akranes city council from 1962 to 1970 and later in the Reykjavík City Council from 1974 to 1998. He was the council president from end of December 1984 to middle of 1985.

== Books ==
In 2010, Páll authored the book Læknir í blíðu og stríðu with Hávar Sigurjónsson which focused on his life and career.
