= Sog (river) =

River in Iceland

Coordinates: 64°5′19.45″N 21°0′29.95″W

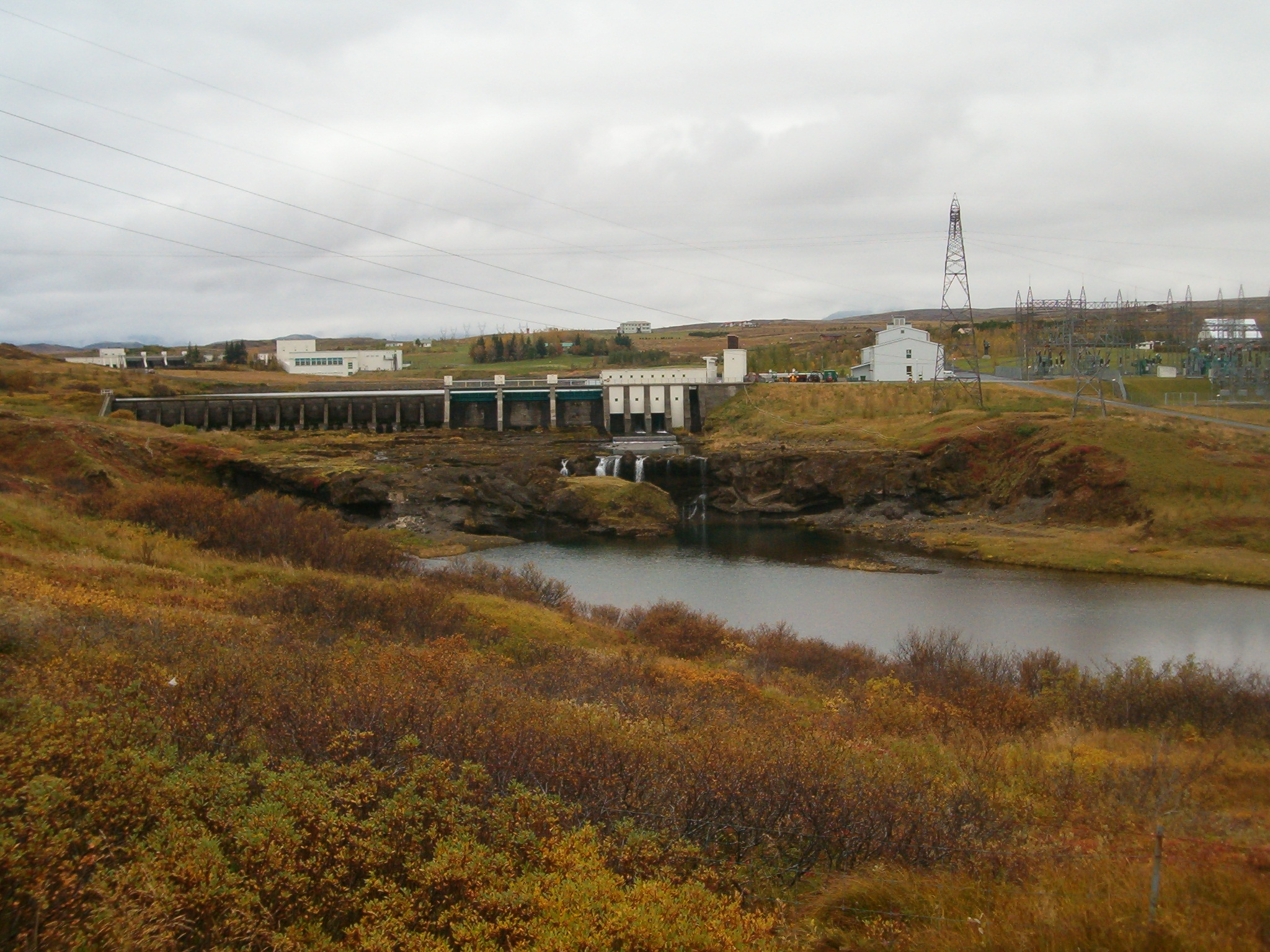
The hydroelectric power station on the Sog River

The Sog (Icelandic pronunciation: [ˈsɔːx]; more commonly Sogið [ˈsɔijɪθ]) is a river in Iceland. It runs from the lake Þingvallavatn for 21.9 kilometres (13.6 mi) to its confluence with the river Hvítá, forming the river Ölfusá which then runs for another 25 km (16 mi) into the Atlantic Ocean. Its average discharge is 110 m^{3}/s (3,900 cu ft/s).

There are three hydroelectric power stations on the river: Ljósafossstöð (15 MW), Írafossstöð (48 MW) and Steingrímsstöð (27 MW).

The river runs through two lakes, Úlfljótsvatn and Álftavatn.

It has a healthy stock of arctic char and Atlantic salmon. The size of the char can be anywhere from 0.5 to 5 pounds (0.23 to 2.27 kg) with an average size of 1 pound (0.45 kg). The most common weight for salmon is 5 to 10 pounds (2.3 to 4.5 kg) with a few fish caught each year from 20 to 30 pounds (9.1 to 13.6 kg). There are also brown trout in the River.

== See also ==
- List of rivers of Iceland
