= Úlfljótr =

Úlfljótr (Old Norse: [ˈuːlvˌljoːtr]; Modern Icelandic: Úlfljótur [ˈulvˌljouːtʏr̥]) was an Icelandic jurist who brought law to Iceland and is regarded by some as Iceland's first lawspeaker. In around 927–930 AD Úlfljótr was sent to Norway by a group of chieftains to study law and culture and bring back to Iceland sufficient understanding to help establish Iceland's legal framework and form of government – and while he was in Norway, where he stayed for around three years, Grímur Geitskor, Úlfljótr's half-brother, made a survey of Iceland to find the best place for the establishment of the Althing. Úlfljótr is commemorated with the first law enacted at the Alþing, Úlfljót's Law, with the lake Úlfljótsvatn and by the Úlfljótur Law Review.

== Other sources ==
- Benediktsson, Jakob (1974) “Landnám og upphaf allsherjarríkis,” Saga Íslands 1, Reykjavík
- Wikisource:Íslendingabók: Section 3. On the establishment of the Alþingi (Accessed Feb 2011)
- Sigurður Líndal: “Sendiför Úlfljóts”, i Skírnir 143, 1969, s. 5–26
- Sveinbjörn Rafnsson: Studier i Landnámsbók. Kritiska bidrag till den isländska fristatens historia, Lund 1974
- H. Magerøy: biografi i NBL1, bd. 17, 1975
