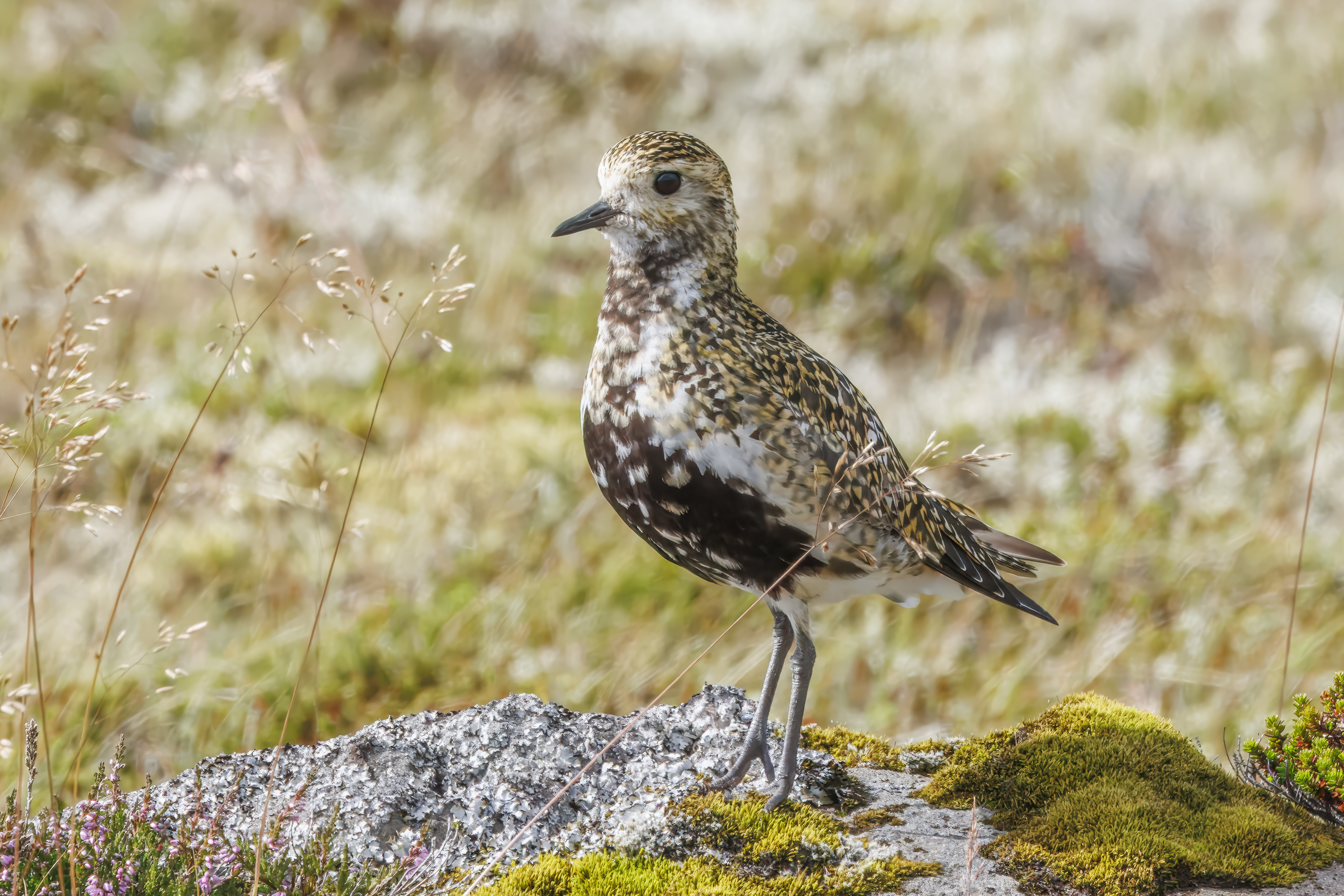
- Adult female in breeding plumage, Iceland

Conservation status
- Least Concern (IUCN 3.1)

Scientific classification
- Kingdom: Animalia
- Phylum: Chordata
- Class: Aves
- Order: Charadriiformes
- Family: Charadriidae
- Genus: Pluvialis
- Species: P. apricaria

Binomial name
- Pluvialis apricaria (Linnaeus, 1758)

Synonyms
- Charadrius apricarius Linnaeus, 1758; Charadrius pluvialis Linnaeus, 1758

Audio
- Calls

= European golden plover =

Species of bird

The European golden plover (Pluvialis apricaria), also known as the Eurasian golden plover, greater golden plover, or just the golden plover within Europe, is a relatively large species of plover. This species is similar to two other golden plovers, the American golden plover, Pluvialis dominica, and Pacific golden plover, Pluvialis fulva, which are both slightly smaller, slimmer and longer-legged than European golden plover, and both have grey rather than white axillary (armpit) feathers (visible in flight, and when the bird stretches its wings on the ground).

== Taxonomy ==
The European golden plover was formally described by the Swedish naturalist Carl Linnaeus in 1758 in the tenth edition of his Systema Naturae. He placed it with the other plovers in the genus Charadrius and coined the binomial name Charadrius apricarius. The species is now placed in the genus Pluvialis that was introduced in 1760 by the French zoologist Mathurin Jacques Brisson. The genus name is Latin and means "relating to rain", from pluvia, "rain". It was believed that golden plovers flocked when rain was imminent. The species name apricaria is Latin and means "to bask in the sun". The European golden plover is monotypic: no subspecies are recognised.

== Description ==
The European golden plover is quite thickset, with its wings only being slightly longer than its tail. Its most distinct feature is a white "s"-shaped band stretching from its forehead to its flanks.

== Distribution and habitat ==
The European golden plover tends to breed in the Arctic tundra and other moorland areas, ranging as far west as Iceland, where they are called Heiðlóa, and as far east as central Siberia; the southernmost breed in Wales and Belarus, after a small breeding population on Dartmoor in southwest England became extinct in about 2010.

In winter, it migrates southwest to milder regions of Europe, northwest Africa, and southwest Asia, from Ireland east to Denmark, and south to the Mediterranean region as far as Algeria, northern Egypt, and the Caspian Sea coast of Iran. It tends to gather in large flocks in open areas such as agricultural plains, ploughed land, and short meadows, ranging from lowland plains to subarctic plateaus, typically in flat terrain with moderate vegetation near wetlands. Vagrants have been recorded west to the east coast of Canada (Newfoundland, Nova Scotia), south to Gambia, and east to Pakistan and northern India.

== Behaviour and ecology ==
European golden plover call

The European golden plover's call is a monosyllabic, slightly descending, melancholic "tuu".

Its flight action is rapid and powerful, with regular wingbeats.

In the United Kingdom, golden plover chicks rely on craneflies for feeding, while in Sweden march flies are more important.

== Status ==
The European golden plover is one of the species to which the Agreement on the Conservation of African-Eurasian Migratory Waterbirds (AEWA) applies. Overall, the species is secure, being listed by IUCN as Least Concern, but populations on the southern fringe of the breeding range are declining or extinct in several countries, including Britain, Denmark (extinct as a breeding bird), Belgium (extinct as a breeding bird), Poland (extinct as a breeding bird), Germany, and southern Sweden. It is most abundant in Iceland, which holds about a third of the global population.

== In culture ==
=== Folklore ===
The European golden plover spends summers in Iceland, and in Icelandic folklore, the appearance of the first plover in the country means that spring has arrived. The Icelandic media always covers the first plover sighting, which in 2017, took place on 27 March, and in 2020, on 16 March. The plover is also a symbol of femininity and womanhood in Iceland.

=== Origin of Guinness World Records ===
On 10 November 1951, Sir Hugh Beaver, then the managing director of the Guinness Breweries, went on a shooting party in the North Slob, by the River Slaney in County Wexford, Ireland. After missing a shot at a Eurasian golden plover, he became involved in an argument over which was the fastest game bird in Europe, the golden plover or the red grouse (the former being correct). That evening at Castlebridge House, he realised that it was impossible to confirm in reference books whether or not the golden plover was Europe's fastest game bird. Beaver knew that there must be numerous other questions debated nightly in pubs throughout Ireland, but there was no book in the world with which to settle arguments about records. He realised then that a book supplying the answers to this sort of question might prove popular. A Guinness employee told Sir Hugh of two twin brothers, Norris and Ross McWhirter, who had opened a fact checking agency in London. Sir Hugh interviewed the brothers and, impressed by their prodigious knowledge, commissioned the book. Later, he published the first Guinness World Records which became a best seller within months.

== Gallery ==
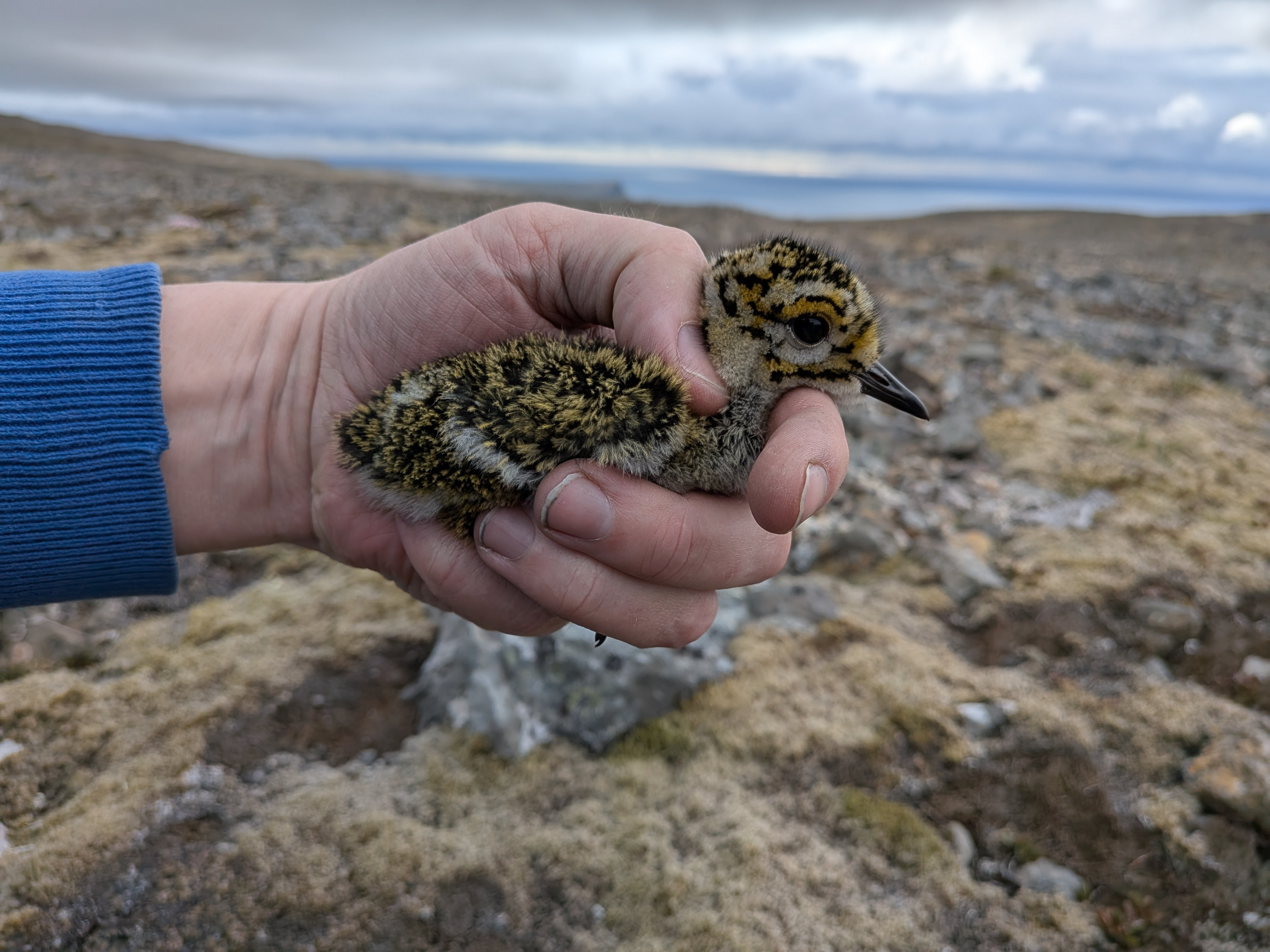
Golden plover chick in Iceland

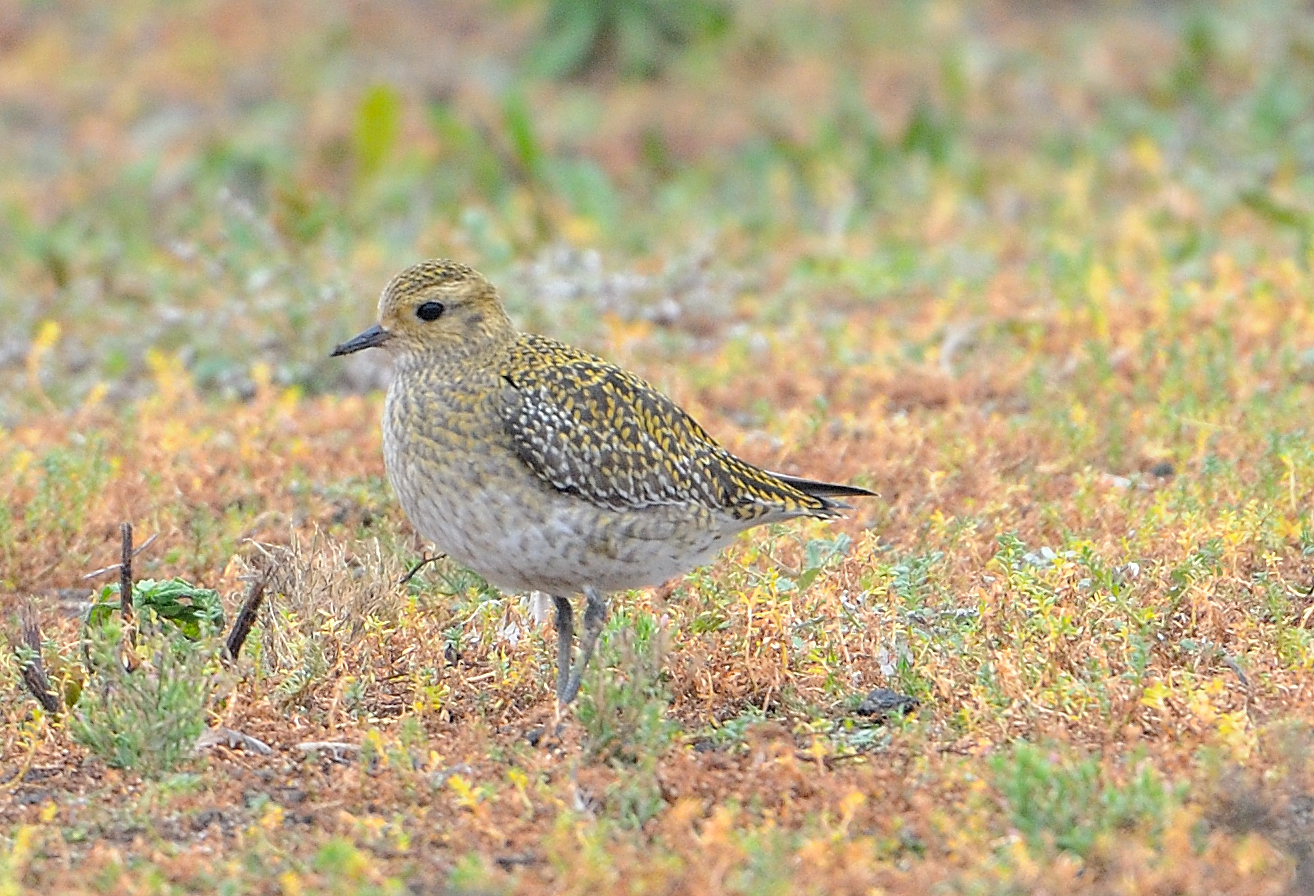
Winter plumage; November, Norfolk, UK

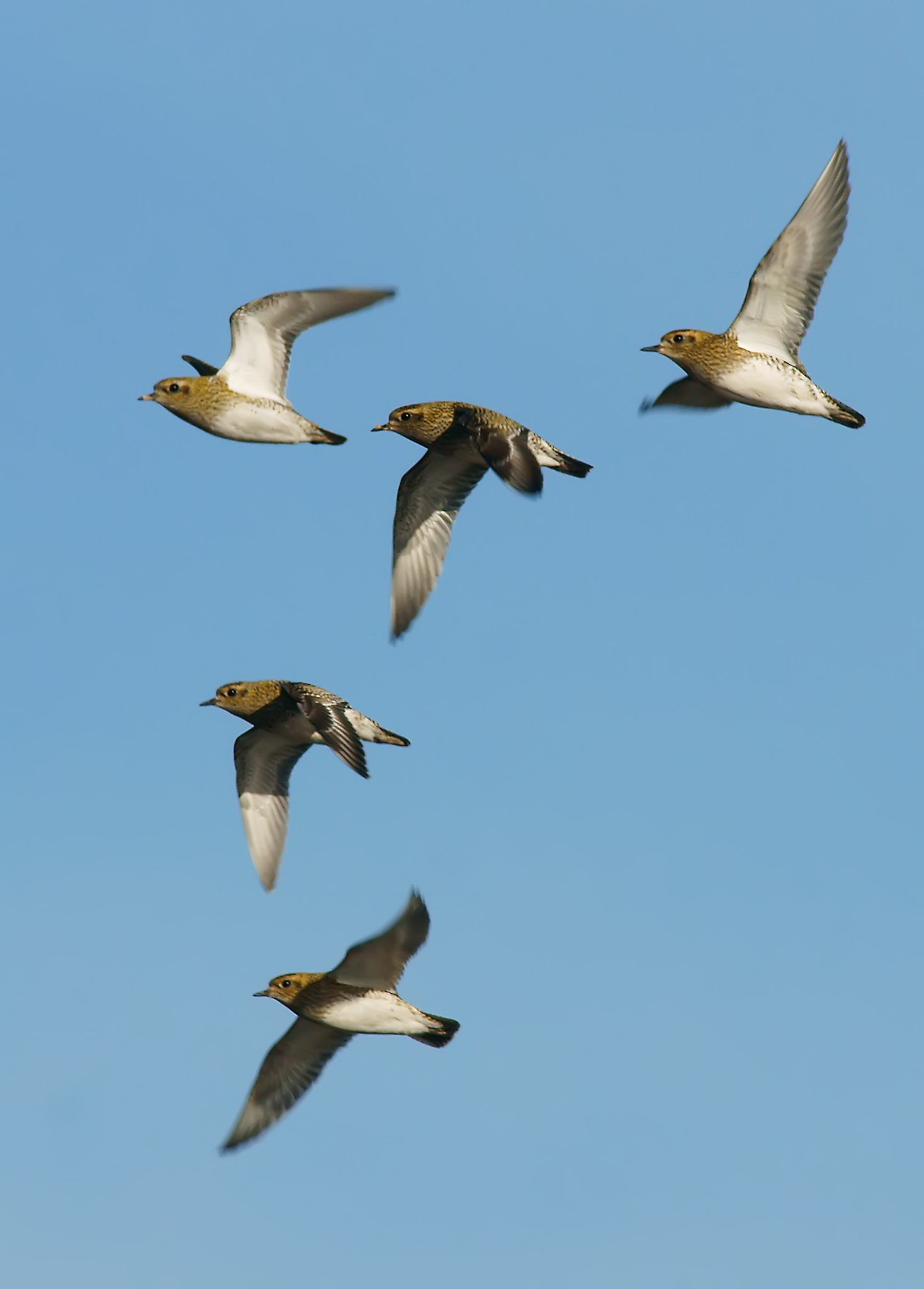
Group in flight, showing the white axillary feathering; December, Delta del Llobregat, Barcelona, Spain

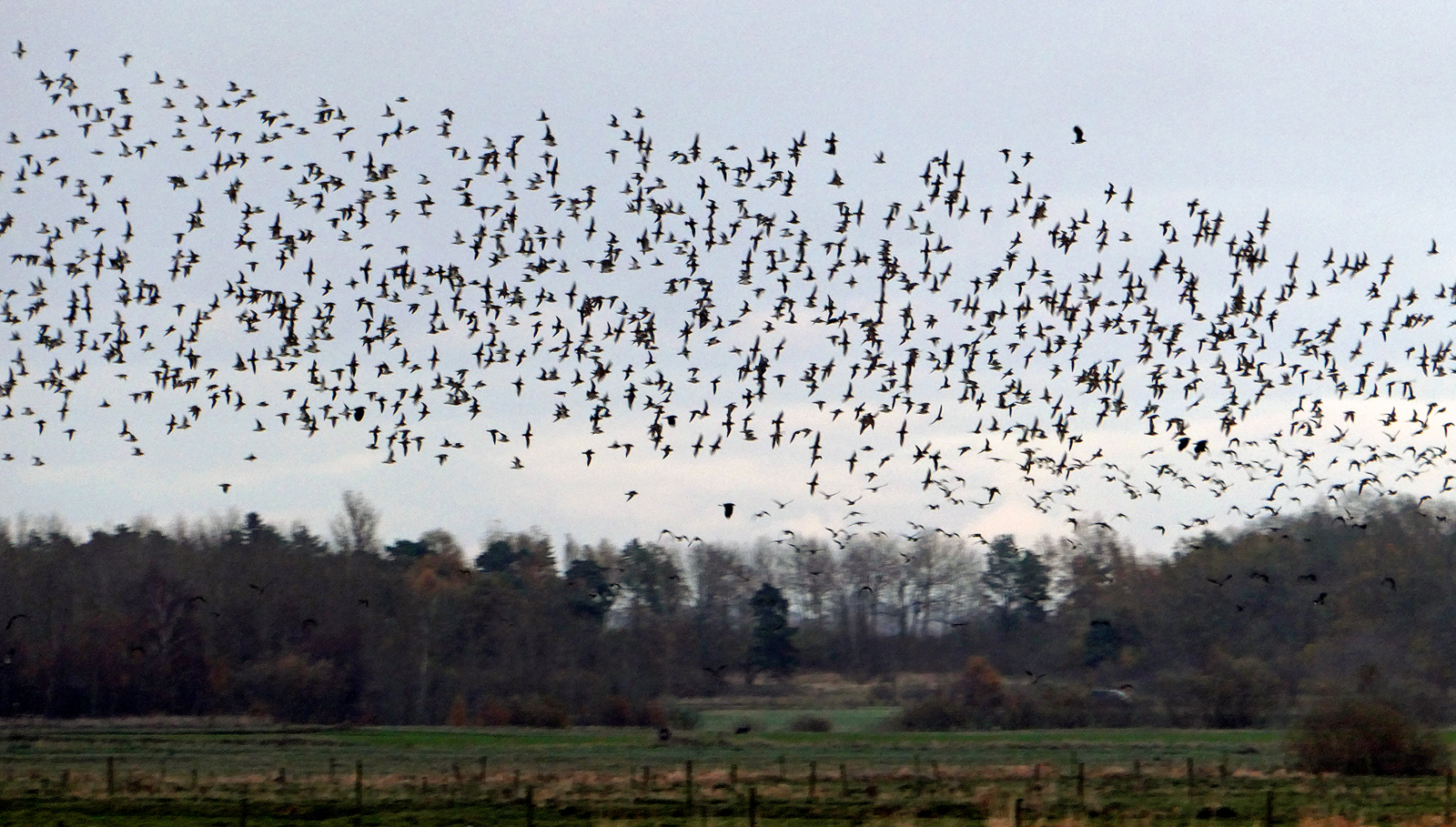
A large flock in Ystad, Sweden.

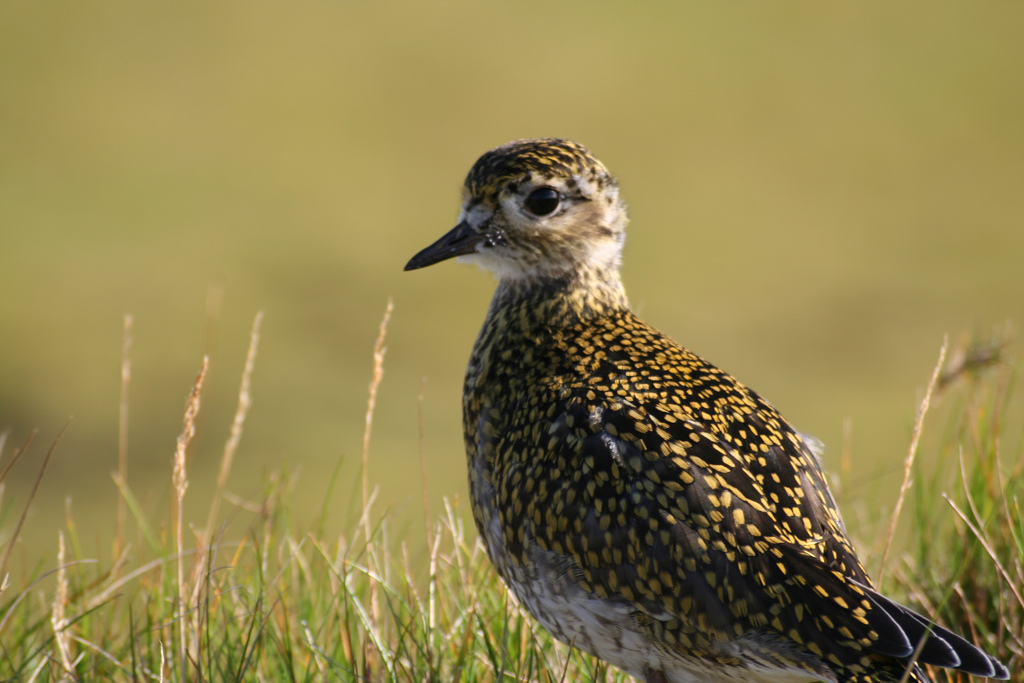
In Iceland.

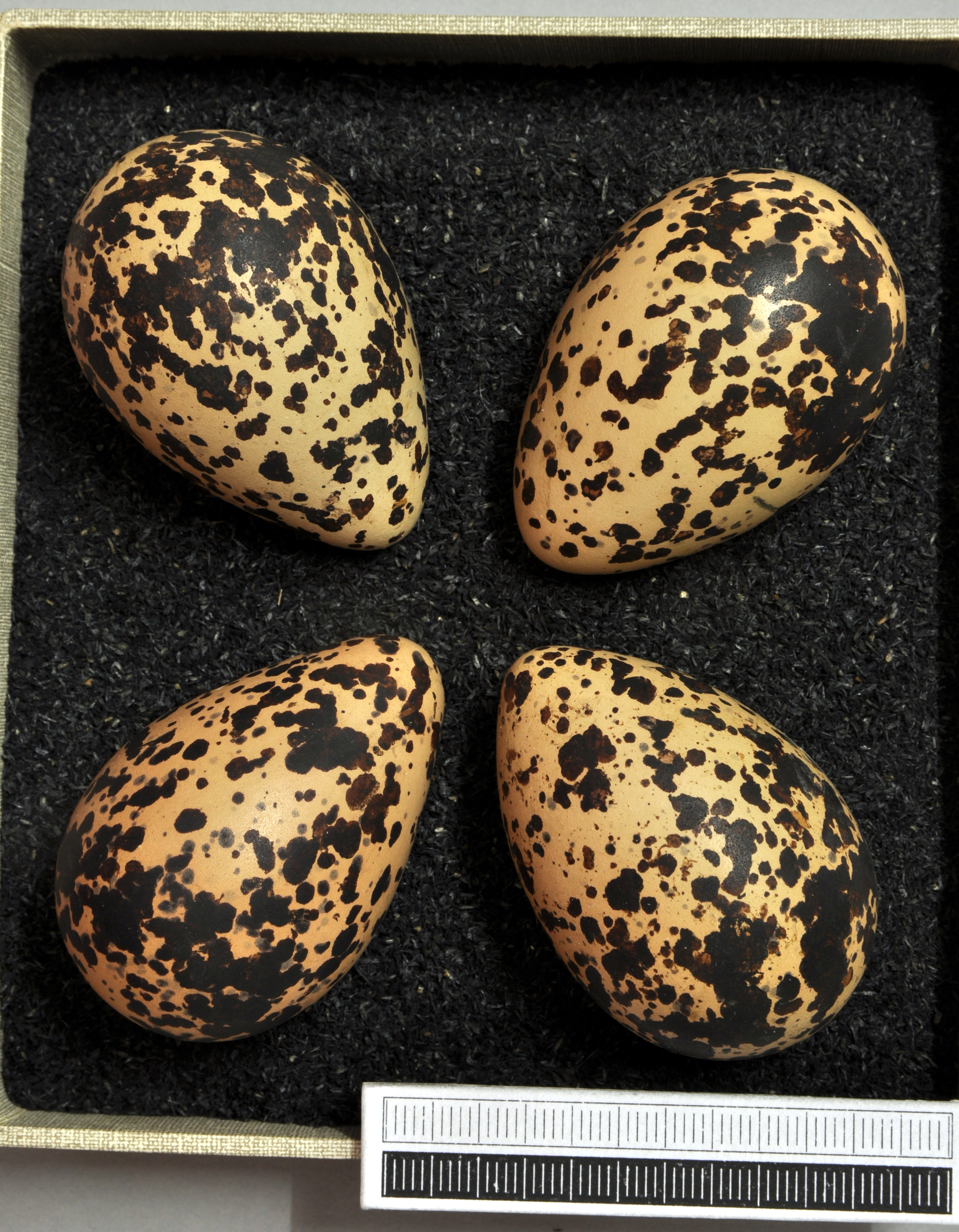
Eggs, Collection Museum Wiesbaden.
