= Ölfusá =

River in Iceland

- Aerial view of The Ölfusá and Selfoss

Physical characteristics
- Source: Confluence of the Hvítá and the Sog rivers
  - coordinates: 63°59′20.0″N 20°57′49.0″W
- Mouth: Atlantic Ocean
- Length: 25 km (16 mi)
- Basin size: 5,760 km^{2} (2,220 mi^{2})
- Discharge
  - average: 423 m^{3}/s (14,900 cu ft/s)

The Ölfusá (Icelandic pronunciation: [ˈœlvʏsˌauː]) is a river in Iceland. It begins at the junction between the Hvítá and Sog rivers, just north of the town of Selfoss, and flows for 25 km (16 mi) into the Atlantic Ocean. It is Iceland's largest river by volume with an average discharge of 423 m^{3}/s (14,900 cu ft/s). Its drainage basin is 5,760 km^{2} (2,220 sq mi). The Ölfusá is home to a large salmon fishing industry. The Flói Nature Reserve is located on its eastern shore near its mouth.

== See also ==
- List of rivers of Iceland
