= Helgi Tómasson (physician) =

Icelandic physician

Helgi Tómasson (25 September 1896 – 2 August 1958) was an Icelandic physician.

== Early life ==
Helgi was born on 25 September 25, 1896 in Vatnseyri, Patreksfjörður, Iceland to Dr. Tómas Helgason and Sigrid Lydia Thejle.

== Career ==
He was head physician at Kleppspítali psychiatric hospital from 1929, when the new building came into use, to his death on August 2, 1958.

From 1928 to 1936 he was the only practicing neuropsychiatrist in Iceland.

He prohibited physical restraints (such as straitjackets, restraining straps and belts), and also prohibited his patients from undergoing electroconvulsive therapy and lobotomy.

In 1930 he was involved in a controversy, called the Big bomb (Icelandic: Stóra bomban) when he raised concerns that Jónas Jónsson, the Icelandic Minister of Justice, was suffering from mental instability. The incident led to Helgi being fired from the Kleppspítali, although he later was reinstated as its head physician.

From 1938 to 1958, he served as Chief Scout of the scouting organisation Bandalag íslenskra skáta.

== Personal life ==
He was the father of Ragnhildur Helgadóttir, former minister of the Independence Party.
