= World Scout Moot =

Scouting event held every 4 years

- Date: 1931 onwards

The World Scout Moot is an event for senior members of Scouting movement and other young adult Scouts, gathering up to 5,000 people. Moots provide an opportunity for young adults in Scouting to meet, with the objective of improving their international understanding as citizens of the world. Moots are held every four years and are organized by the World Organization of the Scout Movement (WOSM).

Participants must be 18–25 years old at the time of the event. Scouts who are 26 or older can take part as International Service Team (IST) volunteer staff.

== History ==
"Moot" is an Old English word for a gathering. Rover Moots (older members were traditionally called Rovers) took place at provincial, national and international levels in the UK, Australia and Canada from the mid-1920s.

The first World Rover Moot was held in 1931 at Kandersteg, Switzerland, with subsequent events held every four years until 1939, when it was suspended due to World War II. They continued every four years after this until 1961, when the 7th World Rover Moot took place in Melbourne, Australia. Originally entitled the "World Rover Moot", the Moot was replaced by World Moot Years between 1965 and 1982. This was done with the aim of increasing the number of events and accessibility to Rovers.

In 1985, after lobbying led by Australia, the World Scout Conference decided to reinstate the World Rover Moot under a new name, World Scout Moot, to the calendar of world Scouting events, with the naming changed to reflect that not all countries had continued with a Rover section, notably the UK and the USA. At the World Scout Conference in January 1988, bids were presented by Australia and Switzerland, with Australia awarded the 8th World Scout Moot for Dec 1990/Jan 1991, and Switzerland granted the 9th World Scout Moot for July 1992. In 1993, it was decided to hold future Moots every four years. The 10th World Scout Moot was hosted by Sweden in 1996, the 11th World Scout Moot by Mexico in 2000, and the 12th World Scout Moot by Taiwan in 2004. After originally scheduled for 2008 in Mozambique, the 13th World Scout Moot was held in Kenya in 2010 – the first ever such event to take place in Africa.

The 14th World Scout Moot was hosted by Canada in 2013, while the 15th World Scout Moot was held in Iceland in the summer of 2017. The 16th World Scout Moot was due to take place in Ireland in 2021, however due to the COVID-19 pandemic the event was postponed to 2022 and subsequently cancelled. The 16th World Scout Moot was hosted by Portugal in July/August 2025, with the opening event taking place at Parque Tejo in Lisbon.

During the 2024 World Scout Conference in Cairo, Scouts of China (Taiwan) were successful in their bid to host the 17th World Scout Moot in 2029.

The 16th World Scout Moot in Portugal in July/August 2025 had a total attendance of 7,407 from 118 nations. 5,242 18-26 year old participants, 327 adult leaders, 1,370 International Service Team, 438 Planning and Management Team and 30 WOSM representatives.

== List of events ==
Year	Event	Location	Host country	Attendance	Countries/ regions attended
1931	1st World Rover Moot	Kandersteg	Switzerland	3,000	20
1935	2nd World Rover Moot	Ingarö	Sweden	3,000	26
1939	3rd World Rover Moot	Monzie Castle	United Kingdom	3,500	42
1949	4th World Rover Moot	Skjåk	Norway	2,500	40
1953	5th World Rover Moot	Kandersteg	Switzerland	4,168	41
1957	6th World Rover Moot	Sutton Coldfield	United Kingdom	3,500	61
1961	7th World Rover Moot	Melbourne	Australia	969	15
1990–91	8th World Scout Moot	Melbourne	Australia	1,000	36
1992	9th World Scout Moot	Kandersteg	Switzerland	1,400	52
1996	10th World Scout Moot	Ransberg Scout Centre	Sweden	2,608	78
2000	11th World Scout Moot	Teotihuacan	Mexico	5,000	71
2004	12th World Scout Moot	Hualien	Taiwan	2,500	85
2010	13th World Scout Moot	Nairobi	Kenya	1,924	66
2013	14th World Scout Moot	Low, Quebec	Canada	2,000	83
2017	15th World Scout Moot	Úlfljótsvatn	Iceland	5,000	106
2021	16th World Scout Moot	Malahide Castle	Ireland	Cancelled due to COVID-19	
2025	16th World Scout Moot	Lisbon and Porto	Portugal	7,407	118
2029	17th World Scout Moot	Tainan	Taiwan	TBA	TBA

== See also ==
- World Scout Indaba
