= Úlfljótsvatn Scout Center =

Coordinates: 64.096169°N 21.046223°W

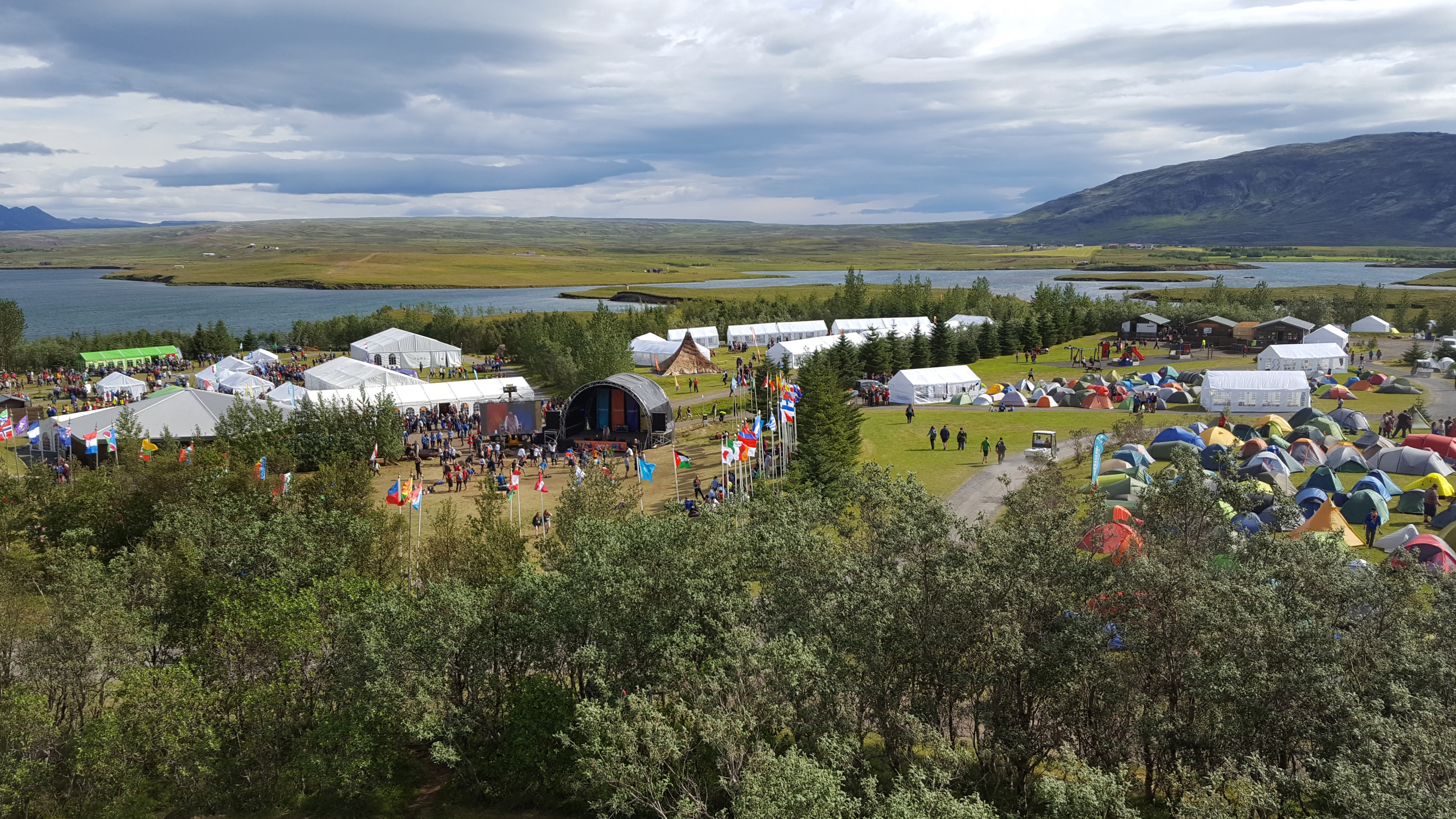
Úlfljótsvatn Scout Center during the 2017 World Scout Moot

Úlfljótsvatn Scout Center is the national Scout center of Bandalag íslenskra skáta, the Icelandic Scout and Guides Association.

It is situated by Lake Úlfljótsvatn, which lies just south of Lake Þingvallavatn. It is located approximately 70 km east of Reykjavík.

Various events take place there, such as Scout camps, Jamborees, courses and summer camps. It has a few buildings, including KSÚ, DSÚ, the JB-building, the Green Revolution and a 10 meter high tower for climbing and abseiling. It also has camping facilities which can host up to 5000 people.

The European Scout and Guide event Roverway 2009 took place at Úlfljótsvatn Scout Center.

The centre hosted the 15th World Scout Moot in 2017.

After the World Scout Moot the centre was temporarily closed due to a norovirus outbreak, causing more than 200 international scouts and leaders, predominantly from the United Kingdom, to become sick with norovirus. The evacuation of the site to a nearby school was the largest evacuation ever to occur in south Iceland.
