= Grímur Geitskör =

Grímur Geitskör (Grímur Goatshoe or Goatbeard) was responsible for establishing the Icelandic parliament Althing in what is now called the Assembly Plains or Þingvellir. In around 927-930 he made tour of Iceland and searched for the most appropriate place for the parliament. The place he chose was Bláskógar (the former name of Þingvellir) on the eastern edge of Þorsteinn Ingólfsson's estate. The location with its elevated cliff (part of the Atlantic ridge) and lake was chosen not only for its position with respect to important settlements but also because its owner had been found guilty of murder and had his land declared public. Grímur was the foster or half brother of Úlfljótr.

== Other sources ==
- Benediktsson, Jakob (1974) “Landnám og upphaf allsherjarríkis,” Saga Íslands 1, Reykjavík
- Wikisource:Íslendingabók: Section 3. On the establishment of the Alþingi (Accessed Feb 2011)
- Sigurður Líndal: “Sendiför Úlfljóts”, i Skírnir 143, 1969, s. 5–26
- Sveinbjörn Rafnsson: Studier i Landnámsbók. Kritiska bidrag till den isländska fristatens historia, Lund 1974
- H. Magerøy: biografi i NBL1, bd. 17, 1975
