= Bandalag íslenskra skáta =

National Scouting and Guiding organization of Iceland

- Country: Iceland
- Founded: 1912
- Membership: 3,750
- Chief Scout: Harpa Ósk Valgeirsdóttir
- Affiliation: World Association of Girl Guides and Girl Scouts, World Organization of the Scout Movement
- Website skatarnir.is

Bandalag íslenskra skáta (BIS, Icelandic Boy and Girl Scout Association) is the national Scouting and Guiding organization of Iceland. Scouting was founded in Iceland in 1912 and was among the earlier members of the World Organization of the Scout Movement in 1924. Guiding in Iceland was founded in 1922 and among the founding members of the World Association of Girl Guides and Girl Scouts.

The organization serves 1,756 Scouts (as of 2021) and 2,002 Guides (as of 2003) in 35 troops.

== History ==
Scouting was introduced in Iceland as early as 1911, when Ingvar Ólafsson, who had entered the Scout Movement in Denmark, formed the first Boy Scout patrol. At that time Iceland was a part of the Danish Crown, enjoying Home Rule only since 1904. A growing feeling of nationalism striving for independence for the country led many societies and movements to look for guidance and motives in other countries than Denmark. This is true for the Scout Movement as in 1912 the leaders of Icelandic Scouting turned to the English original and Scouting for Boys as their model for Icelandic Scouting.

The first council, Skátafelag Reykjavíkur (The Scout Society of Reykjavík) was established on November 2, 1912, and many of the members of the first Scout patrol became founding members of this new council, which operated in Reykjavík. A new Scout group was formed on April 23, 1913 with members from the Reykjavík YMCA. In 1916 a group was formed in Stykkishólmur, 1917 in Akureyri to be followed with groups in the principal towns of Hafnarfjörður, Eyrarbakki, Akranes and Ísafjörður.

Guiding commenced on July 7, 1922 as the YWCA established a group of Girl Guides.

A National Association was formed in 1925. The first Chief Scout was Axel V. Tulinius, (1925–1938) followed by Dr. Helgi Tómasson (1938–1958), Jónas B. Jónsson (1958–1971), Páll Gíslason (1971–1981), Ágúst Þorsteinsson (1981–1988), Gunnar H. Eyjólfsson (1988–1993) and Ólafur Ásgeirsson (1993–2005). In 1981, Mr. Gislason was awarded the Bronze Wolf, the only distinction of the World Organization of the Scout Movement, awarded by the World Scout Committee for exceptional services to world Scouting. In 2005, Margrét Tómasdóttir became the first female Chief Scout.

As Iceland became an independent kingdom in personal union with Denmark in 1918, it was possible for Icelanders and Icelandic associations to join international organizations. One of the first associations of the new kingdom to do this, was the Boy Scout Association, which joined the World Movement in 1924. The Icelandic Girl Guides joined the WAGGGS in 1928. Icelandic Scouts have been present at all International Jamborees since Ermelunden in 1924.

Scouting had a firm start in Iceland and grew fast during the thirties as in 1940 the number of Scouts and Guides was around 3,000, out of population of 130,000. In 1938 the Icelandic Scouts and Guides made history as the first joint councils of Boy Scouts and Girl Guides were formed in Keflavík and Vestmannaeyjar.

In 1939 the Girl Guide Association was formed with Jakobína Magnúsdóttir as Chief Commissioner and the Crown Princess Ingirid as patron. And again the Icelandic Scouts and Guides made Scout history when they formed the first joint association of Scouts and Guides in the world in 1944.

The Icelandic Scout and Guide Association is an active movement in Iceland tending to their own training and program needs. The first Scout handbook appeared in Icelandic in 1919 and easily adapting Baden-Powell's ideas to the possibilities of this country. Scout Magazines have been published since 1919, the one run by the National Association, Skátablaðið, has been published since 1935.

In 1942 the association leased the farm Úlfljótsvatn near Reykjavík, which has ever since been the center of training and camping activities. A new center at Hamrar near Akureyri in the northern part of Iceland has been built within the last decade.

Icelandic Scouts have been very active in international Scouting, working together with the Nordic countries, effective in the preparation of the Nordjamb 1975 (World Scout Jamboree in Norway), and participating in annual program prepared by the Nordic Scout Council.

== Jamborees ==
National Jamborees have been an integral part of Icelandic Scouting starting in 1925. At first, they were held every four years and now they are normally triennial. Recent ones are:

Year	Location	Theme
1996	Úlfljótsvatn Scout Center	On a Viking Trail
1999	Úlfljótsvatn Scout Center	Sing your own song
2002	Hamrar, Akureyri	Elves and trolls
2005	Úlfljótsvatn Scout Center	Earth's Energy
2008	Hamrar, Akureyri	On a Viking Trail
2012	Úlfljótsvatn Scout Center	Centennial of Scouting in Iceland
2014	Hamrar, Akureyri	In Tune With Time
2016	Úlfljótsvatn Scout Center	The Great Expedition
2024	Úlfljótsvatn Scout Center	Different Worlds
2026	Hamrar, Akureyri	

== Program sections ==
- Fjölskylduskátar (i.e. Family Scouts) - for families
- Hrefnuskátar (i.e. Whale Scouts) - ages 5 to 7
- Drekaskátar (i.e. Dragon Scouts) - ages 7 to 9
- Fálkaskátar (i.e. Falcon Scouts) - ages 10 to 12
- Dróttskátar -(i.e. King's Court Scouts) ages 13 to 15
- Rekkaskátar (i.e. Ranger Scouts) - ages 16 to 18
- Róverskátar (i.e. Rover Scouts) - ages 19 to 25
- Eldri skátar (i.e. Older scouts) - ages 25+
- Rescue Teams - ages 17 and up

The Scout Motto is Ávallt viðbúinn, Always Prepared.

== International Scouting units in Iceland ==
- In addition, there were American Boy Scouts in Keflavík, linked to the Direct Service branch of the Boy Scouts of America, which supports units around the world.
