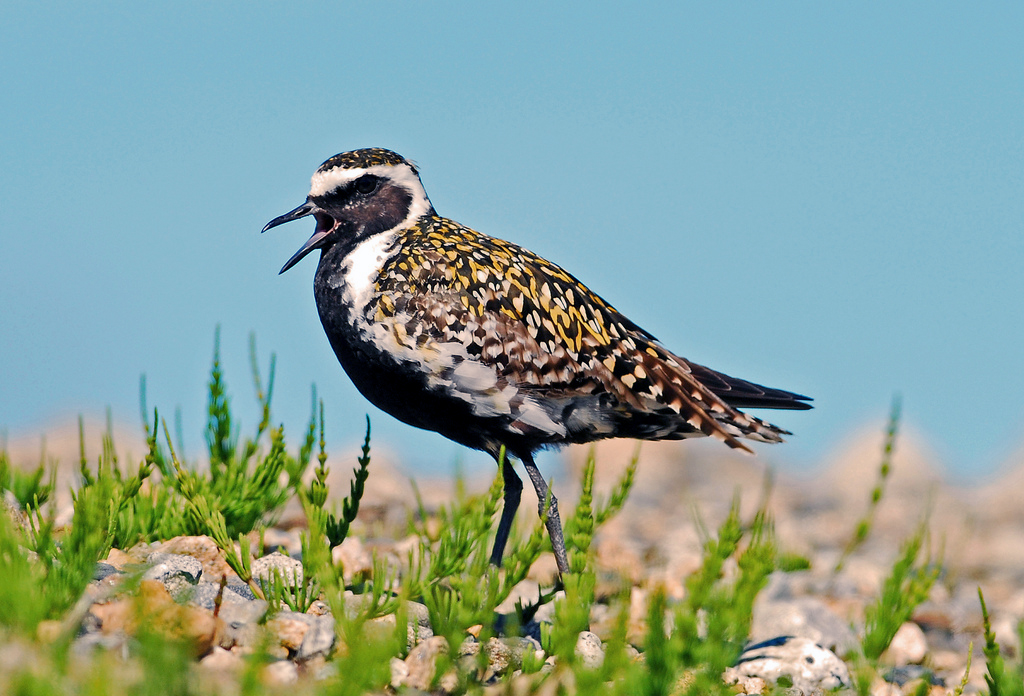
- In breeding plumage at Bering Land Bridge National Preserve, Alaska
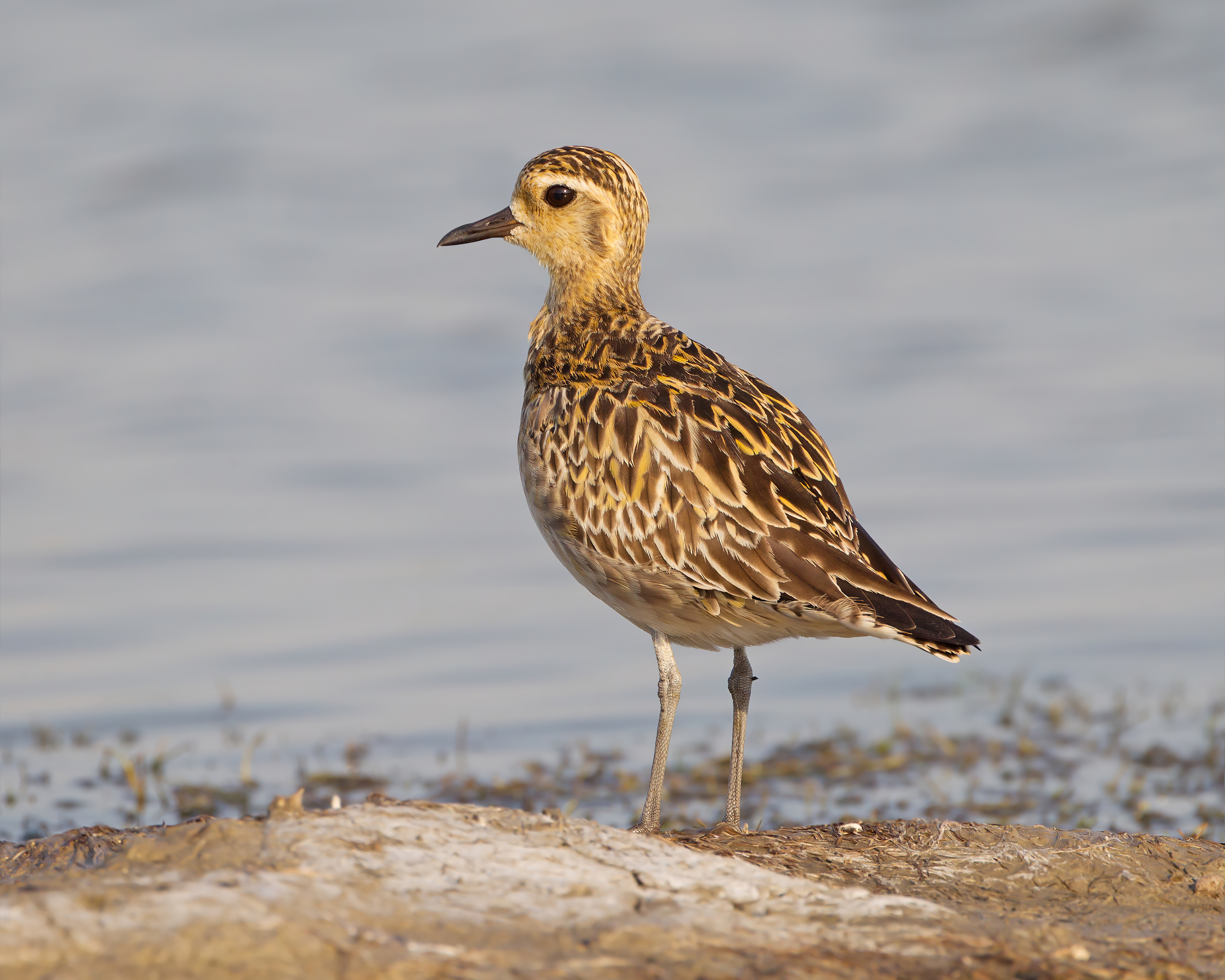
- In non-breeding plumage at Laem Pak Bia, Thailand

Conservation status
- Least Concern (IUCN 3.1)

Scientific classification
- Kingdom: Animalia
- Phylum: Chordata
- Class: Aves
- Order: Charadriiformes
- Family: Charadriidae
- Genus: Pluvialis
- Species: P. fulva

Binomial name
- Pluvialis fulva (Gmelin, JF, 1789)
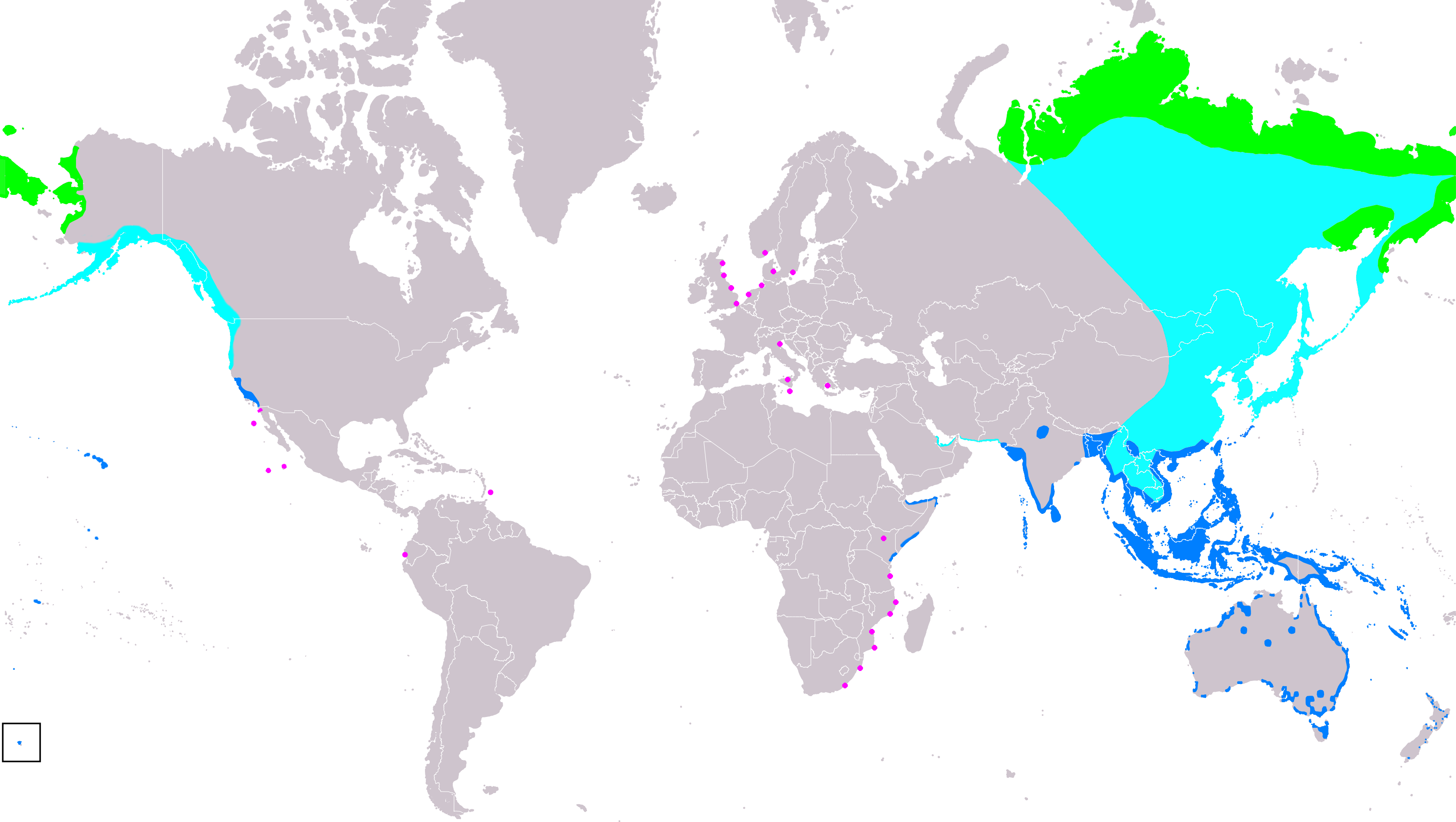
- Range of P. fulva Breeding Passage Non-breeding Vagrant (seasonality uncertain)

Synonyms
- Charadrius fulvus Pluvialis dominica fulva

= Pacific golden plover =

Species of bird

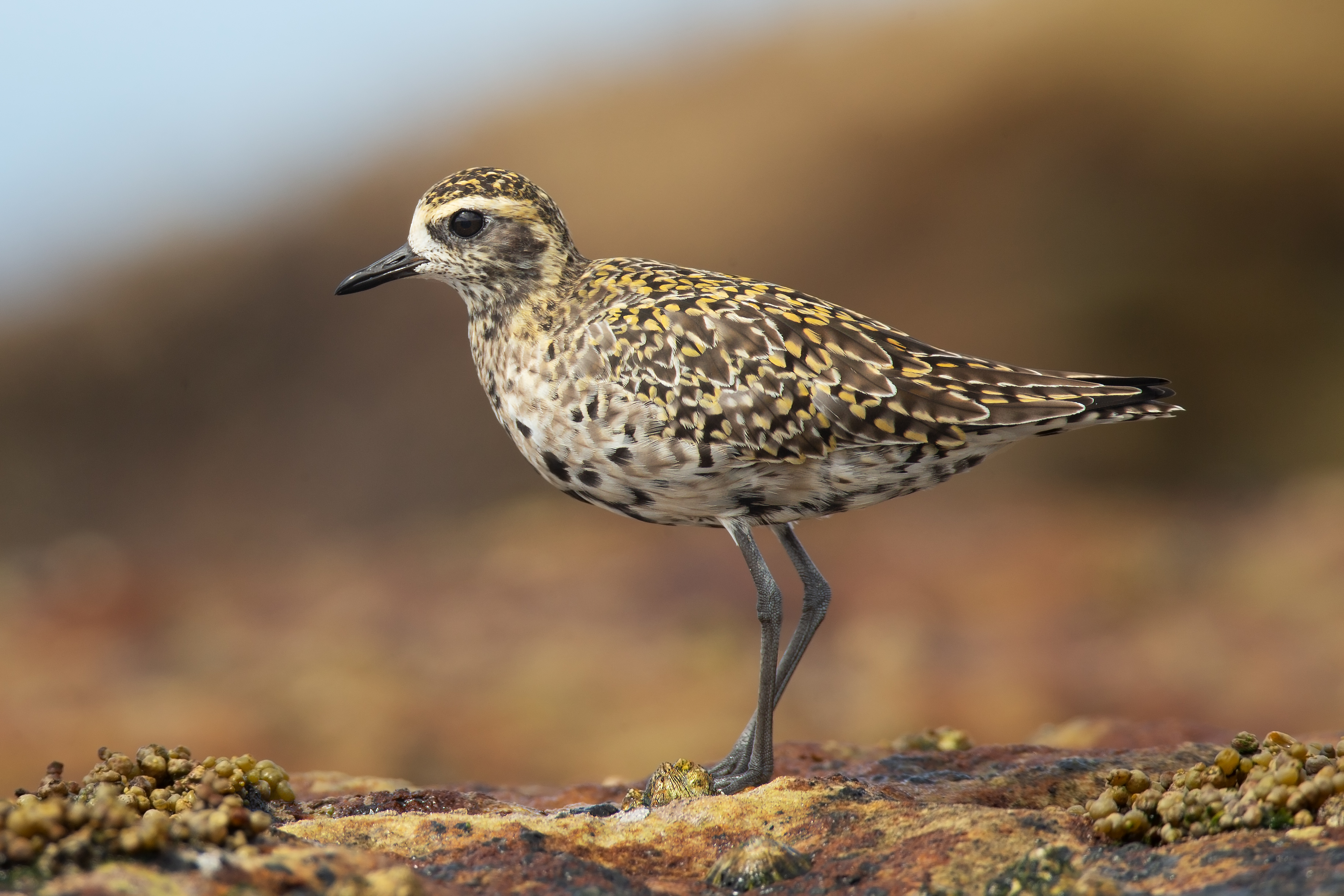
In transition from non-breeding to breeding plumage

Pluvialis fulva in Hawaii

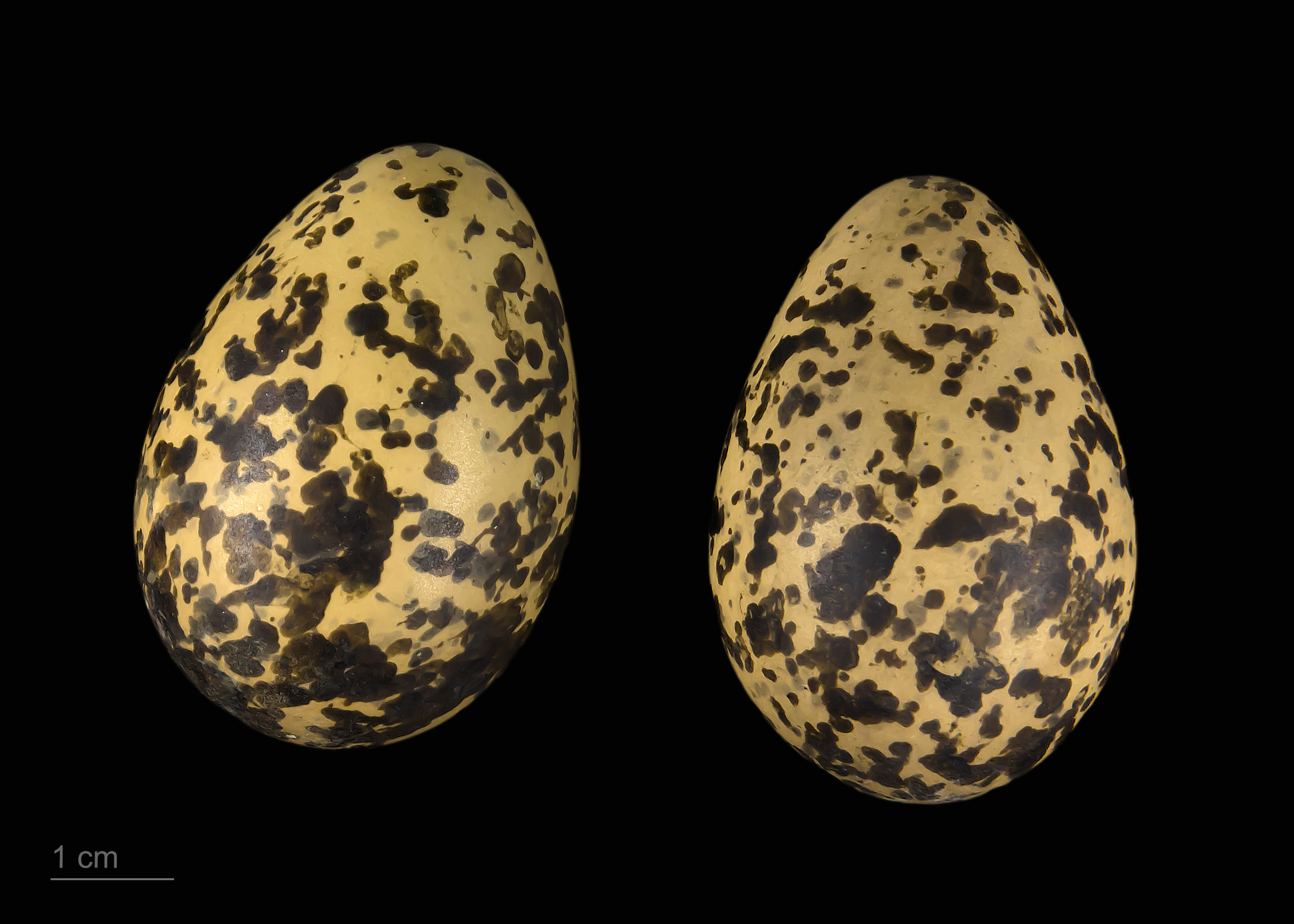
Pluvialis fulva—MHNT

The Pacific golden plover (Pluvialis fulva) is a migratory shorebird that breeds during summer in Alaska and Siberia. During nonbreeding season, this medium-sized plover migrates widely across the Pacific.

== Taxonomy ==
The Pacific golden plover was formally described in 1789 by the German naturalist Johann Friedrich Gmelin in his revised and expanded edition of Carl Linnaeus's Systema Naturae. He placed it with the other plovers in the genus Charadrius and coined the binomial name Charadrius fulvus. Gmelin based his description on the "Fulvous plover" that had been described in 1785 by the English ornithologist John Latham from specimens from Tahiti. The Pacific golden plover is now placed in the genus Pluvialis that was introduced by the French zoologist Mathurin Jacques Brisson in 1760. The genus name is Latin and means relating to rain, from pluvia, 'rain'. It was believed that the plovers flocked when rain was imminent. The specific epithet is also from Latin and means 'tawny' or 'yellowish-brown'. The species is monotypic: no subspecies are recognised.

== Description ==
Adults are about 25 cm (9.8 in) long with a wingspan averaging 61 cm (24 in) At their lightest, fat free, the birds weigh around 135 g (4.8 oz) In March, the birds begin gaining weight. Before leaving for their Arctic breeding grounds, the birds weigh about 200 g (7.1 oz).

In breeding plumage, the male is spotted gold and black on the crown, back, and wings. Face and neck are black bordered with white, breast is black, rump is dark. Bill is black, legs are gray to black. Female similar but black breast mottled and less distinct.

In nonbreeding plumage, sexes look identical. The black on the face and breast bordered by white is replaced with dark brown, gray, and yellowish patterning and lighter underparts.

Molt to breeding plumage begins in March and April, prior to migration. Molt to nonbreeding plumage begins in the Arctic during egg incubation.

Downy chicks are spotted gold and black on head and back with whitish yellow underparts. Legs and feet are adult size at hatching.

Similar birds are the European golden plover, Pluvialis apricaria, and the American golden plover, Pluvialis dominica. The Pacific golden plover is more similar to the American golden plover, with which it was once considered the lesser golden plover. The Pacific golden plover is slimmer than the American golden plover, has longer legs, and usually has more yellow on the back.

== Distribution and habitat ==
The Pacific golden plover is migratory, and breeds during May, June, and July in Alaska and Siberia. It migrates south to Asia, Australasia, and Pacific islands in August and September, and stays until April or May. It is a rare vagrant to western Europe.

Although a shorebird, the Pacific golden plover feeds mostly inland, preferring open spaces with short vegetation. During the breeding season, the Arctic tundra provides insects and berries for food, and effective camouflage for predator avoidance.

In Hawaii, Pacific golden plovers, known locally as kōlea, have adapted remarkably to human presence and to human alteration of the natural environment including, backyards, parks, cemeteries, rooftops, pastures, and golf courses. Because kōlea are site-faithful, each bird returns to, and defends, the same territory year after year, resulting in people observing the comings and goings of the kōlea with special interest. Some observers name and feed their birds, and some birds become tame around their caretakers. The oldest kōlea recorded lived to be at least 21 years, 3 months; its age was unknown at banding.

Kōlea are the subject of a Hawaii Audubon Society's citizen science project called Kōlea Count, www.koleacount.org. The birds' habit of returning to the same territory each year allows scientists in Hawaiʻi to attach tiny light level geolocator devices to the birds and retrieve them the following year in the same location. Such research showed that the birds made the 3,000 miles (4,800 km) nonstop flight between Alaska and Hawaiʻi in three to four days.

Pacific golden plovers gather in flocks some days prior to migrating north, and fly at altitudes of about 3,000 ft (910 m) to as high as 16,000 ft (4,900 m). Some birds do not migrate. These are usually first-year, older, injured individuals, or birds without enough fat reserves to make the journey.

== Behavior and ecology ==
=== Breeding ===
The Pacific golden plover breeds in Arctic tundra areas of Siberia and western Alaska. Males usually arrive first, possibly returning to, and defending, the same territory each year. Some males and females appear to arrive paired. Females have been observed searching for breeding partners on the tundra. The male builds a nest of lichen, moss, and grasses, in shallow scrapes on the ground in a dry open area. The female lays 4 eggs, buff-colored with splotches of black and brown. Both male and female share incubation, care of young, and defense from foxes and avian predators.

Soon after hatching, chicks leave the nest to forage, returning to the parent birds to seek warmth and shelter. When juveniles are capable of flight around 26–28 days after hatching, parent birds begin leaving to migrate south. Females usually depart first. Flocks of juveniles remain, making the migration sometimes as late as October and November depending on Arctic weather. First-year birds migrate by instinct, confronting the vagaries of weather during their long southward flights. Once landed, they must compete with each other and established adults for foraging ground.

=== Food and feeding ===
It forages on tundra, in mowed grass, and on beaches and tidal flats, eating nearly anything that crawls including insects, spiders, mollusks, crustaceans, and small reptiles, as well as berries, leaves, and seeds. Foraging pace is a repeated run-stop-peck. Most wintering birds feed singly within an established territory. Non-territorial birds feed in loose groups.

== Conservation ==
The IUCN Red List of Threatened Species dated 10/01/16 assessed the Pacific golden plover to be a species of Least Concern globally. However, the population trend is decreasing, the main threat being a global shift in habitat and alteration due to climate change and severe weather.
