= List of Scouting memorials =

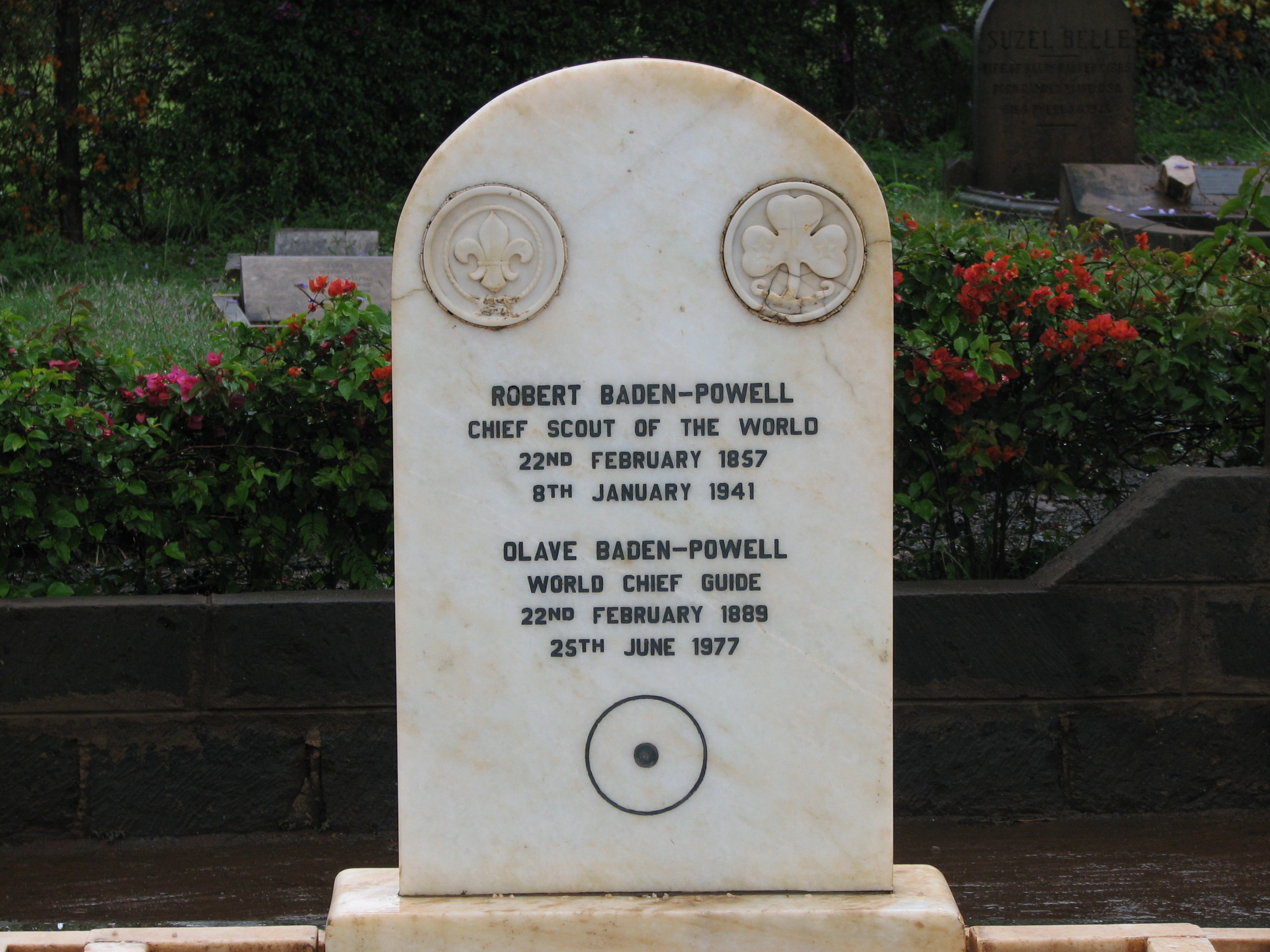
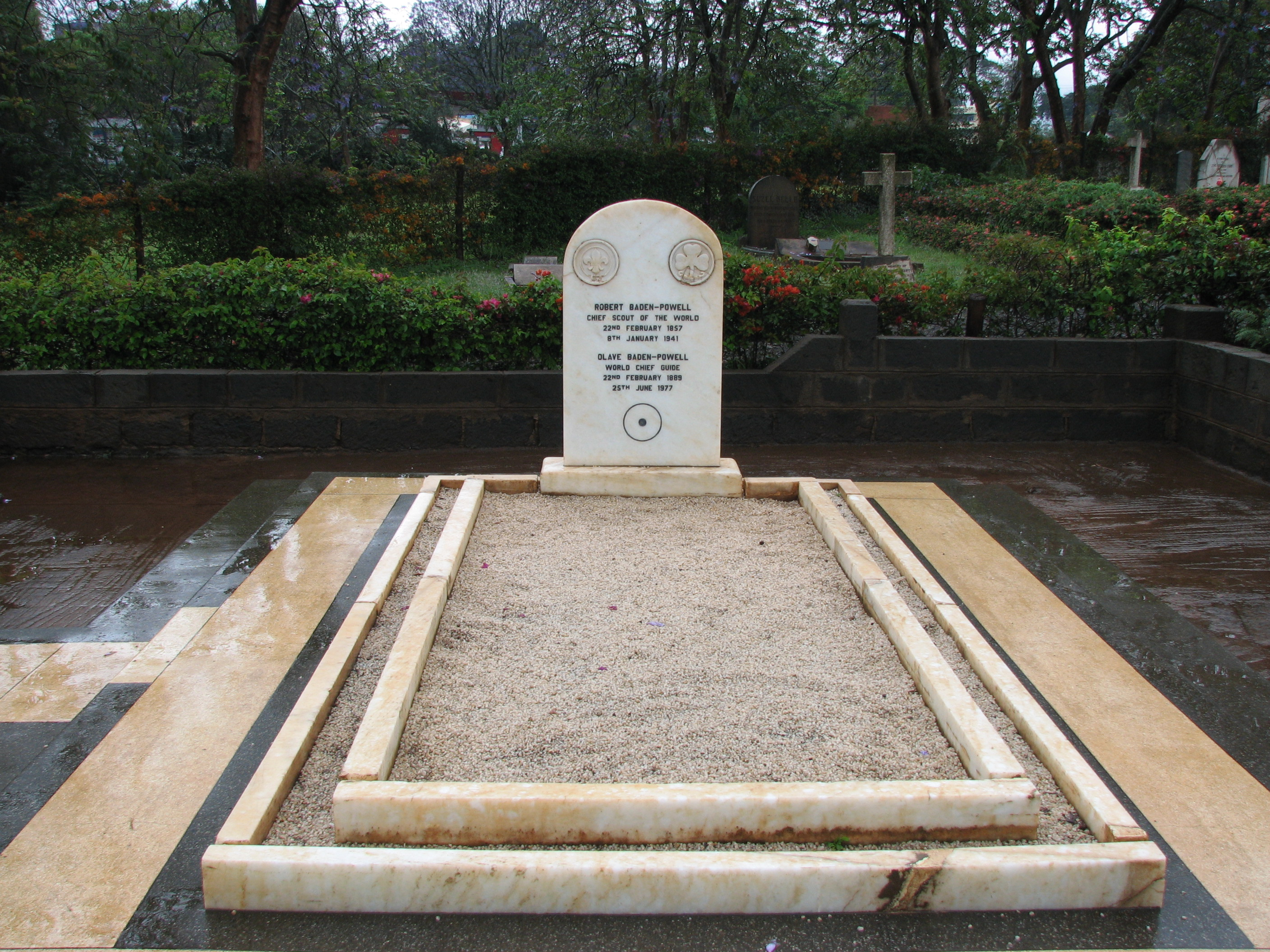
- Baden-Powell grave Baden-Powell grave – Nyeri, Kenya, near Mount Kenya

Since the birth and expansion of the Scout movement in the first decade of the 20th century, many Scouting memorials, monuments and gravesites have been erected throughout the world.

== Africa ==
=== Kenya ===
- Baden-Powell grave – Wajee Nature Park, Nyeri, Kenya, near Mount Kenya. His gravestone bears a circle with a dot in the center, which is the Boy Scout trail sign for "I have gone home": 0.41878°S 36.95022°E
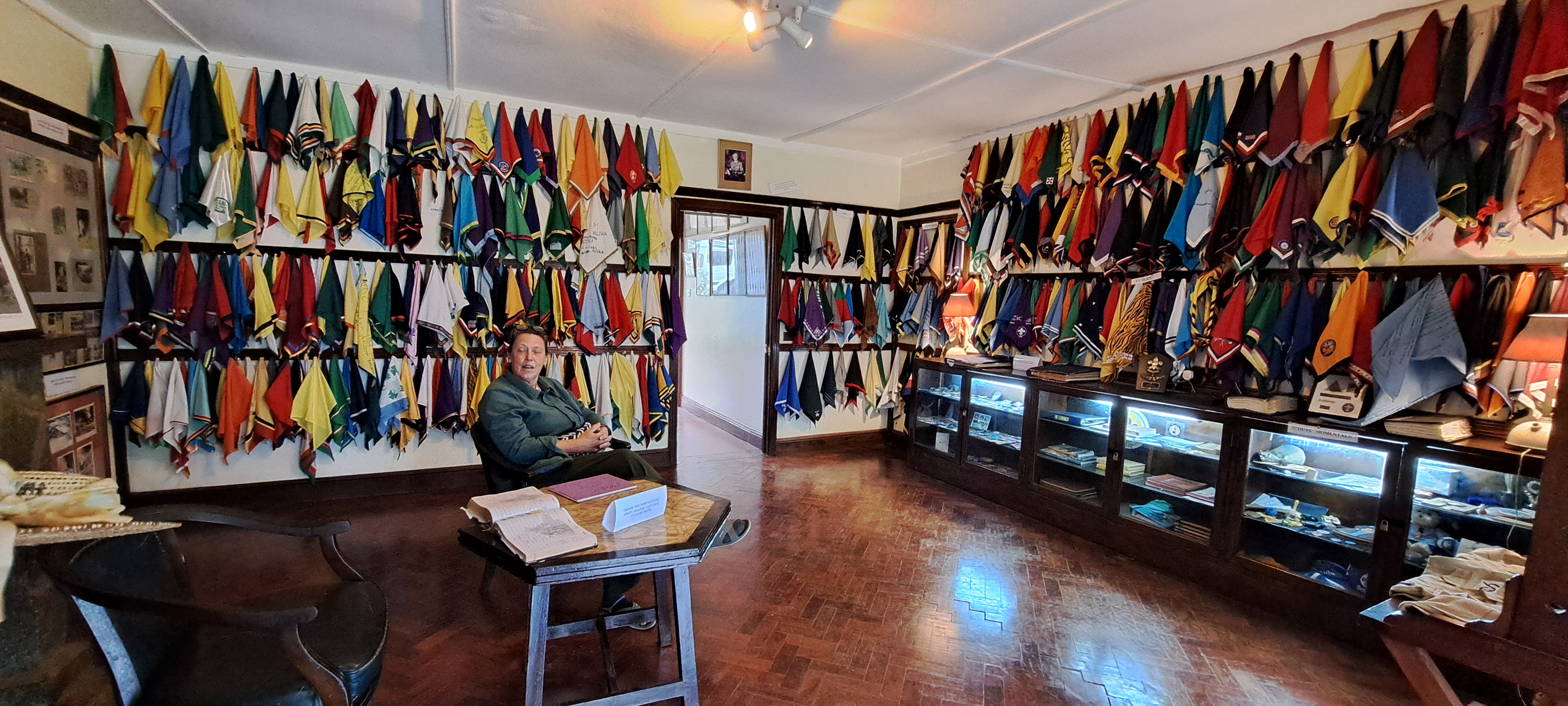
- Work room of Baden-Powell in his Paxtu cottage, now museum with scarfs from all over the world
  Baden-Powell "Paxtu" Cottage – On the grounds of the "Outspan Hotel", Nyeri, Kenya 0.421970°S 36.937220°E
- A museum is also under construction only a few hundred yards away from Baden Powel's gravesite. The museum is being funded by a joint effort between WSO nations to create an international scouting heritage center.
- A commemorative stamp featuring Lord Baden-Powell's Paxtu cottage and Lady Baden-Powell has been issued by Kenya.

== Asia ==
=== Japan ===
- This statue in Yokohama is a memorial to the Unknown Scout Soldier, representing a true story during a fierce battle in Okinawa during World War II. The inscription on the memorial reads as follows "This statue is a memorial of a true story of a fierce battle in World War II, which happened on an island in the South Pacific Ocean somewhere. An American soldier was seriously wounded, and he was lying where he had fallen. The sound of gunfire stopped, and the surroundings quieted down. He heard someone's footsteps approaching him. A Japanese soldier who had a gun with a bayonet was standing over him when he opened his eyes. He thought that he was going to be killed by the Japanese soldier, and he fainted. After a while, he woke up. He found a white slip of paper on the sand by his side, and he put it in his pocket. He was carried on a stretcher to the field operations aid station soon after that. When he was put on the operating table, he remembered the slip of paper in his pocket, and gave it to the doctor. It was a message from the Japanese soldier, and was as follows: "When I was about to kill you, you made the three fingered Scout salute. I am a Scout. A Scout is a brother. Therefore, I could not kill any person who lost the fighting spirit. I tended to your wound. Good luck!" After the war, the American soldier and his father visited the Boy Scout headquarters in the United States, and told this story. They donated money for the Boy Scouts to put up a monument to the Scouting Spirit. In 1952, Mr. Finnel came to inspect the Boy Scout movement of Japan from the headquarters in the United States and passed on this true story as a fine anecdote from during the war. The American soldier's name is not known. The Japanese soldier was killed. This monument is to the Unknown Scout Soldier. This is an example of the Scout Spirit of Japan."

=== Nepal ===
- Baden-Powell Peak

=== Philippines ===
- Tacloban – Statue of a Boy Scout giving the Scout sign, at the middle of a street intersection. Reputed to be the first Boy Scout monument in the Philippines.
- Quezon City – The 11th World Scout Jamboree Memorial at the intersection of Tomas Morato Street and Timog Avenue. The monument was erected to the memory of the twenty Scouts and four Scouters who died in a plane crash in the sea off Bombay, India on their way to Marathon, Greece. Streets in the surrounding area have each been named for one of the 24 Jamboree delegates. The South Triangle district is often called "Scout Area". A barangay in the vicinity is named Barangay Laging Handa, "Laging Handa" being the Scout motto of the Boy Scouts of the Philippines. 14.6348056°N 121.035361°E
- Manila – The Boy Scout Cenotaph at the entrance of Manila North Cemetery, also in memory of the ill-fated 11th World Scout Jamboree contingent. It contains marble plaques donated by various Scout organizations from around the world. The cenotaph features a giant concrete hand giving the Scout Sign, with a cross in the middle.
- Colegio de San Juan de Letran monument to Scouts Ramon Valdes Albano, Henry Cabrera Chuatoco, and Wilfredo Mendoza Santiago, who perished with the BSP contingent to the 11th World Scout Jamboree.
- 28 July designated Scouts Memorial Day by Proclamation 293 signed by President Corazon Aquino.
- Scout monument commemorating the 12th National BSP Jamboree held in Palo, Leyte, in 2001.
- Statue of Valeriano Abello in Telegrafó, Leyte.
- Signal Day on 18 October observed annually in Tolosa, Leyte.
- Street in La Loma, Quezon City, named after Scout Oscar M. Alcaraz.
- Monument to Oscar M. Alcaraz at Eulogio Rodriguez Jr. High School, Mayon Avenue, La Loma, Quezon City.
- Name of McCormick-Gepigon Sulu Council, Boy Scouts of the Philippines, named after Scouter Scott McCormick and Scout Cesar Gepigon who were killed on 25 December 1941 in Jolo by invading Japanese.
- 10th World Scout Jamboree memorial, Philippine Scouting Center, University of the Philippines, Los Baños, Laguna.
- 1st Asia-Pacific Scout Jamboree marker, Philippine Scouting Center, University of the Philippines, Los Baños, Laguna.

== Europe ==
=== Austria ===
==== Lower Austria ====
- Saint George Chapel in Berndorf (German: Georgskapelle), erected by the Scout Group and Old Scout Guild of Berndorf, inaugurated on 19 October 1983.
- Commemorative plaque in Neulengbach, commemorating the first Scoutcamps of Austria in Neulengbach during World War I
- Commemorative stone in the Scoutcenter Strandburg Silbersee in Höflein, commemorating all deceased Scouts of the Österreichischer Pfadfinderbund
- Commemorative stone in Klosterneuburg, Buchberg, commemorating the National Jamboree in 1991
- Commemorative plaque in Neunkirchen, commemorating 100 years of Scouting on a place named Pfadfinderwiese
- Guild-Scout-Way (German: Gilde-Pfadfinder-Weg), Amstetten, Quarter Ulmerfeld, there is a Way of the Cross erected by the local Guild Scouts with paintings of the founder of the local Scout Group
- "Boy Scouts Street" (German: Pfadfinderweg) in Gloggnitz
- "Boy Scouts Street" (German: Pfadfinderweg) in Laa an der Thaya
- "Boy Scouts Street" (German: Pfadfinderweg) in Amstetten
- Commemorative stone in Gloggnitz, commemorating Johannes Österreicher. Johannes Österreicher founded the Scout group in Gloggnitz in 1928 and served as chaplain of this Catholic Scout group. The Commemorative stone was erected in June 2008 by the local Guild Scouts.
- Franz Renner Bridge(German: Franz Renner-Brücke) in the Scout Campsite in the Urltal, commemorating Franz Renner longtime Group Scoutmaster of Waidhofen an der Ybbs.

==== Salzburg ====
- Großarl,
  - "Europetable" (German: Europatisch) commemorating Robert Baden-Powell and the a United Europe
  - "Heavenknot" (German: Himmelsknoten) – wooden reef knot with ISGF badge
  - Scout Salute
- Commemorative stone in Oberndorf, commemorating all Scouts of the group, who died during World War II
- Gravesite of Karl "Kara" Barteis, Anthering.
- Gravesite of Clemens Röbl OFM, Bruck an der Glocknerstraße Clemens Röbl was an important Scoutmaster for Catholic Scouting in Tyrol and Carinthia.
- "Boy Scouts Street" (German: Pfadfinderweg) in Salzburg, a street next to the house where Emmerich Teuber lived
- Untersberg, there is a Gipfelkreuz (cross on the summit of a mountain), called Roverkreuz (Rover cross), erected in 1962. The cross was made by the Scout group Salzburg 6 Maxglan. In 2012 a commemorative plaque for Schurli Sturm senior, one of the Scouts from Maxglan was added.

==== Styria ====
- Baden-Powell-Avenue (German: Baden-Powell-Allee), Graz
- Fürstenfeld,
  - "Boy Scouts Street" (German: Pfadfinderweg) in
  - memorial commemorating the founder of the Scout group of the city Franz Schragen. The memorial was erected in 1978.
- Limberg bei Wies, Commemorative plaque in the yard of the Castle Limberg, commemorating Josef Dolschek. He was an important Scoutleader in Styria and administrator of the castle.
- Straß, Commemorative stone commemorating the first Scouting activities in Austria in 1909

==== Tyrol ====
- Innsbruck – a memorial for all deceased scouts of Tyrol, it is located at the Tummelplatz in Amras.
- Glotzen (a mountain near Wattens), there is a Gipfelkreuz (cross on the summit of a mountain) made by the Scout group of Wattens, Glotzen, erected in 1958. It shows a Fleur-de-lis.
- Malgrübler (a mountain in the Voldertal), there is a Gipfelkreuz called Scout cross (German: Pfadfinderkreuz). It was erected in 1957 commemorating the 100th birthday of the Founder from the Scout group of Hall in Tirol.
- Helm (a mountain in East Tyrol on the border to South Tyrol), there is a Gipfelkreuz erected in 1958, made by Josef Tschurtschenthaler and erected by Scouts from Germany, Italy, Switzerland, France, Spain, Belgium and the Netherlands.
- Gilfert (a mountain in the Tux Alps), there is a Gipfelkreuz, commemorating the Scout Hermann Scherer from the Scout group Innsbruck 7. He died on the Gilfert through an avalanche in January 1959. The cross was erected in October 1959.

==== Upper Austria ====
- At the site of the 7th World Scout Jamboree, Bad Ischl, are 3 memorial stones. One for the Jamboree, two for the Reunions 1991 and 2001
- Commemorative plaque in Mauthausen-Gusen concentration camp, commemorating members of the Scouts et Guides de France and ZHP, who died in this concentration camp
- Lohnsburg, Rover Scouts of the Catholic Scouts of Europe renovate a chapel. It is named Chapel of the mercifulness of god (German: Kapelle zur Göttlichen Barmherzigkeit). On the top of the tower is cross that looks like the emblem of the Union Internationale des Guides et Scouts d'Europe
- "Boy Scouts Street" (German: Pfadfinderweg) in Freistadt
- Boy Scouts Square (German: Pfadfinderplatz) in Enns.

==== Vienna ====
- Commemorative plaque in Vienna, Apostelgasse 9, commemorating one of the first Austrian Scout troops
- Commemorative stone in Vienna, Rathauspark commemorating 10th World Conference of ISGF in 1973.
- Commemorative plaque in Vienna, Kahlenbergdörfl commemorating all deceased Austrian Scouts and Girl Guides
- Commemorative plaque in Vienna, Laxenburger Straße 111, commemorating one of the first Austrian Scout troops, founded in 1911 by the Hungarian priest Köhler.
- Gravesite of Emmerich Teuber and Wilhelm Teuber-Weckersdorf, Dornbacher Friedhof, Gruppe III, Grave Number 9, Vienna
- Gravesite of the Scoutmaster Karl Ludwig "Karolus" Slonek, Zentralfriedhof, Gate III, Gruppe VIII, Reihe 4, Grave Number 19
- Gravesite of the Karl "Dadi" Prohazka und Helene "Lona" Prohazka, Karl "Dadi" Prohazka served as Chief Scout of the Österreichischer Pfadfinderbund 1950–1982 and Honorary Chief Scout 1982–1990, Chair of the Österreichischer Jugendherbergenverband 1946–1976 he joined Scouting in 1914, his wife Lona served as a Cub Leader and International Commissioner of the Bund Österreichischer Pfadfinderinnen 1948–1950, Sieveringer Friedhof, Abteilung II, Gruppe 10, Grave Number 29
- DDr. Heinrich Maier Street (German: DDr. Heinrich Maier Straße), Vienna
- Johann-Petrak-Street (German: Johann-Petrak-Gasse), Vienna, Johann Petrak was an important Scoutmaster in Vienna. He founded 6 Scout troops in Vienna and was also active in underground Scouting during the German occupation.
- Baden-Powell-Square (German: Baden-Powell-Platz), in a park in the 22nd district of Vienna.
- Roman Köhler Bridge (German: Roman-Köhler-Steg), Handelskai near the Hilton Hotel, commemorating the teacher and Scoutmaster Roman Köhler, he served as a Scoutmaster from 1930 to 1968 and also volunteered in several jobs on regional and national level within Vienesse and Austrian Scouting.

=== Czech Republic ===
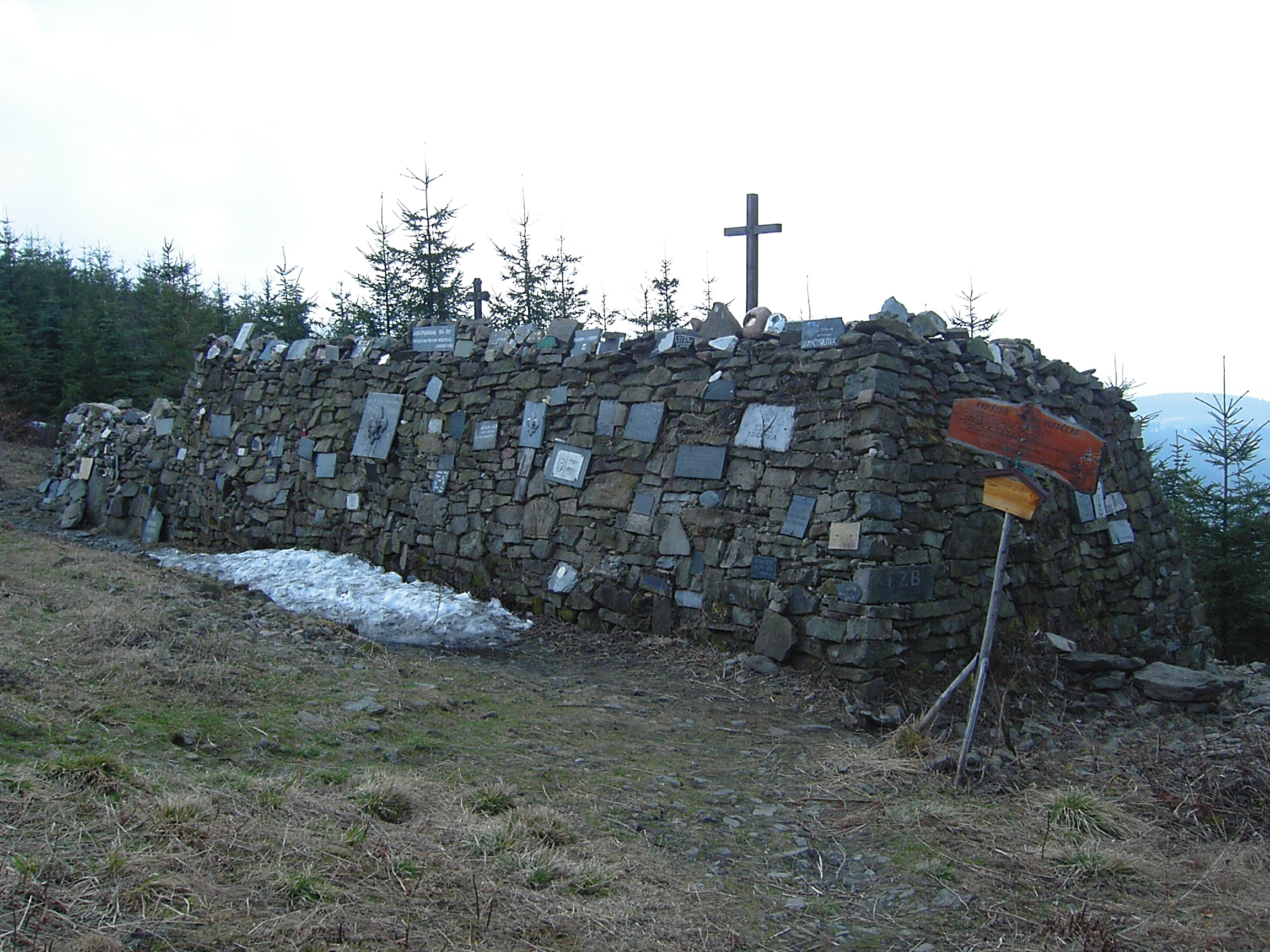
Ivančena stone mound

- The stone mound at Ivančena on Lysá hora was founded in 1946 as a memorial to a group of Scouts who were executed in April 1945 in Cieszyn, Poland, for their part in anti-Nazi resistance. It is continuously being expanded: visitors contribute rocks from all parts of the world.

=== Denmark ===
- A plaquette on the former building of Gammel Hellerup Gymnasium – the school where the first scout patrol was formed.
- A memorial stone at Ermelunden – the site of the 2nd World Scout Jamboree in 1924
- A memorial stone at the training center Hylkedam over the 27 DDS-scouts, that lost their lives during the WW2 resistance.

=== Germany ===
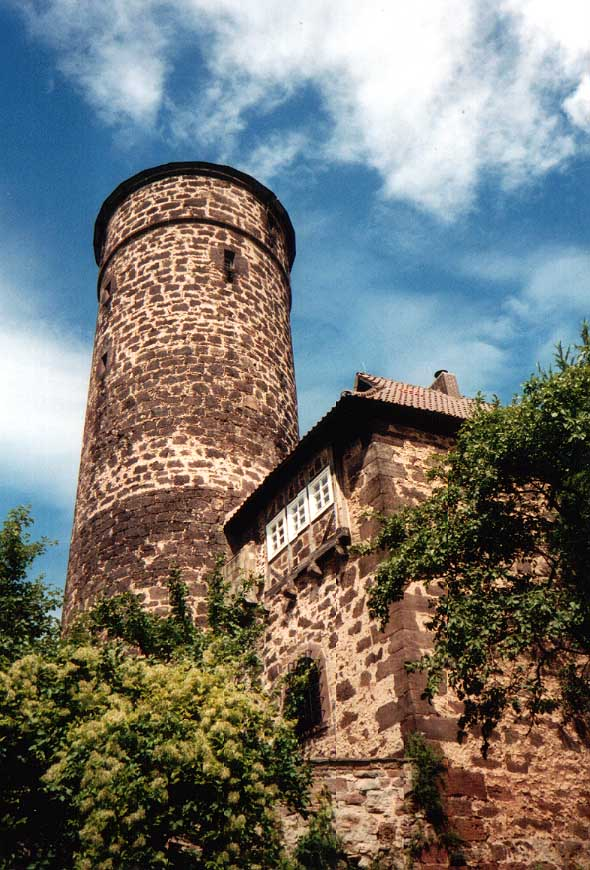
Castle Ludwigstein is a living memorial of German youth movement

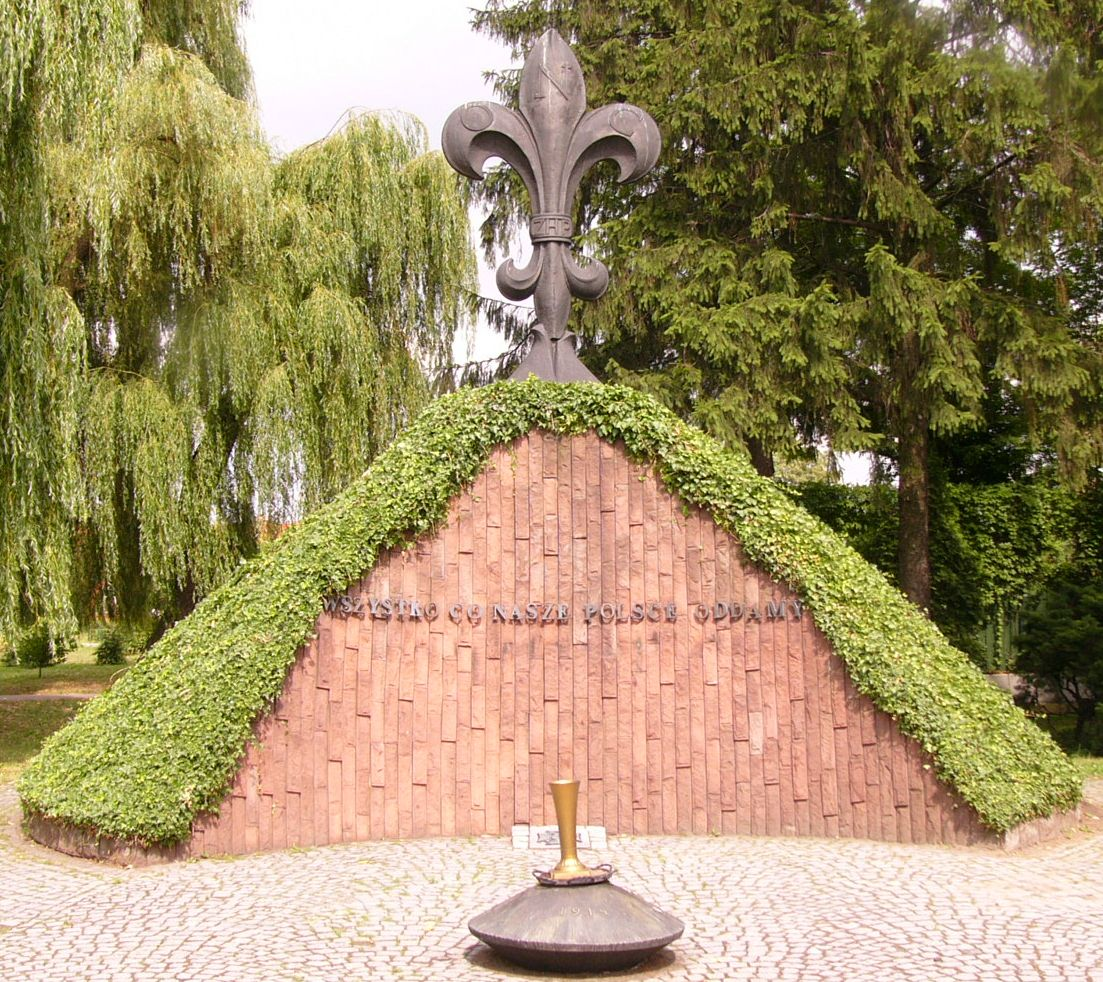
Scout monument in Ostrzeszów

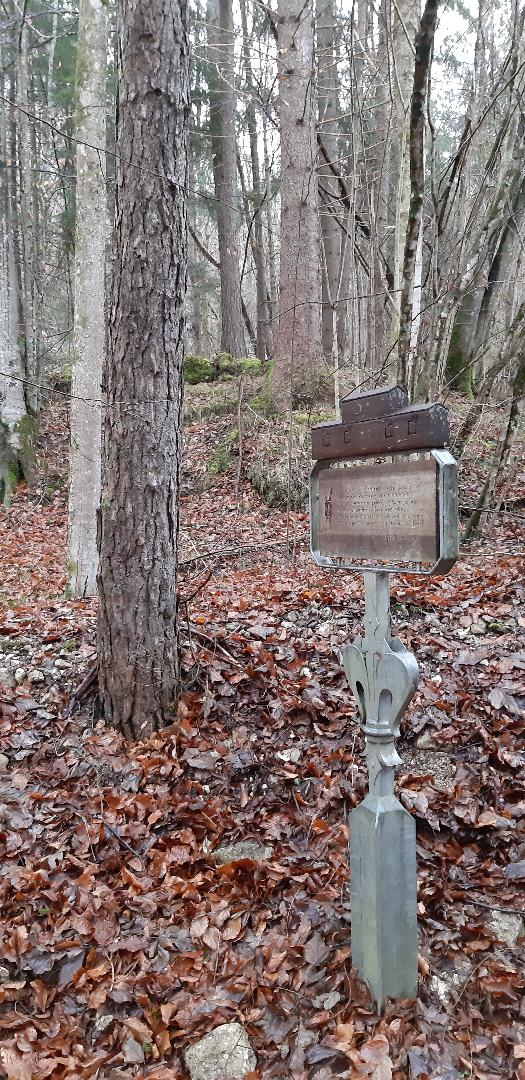
Baumgarten Commemoration Plaque

- Schneizlreuth, Quarter Baumgarten – a commemorative plaque next to the ruins of a Scout house, burned down in 1934 by Hitler Youth and Sturmabteilung
- Mannheim, Hauptfriedhof – gravesite of Maximilian Bayer
- Dommershausen, Quarter Dorweiler, Castle Waldeck (German: Burg Waldeck) – Memorial of the German Youth Movement (German: Ehrenhain der deutschen Jugendbewegung)-memorial stones for German youth leaders (i.e.Eberhard Koebel) and Scoutmasters (i.e. Alexander Lion, Maximilian Bayer)
- Simmern, a memorial for all Scouts killed in action during the World Wars and all Scouts killed by the Nazis.
- Gündelskopf, a mountain in the alps of the Allgäu, Scouts and Guides of the Catholic Scouts of Europe erected a cross on the top of the Gündelskopf to commemorate 100 years of Scouting and to honor the Lord
- Burg Ludwigstein, a castle near Witzenhausen in centre of Germany. The castle is today the main centre of Bündische Jugend and many German and Austrian Scouting and Wandervogel association's. The castel was intended a memorial for members of the Wandervogel that were killed in the First World War and includes today the archive of German Youth Movement.
- Munich, a Commemorative plaque for the first German Scout Group the 1.Münchner Pfadfinderzug in the Oskar-von-Miller-Gymnasium.
- Fischach, Gravesite of Alexander Lion.
- Untergriesbach, Quarter Gottsdorf, Gravesite of Franz Paul Wimmer. Wimmer was one of the first Scoutleaders in Germany. A Commemorative plaque was erected in 2009.
- Frankfurt am Main, a street is named "Boy Scouts Street" (German: Pfadfinderweg).
- Frohnau, Berlin, a street is named "Boy Scouts Street" (German: Pfadfinderweg).
- Hessisch Lichtenau, a street is named Next to the Scout House(German: Am Pfadfinderhaus).
- Wolfsburg, Quarter Kästorf, a street is named "Boy Scouts Street" (German: Pfadfinderweg).
- Pforzheim, Herz-Jesu-Kirche, memorial for the German Catholic Scoutmaster Fred Joseph, who was killed in Auschwitz
- The scout grave („Pfadfindergrab“) is the memorial place provided with a stone cross and inaugurated on 21 June 1931 of an accident in the early morning of 22 June 1930 on the ‘'Liedberg'‘ in Korschenbroich.

  - Sir Robert Baden Powell (ship, 1957)

=== Hungary ===
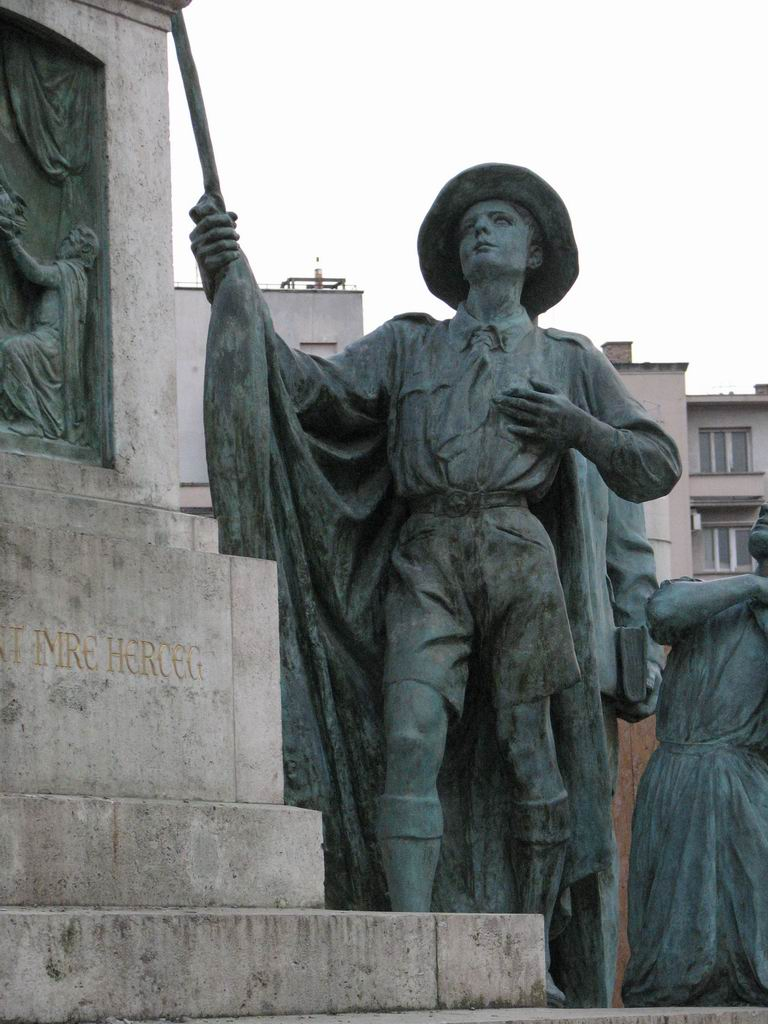
Scout statue, Budapest

- Budapest, Móricz Zsigmond körtér – Statue of a scout on the St. Emeric monument, made by Zsigmond Kisfaludi Strobl, 1930.
- Gödöllő – Statue of a Boy Scout, the memorial of 4th World Scout Jamboree, made by István Paál (1994) after Zsigmond Kisfaludi Strobl.
- Ják – Ancient Roman column, commemorating the event, when 1500 scouts renewed their oath in 1930, celebrating the 10th year of the Szombathely Scout District.

=== Ireland ===
- A plaque sits at the location on Dame Street in Dublin City where Richard Fortune held the first Scout meeting in Ireland at this home.

=== Italy ===
- "Baden-Powell street" (Italian: Via B.Powell), Monfalcone
- Commemorative plaque in Trieste commemorating the See-Skaut-Schule/Scouti marini di Trieste (Sea Scouts School) 1915–1918. It was erected in 2009 by Austrian and Italian Scouts.
- Messina, Sicily on the Via Dina e Clarenza across from the Santuario della Madonna de Montalto. It was dedicated in 2009 to Scouts in Messina.
- Villa comunale "Baden-Powell " (Italian: Villa B.Powell), Alcamo.
- Giardino Robert Baden Powell (Florence).
- Parco Robert Baden Powell (Milan).

=== Luxembourg ===
- Wiltz – The "International Scouting One Penny Monument"

Erected on 28 May 1982, offered by the Scouts of Wiltz with the help of Scouts and Guides of the world, in honour of Lord Robert Baden-Powell 1857–1941 Founder of the Scout Movement. The sculpture of the Roman Travertine is 3.5 meters high with a base approximately 11 tons and was made by the sculptor Lucien Wercollier from Luxembourg. Scouts who visited Wiltz each donated 1 penny. This paid for the monument and so it got its name.

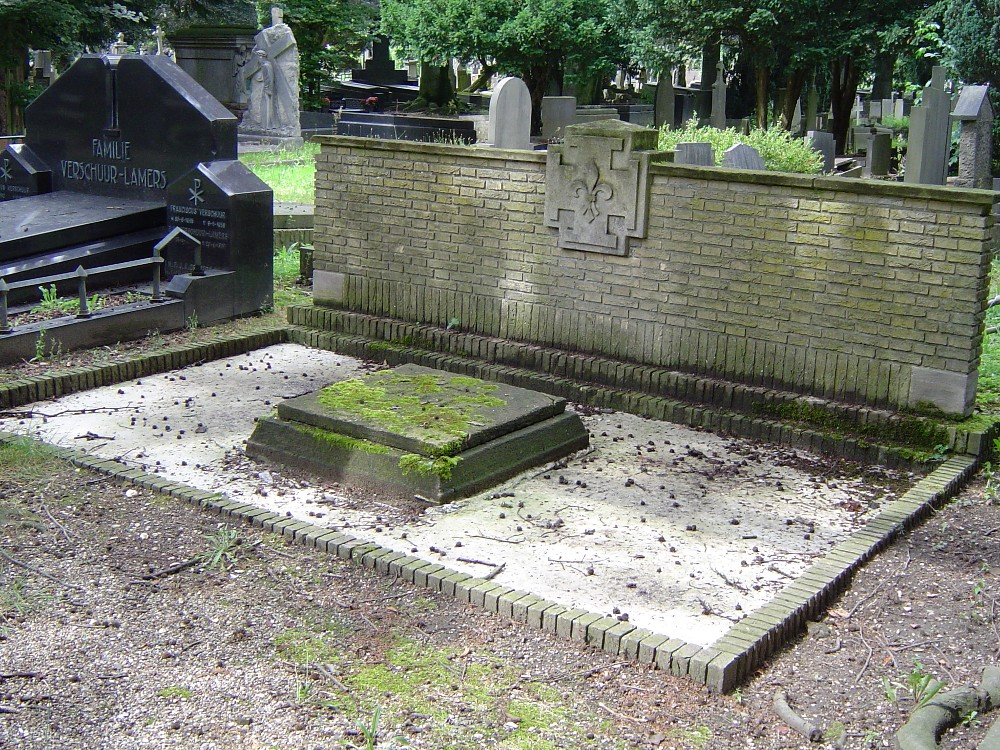
Former grave site Jan van Hoof

=== Netherlands ===
- Nijmegen – Grave site of Jan van Hoof. This brave Rover Scout was killed while helping the allies to liberate Nijmegen during World War II. His grave is adorned with the logo of the Katholieke Verkenners.

=== Poland ===
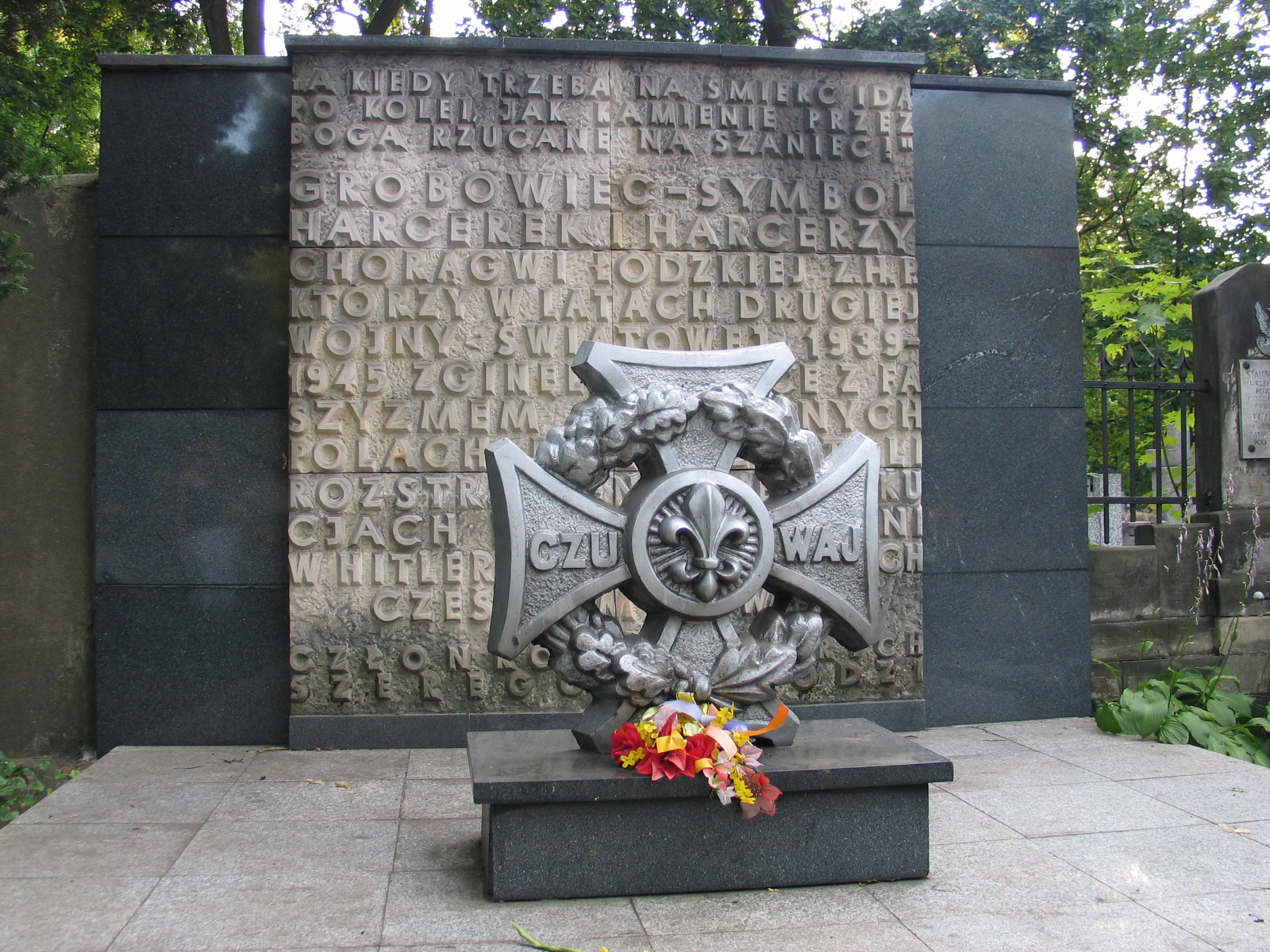
Memorial of ZHP. Łódź

- ZHP Memorial
- Museum of Scouting, Warsaw
- Scouts Memorial, Katowice

=== Portugal ===
- Memorial to Lord Baden Powell in Ferragudo, Lagoa, Algarve.
- Rua Baden-Powell, Albufeira

=== Romania ===
- Scout memorial in Tecuci. It was destroyed in 1950 by communists and re-erected in 1996.

=== Slovenia ===
- "Scout Street" (Slovene: Ulica tabornikov), Maribor
- "Scout Street" (Slovene: Taborniska Ulica), Slovenske Konjice
- "Scout Street" (Slovene: Taborniska Ulica), Slovenska Bistrica
- "Scout Street" (Slovene: Taborniska Ulica), Miklavž na Dravskem polju
- "Scout Street" (Slovene: Taborniska Ulica), Sevnica
- "Scout Path" (Slovene: Taborniska pot), Hrastnik

=== Ukraine ===
- L'viv
  - A cross with Scout lily and a Scout hat in honor of Ukrainian plastuny killed during two World Wars – Lychakivskiy Cemetery
  - A memorial table in honour of Polish Scouts died during WWI – Lychakivskiy Cemetery
  - A memorial table in honour of Ukrainian Scouts who set themselves free from Polish prison – Horodotska Street
  - A memorial table in honour of founders of Polish Scouting (Andrzej and Olga Małkowskis) – Latin Cathedral
  - Plastova street (ukr. вулиця Пластова)
  - A grave of Oleksander Tysovsky, founder of Plast – Lychakivskiy Cemetery
  - A grave of Yuriy Starosol'skyi, Chief Scout of Plast from 1972 to 1991 – Lychakivskiy Cemetery

=== United Kingdom ===
- Seton Birthplace, Wellington Terrace, South Shields, Durham. The birthplace of Ernest Thompson Seton, the founder of the Boy Scouts of America.

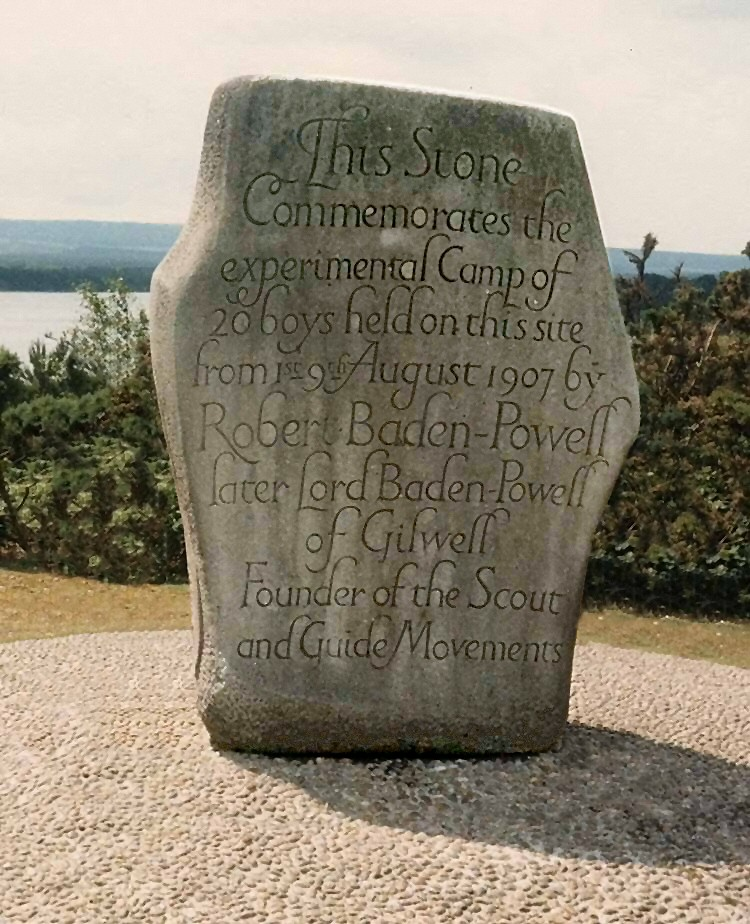
Stone on Brownsea Island commemorating the first scout camp.

- Brownsea Island Scout camp, Dorset. The location of the first scout camp in 1907, complete with a stone memorial (pictured).
- A statue of Robert Baden-Powell is on Poole Quay, Poole, Dorset. The statue looks out towards Brownsea Island. The statue is close to the point from which the boat took him and the first scouts to the first camp on Brownsea Island.
- One World Garden, Hylands Park, Chelmsford, Essex. Built as thanks for the use of Hylands Park during the 21st World Scout Jamboree in 2007.
- Buffalo Statue and Lawn, Gilwell Park, Greater London. Commemorates the Unknown Scout who helped spread Scouting to the United States.
- Bust of Robert Baden-Powell, Gilwell Park, Greater London.
- Media related to The Ideal Scout (Gilwell Park) at Wikimedia Commons
- A plaque on a stone plinth in Paddington Recreation Ground, Maida Vale, Greater London. Commemorating Boy Scouts from the Paddington & St Marylebone District (now part of Westminster Scout District) who died during the Second World War. Annual memorial and wreath laying ceremony held on Remembrance Day (11 November) at 2:30 pm by Westminster District Scouts.
- Baden-Powell House, South Kensington, Greater London. A conference centre with a granite statue of Robert Baden-Powell made by Don Potter.
- Scout Memorial, Nelson, Lancashire. The memorial is of a young boy scout in full uniform and stands on the forecourt area between Nelson Town Centre Library, the Town Hall and the new Liberata Business Centre. It was recently refurbished to a high standard by Pendle Borough Council and is one of a few such statues in the UK which commemorates Scouting losses in the Great War.
- Plaque in grounds of Richmond Castle, North Yorkshire. Commemorating the period from 1908 to 1910 during which Baden-Powell lived in the barracks that formerly stood on site.
- Wooden plaque in the Scout Activity Centre in Warthill, York, North Yorkshire. The plaque commemorates former scouts and scoutmasters who died in the First World War and Second World War. Including Gunner Cecil Molyneaux, a former scoutmaster, who was killed Belgium in 1917.
- Humshaugh Scout Camp Cairn, southwest from Walwick, Northumberland. This marks the site of the first camp of boy scouts, held by Robert Baden-Powell in 1908.
- Carlton Colville Scouts Memorial to six members of a scout troop who drowned in a 1914 boating accident and the sole survivor who died in the 1916 Battle of the Somme.
- The Scout Grave, Edinburgh Newington Cemetery. Laid to rest, interred in a single grave, three Scouts of the 79th Edinburgh Scout Troop who drowned while swimming in the River Tay while camping near Dunkeld, Perthshire on 23 July 1927.
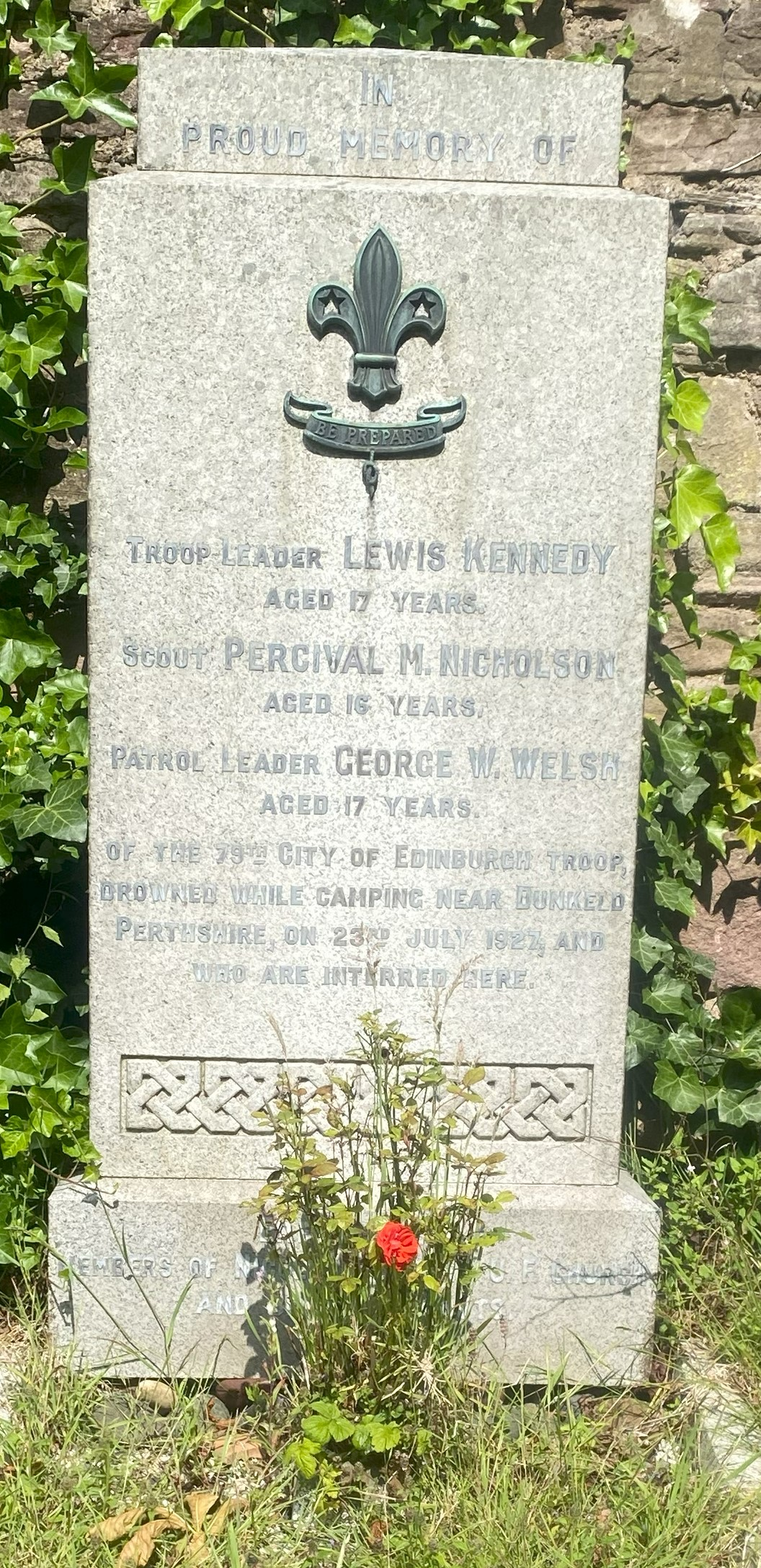
  The Scout Grave, Edinburgh Newington Cemetery

== North America ==
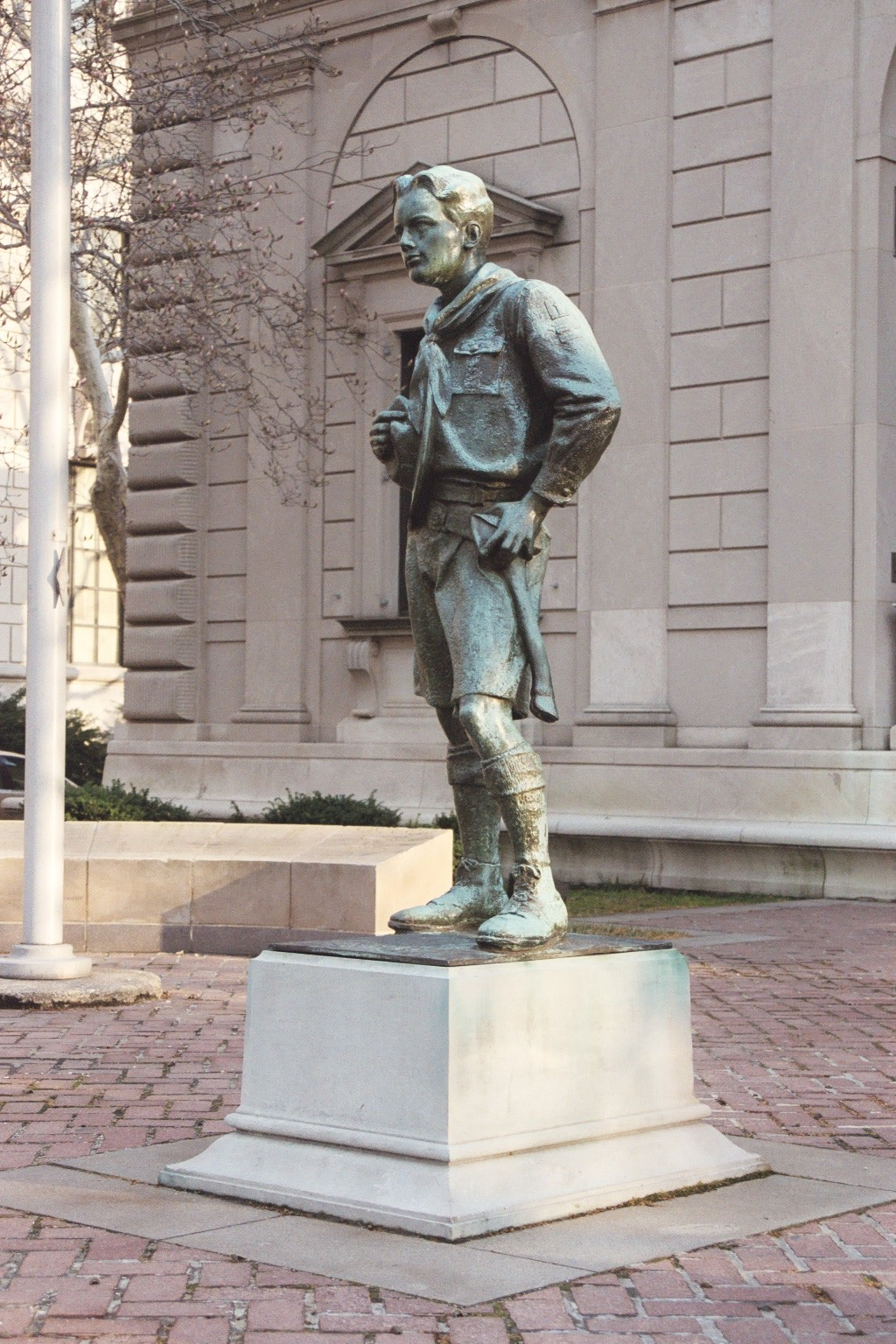
The Ideal Scout by R. Tait McKenzie, 1937

=== Canada ===
- 8th World Scout Jamboree, Niagara-on-the-Lake, Ontario –
- "Szare Szeregi" Monument in Barry's Bay, Canada
- Ernest Thompson Seton Park, Toronto, Ontario
- Historic Plaque, Lindsay, Ontario
- The Seton Centre, Carberry, Manitoba
- Seton Bridge, Manitoba
- Historic Plaque and Seton Woodland Park, on the Trans-Canada Highway (east of Carberry, Manitoba)
- Seton Coulee, near Runnymede, Saskatchewan 51.5°N 101.7°W
- The Ernest Thompson Seton Medal – awarded annually by the Manitoba Naturalists Society
- The Baden-Powell Trail in the District of North Vancouver, British Columbia.

=== Mexico ===
- Scout Statue, Tlalpan Forest, Mexico City (Monumento al Scout, Bosque de Tlalpan, Ciudad de México)

=== United States ===
Scouting

- Boy Scout Memorial by Donald De Lue (1964) in President's Park, 15th Street and Constitution Ave NW, Washington, D.C. 38.8937°N 77.0344°W

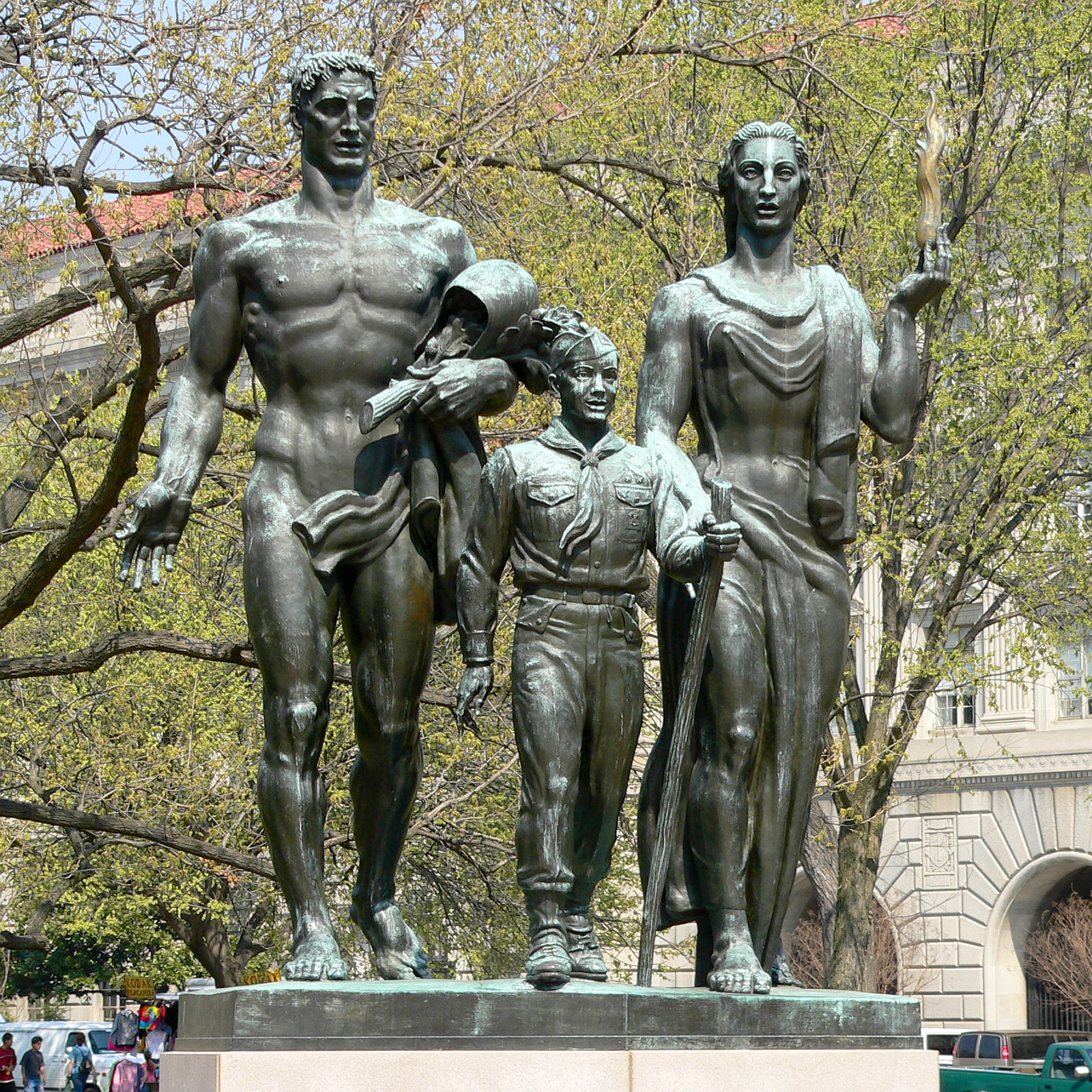
Boy Scout Memorial by Donald De Lue in President's Park, 1964

- The Ideal Scout, a 1937 statue by R. Tait McKenzie outside the Cradle of Liberty Council headquarters in Philadelphia, Pennsylvania.
  - The Ideal Scout (Milwaukee) and The Scout (Portland, Oregon)
- Scouts Memorial, Whitman, Massachusetts
- Jamboree Road in Newport Beach, California, Site of the 1953 Jamboree
- Eagle Scout Memorial Fountain, Kansas City, Missouri
- Scout Key in Florida
- Boy Scout Tree Trail in the Jedediah Smith Redwoods State Park
- Scouters' Mountain in Happy Valley, Oregon

Founders

- Robert Baden-Powell
  - Mount Baden-Powell 34.3586°N 117.7645°W
  - Baden-Powell Elementary School, Anaheim, California
- Daniel Carter Beard
  - Daniel Carter Beard Bridge 39.1006°N 84.4945°W
  - Beard Statue in Covington, Kentucky, Kentucky Historical Marker 39.0888°N 84.5066°W
  - The Daniel Carter Beard Boyhood Home is a National Historic Landmark.
  - Daniel Carter Beard Memorial Square, New York City 40.7638°N 73.8283°W
  - Daniel Carter Beard School, New York City40.7638°N 73.8283°W
  - Beard gravesite, Brick Church Cemetery aka Reformed Church Cemetery, New Hempstead, New York, 41.1392°N 74.0647°W
  - Mount Beard, a peak near Mount McKinley in Alaska.
- William D. Boyce
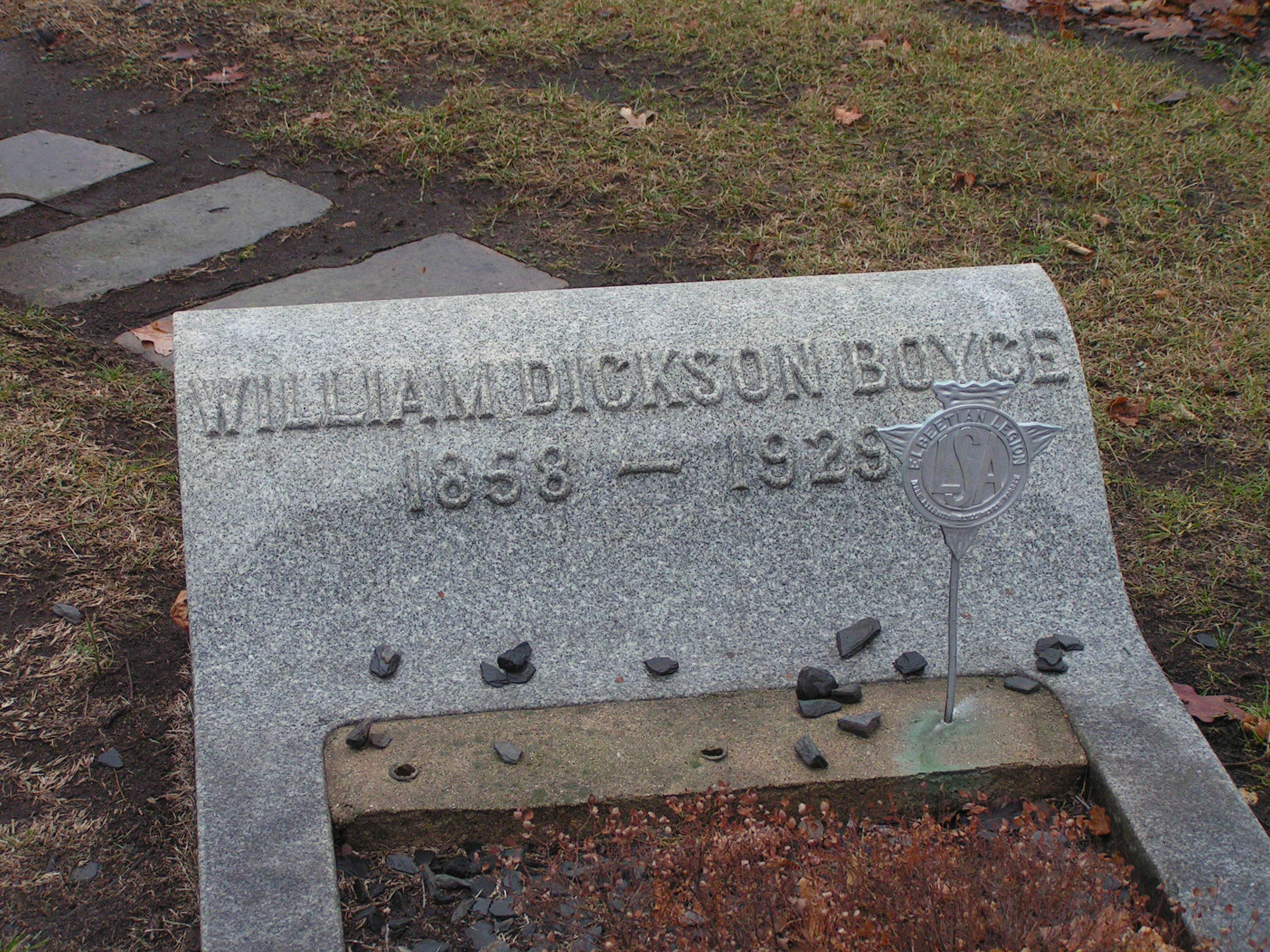
  William D. Boyce gravesite
  - Boyce gravesite, Ottawa Avenue Cemetery, Ottawa, Illinois 41.3369°N 88.8664°W

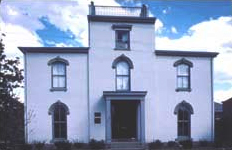
Daniel C. Beard Boyhood Home

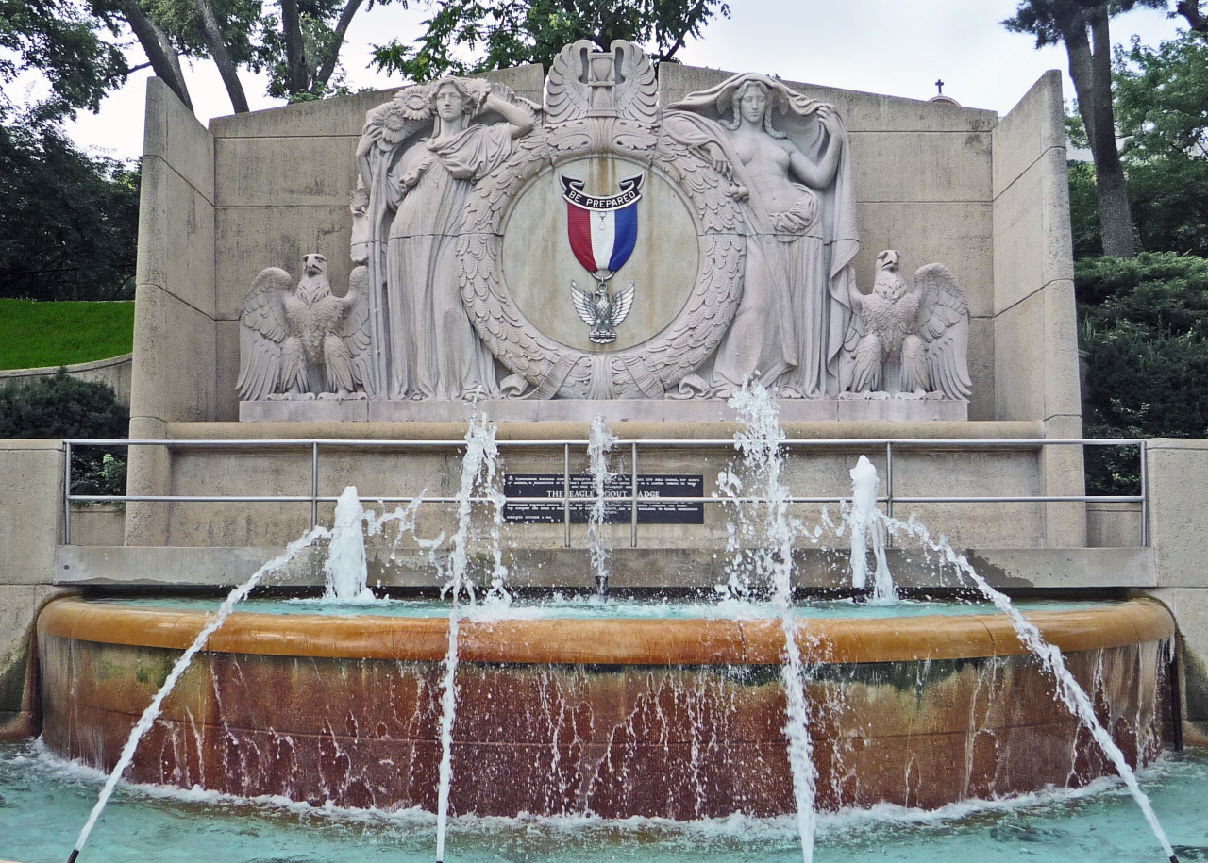
Eagle Scout Memorial Fountain, E. 39th Street at Gillham Road, Kansas City

- Frederick Russell Burnham
  - Mount Burnham 34.22°N 117.47°W
  - Burnham gravesite, Three Rivers Cemetery, Three Rivers, California 36.2715°N 118.5311°W
  - Burnham-Arizona Boy Scouts dedication monument, Cabeza Prieta National Wildlife Refuge, Arizona. This monument was created for the dedicated of the refuge on 23 March 1941. Major Burnham and the Arizona boy scouts attended the dedication ceremony; Burnham gave the dedication speech.
  - Burnham Street, Seaside, Bridgeport, Connecticut
- William "Green Bar Bill" Hillcourt
  - Hillcourt grave – buried in St. Joseph's Catholic Church Cemetery (Row 8, Block I) in Mendham, New Jersey (near Schiff Scout Reservation). 40.7755°N 74.6024°W
- Ernest Thompson Seton
  - Seton Memorial Library and Museum
  - Seton Village, New Mexico. Registered National Historic Landmark and a New Mexico State Cultural Property 35.5989°N 105.9331°W
  - The Ernest Thompson Seton Award – Campfire Girls of America
- James E. West
  - West gravesite – [Section 187, Lot 14037] (Computer Number 15669), Kensico Cemetery, Valhalla, New York

Others

- Four Chaplains memorial
- The Memorial Mall at Camp Tuckahoe - Dedicated to members of the "Council Eternal" (a Scout or Scouter who has died). 40.0981°N 77.0954°W
  - Chapel at the top of the mall was dedicated in memory of Rabbi Goode, one of the Four Chaplains.

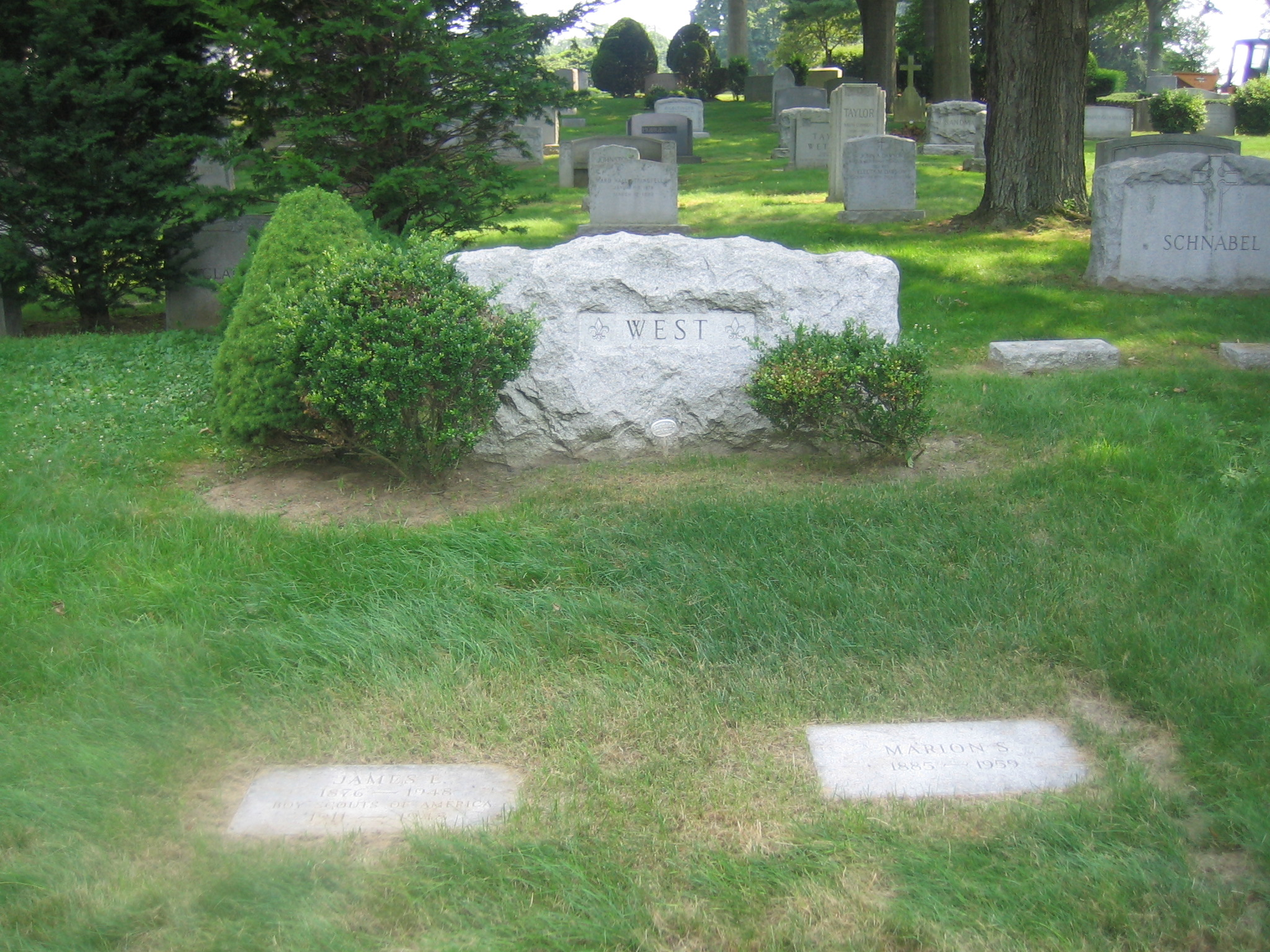
James E. West grave

== Oceania ==
=== Australia ===
- At Gilwell Park, Gembrook, Victoria the De Molnar Memorial Hall was opened 26 January 1964.

The building commemorates the former International Commissioner and Deputy Camp Chief of Hungary and Chairman of Melbourne Scout District Fritz de Molnar.

- Lord Baden Powell Drive, Wagga Wagga

== Central and South America ==
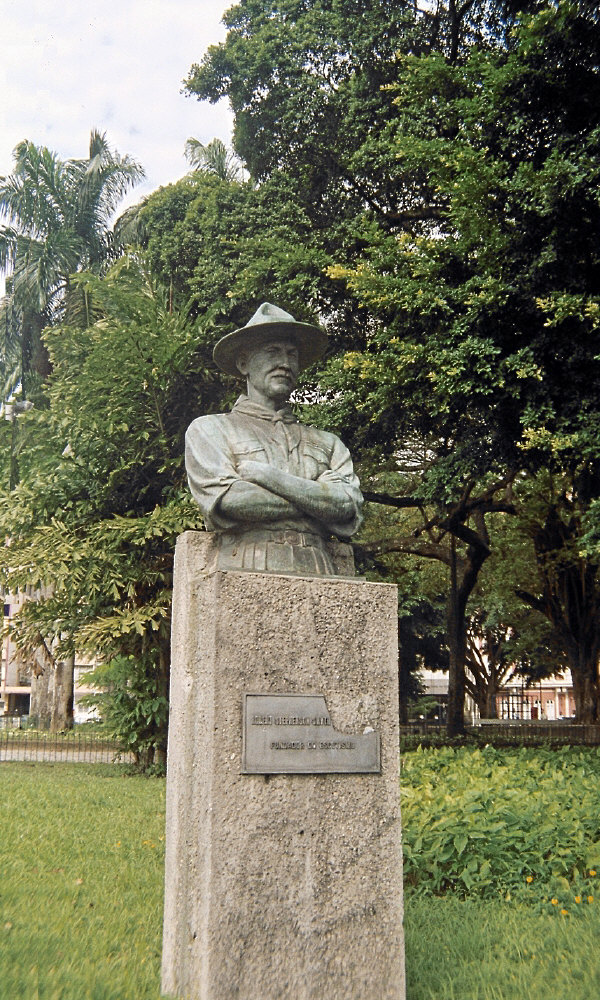
Baden-Powell statue in Rio de Janeiro.

=== Brazil ===
- A statue honoring Baden-Powell, inscribed "Founder of Scouting", is located in a park in the Gloria section of central Rio de Janeiro.
- A statue on the Praia do Flamengo in Rio de Janeiro was given to the youth of Brazil by the youth of Chile for their aid in the 1923 earthquake. A stamp honoring the statue was issued in 1954.

=== El Salvador ===
- A monument (with bust) to Baden-Powell is located in San Salvador, El Salvador.

=== Venezuela ===
- A full torso statue is located in Bello Campo, Municipio Chacao, Estado Miranda, Caracas, Venezuela.

== Film tributes ==
- Ernest Thompson Seton, Keeper of the Wild (1974) Canadian Broadcasting Corporation
- Seton's Manitoba (1984) Canadian Broadcasting Corporation

== Baden-Powell Centenary ==
In 1957, Scouts and Scouters world-wide celebrated the centennial anniversary of Baden-Powell's birth.

== See also ==
- Scout hall
- Scouting museums
- Scouting memorabilia collecting
