= Jan van Hoof =

Member of World War 2 Dutch resistance

- Born: Jan Jozef Lambert van Hoof; 7 August 1922; Nijmegen, Netherlands
- Died: 19 September 1944 (aged 22); Nijmegen, Reichskommissariat Niederlande
- Cause of death: Execution by shooting
- Resting place: Algemene begraafplaats Vredehof, Nijmegen
- Education: Catholic University of Nijmegen
- Occupation: Student
- Known for: Operation Market Garden

Jan Jozef Lambert van Hoof (7 August 1922 – 19 September 1944) was a member of the Dutch resistance in World War II, who aided the Allies during Operation Market Garden. He is credited with disabling explosives placed by the Germans to destroy a vital bridge to delay the Allies, and was later executed in action. Before and during the war, Van Hoof was a Rover Scout, and the Scouting medal the Nationale Padvindersraad was named in his honour.

== Biography ==
Logo of the Katholieke Verkenners

Before the war he was a Boy Scout with the Katholieke Verkenners (Catholic Scouts). During World War II, Scouting was forbidden in most occupied countries. All the Scouting organizations were to be integrated into the Nationale Jeugdstorm (NJS), the Dutch version of the Hitler Youth. However, the Dutch Scouting organisations did not accept the terms of the NJS and went underground, with some joining the resistance.

Jan van Hoof joined the resistance. Shortly after the occupation of the Netherlands by the Nazis, he became a member of a Rover crew and in the spring of 1943 was secretly installed as full Rover Scout. During the occupation, he made observations and drawings of key locations, especially the Waal Bridges. With the arrival of Allied troops during Operation Market Garden in September 1944, he used his local knowledge to guide them during the Battle of Nijmegen.

It was said that he disarmed the explosives attached to the Waal Bridge during the fighting, though there were no witnesses. After this, he went home and told his sister 'the bridge is saved'; he then returned to the American unit and resumed guiding them through the city. Enquiries after the war could not positively identify Van Hoof as the individual who cut the wires to the bridge; however circumstantial evidence supports the claim, and when the Germans eventually tried to blow the bridge, just before its capture, they failed.

The Dutch resistance members wore distinguishing armbands so they could be recognised as soldiers. The Germans, however, saw this as a provocation and did not recognize them as combatants.

On 19 September, van Hoof was riding on the top of a British Guards Armoured Division Humber scout car, guiding the vehicle from the central post office to Allied soldiers attacking the railway bridge, when a German 2-cm gun opened fire, setting the vehicle alight. When the German troops arrived, the British crew were already dead, but van Hoof was still alive. They took his gun, identity papers and his armband which identified him as an official Allied soldier. He was beaten and then shot through the head.

== Decorations ==
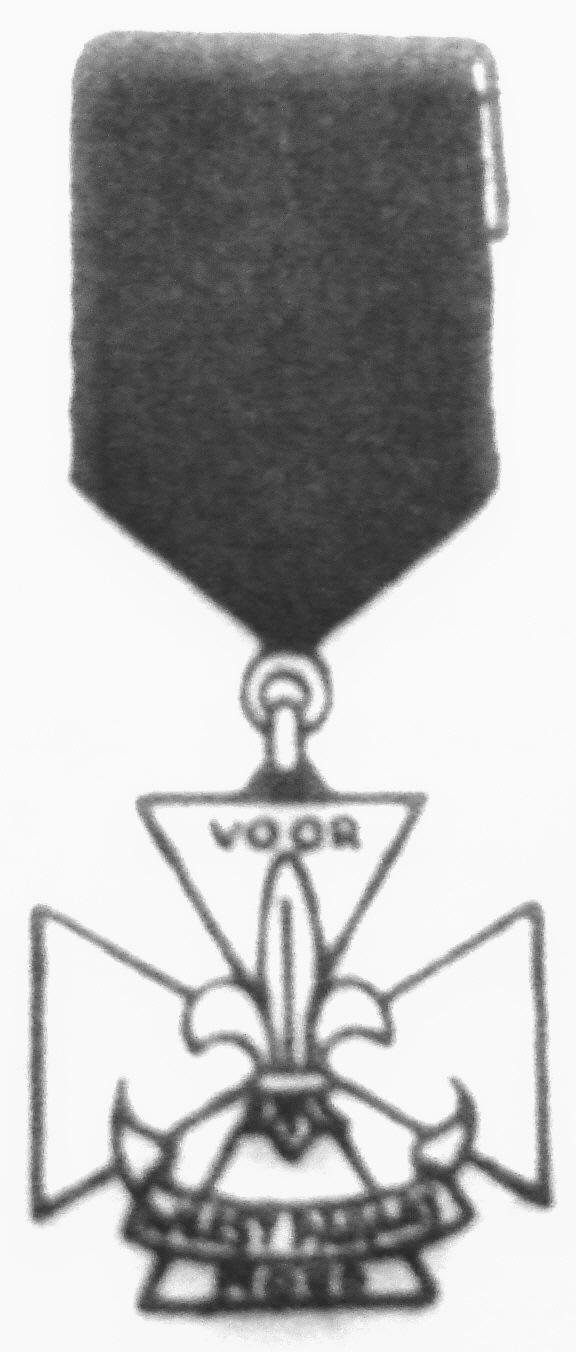
Jan van Hoof Cross medal

Van Hoof was posthumously awarded:

- 1945: Medal of Freedom with bronze Palm (USA),
- 1946: Order of William Knight 4th Class (Netherlands),
- 1947: The King's Commendation for Brave Conduct with silver laurel (UK),

After the war, the Honor Medal for bravery of the Nationale Padvindersraad, the Dutch Boy Scouts umbrella organisation before 1973, was renamed to Jan van Hoof-kruis in his remembrance.

== Monuments dedicated to Jan van Hoof ==
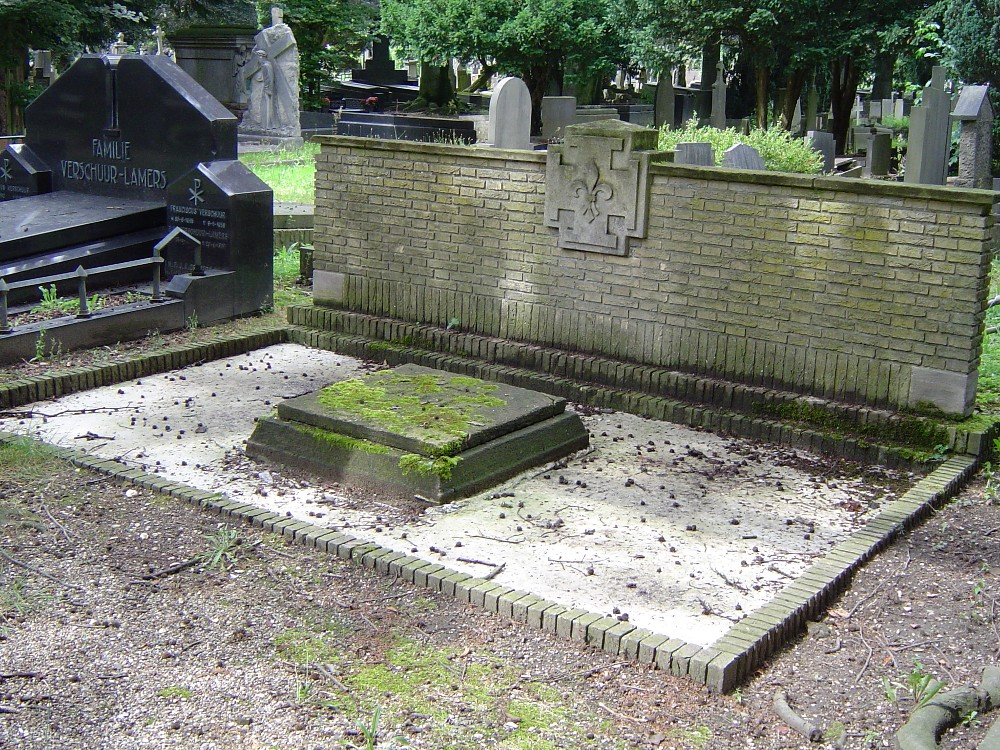
Former grave Jan van Hoof at the Roman Catholic burial site on the Daalseweg, Nijmegen

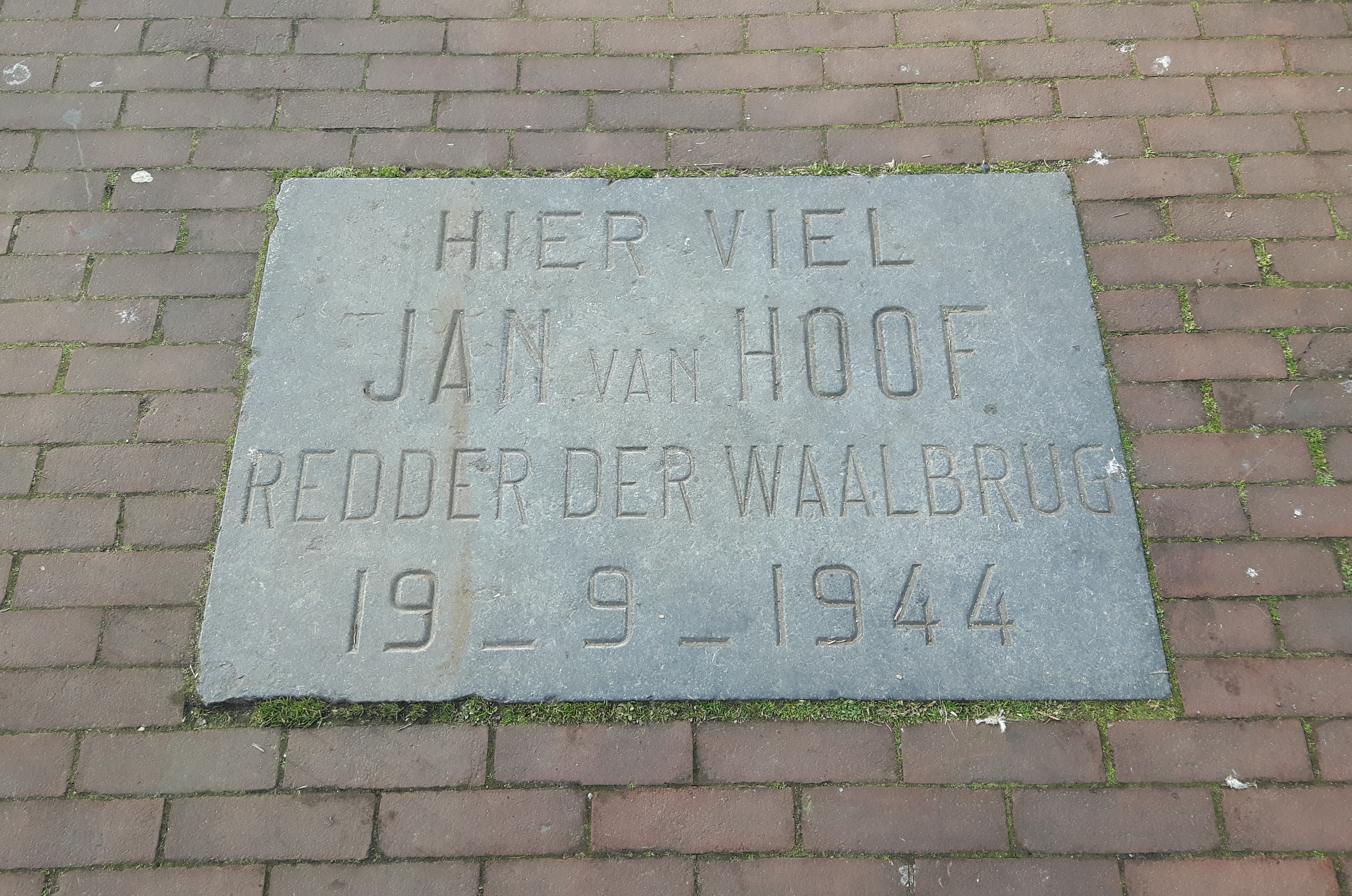
"Here Fell Jan Van Hoof, Savior of the Waal Bridge" Memorial monument at the Joris Ivensplein, Nijmegen

These monuments and graves are dedicated to Jan van Hoof.

- Nijmegen, Jan van Hoofmonument
- Nijmegen, 'honour grave' of Jan van Hoof
- Nijmegen, monument on the Waal Bridge
- Nijmegen, monument at the Joris Ivensplein
- Nijmegen, Dutch War Cemetery

== See also ==
- 5th World Scout Jamboree
- Scouting memorials
