= The Scout (Portland, Oregon) =

Statue by R. Tait McKenzie in Portland, Oregon

- The Ideal Scout
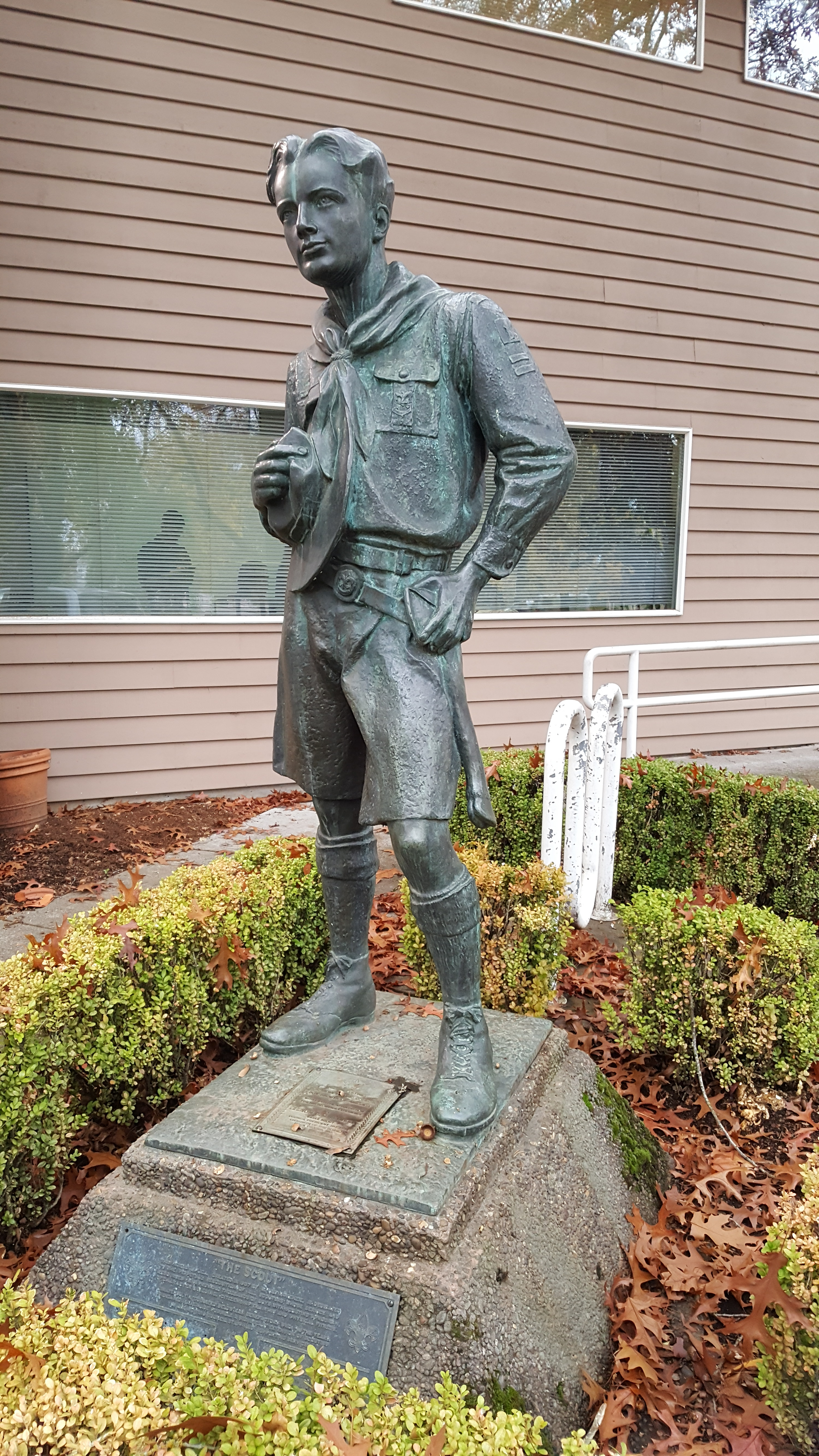
- The sculpture in 2017
- Artist: R. Tait McKenzie
- Medium: Metal sculpture
- Dimensions: 1.8 m × 0.66 m × 0.48 m (70 in × 26 in × 19 in)
- Location: Portland, Oregon
- 45.507272°N 122.678059°W
- Owner: Boy Scouts of America, Cascade Pacific Council

The Scout is a copy of sculptor R. Tait McKenzie's The Ideal Scout, installed outside the offices of Boy Scouts of America's Cascade Pacific Council, at 2145 Southwest Naito Parkway, in Portland, Oregon.

== Description ==
According to the Smithsonian Institution, the statue is a "Full-length figure of an adolescent boy in the traditional Boy Scout uniform of shirt, scarf, shorts, knee socks and laced ankle-high shoes. He holds a hat over his chest with his proper right hand." The metal statue measures appropriately 70 x 26 x 19 inches, and rests on a trapezoid-shaped base with a width of approximately 52 inches and a diameter of approximately 55 inches.

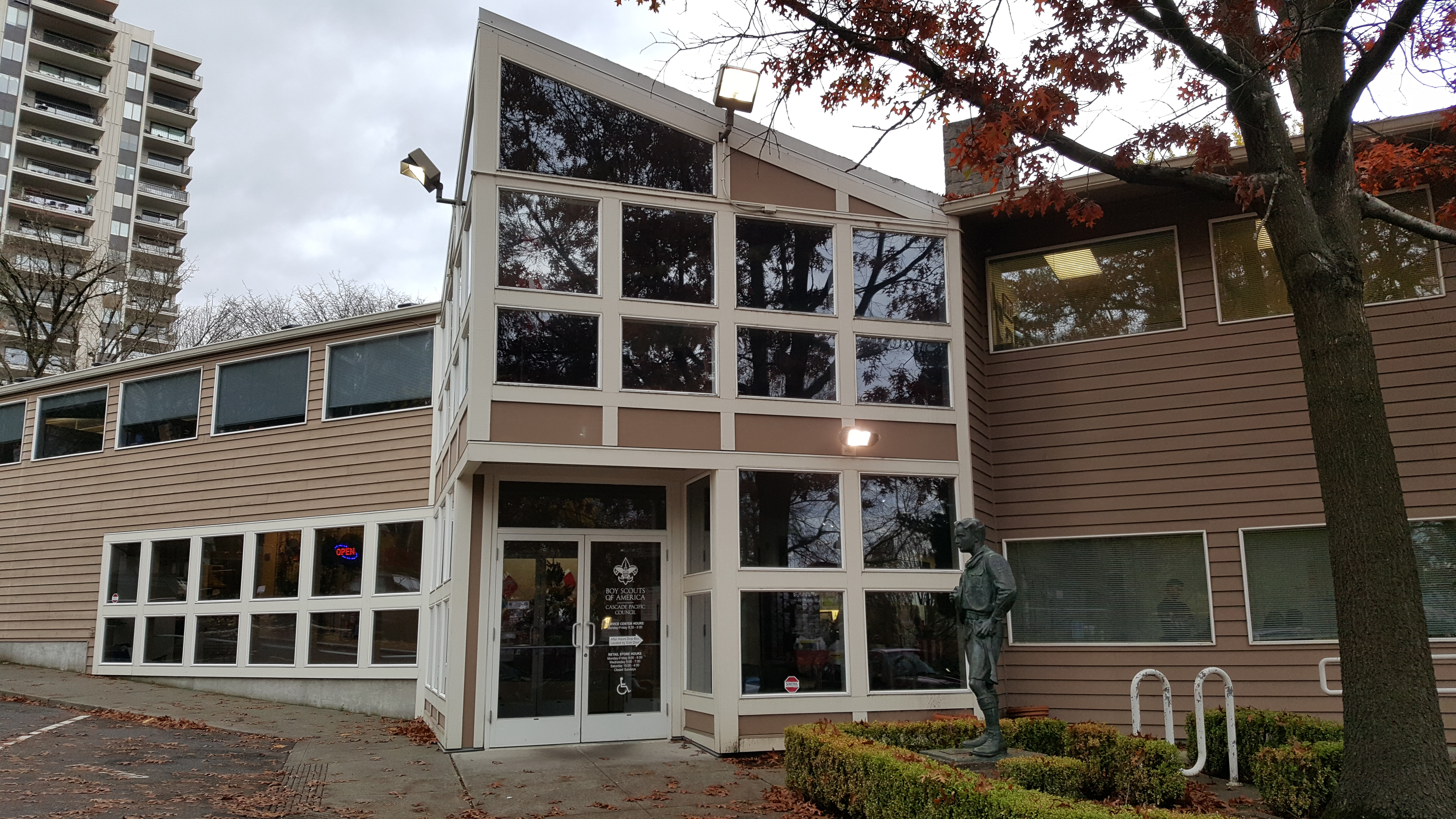
The statue in front of Cascade Pacific Council's offices, 2017

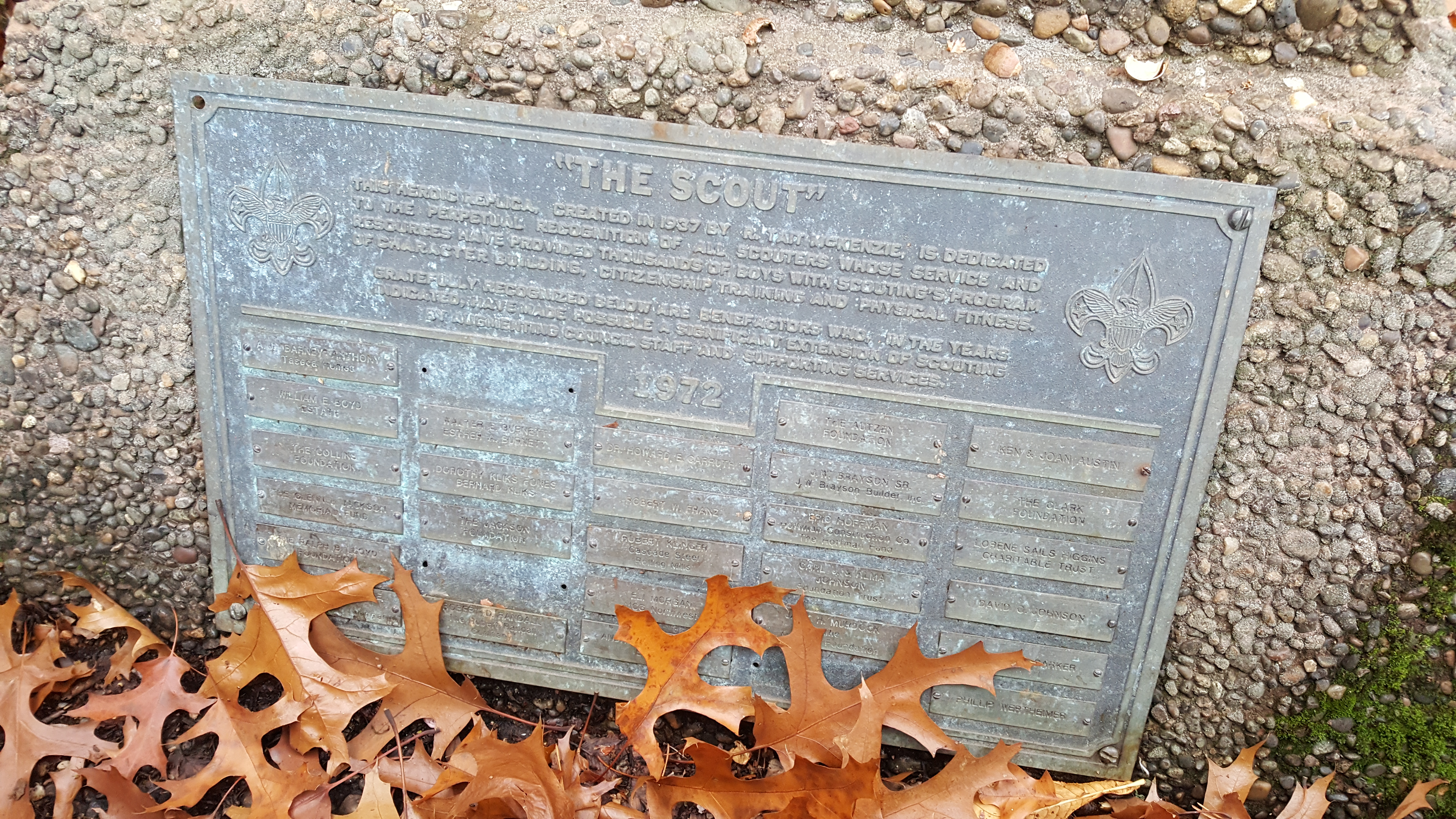
Plaque for the sculpture

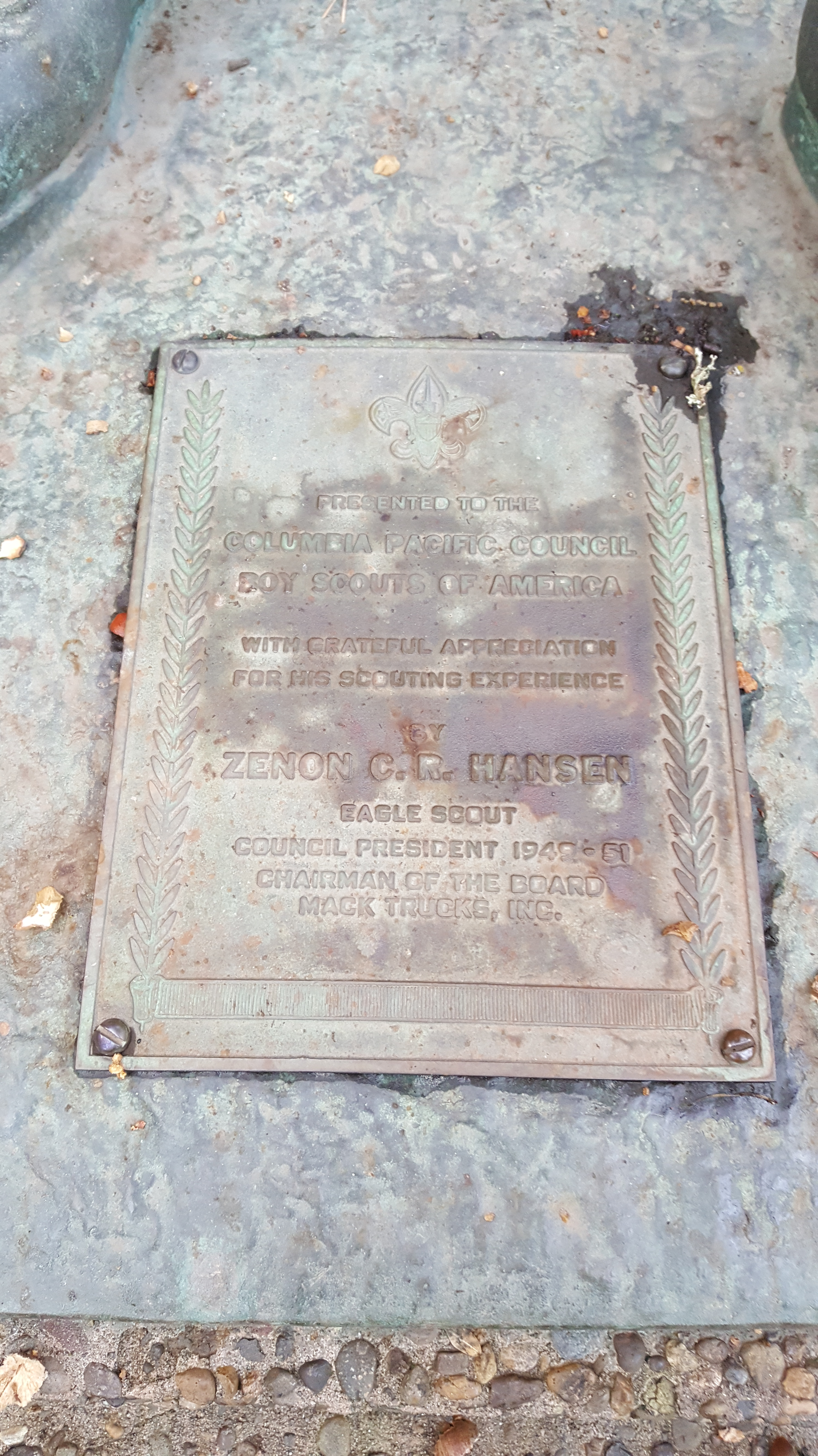
Plaque for the sculpture

== History ==
The Portland cast was gifted by the council's former president, Zenon C.R. Hansen, and dedicated in 1972. It was surveyed as part of Smithsonian's "Save Outdoor Sculpture!" program in 1993.

== See also ==
- 1972 in art
- List of Scouting memorials
- Scouting in Oregon
