= The Ideal Scout =

Sculpture by R. Tait McKenzie

Coordinates: 39.95910°N 75.17525°W

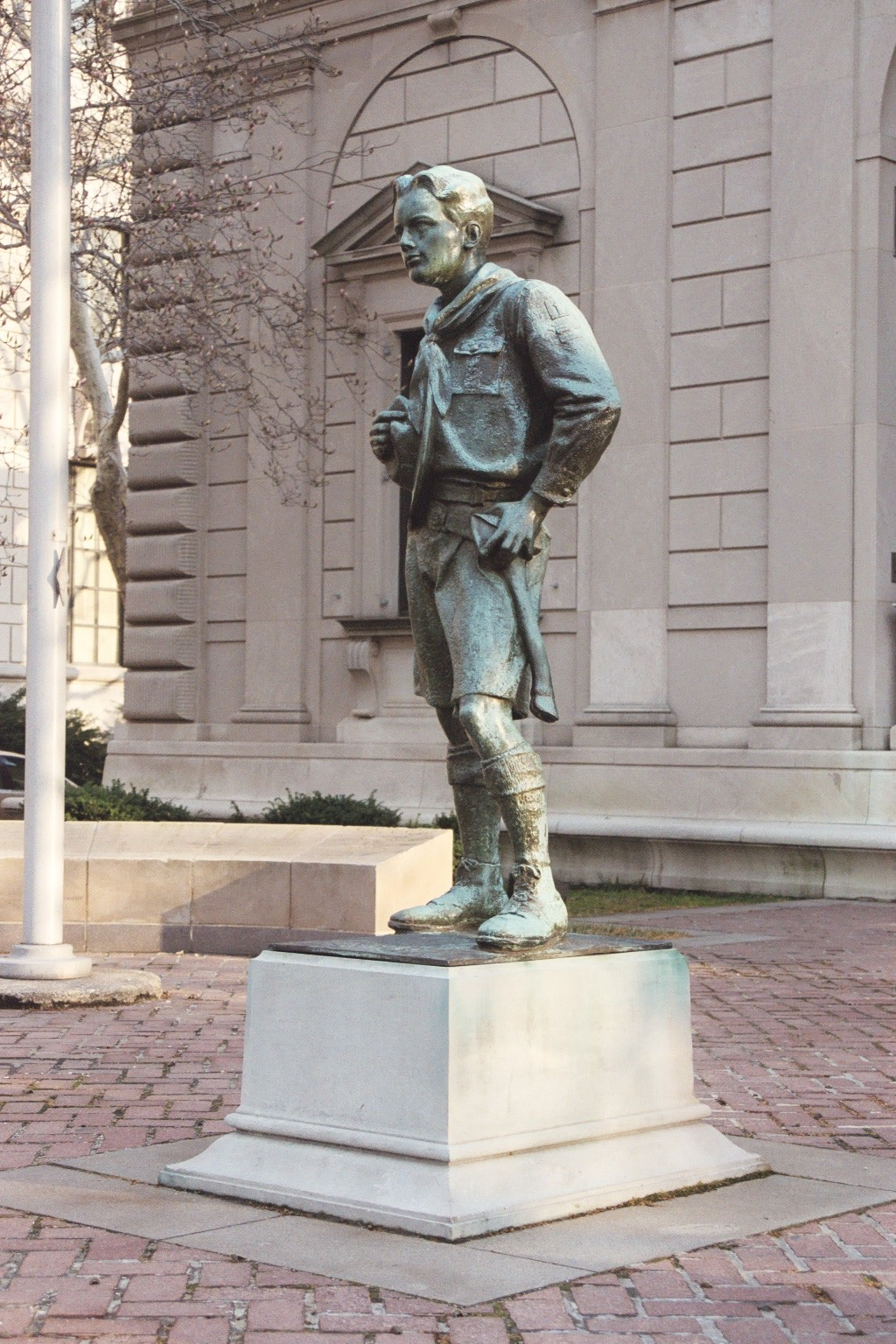
The original statue in Philadelphia

The Ideal Scout, also known as The Boy Scout, is a work by Canadian sculptor R. Tait McKenzie (1867–1938). The original statue stood in front of the Cradle of Liberty Council at 22nd and Winter Streets in Philadelphia, Pennsylvania, from 1937 to 2013. Replicas can be found at Scouting America councils across the United States, as well as at Gilwell Park in London, England, and at Scouts Canada's national office in Ottawa. The Smithsonian American Art Museum's database lists 18 copies.

== History ==
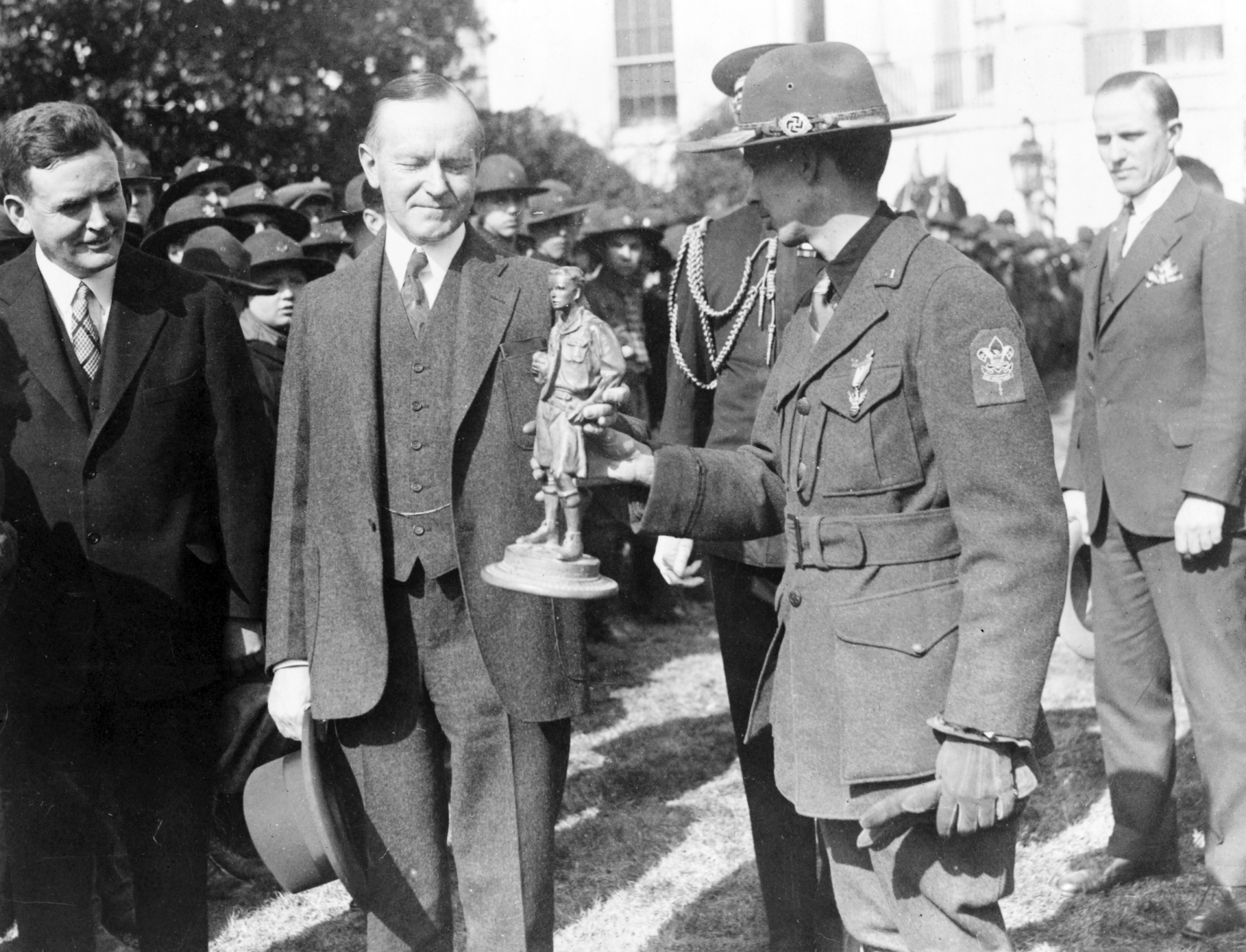
President Calvin Coolidge receiving a copy of the statuette, outside the White House, 1927.

McKenzie sat on the executive board of the Boy Scouts organization in Philadelphia for more than 20 years. Asked to produce a figure of "an ideal scout," the sculptor chose several young scouts to model in uniform. In 1915, he gave the executive board an 18-inch bronze figure, together with rights to the royalties resulting from sales of copies. He said that the boy's uncovered head denoted reverence, obedience to authority, and discipline. The hatchet held by the scout is a symbol of truthfulness and the hope it would never be unsheathed for wanton destruction, but "applied unceasingly to the neck of treachery, treason, cowardice, discourtesy, dishonesty, and dirt."

McKenzie's life-sized version of the work was unveiled at the Philadelphia Council's office at 22nd and Winter Streets on June 12, 1937. The Ideal Scout was removed in 2013 after the successor Cradle of Liberty Council vacated the building.

A replica in Ottawa, Illinois, adorns the grave of William D. Boyce (1858–1929), founder of the Boy Scouts of America, who modeled the organization on Great Britain's Boy Scouts Association.

== Partial list of locations ==
=== Statuette ===
- Brookings Library Brookings, South Dakota
- Philadelphia Museum of Art (1915) 18-inch statuette - accession number 42-7-1
- St. Louis, Missouri
- University of Pennsylvania, Philadelphia
- University of Tennessee, Knoxville

=== Statue ===
- Allentown, Pennsylvania (1975)
- Ann Arbor, Michigan (1980)
- Atlanta, Georgia (Atlanta Area Council Volunteer Service Center)
- Baltimore, Maryland, (1937)
- Cimarron, New Mexico (National Museum of Scouting, Philmont Scout Ranch)
- Cleveland, Ohio (1962)
- Davie, Florida - South Florida Council, Tatham Scout Service Center (2023)
- Delray Beach, Florida
- Denver, Colorado - Hamilton Scout Headquarters
- Detroit, Michigan (1965)
- East Stroudsburg, Pennsylvania (1972)
- Elbert Colorado - McNeil Scout Ranch at Peaceful Valley (1973)
- Ely, Minnesota - Northern Tier Charles L. Sommers Canoe Base
- Farmington, Pennsylvania (1991)
- Fort Snelling, Minnesota
- Fort Worth, Texas (1956)
- Goshen, Virginia - Goshen Scout Reservation
- Greenburg, Pennsylvania (1982)
- Houlton, Wisconsin - Fred C. Andersen Scout Camp
- Hudson, Wisconsin - Lakefront Park (2009)
- Indianapolis, Indiana (1990)
- Irving, Texas (1979)
- Jackson, Mississippi (1937)
- Kalamazoo (Texas Township), Michigan (2015)
- Kansas City, Missouri (Heart of America Council Service Center) (1937)
- Kenai, Alaska - Eric Hansen Park (1997)
- Lakeland, Florida (Publix Corporate Office)
- Lancaster, Pennsylvania (1995)
- Ligonier, Pennsylvania (1937)
- Mansfield, Ohio (Heart of Ohio Council Service Center)
- Mechanicsburg, Pennsylvania (1978)
- Milwaukee, Wisconsin (1985)
- Mobile, Alabama (Mobile Area Council)
- Morganville (Marlboro Township), New Jersey
- Naperville, Illinois
- Nashville, Tennessee (Middle Tennessee Council) (2002)
- Ogden, Utah
- Ottawa, Illinois (1941) - grave of William D. Boyce, founder of the Boy Scouts of America
- Philadelphia, Pennsylvania, Cradle of Liberty Council (1937)
- Pittsburgh, Pennsylvania (1937)
- Portland, Oregon (1972)
- Raleigh, North Carolina
- Reedesville, Pennsylvania (1992)
- Sharpsburg, Pennsylvania (1937)
- Sioux Falls, South Dakota
- St. Paul, Minnesota (1965)
- Tulsa, Oklahoma (2003)
- University of Pennsylvania (1937)
- Vernon Hills, Illinois (2018)
- Westlake, Texas, Scouting U, Westlake Campus (Center for Professional Development)

== Gallery ==
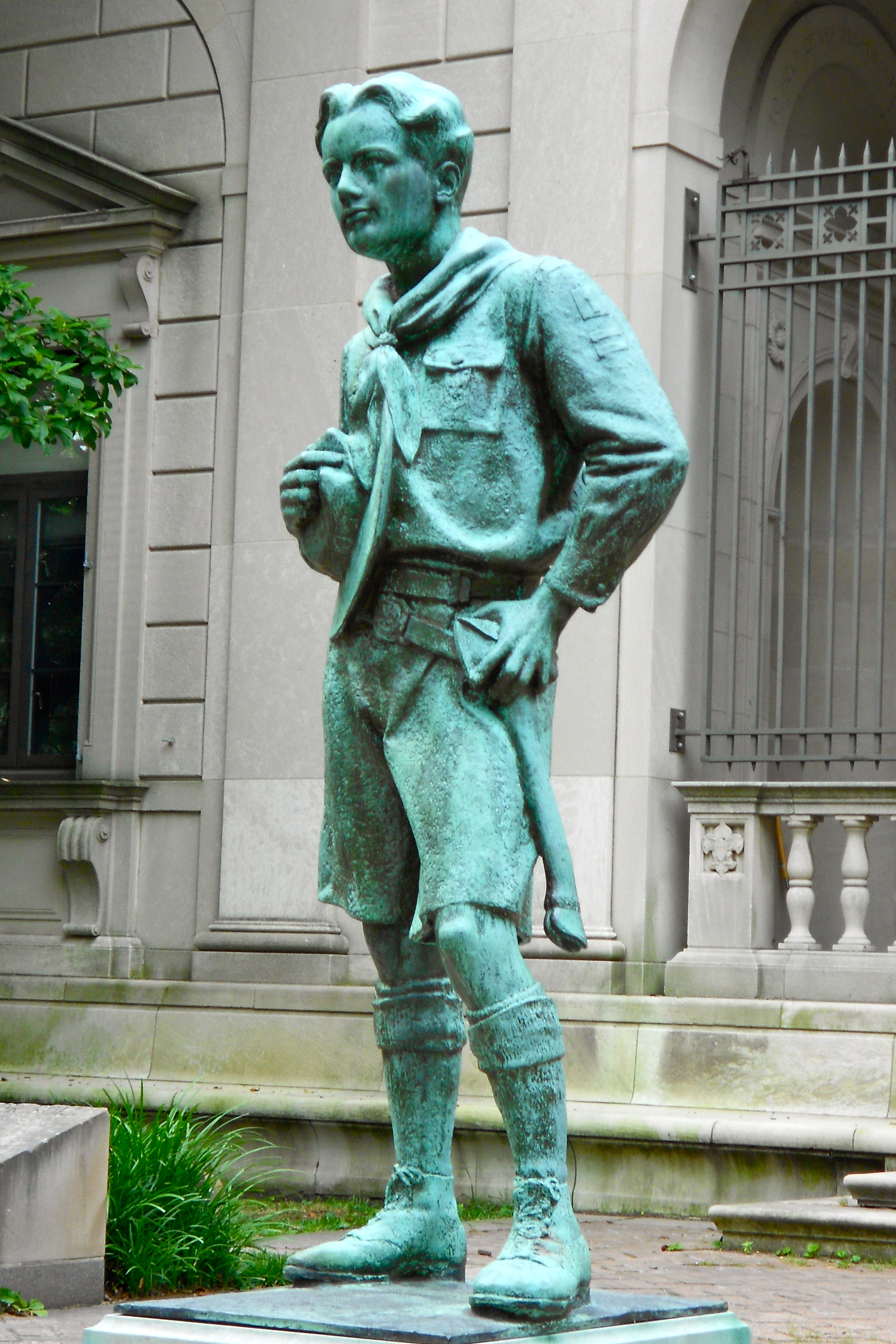
Philadelphia

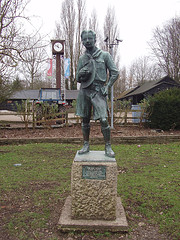
The Ideal Scout, donated to Gilwell Park, London, England, in 1966 by the Boy Scouts of America

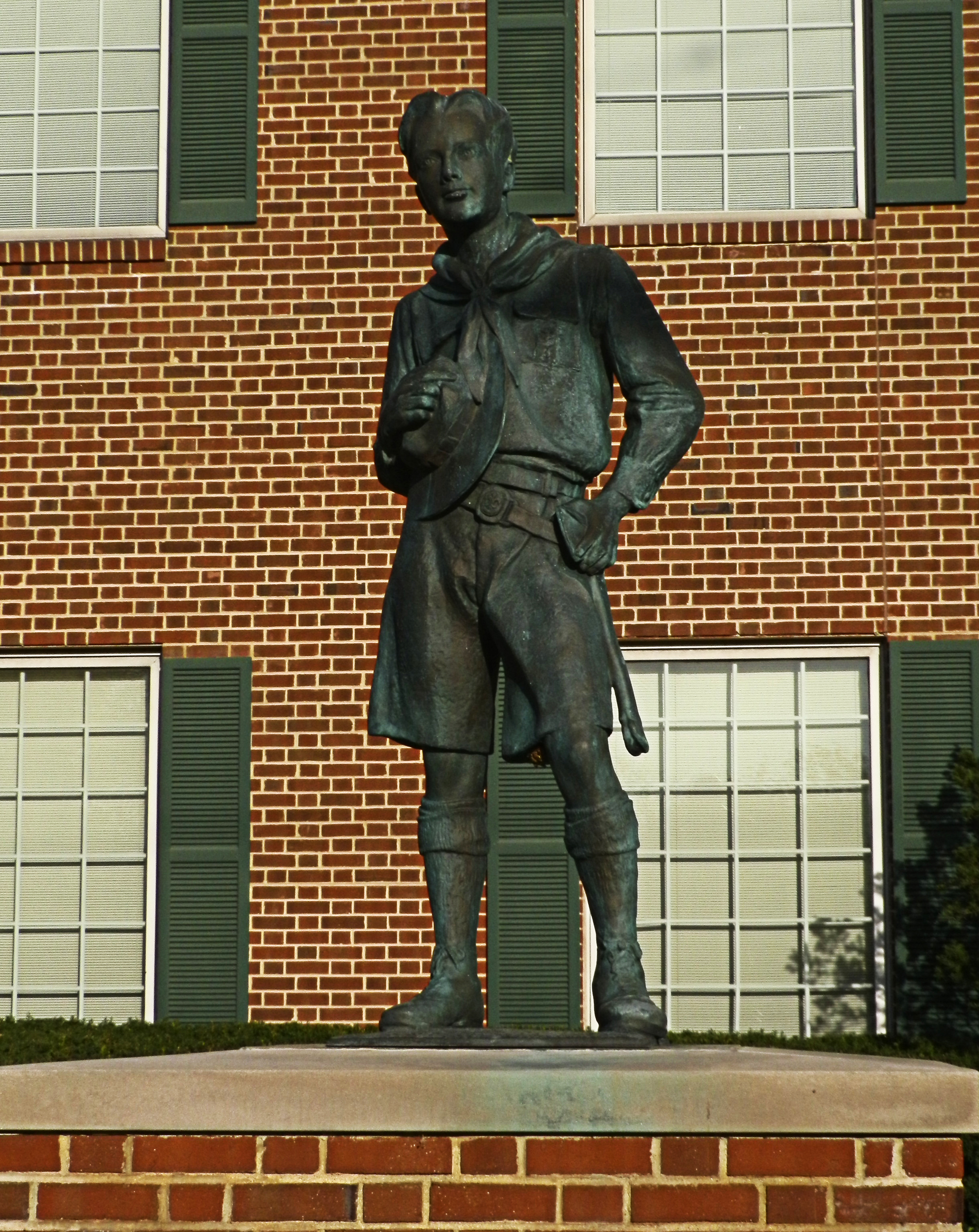
Milwaukee

== See also ==
- List of Scouting memorials
- Cradle of Liberty Council v. City of Philadelphia
