= Museum of Scouting, Warsaw =

Museum of Scouting

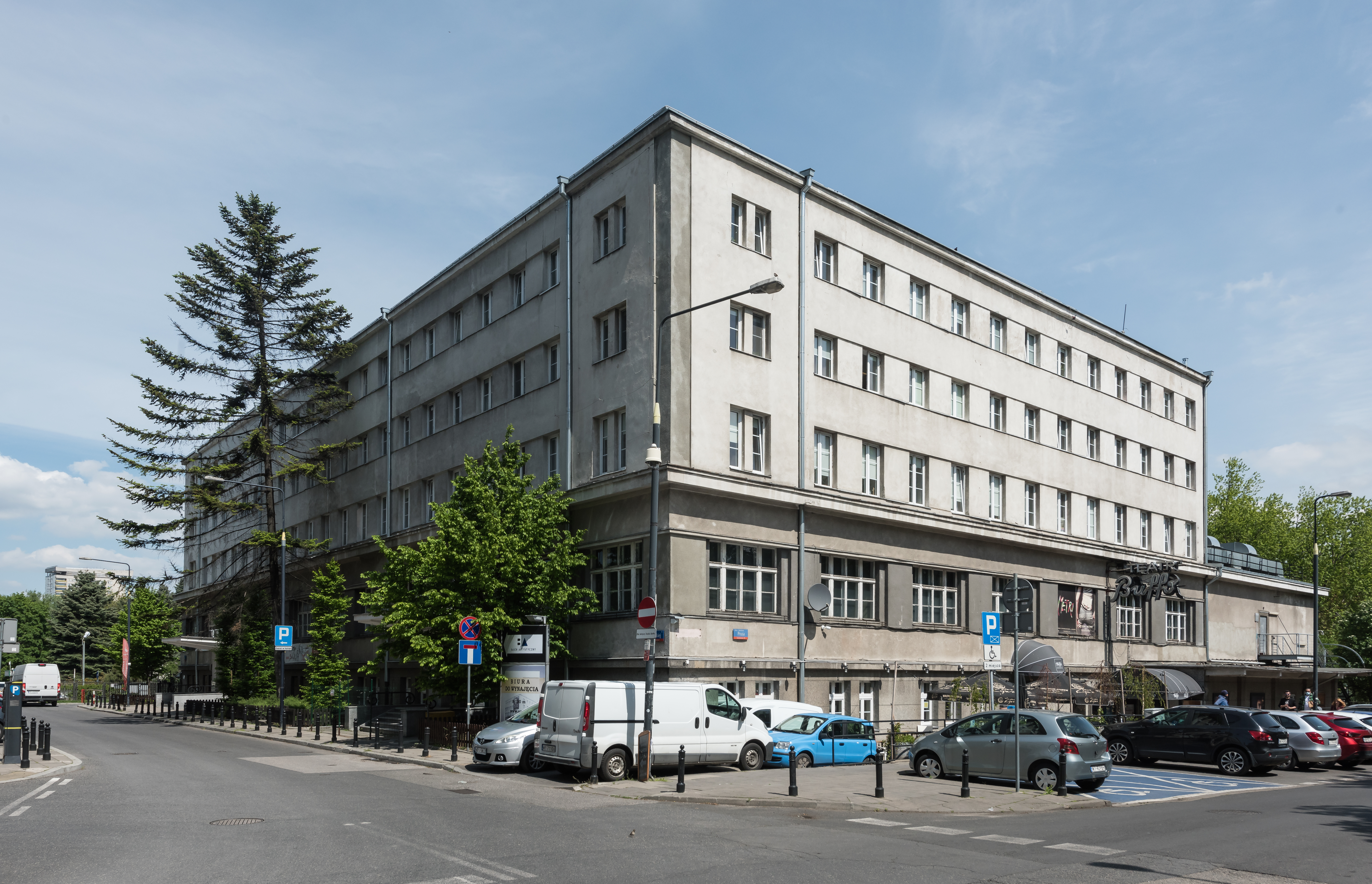
- Headquarters of the Polish Scouting Association in the YMCA building
- Established: 2001
- Location: Konopnickiej 6 Warsaw, Poland
- Coordinates: 52°13′42″N 21°1′34″E
- Type: History museum
- Director: Katarzyna K. Traczyk
- Curator: Andrzej Janowski
- Website: www.muzeumharcerstwa.pl

The Museum of Scouting (Polish: Muzeum Harcerstwa) is a museum in Warsaw, dedicated to the scout movement in Poland. Established in 2001, it contains displays relating to the history of Polish scouts and scouting. The goals of the museum are to collect and house items related to the history of Polish scouting and Scouting; disseminate information about the collections; evangelize the values of scouting and the educational principles of Scouting; and shape the values of those who come in contact with the collections.

== Background ==
As far back as 1916, the idea of establishing a museum dedicated to the collection of mementos and diffusion of knowledge about scouting. During the interwar period, Waclaw Blazejewski worked to establish the museum and build a facility to house the collection, but his efforts were by the outbreak World War II. After the Polish Scouting Association (ZHP) was reactivated, scouting memorabilia and documents were collected by the organization. The result of this effort was the creation of the Museum of Scouting. On June 6, 2001, ZHP president, Wiesław Maślanka, the museum was established, encouraging all Polish scouts to participate. In 2005–2010, the museum's exhibitions were housed at the Egyptian Temple in Lazienki Park. In 2010, the museum collections were moved to the building Headquarters of the Polish Scouting Association in Warsaw.

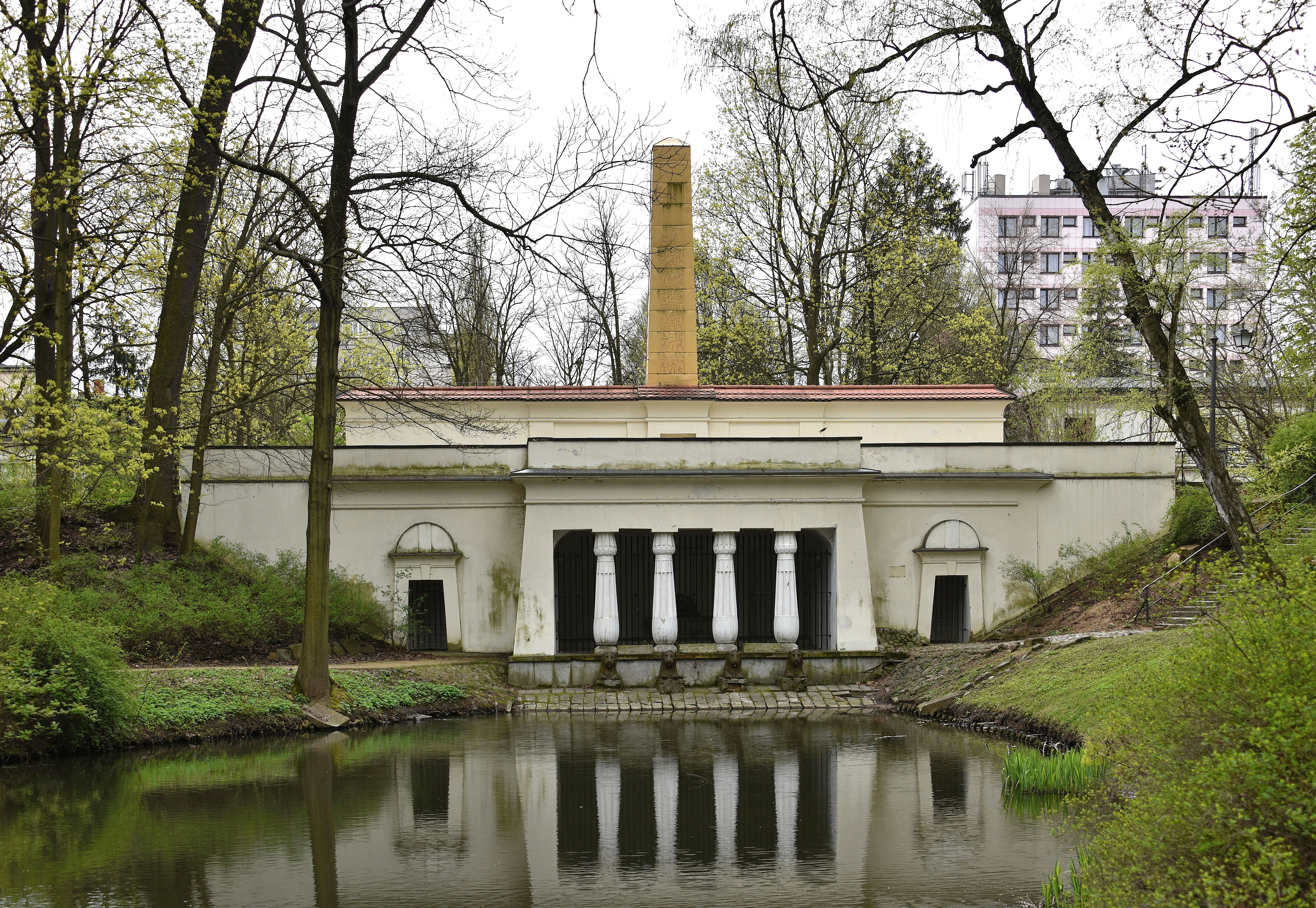
The Egyptian Temple in Lazienki Park - from 2005–2010 the home of the Museum of Scouting

To achieve its goals the museum collects cultural goods related to scouting; inventories, catalogs and processes of the collected museum objects and documentation materials; and secures and maintains museum exhibits. The collections are stored and organized in conditions that ensure their safety and easy access for scientific research. Permanent, temporary and traveling exhibitions are organized to educate in the realm of scouting and guiding - in cooperation with institutions and associations with similar goals.

== Exhibitions ==
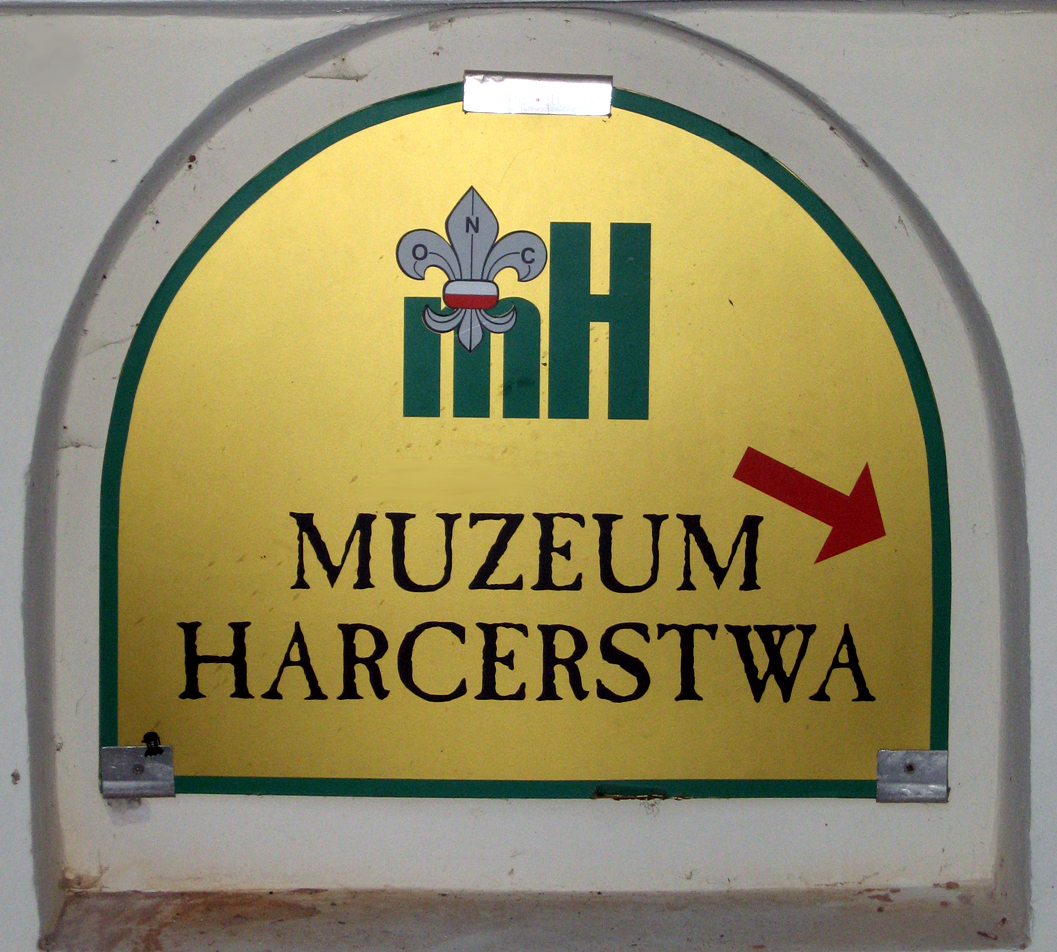
The Scouting Museum plaque on the wall of the Egyptian Temple in Lazienki Park in Warsaw

From 2001 through 2013, the museum organized the following exhibitions:

- Warsaw before the 100th anniversary of scouting (Warsaw, 2002)
- Independence marked by scouting (Warsaw, 2002)
- Aleksander Kamiński - life as service, service with life (Warsaw, 2003)
- Wincenty Frelich's patron of girl scouts and scouts (Warsaw, 2003)
- Above us the white eagle - history of cooperation between the army and scouting (Wrocław, 2003)
- History of the Scout Posts on the 90th anniversary of their creation (Warsaw, 2004)
- Did they have a different youth-military scouting service (Warsaw, 2004)
- Military scout service (2004)
- European scouting community on the 70th anniversary of the jubilee Scouting Rally in Spała (Warsaw, Tomaszów Mazowiecki, 2005)
- Scouting Lviv 1911-1939 (Warsaw, 2005)
- Serve my whole life - scouting achievements in the period of fights with the occupant (Warsaw, 2005)
- The history of scout and scout mail (Warsaw, Rottenburg, Wieluń, Kraków, 2006)
- Sea and sailing education as a scout school of patriotism (Gdynia, Warsaw, Kielce, 2006-2007)
- Grunwald in the tradition of the Polish Scouting Association (Warsaw, Grunwald, 2007, in collaboration with Wspólnota Drużyn Grunwaldzkich)
- Beginnings - the scouting movement on Polish soil 1910-1921 (Kielce, 2007)
- Scouting Decades (Łódź, Warsaw, Kielce, 2007)
- Scout service of memory - care of scouts and scouts over the legionary cemeteries in Volhynia (Warsaw, 2007)
- The history of the scout uniform (Kielce, 2008)
- Olga and Andrzej Małkowski, the creators of scouting Warsaw, 2008)
- Today, Tomorrow, The Day After Tomorrow - scouts and scouts in the service of the Polish Underground State (Warsaw, 2009)
- Scouting decades. 100th anniversary of scouting exhibition (Krakow, 2010)
- Scouting decades. tradition of the Polish Armed Forces in the 100th anniversary of scouting (Krakow, Warsaw, 2010)
- Scoutmaster Władysław Skoraczewski - biographical exhibition on the 30th anniversary of his death (Warsaw, 2010)
- Scouts in Legions (Warsaw 2013)

== Bibliography ==
- Traczyk, Katarzyna K. "O muzeum". Strona Muzeum Harcerstwa (in Polish).
- Tazbirowa, Julia [in Polish] (2011). Harcerskie Tradycje Oręża Polskiego w zbiorach Muzeum Harcerstwa (in Polish). Warsaw. OCLC 891234288.
