= Oscar M. Alcaraz =

Oscar Magan Alcaráz (4 May 1953 – 30 August 1970) was a Scout and Junior Forest Ranger of Eulogio Rodriguez Jr. High School in La Loma, Quezon City. His Scout unit, Explorer Post 14, was registered with the Quezon City Council of the Boy Scouts of the Philippines. Alcaráz drowned at the La Mesa Dam Reforestation Project of the Boy Scouts of the Philippines, the Philippine National Bank, and the Reforestation Administration when he got entangled in water plants that prevented his escape after conducting a swimming rescue of his drowning Scoutmaster. Alcaráz was the first non-military, non-President, to be buried (31 October 1970) at the Libingan ng mga Bayani, Fort Bonifacio. He was posthumously conferred a Gold Medal of Merit (Posthumous) highest award for gallantry by the Boy Scouts of the Philippines. He was also awarded "The Presidential Merit Medal" by President Ferdinand E. Marcos on 11 September 1970 at the Malacanang Palace.

== Bibliography ==
- Antonio, Antonio, "Boy Scout loses his life to save teacher" in Daily Sun, September 1, 1970.
- Escudero, Erlinda, "Boy scout drowns saving camp official at La Mesa Dam" in Daily Star, Vol. 4, No. 128, Sept. 1, 1970.
- "Scout Dies in QC Lake Rescuing Camp Chief" in The Philippines Herald, September 1, 1970.
- "Boy Scout Nalunod sa Pagsagip!" in Pilipino Star, Taon II, Blg. 228, Setiembre 1, 1970.
- "Scout dies in heroic rescue bid" in The Manila Times.
- "Nalunod, 17 anyos na scout!" in Taliba, Septiyembre 1, 1970.
- Rodrigo, Soc, "Bayaning Scouter" in Taliba, Septiyembre 2, 1970.
- "Explorer scout honored" in The Manila Times, Sept. 12, 1970.
- "Scout Hero Gets FM Medal" in The Manila Chronicle, September 12, 1970.
- "Boy scout hero gets posthumous Palace award" in Daily Star, Vol. 4, No. 137, Sept. 12, 1970.
- "Scout hero gets medal from Marcos" in World Current Events, September 21, 1970.
- "FM HONORS QC SCOUT HERO" in The Gazette, Vol. XVI No. 6, November–December 1970, Boy Scouts of the Philippines.
- Diamond Jubilee Yearbook, Manila: Boy Scouts of the Philippines, 1996.
- On My Honor: Stories of Scouts in Action, Manila: Boy Scouts of the Philippines, 2001, page 15.
