= Jugendburg =

Youth castle in Germany

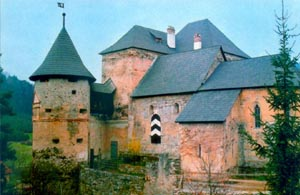
The Streitwiesen youth castle is an example of a castle ruin renovated by young people

A Jugendburg, sometimes referred to in English as a youth castle, is a medieval castle in German-speaking countries that was converted during the 20th century into a public community centre or educational facility for young people. The sponsors of the original youth castles came mainly from the Wandervogel and Pfadfinder movement, or were at least linked to the youth movement.

== Terminology ==
The term Jugendburg originally referred to the use of castles (Burgen) by young people (Jugend).

The difference between Jugendburgen in this historical sense and Jugendburgen in the sense of castles that were used as youth hostels, for example run by the German Youth Hostel Association, is disputed. For example, youth hostels had already emerged in the early 20th century in the wake of the youth movement (Jugendbewegung) as accommodation for young men, youth groups and school classes. And as early as 1912 the first German youth hostel was established by Richard Schirrmann at Altena Castle (it was rebuilt from 1906 to 1915) above the town of Altena. During the Nazi era youth castles were used by the Hitler Youth and the League of German Girls, and the term was increasingly associated with Nazi ideology. From 1935 to 1943 there was also a schoolchildren's magazine with the title Deutsche Jugendburg ("German Youth Castle"), which was published by the National Socialist Teachers League.

== Jugendburgen in the youth movement ==
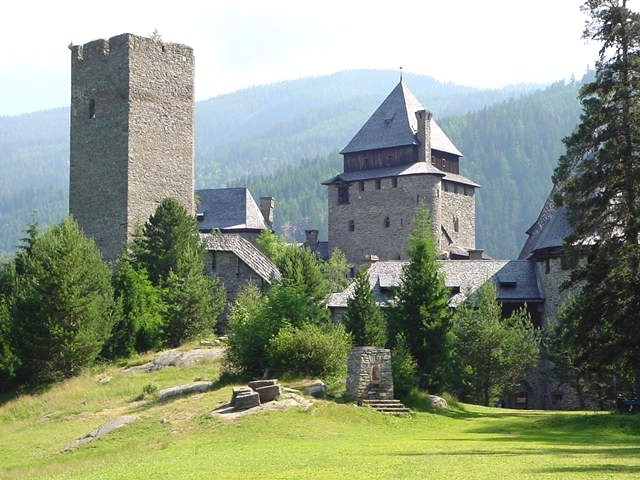
Finstergrün Castle belongs to the Evangelical Youth of Austria

In connexion with Jugendburgen one frequently comes across the names Gustav Wyneken, Robert Oelbermann and Karl Oelbermann.

In 1910, the progressive educationalist, Gustav Wyneken, was the chairman of the Bund für freie Schulgemeinden and publisher of its magazine. He also tried to found a new school or "Jugendburg" to serve his progressive educational project based on the concept of upbringing as the "Formation of People in the Sense of a Worldview" (Formung des Menschen im Sinne einer Weltanschauung). For Wyneken it was about a redefinition of the relationships between teacher and pupil. This was to be based on "comradeship" (Kameradschaft) and "leadership" (Führertum).

Using his pedagogical approach, Wyneken influenced the emerging youth movement as an adult from 1912 onwards. Wyneken created the concept of "youth culture" in opposition to the perceived subservience of Wilhelmine Germany as well as against school and family. In 1913, he worked to organise the First Free German Youth Day at the Hoher Meissner. Here, too, tensions arose, since Wyneken was a leader figure, a concept rejected by many groups at the youth day. The Freideutsche Jugend network which emerged that day around the Meissner Declaration had an anti-rationalist view point at odds with Wyneken's approach.

Fascinated by Wyneken's ideas, the brothers, Robert and Karl Oelbermann, dreamt of the Jugendburg concept after the First World War. Robert Oelbermann is considered to be the founder of the "Nerother Wandervogel - Federation for the Establishment of the Rhenish Youth Castle" (Nerother Wandervogel - Bund zur Errichtung der Rheinischen Jugendburg). By "Rhenish Jugendburg", he meant Waldeck Castle in the Hunsrück mountains. The Nerother Wandervogel was founded on 27 March 1921 at Drachenfels Castle at Busenberg in the Wasgau region of southwest Germany.

The Jugendburgen were mostly used to create an independent place of encounter whilst also preserving valuable historical monuments and giving them a new and meaningful use.

Nowadays, the aims of a Jugendburg are unchanged; it is about developing young people away from the perceived restrictions and conventions of society.

As the numbers of scouts and youth leagues continued to rise, the castles became international meeting places at which camps could be held.

== Jugendburgen in Germany ==
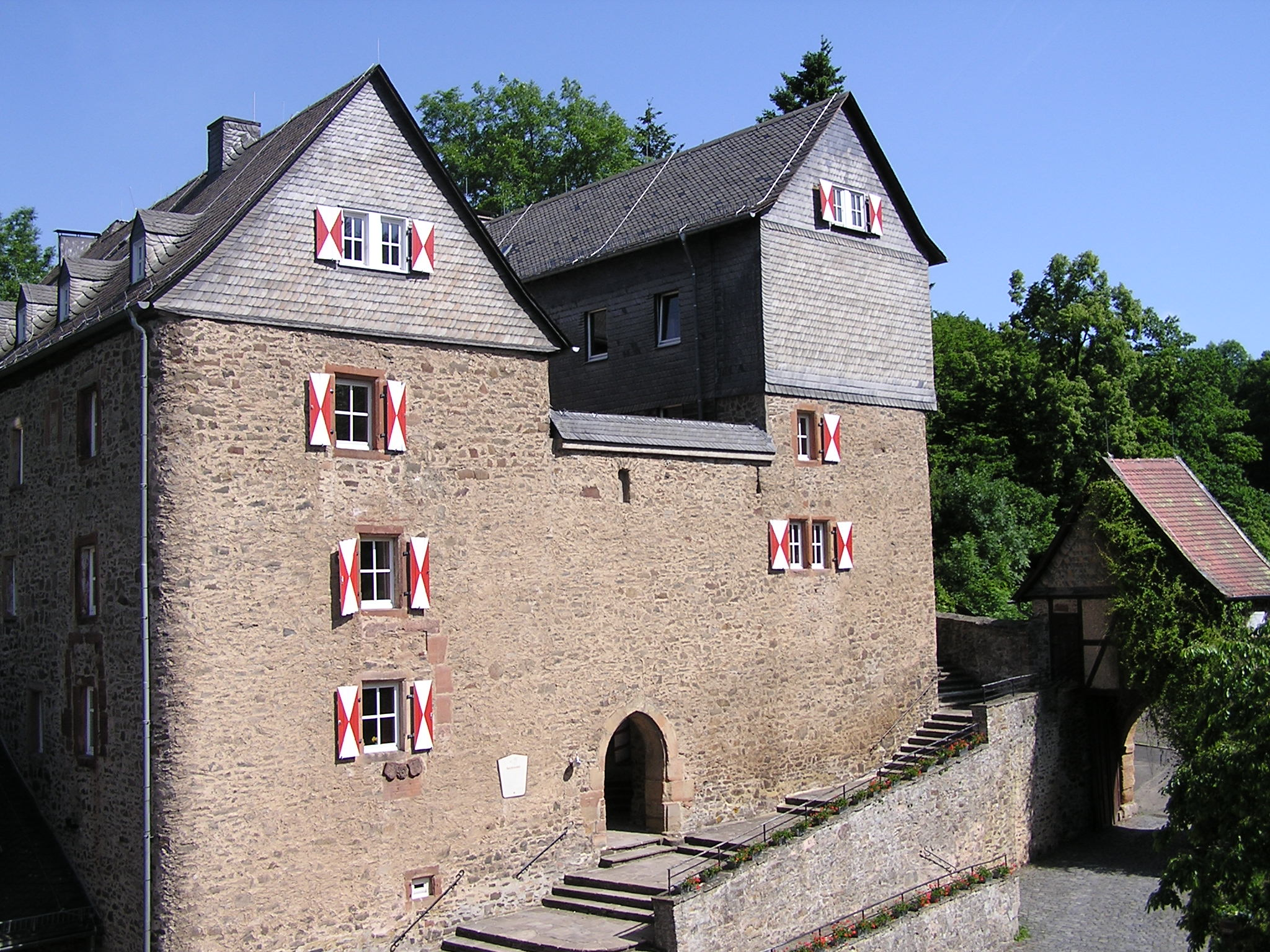
Hessenstein Castle

- Balduinstein Castle in Balduinstein (Rhineland-Palatinate), 1974
- Camburg Castle near Camburg (Thuringia), 1935
- Eichenkreuzburg near Bissendorf (Lower Saxony), 1928
- Schloss Ebersberg near Stuttgart (Baden-Württemberg), 1966
- Feuerstein Castle near Ebermannstadt (Bavaria), 1946
- Gemen Castle near Borken (North Rhine-Westphalia), 1946
- Hessenstein Castle near Vöhl-Ederbringhausen (North Hesse), 1922
- Hoheneck Castle near Ipsheim (Bavaria), 1984
- Hohenkrähen Castle near Singen (Hohentwiel) (Baden-Württemberg), 1956
- Hohensolms Castle near Gießen (Hesse), 1924
- Hohnstein Castle in Hohnstein (Saxon Switzerland) (Saxony), 1925
- Ludwigstein Castle near Witzenhausen (Hesse), 1920
- Schloss Mansfeld near Mansfeld (Saxony-Anhalt), 1947
- Monschau Castle near Monschau, 1919
- Neuerburg in Neuerburg (Rhineland-Palatinate), 1930
- Rieneck Castle near Rieneck (Bavaria), 1959
- Schloss Rotenberg near Rauenberg (Baden-Württemberg), 1950
- Rothenfels Castle near Rothenfels (Bavaria), 1919
- Schönburg near Oberwesel (Rhineland-Palatinate), 1951
- Schwaneck Castle near Pullach im Isartal (Bavaria), 1956
- Stahleck Castle in Bacharach on the Rhine (Rhineland-Palatinate), 1925
- Waldeck Castle near Dorweiler (Rhineland-Palatinate), 1922 (1910)
- Wernfels Castle near Spalt (Bavaria), 1925

== Jugendburgen in Austria ==
- Finstergrün Castle near Ramingstein (Salzburg), 1946
- Jugendburg Streitwiesen near Weiten (Lower Austria), 1972
- Wildegg Castle near Sittendorf (Lower Austria), 1947

== Jugendburgen in Switzerland ==
- Rotberg Castle near Metzerlen-Mariastein (Solothurn), 1935
