= Deutscher Pfadfinderverband =

Voluntary association

- Country: Germany
- Founded: 1970
- Membership: 29,000
- Website http://www.dpvonline.de/

The Deutsche Pfadfinderverband (DPV; approximate translation: German Scout Association) is an umbrella federation of sixteen German non-denominational Scouting associations. It was founded in 1970 and serves about 29,000 members.

== History ==
The DPV was founded in 1970 under the name Deutsche Pfadfinder by a number of regional organizations which had left the Bund Deutscher Pfadfinder (BDP) due to the perceived loss of political neutrality within the latter. In 1971, the Deutscher Pfadfinderbund joined the Deutsche Pfadfinder and the federation was renamed to Deutscher Pfadfinderverband. However, the Deutscher Pfadfinderbund left the federation after some years.

In 1977, the DPV was amongst the founding members of the Deutscher Pfadfinderring (DPR); this traditional Scouting federation tried to form a counterweight to the Ring deutscher Pfadfinderverbände and the Ring Deutscher Pfadfinderinnenverbände. The DPR was disbanded in 1995.

An application for membership in the Ring deutscher Pfadfinderverbände in May 1985 was rejected. The member organizations of the Ring deutscher Pfadfinderverbände requested a merger of the DPV and the Bund der Pfadfinderinnen und Pfadfinder prior to an integration in its ranks. Negotiations between the DPV and the Bund der Pfadfinderinnen und Pfadfinder were closed unsuccessfully in 1989.

At the 2007 annual general meeting in Berlin, the Europa-Scouts resigned from membership in the DPV due to permanently low membership figures. At the same meeting, the Pfadfinder und Pfadfinderinnenbund Nordlicht was accepted as an associate member.

The 52nd anniversary was celebrated in September 2022 as DPV GoLd (L as 50 in roman numerals) at Ludwigstein Castle. The original plans for celebrating the 50th anniversary in 2020 had to be postponed due to the corona pandemic. It was celebrated as a radio show instead.

== Member associations ==
The DPV has a total of sixteen member associations. With the exceptions of Deutscher Pfadfinderbund Mosaik and Pfadfinderbund Weltenbummler, all members are regional organizations. The membership numbers of the component organizations vary widely between 100 and 8,000 Scouts.

Full members

- Bund Europäischer Pfadfinder, member of the Confédération Européenne de Scoutisme
- Deutscher Pfadfinderbund Hamburg
- Deutscher Pfadfinderbund Mosaik
- Deutscher Pfadfinderbund Nordland
- Jomsburg – freier Pfadfinderbund
- Pfadfinderbund Boreas (since 2010)
- Pfadfinderbund Horizonte
- Pfadfinderbund Mecklenburg-Vorpommern
- Pfadfinderbund Weltenbummler, member of the World Federation of Independent Scouts
- Pfadfinderschaft Grenzland
- Pfadfinderschaft Nordmark
- Pfadfinderschaft Süddeutschland
- Pfadfinder- und Pfadfinderinnenbund Nord
- Verband Deutscher Pfadfinder

Associate members

- Freie Pfadfinderschaft
- Pfadfinder und Pfadfinderinnenbund Nordlicht

Former members

- Deutsche Pfadfinder Landesmark Westfalen (...–2010)
- Deutscher Pfadfinderbund
- Deutscher Pfadfinderverband Gau Westland (...–2010)
- Europa-Scouts
- Pfadfinderbund Nordbaden
- Pfadfinderbund Süd (1970–1981)
- Pfadfinderschaft Phoenix (...–2010)
