= DPV =

DPV may refer to:

== Businesses and organisations ==
- Deutscher Pressevertrieb, a German media distributor
- Democratic Party of Virginia, an American political party
- Deutscher Pfadfinderverband, a German Scouting federation

== Maritime ==
- Diver Propulsion Vehicle, in diving equipment
- Dynamically Positioned Vessel, a ship which automatically holds position

== Other uses ==
- Delegated Path Validation, in cryptography
- Desert Patrol Vehicle, a military vehicle
- Differential pulse voltammetry, in chemistry
- Delivery Point Validation, in the US Postal Service
