= VDZ =

VDZ may refer to:

- IATA code for Valdez Airport
- Verband Deutscher Zoodirektoren (German Federation of Zoo Directors)
- Verband Deutscher Zeitschriftenverleger (Association of German Magazine Publishers) in Deutscher Pressevertrieb
- Verein Deutscher Zementwerke (German Cement Works Association) in Refuse-derived fuel
