= Ring deutscher Pfadfinderverbände =

German national Scouting organization

- German Scout Federation
- Location: Mühlendamm 3; 10178 Berlin
- Country: Germany
- Founded: 1949
- Defunct: 2021
- Membership: 115,944
- Affiliation: World Organization of the Scout Movement
- Website http://www.pfadfinden-in-deutschland.de/

The Ring deutscher Pfadfinderverbände (RdP; German Scout Federation) was the German national Scouting organization within the World Organization of the Scout Movement (WOSM). It served 115,944 members (as of 2011).

The RdP was founded as Ring deutscher Pfadfinderbünde in 1949 by three Scouting associations:

- Bund Deutscher Pfadfinder (BDP, interreligious)
- Christliche Pfadfinderschaft Deutschlands (CPD, Protestant)
- Deutsche Pfadfinderschaft Sankt Georg (DPSG, Roman Catholic).

It became a member of WOSM in 1950.

In 1973, following the disintegration of the BDP and the merger of the CPD with its Guiding counterparts, it was renamed the Ring deutscher Pfadfinderverbände. The current members are:

- Bund der Pfadfinderinnen und Pfadfinder (BdP, interreligious, co-ed)
- Deutsche Pfadfinderschaft Sankt Georg (DPSG, Roman Catholic, co-ed)
- Verband Christlicher Pfadfinderinnen und Pfadfinder (VCP, Protestant, co-ed).
- Bund Muslimischer Pfadfinder und Pfadfinderinnen Deutschlands (BMPPD, Muslim, co-ed)

Three of these, the BdP, the VCP, and the BMPPD, were also members of the World Association of Girl Guides and Girl Scouts, via the Ring Deutscher Pfadfinderinnenverbände. Both federations worked strongly together in the main fields of Scouting and Guiding.

In 2021, Ring deutscher Pfadfinderverbände and Ring Deutscher Pfadfinderinnenverbände merged, forming the Ring deutscher Pfadfinder*innenverbände.

== See also ==
- Scouting in Germany
