= Ring Deutscher Pfadfinderinnenverbände =

- German Guide Federation
- Location: Mühlendamm 3; 10178 Berlin
- Country: Germany
- Founded: 1949
- Defunct: 2021
- Membership: 47,688
- Affiliation: World Association of Girl Guides and Girl Scouts
- Website http://www.pfadfinden-in-deutschland.de/

The Ring Deutscher Pfadfinderinnenverbände (RDP; German Guide Federation) was the German national Guiding organization within the World Association of Girl Guides and Girl Scouts (WAGGGS). It served 47,688 members (as of 2008).

The RDP was founded as Ring Deutscher Pfadfinderinnenbünde in 1949 by four Guiding associations:

- Bund Deutscher Pfadfinderinnen (BDPi, interreligious)
- Evangelischer Mädchen-Pfadfinderbund (EMP, Protestant, not in Bavaria)
- Bund Christlicher Pfadfinderinnen (BCP, Protestant, only in Bavaria)
- Pfadfinderinnenschaft Sankt Georg (PSG, Roman Catholic).

It became an associate member of WAGGGS in 1950 and a full member in 1954.

In the 1970s, following merger of the EMP, the BCP and the BDPi with their respective Scouting counterparts, it was renamed Ring Deutscher Pfadfinderinnenverbände. The current members are:

- Bund der Pfadfinderinnen und Pfadfinder (BdP, interreligious, coeducational)
- Pfadfinderinnenschaft Sankt Georg (PSG, Roman Catholic, female only)
- Verband Christlicher Pfadfinderinnen und Pfadfinder (VCP, Protestant, coeducational)
- Bund Muslimischer Pfadfinder und Pfadfinderinnen Deutschlands (BMPPD, Muslim, coeducational).

Three of these, the BdP, the VCP, and the BMPPD, were also members of the World Organization of the Scout Movement, via the Ring deutscher Pfadfinderverbände. Both federations worked strongly together in the main fields of Scouting and Guiding.

In 2021, Ring Deutscher Pfadfinderinnenverbände and Ring deutscher Pfadfinderverbände merged, forming the Ring deutscher Pfadfinder*innenverbände.

== See also ==
- Scouting in Germany
