= Ring deutscher Pfadfinder*innenverbände =

German Scouting and Guiding organization

- German Guide and Scout Federation
- Location: Mühlendamm 3; 10178 Berlin
- Country: Germany
- Founded: 1949
- Affiliation: World Organization of the Scout Movement, World Association of Girl Guides and Girl Scouts
- Website https://www.pfadfinden-in-deutschland.de/

The Ring deutscher Pfadfinder*innenverbände (rdp; German Guide and Scout Federation) is the German national Scouting and Guiding organization within the World Organization of the Scout Movement (WOSM) and the World Association of Girl Guides and Girl Scouts (WAGGGS).

On 9 June 2021, the rdp was founded as a successor of the Ring deutscher Pfadfinderverbände and the Ring Deutscher Pfadfinderinnenverbände. Its member organizations are:

- Bund der Pfadfinderinnen und Pfadfinder (BdP, interreligious, co-ed)
- Bund Muslimischer Pfadfinder und Pfadfinderinnen Deutschlands (BMPPD, Muslim, co-ed)
- Deutsche Pfadfinderschaft Sankt Georg (DPSG, Roman Catholic, co-ed)
- Pfadfinderinnenschaft Sankt Georg (PSG, Roman Catholic, girls only)
- Verband Christlicher Pfadfinder*innen (VCP, Protestant, co-ed)

== See also ==
- Scouting in Germany
