= Anton Schnack =

German writer

- Born: 21 July 1892; Rieneck, Lower Franconia, Bavaria
- Died: 26 December 1973 (aged 81)
- Occupations: Novelist, Poet, Journalist
- Spouse: Maria Glöckler
- Writing career
- Genre: Poetry

Anton Schnack (21 July 1892 – 26 September 1973) was a German writer. He joined the German Army when World War I began. He is one of the leading German war poets of the First World War, and has been compared with English poet Wilfred Owen. After the war he became an editor for numerous publications. He was one of the 88 writers who pledged their allegiance to Adolf Hitler in October 1933 in a Vow of Most Faithful Allegiance (Gelöbnis treuester Gefolgschaft).

== Early life ==
Schnack was born in Rieneck, Lower Franconia, Bavaria. He was the third child of a station commander of the German gendarmerie. His older brother Friedrich Schnack (1888–1977) also became a writer, known for his works on natural history and children's literature.

Schack followed his father's official postings around Bavaria, to Dettelbach, Kronach and Hammelburg. He attended the Progymnasium in Hammelburg (predecessor of the Frobenius-Gymnasium Hammelburg). He became a journalist, and worked in Halberstadt and Bolzano.

== First World War poetry ==
Schnack served in the Imperial German Army during the First World War. He was wounded in 1916. He began to publish poetry in Die Aktion in 1915, but only published poetry on war subjects from 1917. His first war poem was "Schwester Maria" ("Sister Maria"), published in Die Aktion in January 1917. He continued to publish war poems in three collections that he published in 1919, Strophen der Gier ("Verses of greed"), Der Abenteurer ("The adventurer") and Die tausend Gelächter ("The thousand laughs").

He published his most significant collection of war poetry, Tier rang gewaltig mit Tier ("Beast strove mightily with beast") in 1920, in a limited edition of 1,000 copies. This short work of around 80 pages contains 60 poems based on the sonnet form, on themes of night and death. In his 1985 book in German war poetry, Patrick Bridgwater, Emeritus Professor of German at the University of Durham, described Schnack's book as "the best single collection produced by a German war poet in 1914-1918", and one work, "Nächtliche Landschaft", as the "best poem of the war written in German".

His poem "Verdun" was published in 1919 in the first edition of the socialist journal Das Tribunal. He also wrote a remarkable poem about desertion, entitled Der Überläufer ("The deserter").

== Later life ==
After the end of the First World War, he became an editor in Darmstadt. From 1920 to 1925, he was a literary editor and theatre critic for the Neuen Badischen Landes-Zeitung in Mannheim. He married Maria Glöckler on 24 October 1924. He travelled in France, Italy and Dalmatia before returning to Mannheim and then settled in Berchtesgaden. He was one of the 88 writers who pledged their allegiance to Adolf Hitler in October 1933 in a Vow of Most Faithful Allegiance (Gelöbnis treuester Gefolgschaft). He published lighter popular works in the 1930s and 1940s, including his 1935 work Kleines Lesebuch. In addition to his poetry, he also wrote some short plays, a few novellas and two novels, Zugvögel der Liebe (1936) and Der finstere Franz (1937). His later works have less literary merit, and are overshadowed by his support for the Nazis.

He moved to Frankfurt am Main in 1937, and joined the Wehrmacht (German Army) in 1944. He was captured by US forces. After the Second World War, he settled to Kahl am Main, where he later died in 1973.

== Works ==
Poetry

- 1919 - Strophen der Gier
  Der Abenteurer
  Die tausend Gelächter
- 1920 - Tier rang gewaltig mit Tier
- 1936 - Die Flaschenpost
  Die Verstoßenen
- 1947 - Der Annoncenleser
- 1948 - Mittagswein
- 1953 - Jene Dame, welche ...

Prose

- 1934 - Kalender-Kantate
- 1935 - Kleines Lesebuch
- 1937 - Der gute Nachmittag
- 1938 - Die bunte Hauspostille
- 1940 - Begegnungen am Abend
- 1941 - Jugendlegende
- 1946 - Die Angel des Robinson
  Arabesken um das ABC
  Mädchenmedaillons
- 1949 - Phantastische Geographie
- 1951 - Das fränkische Jahr
- 1954 - Buchstabenspiel
- 1956 - Die Reise aus Sehnsucht
  Flirt mit dem Alltag
- 1957 - Brevier der Zärtlichkeit
- 1961 - Schöne Mädchennamen
- 1964 - Weinfahrt nach Franken

Novels

- 1936 - Zugvögel der Liebe
- 1937 - Der finstere Franz

== Bibliography ==
Notes

References

- Bridgwater, Patrick (1985). The German poets of the First World War (1985 ed.). Taylor & Francis. ISBN 978-0-7099-3237-6. - Total pages: 209
- Furness, Raymond (1997). Companion to Twentieth-Century German Literature (1997 ed.). CRC Press. ISBN 978-0-203-36042-2. - Total pages: 316
- Watanabe-O'Kelly, Helen (2000). The Cambridge history of German literature (2000 ed.). Cambridge University Press. ISBN 978-0-521-78573-0. - Total pages: 613
- "German Poetry and the First World War", Patrick Bridgwater, European History Quarterly, 1971
