= Franconian Heights Nature Park =

Nature park in Bavaria, Germany

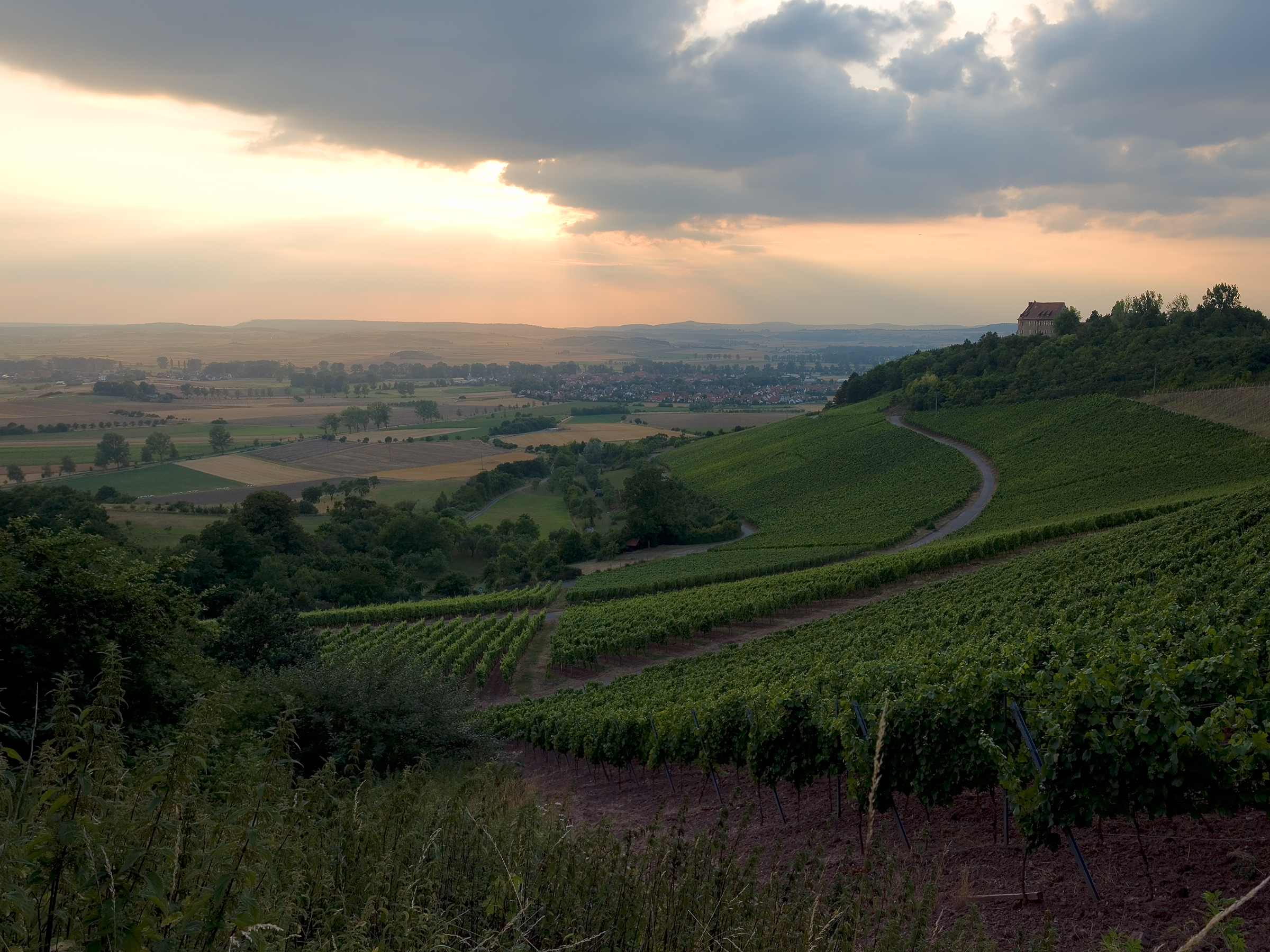
- In the north towards the Aisch, vineyards of Hoheneck Castle border the nature park.

- Location within Bavaria Location within Germany
- Location: Bavaria, Germany
- Coordinates: 49°22′33″N 10°29′01″E
- Area: 2.45 km^{2} (0.95 sq mi)
- Established: 2016
- Governing body: Ministerium Bayerisches Staatsministerium für Umwelt und Verbraucherschutz

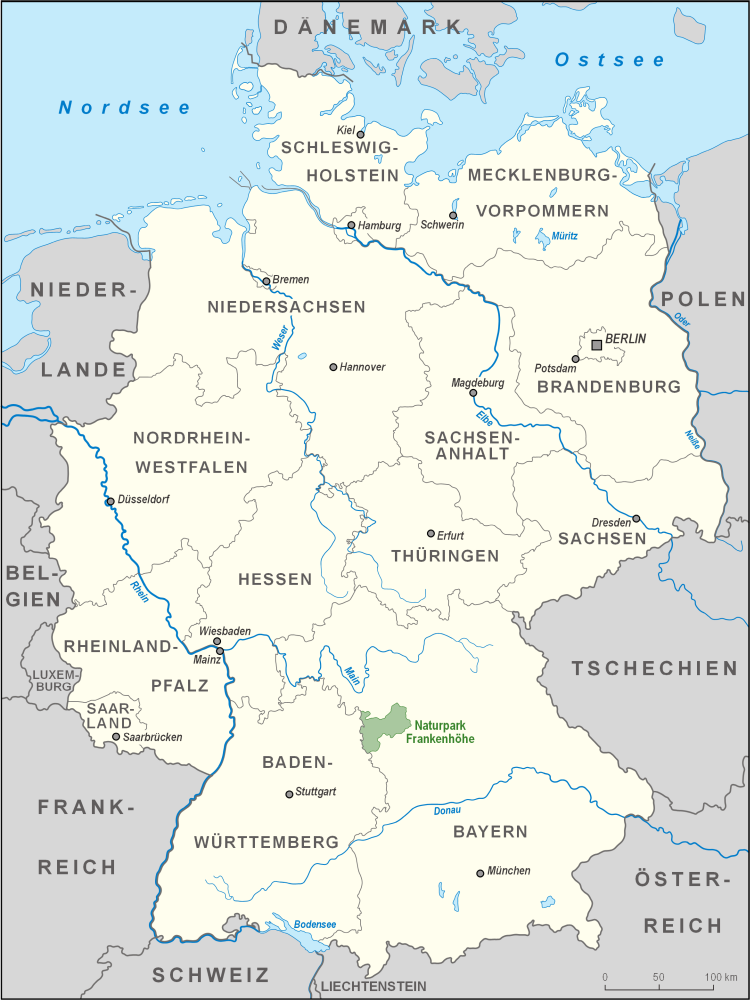
Location of the Franconian Heights Nature Park

The Franconian Heights Nature Park (German: Naturpark Frankenhöhe) is a nature park in Germany that covers an area of approximately 1,100 square kilometres. It is located northeast of the town of Rothenburg ob der Tauber in Bavaria and covers most of the hill ridge known as the Franconian Heights, as well as areas to the west and up to the Sulzach. The nature park is in one of the sunniest areas of southern Germany and offers a very varied landscape with mixed forests, rivers, vineyards and dry habitats.

== See also ==
- List of nature parks in Germany
