= Deutscher Pfadfinderbund Mosaik =

- Country: Germany
- Affiliation: Deutscher Pfadfinderverband
- Website https://www.dpbm.de/

The Deutsche Pfadfinderbund Mosaik (DPBM) is the largest member of the Deutscher Pfadfinderverband (DPV). Like all Scout associations in DPV, it is interdenominational and politically independent. Its legal entity is the registered association Pfadfinder-Bundesamt in Cologne. The DPBM is recognized as a charitable organization and supports voluntary youth welfare nationwide.

The ancestor of the DPBM was the Deutscher Pfadfinderbund between 1911 and the mid-1920s and later Scouting organizations on the political right, before 1933 and after 1945. The last and most notable of these was the "Deutscher Pfadfinderbund Westmark" which changed its name to Deutscher Pfadfinderbund Mosaik during a process of interior democratization in the 1980s.
