= Rieneck Castle =

Hilltop castle in Bavaria

- Burg Rieneck
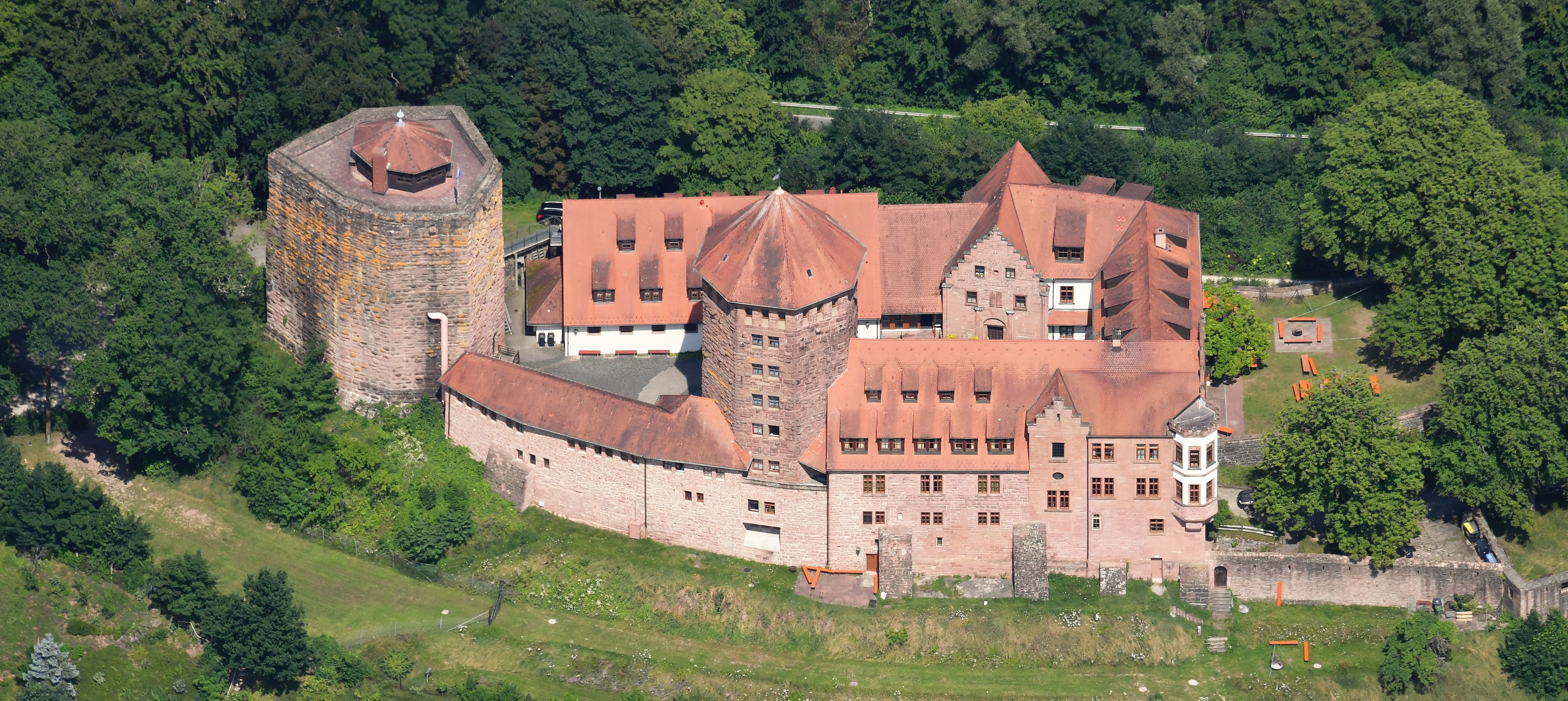
- Rieneck Castle

- Location within Bavaria Location within Germany

General information
- Type: hill castle
- Location: Rieneck, Germany
- Coordinates: 50°05′40″N 9°38′46″E
- Construction started: ca. 1150
- Owner: Verband Christlicher Pfadfinderinnen und Pfadfinder

Rieneck Castle (German: Burg Rieneck) is a hill castle located in the town of Rieneck, in Bavaria, southern Germany. It was built by Ludwig I, Count of Loon and Rieneck, around the year 1150. It is today used by the German Christian Guide and Scout Association.

Rieneck Castle sits on a hill in the town of Rieneck, overlooking the Sinn river. It is located in the Spessart hills, in the Main-Spessart district of Bavaria, about 80 km east of Frankfurt.

== Background ==
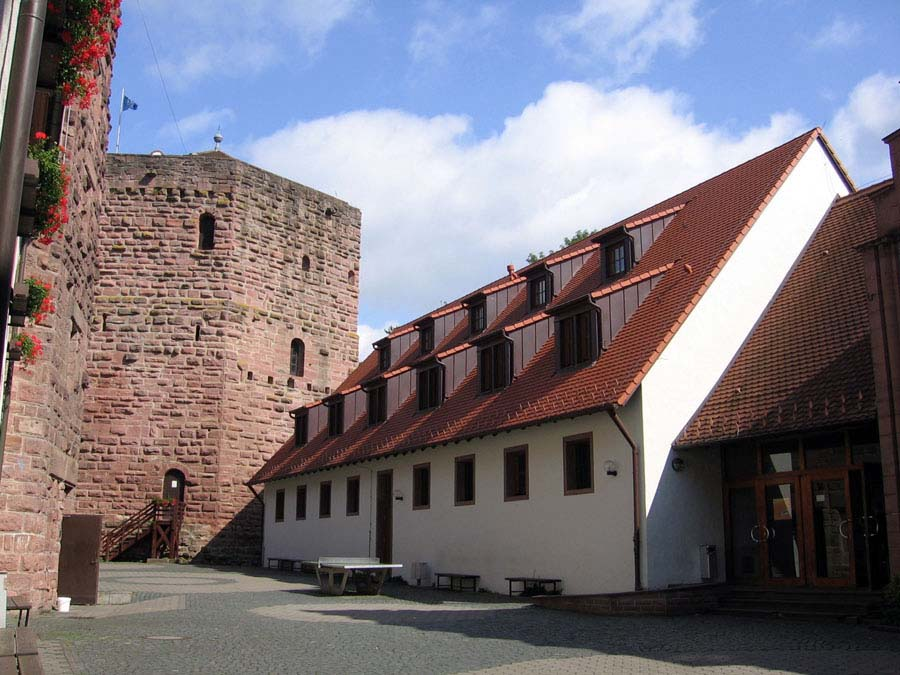
A view from inside Rieneck Castle

In 1150 Ludwig I, Count of Loon and Rieneck, ordered the building of the castrum Rinecke on the northeastern boundary of his territory, with the aim of safeguarding the lands of this aristocratic family against the neighbouring lordships of Mainz, Würzburg and Fulda. The little hill in the Sinn valley offered excellent conditions: there was only one direction where the castle required additional protection by a defensive ditch, and offered as narrow a front as possible to attack. The latter can be clearly seen in the ground plan of the keep, the 19-metre high "Thick Tower", which is outwardly an irregular, seven-sided polygon, whose tip points towards the nearby hill. The castle complex initially consisted simply of a courtyard surrounded by defensive walls, and the keep, with its 4 to 8-metre thick walls. Inside the walls half-timbered buildings were constructed as living quarters, store rooms, and stables. Of these only what we now know as the "arched cellar" survives.

== Today ==
The castle today serves as a scouting facility and is owned by the German Christian Guide and Scout Association VCP. The castle's programme includes scouting activities such as arts and crafts, pioneering and Medieval trades and offers accommodation and a campsite. The Hesse branch of VCP holds its annual Federal Assembly meeting at the castle.

In March, April and May 2020, it was reported that, due to the COVID-19 pandemic restrictions in Bavaria, the castle's continued operation as a scout facility, was under financial threat, with bookings, beginning at in early June, curtailed until December.

== See also ==
- Scouting in Germany
