= Monschau Castle =

- Burg Monschau
- Monschau
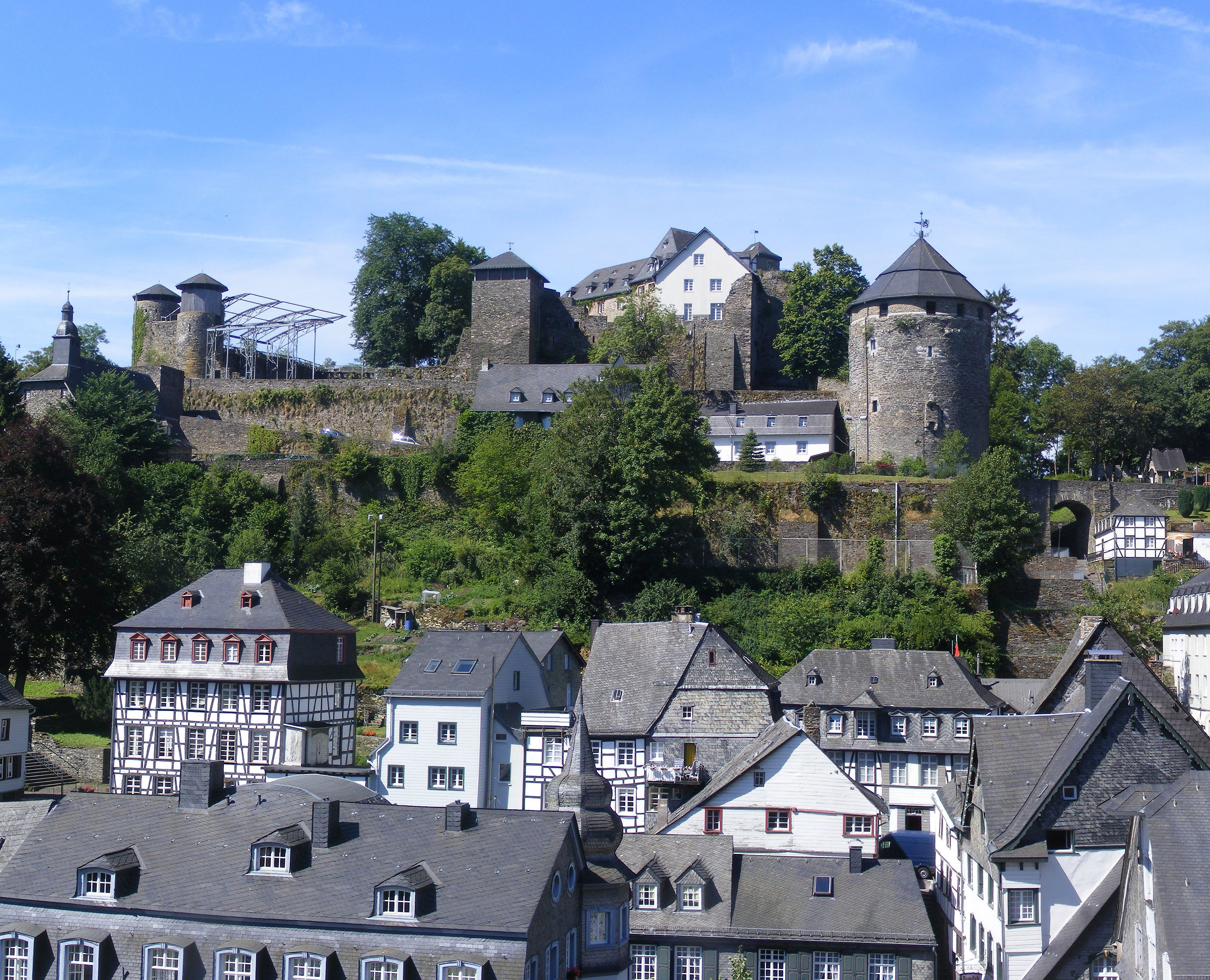
- View from the other side of the valley. The youth hostel building may be seen above the historic walls and on the left-hand side is the steel frame for the roof of the Monschau Classic

Site information
- Type: hill castle
- Code: DE-NW
- Condition: preserved

Location
- Coordinates: 50°33′11″N 6°14′23″E
- Height: Height missing, see template documentation

Site history
- Built: 13th century
- Materials: rusticated ashlar

Garrison information
- Occupants: counts

Monschau Castle (German: Burg Monschau) is a castle in the eponymous town of Monschau in the southern part of the Region of Aachen in Germany. It is used today as a youth hostel and in summer as a venue for concerts and operas.

== History ==
The hill castle is first recorded in 1217 as castrum in Munjoje by Archbishop Engelbert I of Cologne. It was expanded in the middle of the 14th century into a fortress for the counts of Jülich and equipped with mighty ring walls and wall walks. In 1543 troops of Emperor Charles V besieged the site with heavy guns, captured it and plundered it together with the town of Monschau.

In the early 19th century the French administration declared the castle to be state property and sold it to a private buyer who had the roofs removed in 1836 and 1837 in order to avoid building tax. As a result, the castle fell into ruins until, in the early 20th century, the government of the Rhine province secured and repaired it. After the First World War a youth hostel was opened in the west wing. So Monschau Castle survived as a "youth castle" (Jugendburg). In 1971 Christo and others repackaged the castle as a work of art.

== Haller ==
Within sight of the castle, on the other side of town, is another fortification, the Haller. It is disputed as to whether it was an outpost of the castle, a detached watchtower or the remains of an older castle site.

== Gallery ==
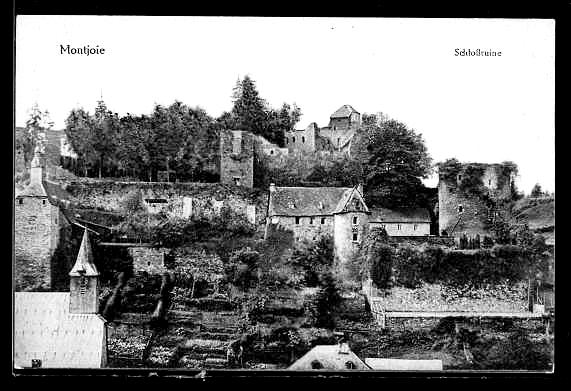
Historic postcard of the castle with its roofs removed

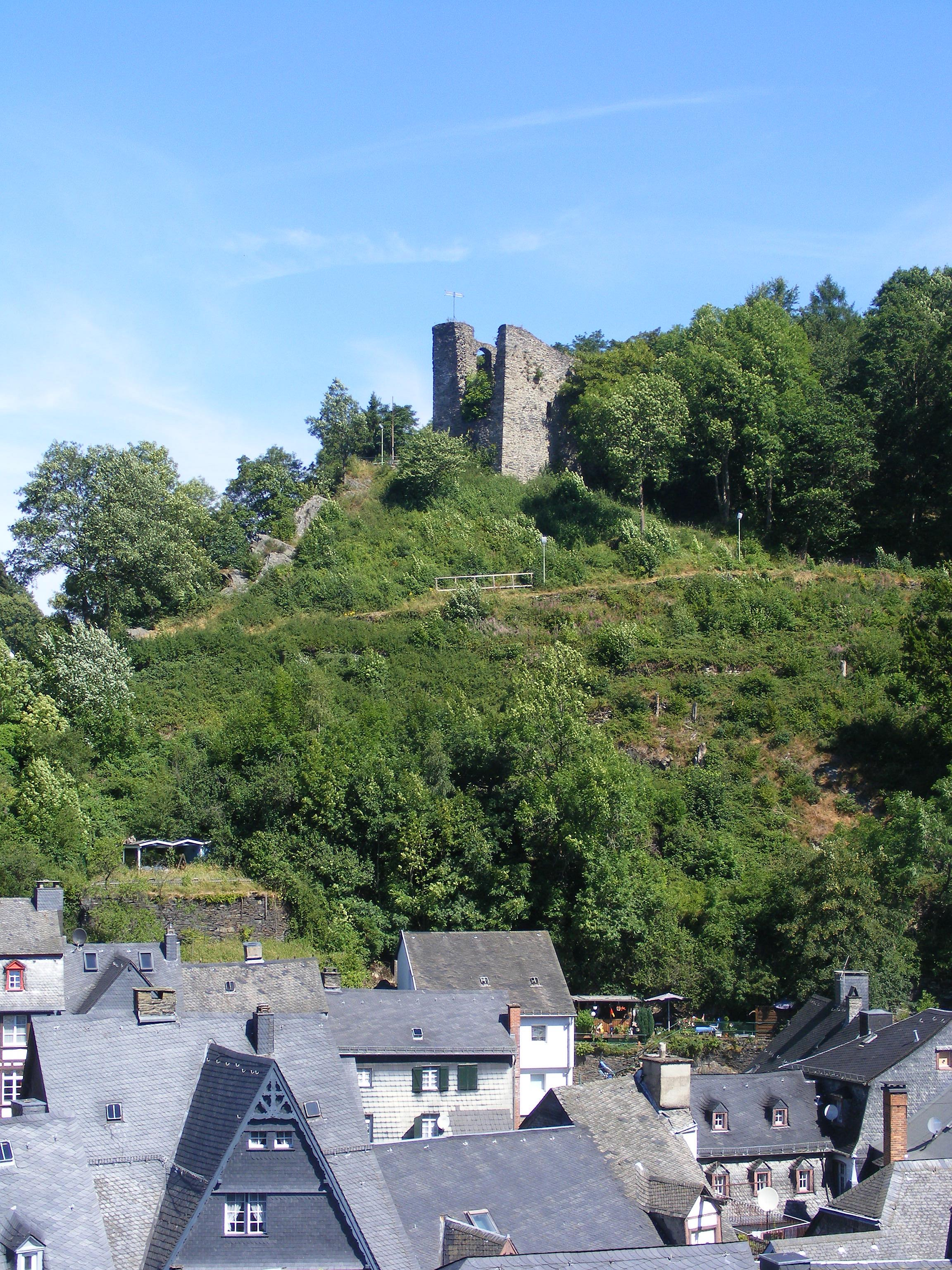
The Haller ruins
