= Pfadfinderbund Weltenbummler =

Scouting association in Germany

Pfadfinderbund Weltenbummler e.V.
- Headquarters: Nuremberg
- Country: Germany
- Founded: 1981
- Affiliation: World Federation of Independent Scouts
- Website http://www.pbw.org/

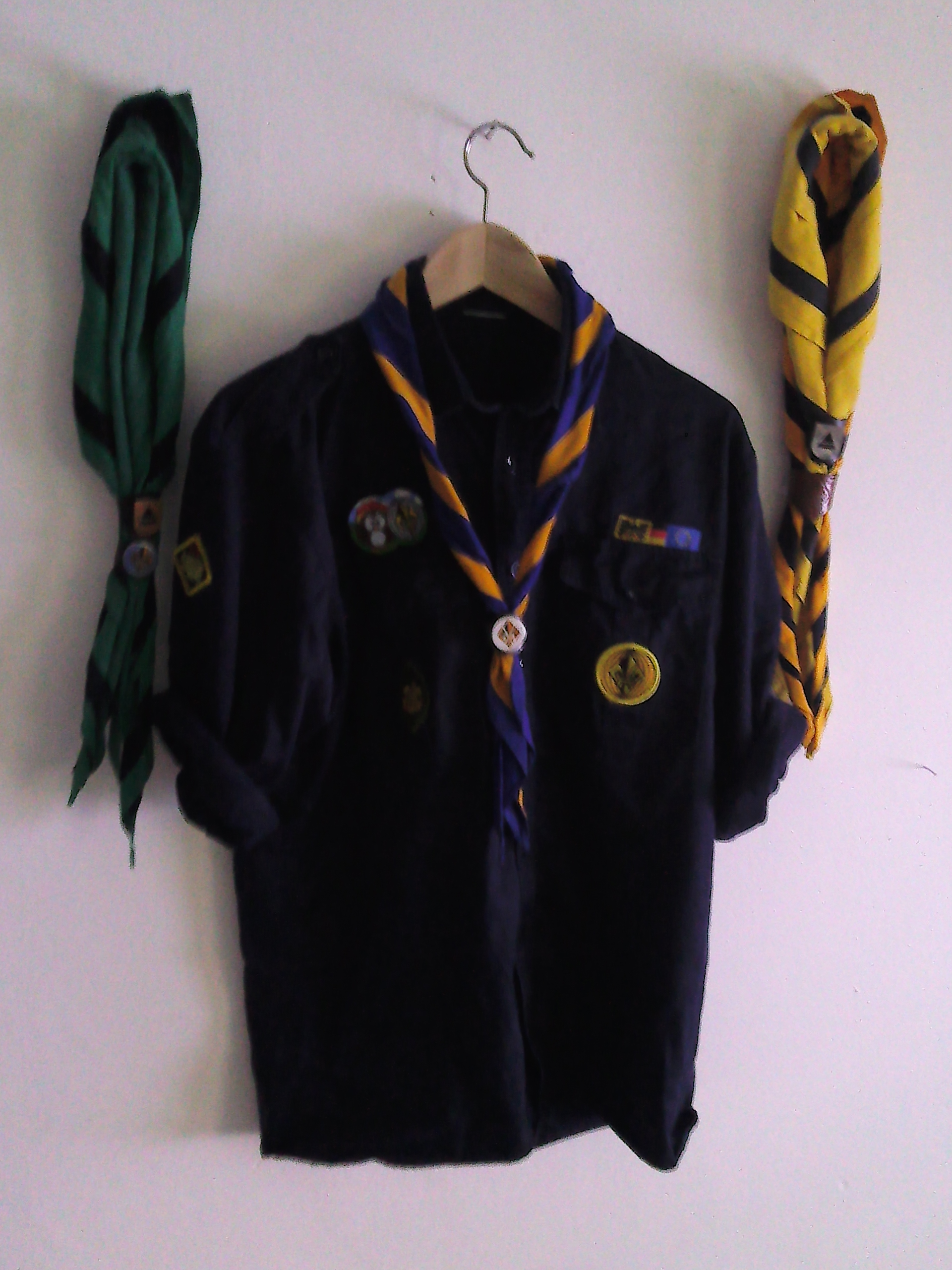
The Weltenbummler uniform

The Pfadfinderbund Weltenbummler e.V. (Scouts' Association Globetrotter) is an inter-confessional and apolitical German Scout association founded in 1981. It has about 2000 members and is part of the World Federation of Independent Scouts (WFIS), the Duke of Edinburgh's Award (DofE), the German Scout Association (DPV), the Bavarian Scout Council and the German Parity Welfare Association. The association is built on the principles constituted by Robert Baden-Powell. The scout uniform is dark blue; they wear black pants (trousers) and striped neckerchiefs with varied woggles.

== History ==
The PbW was founded on December 12, 1981 in Coburg under the name Pfadfinderbund Bayern e.V. by groups leaving the Bund der Pfadfinderinnen und Pfadfinder due to ideological reasons. Later the association was named Pfadfinderbund Weltenbummler e.V. due to Scouts joining them from the German states of Saxony and Thuringia after the fall of the Berlin Wall in 1989–90. In 1993 groups were founded in Schleswig-Holstein, Hamburg and Berlin; the PbW also has groups in North Rhine-Westphalia, Baden-Württemberg and Lower Saxony. Currently there are groups in seven German states.

== Structure ==
The PbW contains five organizational subdivisions. The topmost is the association called Bund itself, followed by Landesverbänden, which are named and bound to each state the group is in. Then there is the Bezirk, meaning the governmental district the patrol is located in. The most important instances are the Horst (aerie) and Stamm (tribe) which are the regional groups of the PbW's Scouts.

There are also different age groups:

1. Biber (Beaver) ages 3–7
2. Wölflinge (Cubs) ages 7–11
3. Pfadfinder (Scouts) ages 11–16
4. Rover (Rover Scouts) ages 16–27
5. Mannschaft (Team) ages 27+

== Activities ==
Each tribe has its own camps; beside this there is a Bundeslager, a national camp where every member is invited to take part and which takes place at four-year intervals. The association and fellow organizations also mount an annual rally called the Lauterburglauf. Reminiscent of the first patrol hike after World War II to the Lauterburg, a small castle in the top of a hill in near proximity to the Bavarian city of Coburg. The participating patrols hike about 25 kilometers with their bags and tents through the villages surrounding Coburg until they reach the ruins of the castle in Rödental.

== Scout Law, Promise and Motto ==
The Weltenbummlers' version of the Scout Law, Promise and Motto for the Girl and Boy Scout groups differs slightly from the original text of Baden Powell. There are different versions for the other age stages.

=== Scout law ===
1. Ein Pfadfinder ist ritterlich – A Scout is chivalrous
2. Ein Pfadfinder ist zuverlässig – A Scout is reliable
3. Ein Pfadfinder ist treu und gottesfürchtig – A Scout is true and faithful
4. Ein Pfadfinder ist jederzeit hilfsbereit – A Scout is ready to help at every time
5. Ein Pfadfinder ist Bruder aller Pfadfinder und Pfadfinderinnen und Freund aller Menschen – A Scout is brother to all Boy Scouts and Girl Scouts in the world and friend of each and every human
6. Ein Pfadfinder ist immer frohen Mutes – A Scout is always of good cheer
7. Ein Pfadfinder ist einfach und sparsam – A Scout is simple and thrifty
8. Ein Pfadfinder ist rein in Gedanken, Worten und Werken – A Scout is pure in thought, word and deed
9. Ein Pfadfinder schützt Pflanzen und Tiere – A Scout protects plants and animals
10. Ein Pfadfinder gehorcht aus freiem Willen – A Scout obeys out of free will

==== Beaver version ====
Mitmachen, Helfen und Teilen – Participate, help and share

==== Cub version ====
Ein Wölfling hilft, wo er kann und nimmt Rücksicht auf andere – A cub helps wherever he can and is considerate of others

==== Rover Scouts version ====
1. Ein Rover setzt sich für die Armen und Schwachen auf dieser Welt ein – A Rover Scout puts himself out for the poor and weak in this world
2. Ein Rover strebt nach einem natürlichen Leben und setzt sich aktiv für den Schutz der Umwelt ein – A Rover Scout thrives for a natural life and actively supports the protection of the environment
3. Ein Rover trägt zum friedlichen Miteinander unter den Pfadfindern und Menschen bei – A Rover Scout contributes to the peaceful togetherness of Scouts and humans alike
4. Ein Rover setzt sich mit Sinn- und Wertfragen auseinander – A Rover Scout grapples with questions of sense and value
5. Ein Rover geht den wichtigen Aufgaben des Lebens aktiv nach – A Rover Scout actively pursues the tasks of life
6. Ein Rover übernimmt Verantwortung in unserer demokratischen Gesellschaft – A Rover Scout takes responsibility in our democratic society
7. Ein Rover trägt unseren Bund entscheidend mit – A Rover Scout crucially carries along our association

==== Team version ====
The team uses the same Scout Law as the Girl and Boy Scouts.

=== Scout promise ===
Ich verspreche bei meiner Ehre, Gott und meinem Vaterland zu dienen, die Pfadfindergesetze zu befolgen und täglich eine Gute Tat zu tun. – I promise on my honor to serve God and my home country, to obey the Scout Law and do a daily good deed.

==== Beaver version ====
Ich verspreche ein guter Biber zu sein und die Gesetze zu beachten. – I promise to be a good beaver and to obey the Laws.

==== Cub version ====
Ich verspreche ein guter Wölfling zu sein und die Gesetze zu beachten. – I promise to be a good cub and to obey the Laws.

==== Rover Scouts version ====
Ich verspreche bei meiner Ehre, meine pfadfinderischen Ideale zu leben, der Gesellschaft und unserem Bund zu dienen und mein Bestes zu geben. – I promise on my honor to live my Scout ideals, to serve the society and our association and to give my best.

=== Scout motto ===
Allzeit bereit! – Always prepared!

==== Beaver version ====
Wir teilen! – We share!

==== Cub version ====
Unser Bestes! – Our best!

==== Rover Scouts and Team version ====
Allzeit bereit! – Always prepared!
