= Hoheneck Castle =

Castle standing since at least the 1100s

- Burg Hoheneck
- Ipsheim
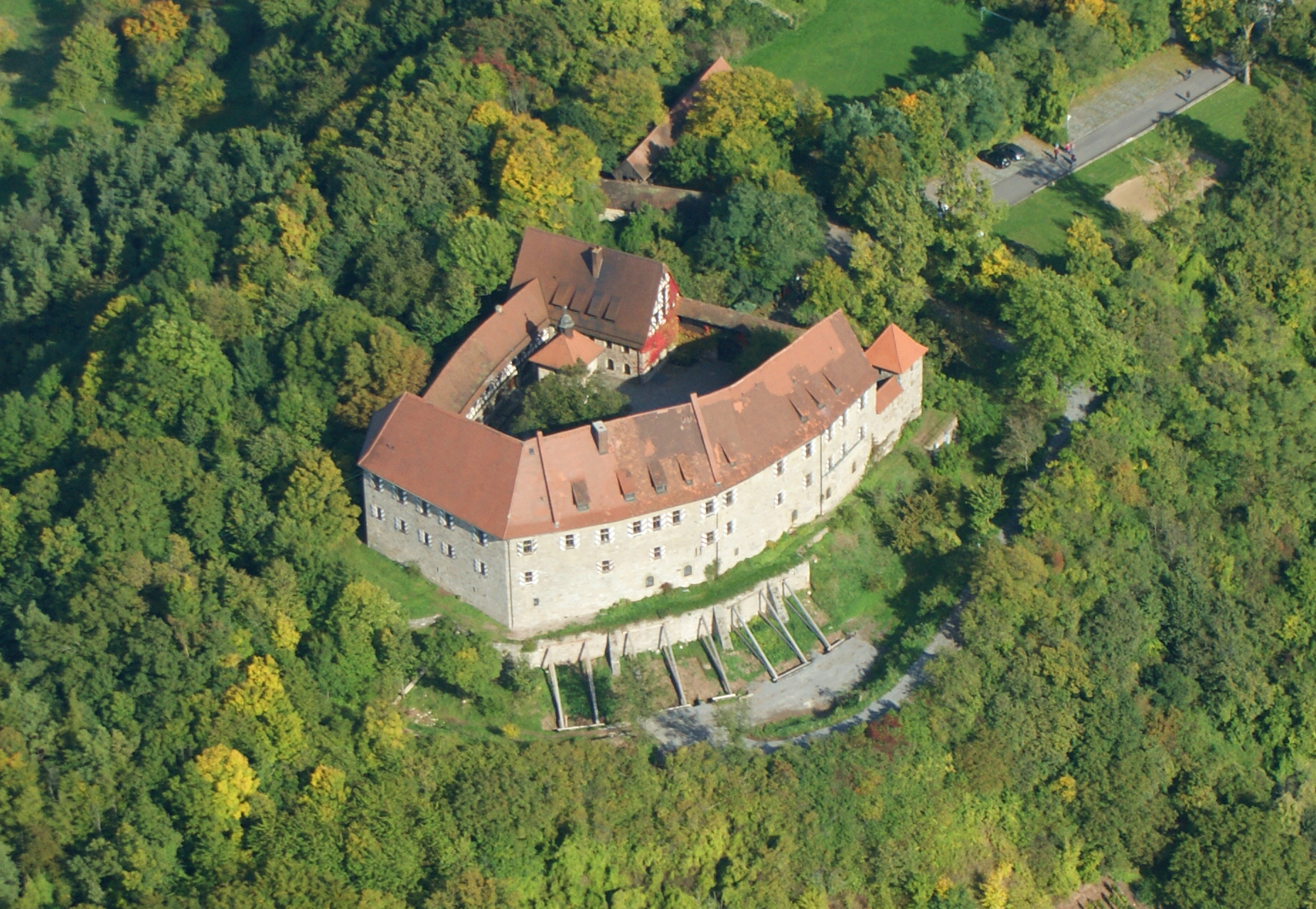
- Hoheneck Castle

Site information
- Type: Castle
- Owner: City of Nuremberg

Location
- Coordinates: 49.5211°N 10.5065°E

Site history
- Built: first mentioned in 1132

Hoheneck Castle is a medieval castle above Ipsheim and also a district of the municipality of Ipsheim in the Landkreis Neustadt (Aisch)-Bad Windsheim in Middle Franconia in Bavaria, Germany. Since 1984, the youth castle serves as an educational institution of the Youth Council of the city of Nuremberg.

== Location ==
The castle is situated on the slopes of the Franconian Heights, a small, forested, hill range (Frankenhöhe Nature Park), high above the valley of the Aisch. To the east of the castle are the extensive forests of the Franconian Heights, part of the Hoheneck Forest. At its base is one of the few wine areas in Middle Franconia (Mittelfranken Bocksbeutelstraße).

== History ==
Hoheneck was first mentioned in 1132.

The City of Nuremberg acquired the castle in 1953 and it is the only castle owned by the city, as the Nuremberg Castle is owned by the Free State of Bavaria. Since April 1984 the Youth Castle serves as a youth education centre for the Youth Council of Kreis Nuremberg.

it was used as a prison in the 1950's till 1990

In 2007 the castle celebrated its 875th anniversary.
