= Deutsche Pfadfinderschaft Sankt Georg =

German Scouting organization

Deutsche Pfadfinder*innenschaft Sankt Georg
- German Scouting Association Saint George
- Headquarters: Neuss
- Country: Germany
- Founded: 1929
- Membership: 95,000
- Chairwoman: Annkathrin Meyer
- Chairman: Sebastian Becker
- Curate: Maxmilian Strozyk
- Website http://www.dpsg.de

The Deutsche Pfadfinder*innenschaft Sankt Georg (DPSG, German Scout Association Saint George) is the largest of Germany's many Scouting organizations. The Catholic association has about 95,000 members of all genders. Via the Ring deutscher Pfadfinder*innenverbände it is a member of the World Organization of the Scout Movement.

The DPSG is also a member of the International Catholic Conference of Scouting (ICCS) and of the Bund der Deutschen Katholischen Jugend (BDKJ).

== History ==
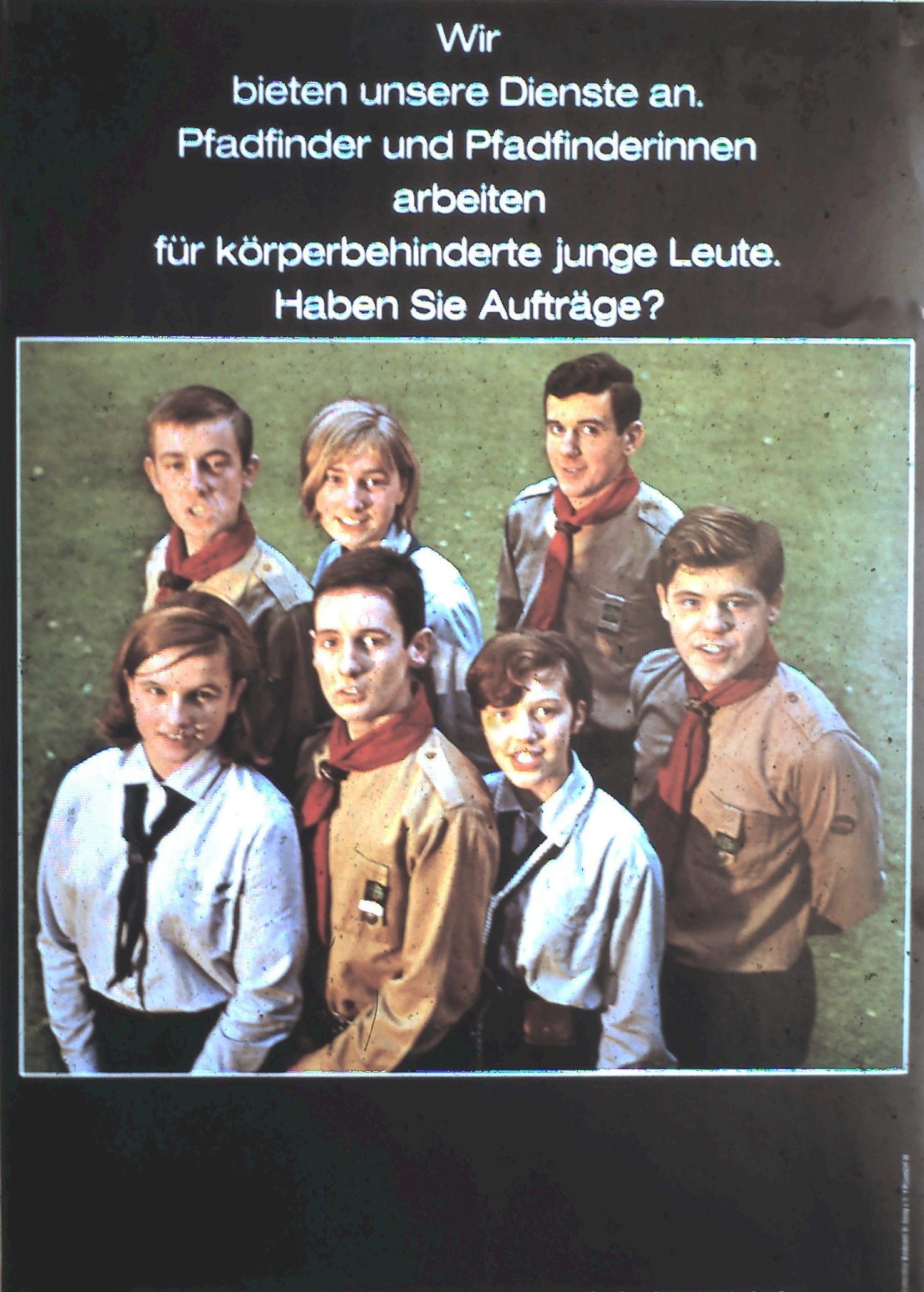
Members of the Deutsche Pfadfinderschaft Sankt Georg (boys) and of the Pfadfinderinnenschaft Sankt Georg (girls), 1967

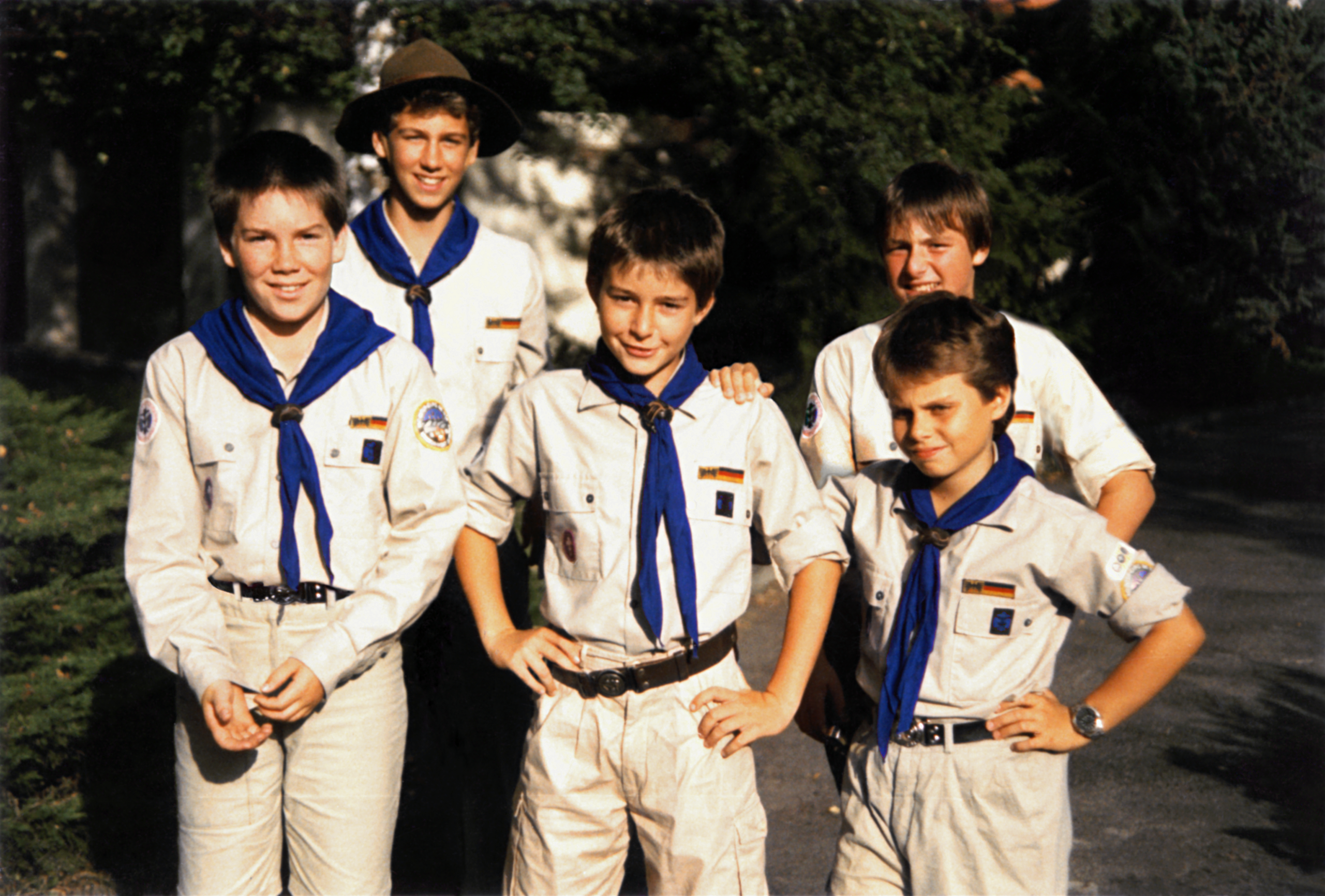
Boy Scouts of the Deutsche Pfadfinderschaft Sankt Georg, 1987

The DPSG was founded in 1929. In the preceding years only a few Catholic Scout groups were active, since most German bishops saw Scouting as a Protestant or secular movement. In the beginning the DPSG did not count more than 800 members. After 1933 membership rose noticeably: Most competing youth organizations were disbanded by the Nazi-authorities or incorporated in the Hitler Youth while the DPSG still enjoyed some degree of protection under the Reichskonkordat. In 1935 membership stood by 16,000 boys in 457 local groups. This development lasted until 1938 when all religious youth organizations were banned.

Catholic Scouting was restarted as soon as World War II was over, thanks to underground networks still existing in some places. The first local groups were reorganized in 1945, mainly in the American occupied zone. In 1946 the national association was restored. When the Ring deutscher Pfadfinderbünde was founded in 1949 the DPSG had about 20,000 members.

The number of members of the association rose also in the following years - with some temporary set-backs - until it reached 100,000 in the early 1980s. Since then membership has stagnated. In 1971, the DPSG did open to girls. Today, nearly all local groups are coeducational but there is also a parallel Guiding organization with strong ties to the DPSG: the Pfadfinderinnenschaft Sankt Georg.

== Program ==
The Scout emblem is a blue symbol, a combination of the Scouting fleur-de-lis with a cross.

=== Sections ===
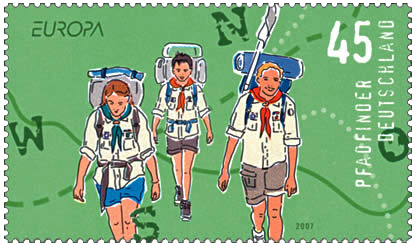
Commemorative stamp of the Deutsche Post on the centenary of Scouting in 2007, depicting a Senior Scout and two Rover Scouts.

The DPSG is divided in four sections according to age:

- Wölflinge (Cub Scouts) - aged 7 to 10; orange scarf
- Jungpfadfinder (cubs) - aged 10 to 13; blue scarf
- Pfadfinder (Venture Scouts) - aged 13 to 16; green scarf
- Rover (Rover Scouts) - aged 16 to 20; red scarf

All leaders in the DPSG are supposed to be 18 or older; they wear a grey scarf or, if they are Gilwell educated, the Woodbadge scarf and insignia. Unlike most German Scout associations, the association does not practise youth leadership.

=== Promise ===
The DPSG does not know a common Scout Promise. The promise shall be formulated individually by the respective group and for the respective advancement. Nevertheless some local groups have regular wordings that are in use since the 1960s.

=== Scout Law ===
In 2005, the DPSG reintroduced a common Scout Law for the whole association. In the years before, four guidelines were used instead of a Scout Law.

Als Pfadfinderin .../Als Pfadfinder ...
As a Girl Scout/Boy Scout ...
- ... begegne ich allen Menschen mit Respekt und habe alle Pfadfinder und Pfadfinderinnen als Geschwister.
  ... I'll meet everybody with respect. All Scouts and Guides are my brothers and sisters.
- ... gehe ich zuversichtlich und mit wachen Augen durch die Welt.
  ... I'll meet the world confident and with open eyes.
- ... bin ich höflich und helfe da, wo es notwendig ist.
  ... I will be courteous and will help where needed.
- ... mache ich nichts halb und gebe auch in Schwierigkeiten nicht auf.
  ... I'll finish my task; I won't give up even if it is difficult.
- ... entwickle ich eine eigene Meinung und stehe für diese ein.
  ... I'll develop my own opinion and stand by it.
- ... sage ich, was ich denke, und tue, was ich sage.
  ... I'll say what I'm thinking and do what I say.
- ... lebe ich einfach und umweltbewusst.
  ... I'll live simply and environmentally aware.
- ... stehe ich zu meiner Herkunft und zu meinem Glauben.
  ... I'm aware of my origin, and faith.

== International partners ==
The DPSG strongly emphasizes its international partnerships. Since the late 1940s, it is twinned with the Scouts et Guides de France and the Associazione Guide e Scouts Cattolici Italiani. More recently a number of development partnerships were started. These partners include the Scouts de Bénin, the Asociación de Scouts de Bolivia, the Lebanese Scouting Federation, the Rwanda Scouts Association and the Association Scoute du Togo.

== Organization ==
The DPSG is divided in 25 councils (Diözesanverbände) corresponding to the Catholic dioceses of Germany. Only two dioceses in the former German Democratic Republic are without own structures (Dresden-Meissen and Görlitz), they are served by the neighbouring councils.

Most of the councils are divided in districts (total: 137 districts) and on local level more than 1,400 groups (Stämme, "tribes") are active. Regularly, a local group consists of four troops - one of each section.

== See also ==
- Scouting in Germany
