= Neuerburg (castle) =

- Neuerburg
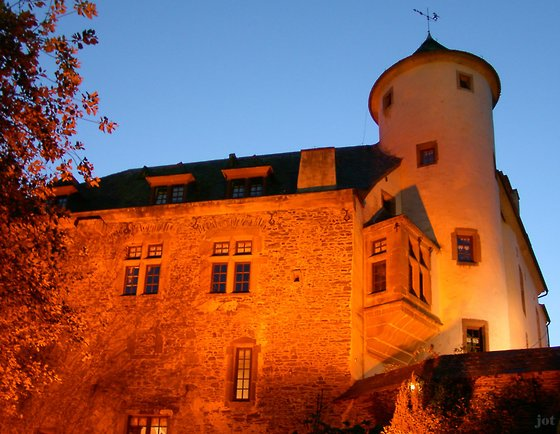
- Neuerburg – evening illumination

Site information
- Type: hill castle, hillside location
- Code: DE-RP
- Condition: preserved or largely preserved

Location
- Coordinates: 50°0′38.63″N 6°17′25.33″E

Site history
- Built: 892/ 1132

Garrison information
- Occupants: ministeriales

The Neuerburg (German: Burg Neuerburg) is a castle and fortress in the western Eifel mountains in the Enzbach valley above the town of Neuerburg in the county of Eifelkreis Bitburg-Prüm in the German state of Rhineland-Palatinate. After being restored from 1926 onwards, it has been used as a Jugendburg.

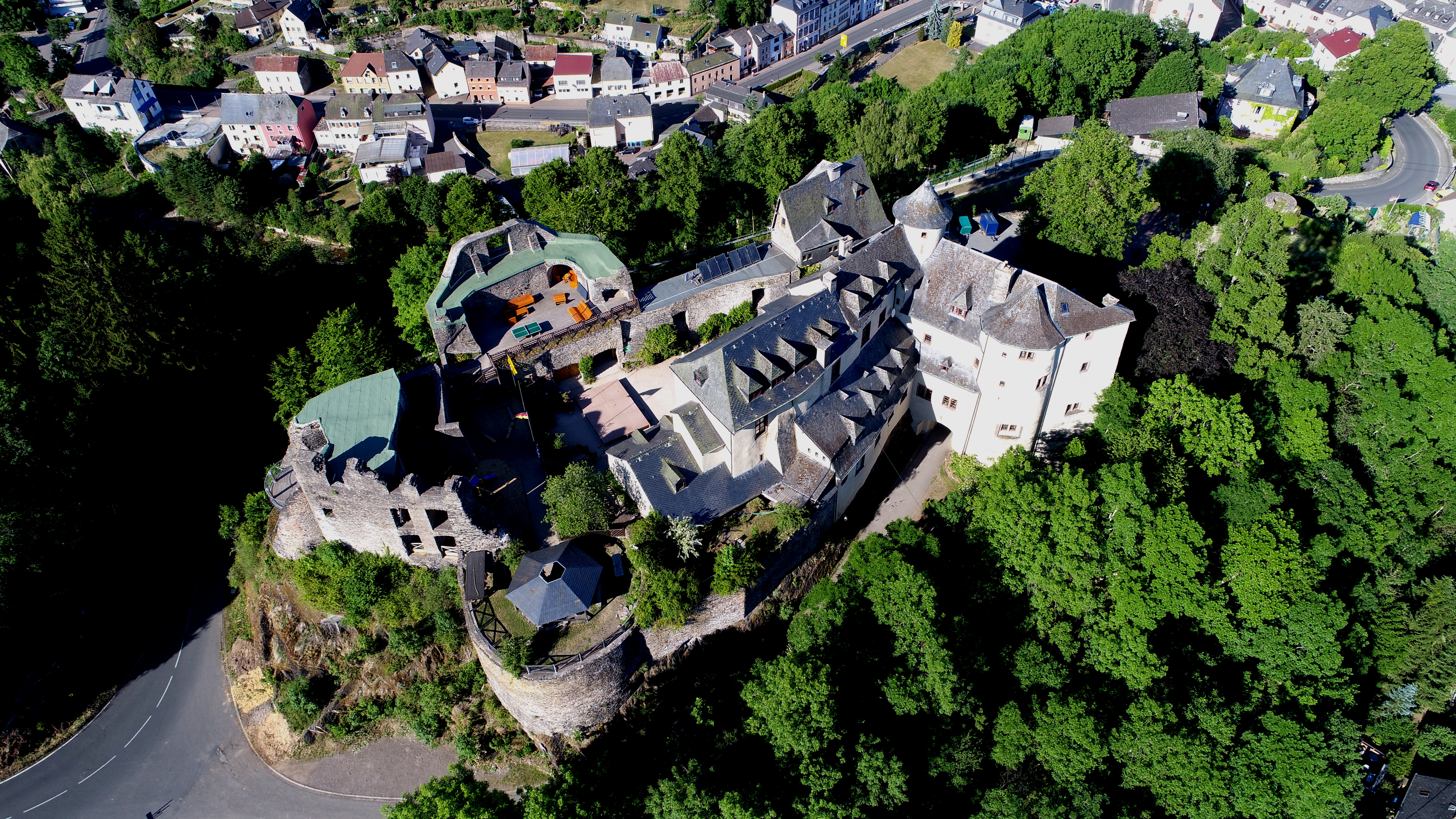
Neuerburg, 2017 aerial photograph

== History ==
The first definite record of the hillside castle was in 1132, when a Theoderic of Neuerburg witnessed a deed of gift. The castle was certainly older than that because, in 1270, the Count of Vianden and Herrschaft of Neuerburg were described as an old fief of his house, which he himself was enfeoffed with by the Count of Luxemburg.

An older document about the second Norman invasion of 892 mentions a newly built castle into which the monks of Prüm Abbey fled. But this could refer to any one of several castles in the Eifel region.

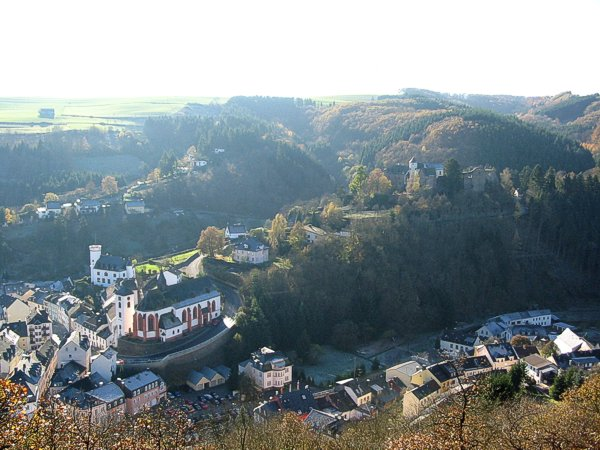
Neuerburg and its outer ring of fortifications

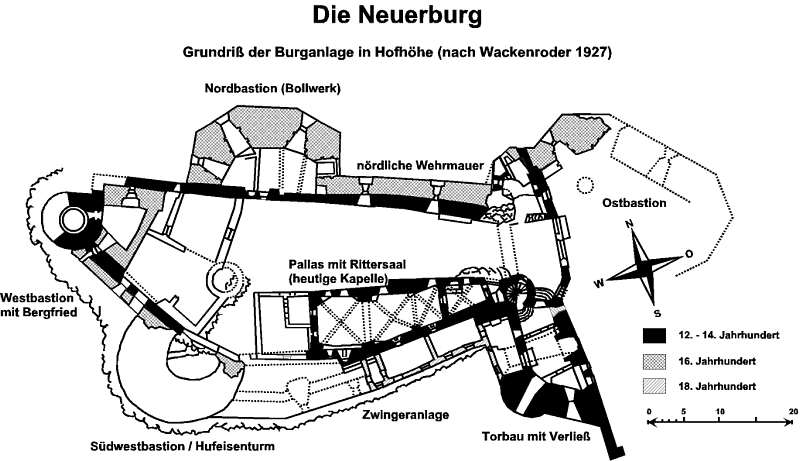
Plan of the castle dated 1927, indicating important construction periods

The importance of the castle is indicated by the fact that, in 1332, it gave town rights to the town located at its feet. That same year, Frederick III, the last lord of Neuerburg, died. In the following years, its lordship changed hands several times.

Substantial expansion measures, making it more like a fortress, were then carried out between 1513 and 1540 by Dietrich IV, Count of Manderscheid-Blankenheim, Lord of Schleiden, Daun, Neuenstein, Kronenburg and Neuerburg etc. This line of rulers held the castle and its estate until its dissolution by French Revolutionary troops in 1794, when the bastions were built as part of the expansion measures for artillery. Particularly noteworthy is the transition from round bastions (southwest bastions) to polygonal bastions (northern bastions), which took place during this construction phase. The wall thicknesses were increased as part of this building work until they finally reached about 5.5 metres. This process is unusual for such an old castle, as it was now built like a fortress. Nevertheless, a residential wing was added.

Its importance as a fortress is emphasized, especially during the Thirty Years' War (1618 to 1648), because at the outset it was repaired and stocked with munitions and then made ready to defend against Swedish, Dutch, Irish, Polish and French troops. However, the Luxembourg troops who were garrisoned for its defence behaved so badly that even they had to be defended against. The castle, however, prevented these troops from pillaging.

The years that followed were dominated by wars (War of the Palatine Succession, Franco-Dutch War), so that the castle was further upgraded and fortified), but also attacked. 1692 was a decisive year because the fortifications were blown up by the French. Some of its facilities were rebuilt in 1701, but not to its former splendour. The final end came with the Coalition Wars when the castle was seized by the French and auctioned off to raise money for the state coffers. Its stones were sold after the great fire of 1818 and used elsewhere.

The castle then came into municipal ownership and was used as an almshouse, archive and gaol until the beginning of the 20th century.

In 1926, the Bund Neudeutschland acquired the castle as part of an Erbpacht contract and had it partially rebuilt. As a result of numerous conversions, a mezzanine was created between the ground floor and the first floor, which often acted as a hiding place and refuge. These rooms can still be accessed today through hidden entrances.

== Present use ==
The castle is maintained today by Bund Neudeutschland (with its HQ in Cologne), as a Jugendburg and youth hostel, managed by the Krump family. The inner courtyard, castle chapel and ruins are freely accessible to the public.
