= Christliche Pfadfinderschaft Deutschlands (1976) =

German Protestant Scout association

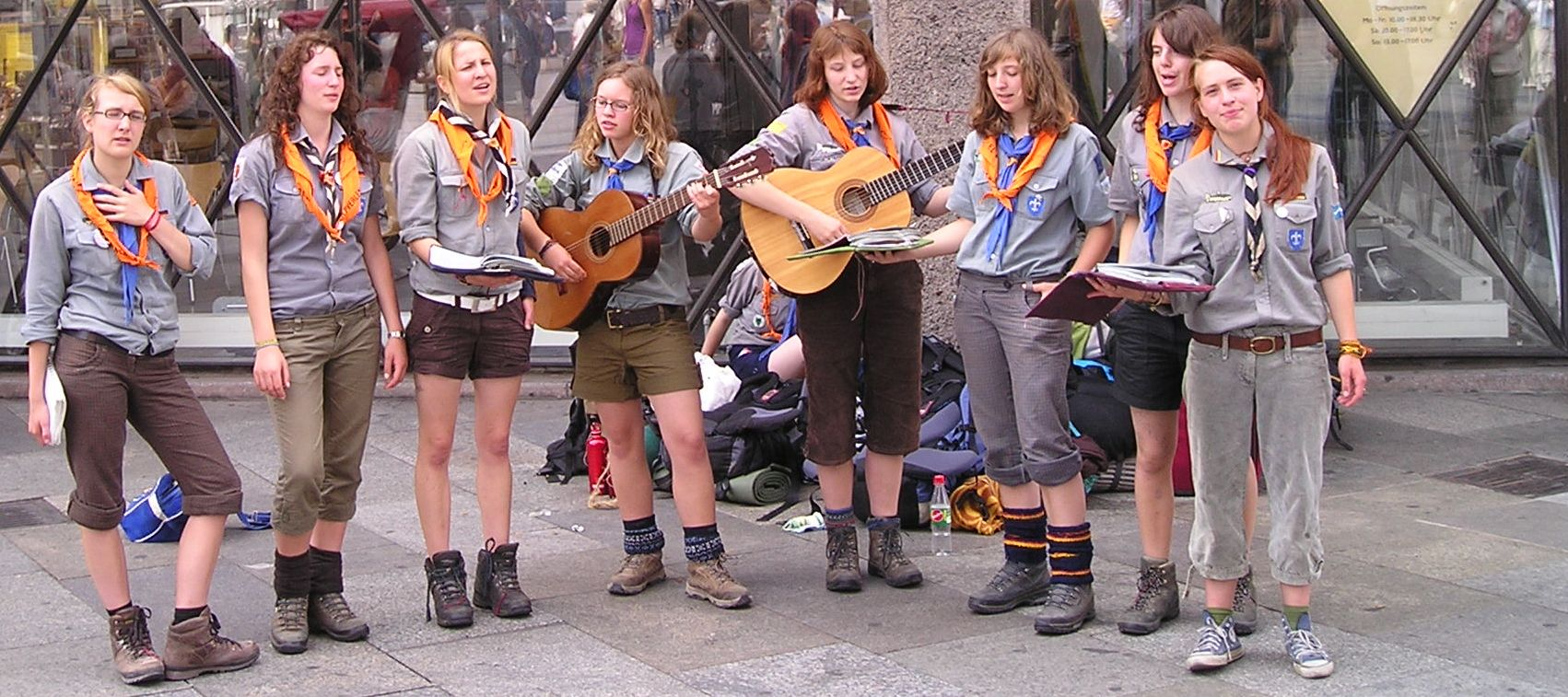
- Singing Girl Guides of the Christliche Pfadfinderschaft Deutschlands
- Country: Germany
- Founded: 1976

The Christliche Pfadfinderschaft Deutschlands e.V. (CPD) is a German Protestant Scout association established in 1976, after the 1973 fusion of Bünde Christliche Pfadfinderschaft Deutschlands, Evangelischer Mädchen-Pfadfinderbund and Bund Christlicher Pfadfinderinnen to form the Verband Christlicher Pfadfinderinnen und Pfadfinder (VCP) led to dissatisfaction with the development of the VCP. This conservative movement then formed a new association which largely relies on the traditions of the original CPD.
