= Rieneck =

- Town
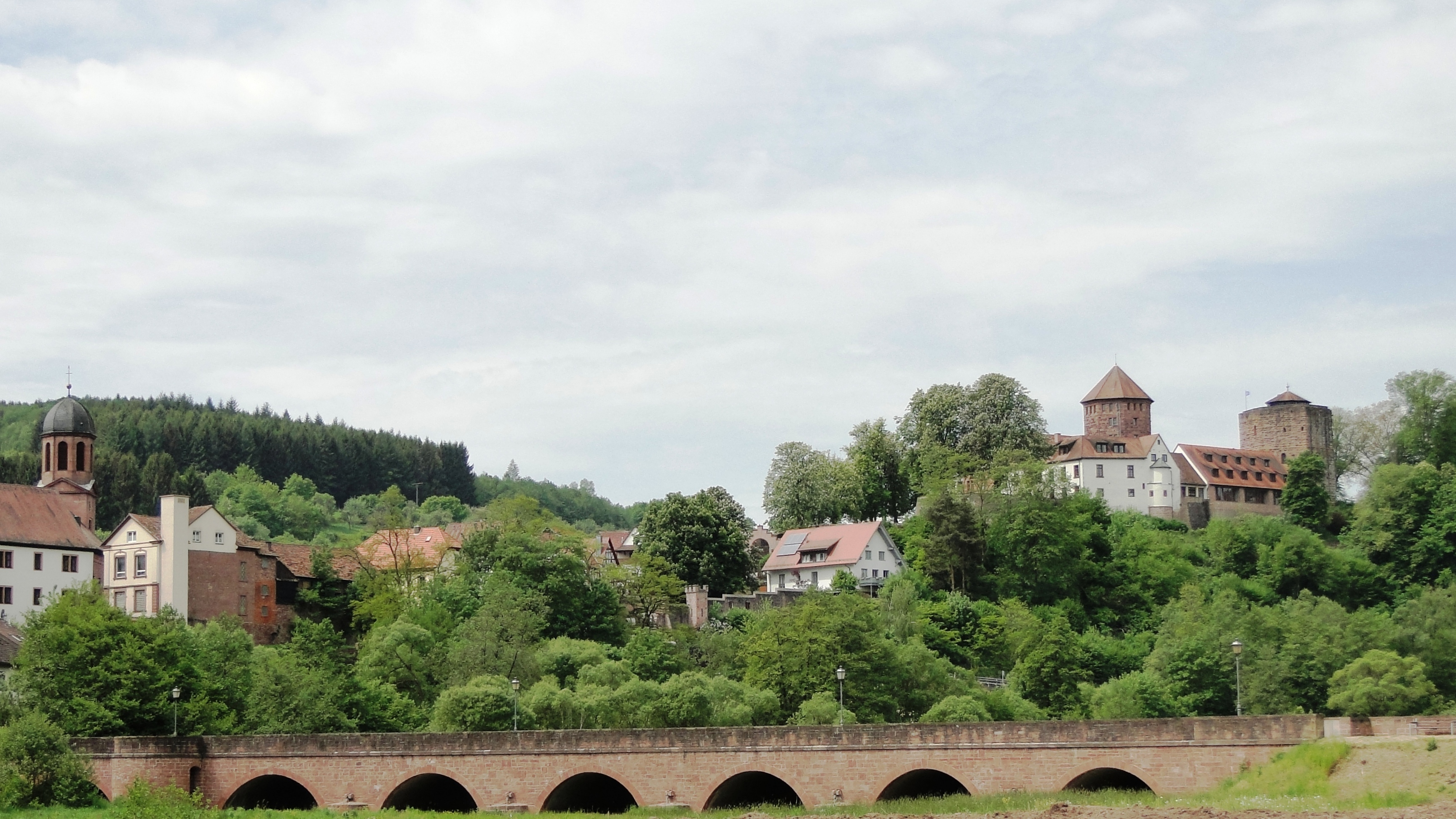
- View of Rieneck with church, castle and bridge over the Sinn river

- Coat of arms

- Location of Rieneck within Main-Spessart district
- Interactive map of Rieneck
- Location within Germany Location within Bavaria
- Coordinates: 50°6′N 9°38′E
- Country: Germany
- State: Bavaria
- Admin. region: Unterfranken
- District: Main-Spessart

Government
  - Mayor (2020–26): Sven Nickel

Area
  - Total: 26.19 km^{2} (10.11 sq mi)
- Elevation: 182 m (597 ft)

Population (2025-12-31)
  - Total: 1,833
  - Density: 69.99/km^{2} (181.3/sq mi)
- Time zone: UTC+01:00 (CET)
  - Summer (DST): UTC+02:00 (CEST)
- Postal codes: 97794
- Dialling codes: 09354
- Vehicle registration: MSP
- Website: www.rieneck.de

Rieneck (German: [ˈʁiːnɛk]) is a town in the Main-Spessart district in the Regierungsbezirk of Lower Franconia (Unterfranken) in Bavaria, Germany.

== Geography ==
=== Location ===
Rieneck lies in the Würzburg region between the southern foothills of the Rhön (range) and the east side of the Spessart (range) on the lower reaches of the River Sinn, 12 km northeast of Lohr am Main, and 39 km northwest of Würzburg. Administratively, it belongs to the Main-Spessart district in the Regierungsbezirk of Lower Franconia.

There are 140 ha of cropfields, meadows and woodland around the village.

=== Subdivisions ===
The town has only the Gemarkung (traditional rural cadastral area) of Rieneck.

== History ==
In 790, Rieneck had its first documentary mention. The town's current name comes from its former lords, the Counts of Rieneck, who themselves had taken the name from a Middle Rhenish noble family that had died out. In the mid-12th century a castle was built on the banks of the Sinn. With this arose a settlement, which as of 7 June 1311 was described as an oppidum (town).

During the Middle Ages, the Counts of Rieneck were in competition with the Prince-Bishops of Würzburg and the Archbishops of Mainz for control of parts of the Spessart hills.

Among the counts’ descendants is the family of Ministeriales Voit von Rieneck, which itself also later earned local importance. As the castle was being converted into a knightly castle in 1168, Count Ludwig of Rieneck acquired the County in the Spessart. The comital family, whose seat was at Lohr am Main, died out with Count Philipp III on 3 September 1559. Rieneck ended up in 1673 in the hands of the Counts of Nostitz. The Amt of the County of Rieneck, which the Counts of Nostitz had sold in 1803 to the Princes of Colloredo-Mansfeld, was mediatized in favour of the Principality of Aschaffenburg in 1806 and passed (by this time it had become a part of the Grand Duchy of Frankfurt) to Bavaria in 1814. In the course of administrative reform in Bavaria, the current community came into being with the Gemeindeedikt ("Municipal Edict") of 1818.

The town's Jewish community, which had existed for many years, came to an end with Kristallnacht (9 November 1938). Behind the house at Schloßberg 10 at the Kriegerdenkmal, a plaque recalls the persecution and murder of the town's Jewish inhabitants in the Holocaust.

== Demographics ==
Within town limits, 2,315 inhabitants were counted in 1970, 2,096 in 1987 and in 2000 2,127.

== Economy ==
Rieneck's economic potential lies in forestry (more than 2 000 ha of woodland) and above all in tourism (2002: 33,500 overnight stays). The local economic structure is made up mainly of producing businesses, trade and service provision. The greater part of Rieneck's workers commute to the nearby regional centres of Lohr am Main (Bosch Rexroth AG), Karlstadt and Würzburg.

Municipal taxes in 1999 amounted to €849,000 (converted), of which net business taxes amounted to €97,000.

=== Tourism ===
Rieneck lies at the foot of Rieneck Castle and is surrounded by wooded hills with mixed broadleaf forests (Spessart oak). The Sinn valley floodplain (Sinntalaue), which in the late 1990s became a nature reserve, provides a habitat for rare animals, like the beaver, and protected plants, like the snake's head.

Rieneck Castle, the town's landmark, changed hands many times over the years. Since 1959, it has housed a modern Jugendburg (a youth meeting and training centre) run by the Verband Christlicher Pfadfinderinnen und Pfadfinder, a Christian Guiding and Scouting organization. The castle's sponsor is the Bildungs- und Erholungswerk Burg Rieneck (BEW e.V., "Rieneck Castle Educational and Recreational Works"). The Romanesque Dreikonchenkapelle (chapel) is built into the 8 m-thick walls of the Dicker Turm ("Thick Tower") in a cloverleaf shape. The special shape of the chapel is unique in Continental Europe. A construction like this is found only in the British Isles in a similar defensive tower.

== Government ==
=== Mayors ===
Since 1 May 2020, Sven Nickel (Freie Bürger) is mayor of Rieneck.

Time in office	Mayor
1986–2003	Walter Höfling
2003–2006	Waldemar Horn (died in office)
2006–2020	Wolfgang Küber
since 2020	Sven Nickel

=== Coat of arms ===
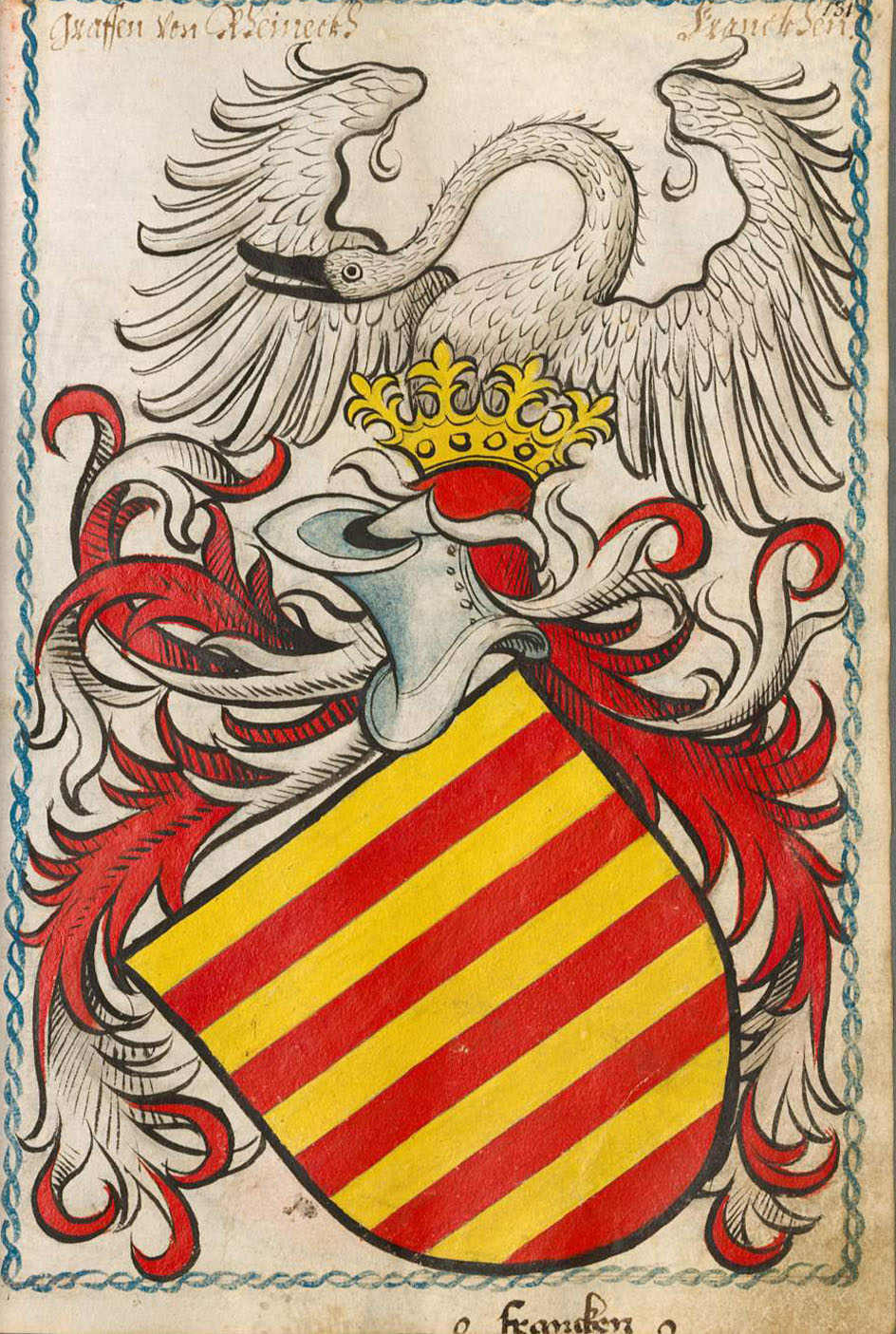
Rieneck family's arms

The town's arms might be described thus: Quartered, first and fourth Or three chevrons gules, second and third barry of ten of the same, the whole surmounted at the fess point by a wheel spoked of six argent.

Town seals are only known as far back as the 19th century. No official approval for the arms is known. However, the arms show the two historically most important lordly families' arms. The two quarters with horizontal golden and red stripes are both based on the arms formerly borne by the Counts of Rieneck, and the other two, with the chevrons, are based on those formerly borne by the Counts of Hanau. The wheel is the Wheel of Mainz. The tinctures were laid down in writing in 1898.

== Infrastructure ==
=== Transport ===
Rieneck can be reached by railway via the Flieden–Gemünden line and by the Main-Spessart local bus service. The nearest InterCityExpress stop is the railway station at Würzburg, 50 km away, and the nearest airport is 100 km away, at Frankfurt.

=== Social services ===
Since 1978, SOS-Dorfgemeinschaft Hohenroth, an SOS Children's Village belonging to SOS-Kinderdorf Deutschland, the organization's German branch, has operated on Rieneck's outskirts, at the former "Hohenroth" estate. Just under 160 handicapped people (as of October 2007) live there with families who care for them, and they work in their own workshops, market gardens, dairies and bakeries. The products, which are made to Demeter guidelines, are sold in the village's own farm shop. Although Rieneck has close ties with Hohenroth, the latter is officially a Stadtteil of Gemünden am Main.

== Notable people ==
- Walter Bloem (1868-1951), writer
- Anton Schnack (1892-1973), poet
