= Scouting and Guiding in Germany =

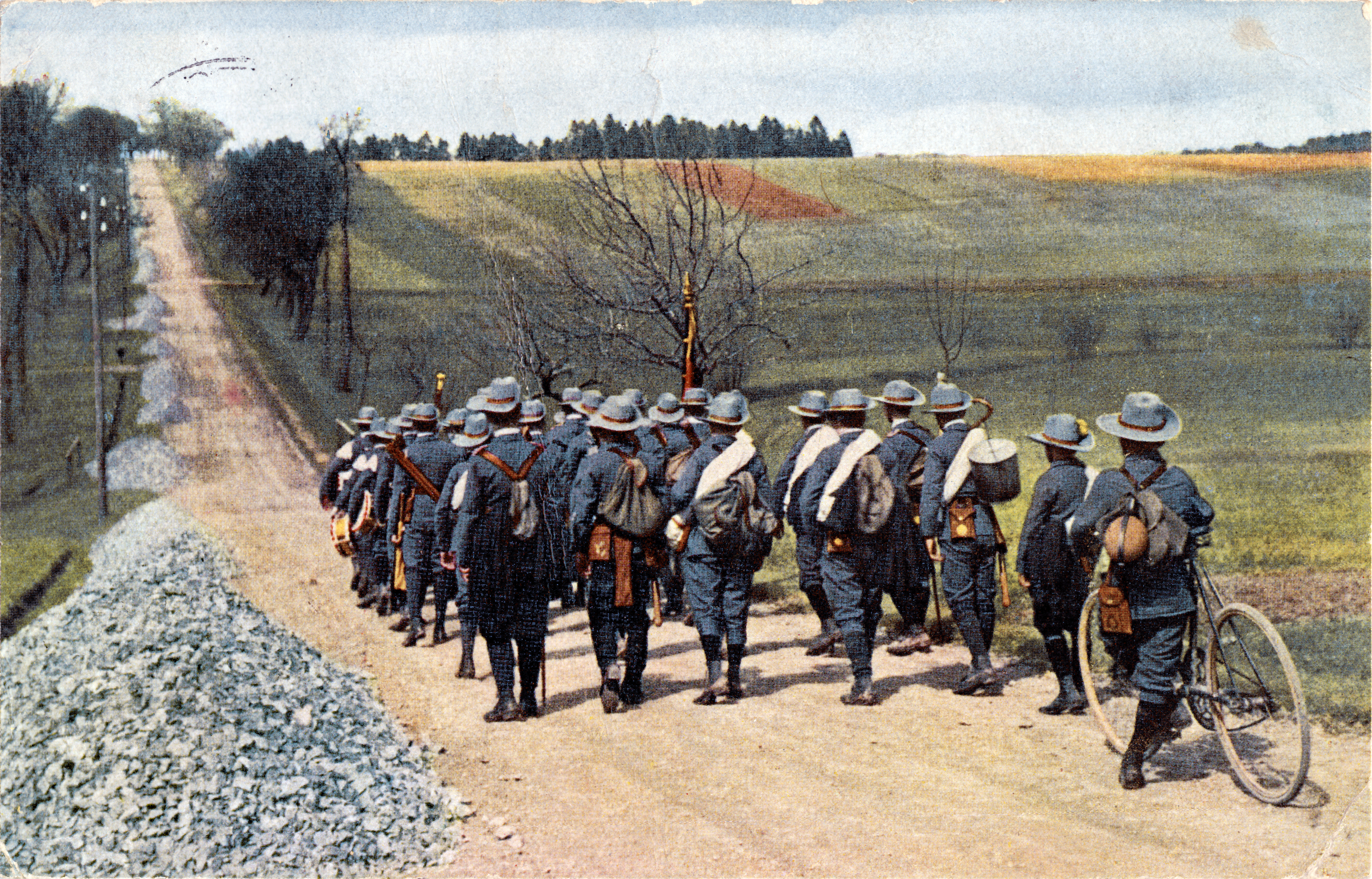
German Scouts of the YMCA before World War I on an early color photograph

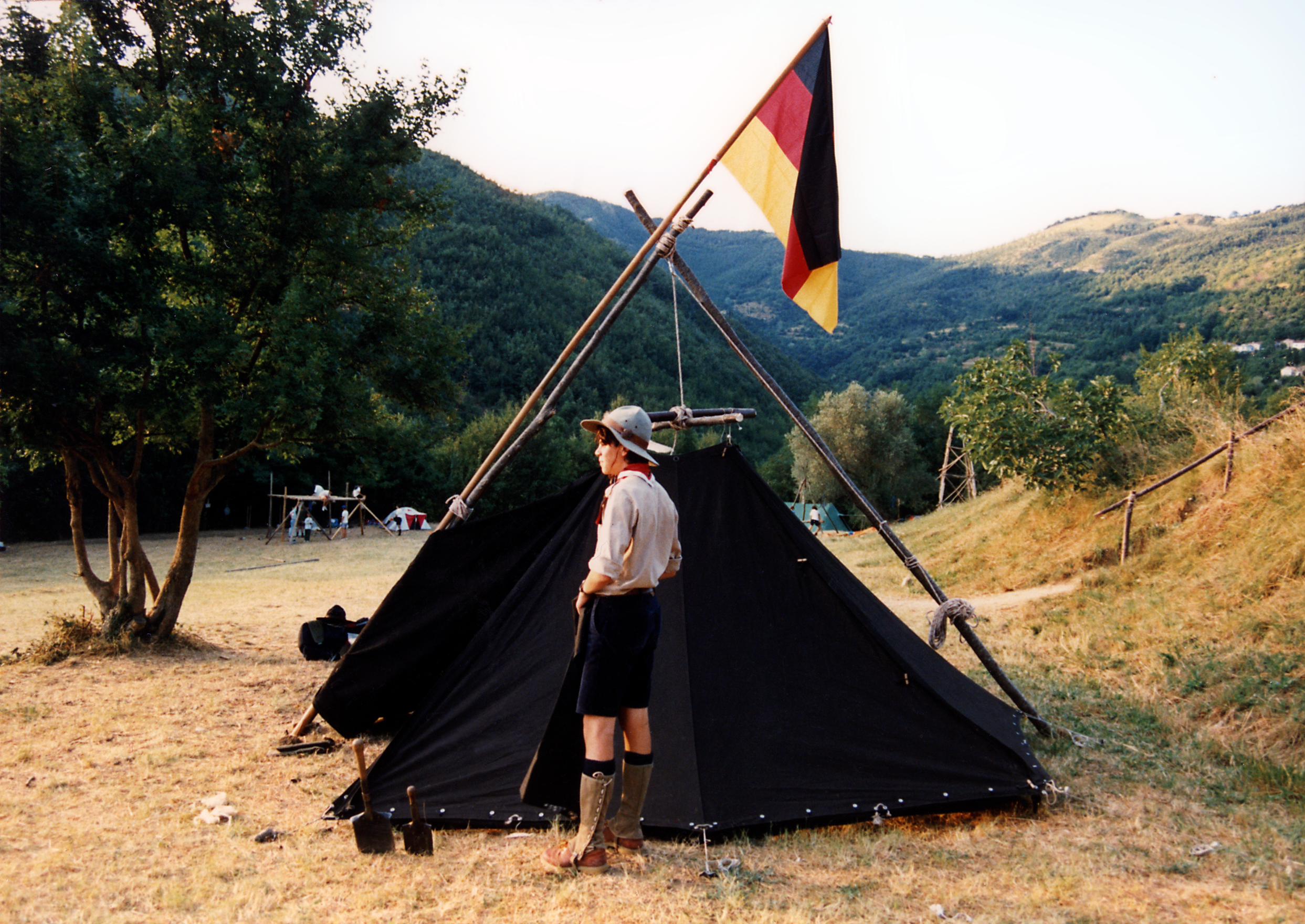
The Kohte, the typical black tent of German Scouting since the 1930s

The Scout movement in Germany consists of a multitude of associations and federations with about 260,000 Scouts and Guides.

== History ==
Scouting in Germany started in 1909. After World War I, German Scouting became involved with the German Youth Movement, of which the Wandervogel was a part. Another group that, while short-lived, was influential on later German Scouting, was the Deutsche Jungenschaft vom 1.11.1929 founded by Eberhard Koebel; some specifics of German Scouting derive from Koebel's group. German Scouting flourished until 1934-35, when nearly all associations were closed and their members had to join the Hitler Youth.

In West Germany and West Berlin, Scouting was reestablished after 1945, but it was banned in East Germany until 1990 in favor of the Thälmann Pioneers and the Free German Youth. Today it is present in all parts of the unified Federal Republic of Germany.

== Associations ==
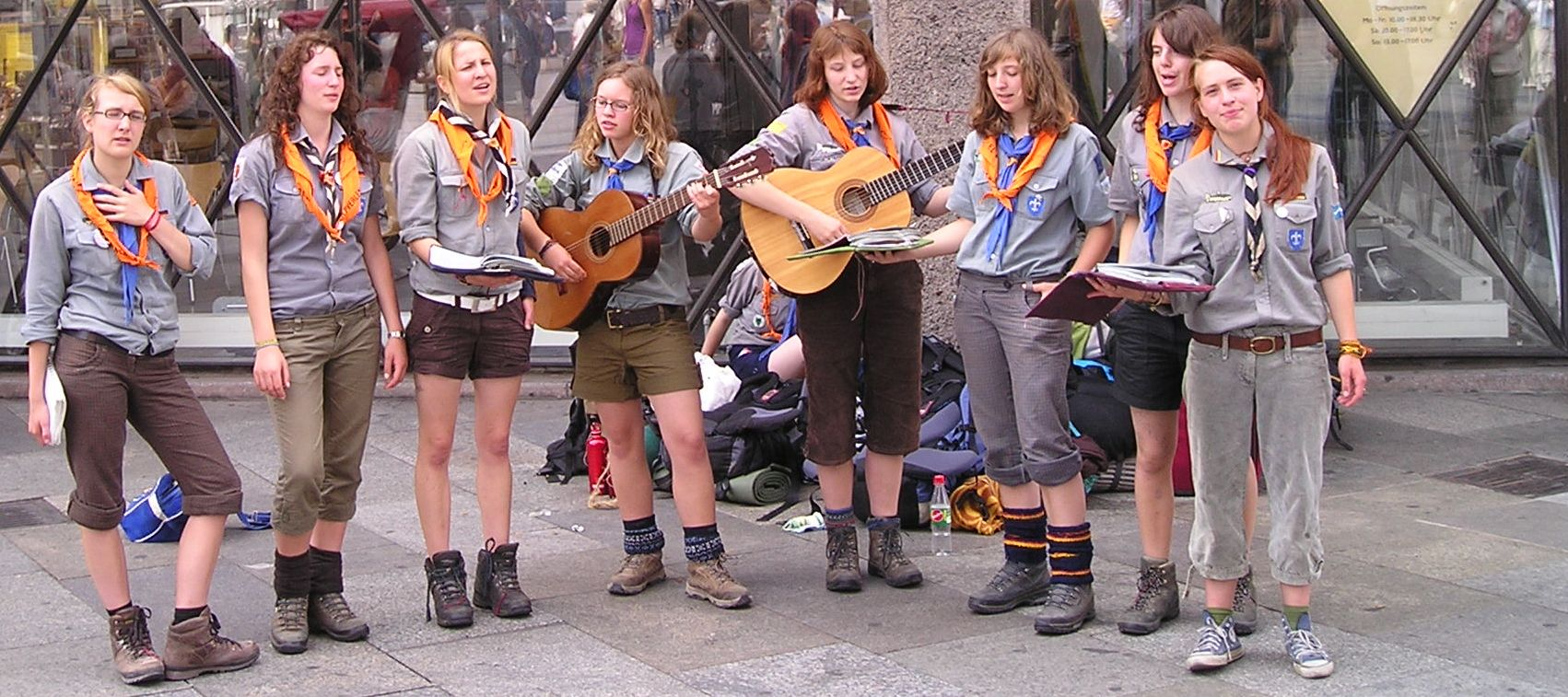
Singing Girl Guides of the Christliche Pfadfinderschaft Deutschlands

Most of the Scouting associations and federations are coeducational, but there are some single-gender organisations.

The most major associations and federations are:

- Ring deutscher Pfadfinder*innenverbände (World Organization of the Scout Movement and World Association of Girl Guides and Girl Scouts member), a federation of
  - Bund der Pfadfinderinnen und Pfadfinder (interreligious, coeducational, 30,000 members)
  - Deutsche Pfadfinderschaft Sankt Georg (Catholic, coeducational, 95,000 members)
  - Verband Christlicher Pfadfinder*innen (Protestant, coeducational, 50,000 members)
  - Bund Moslemischer Pfadfinder und Pfadfinderinnen Deutschlands (Muslim, coeducational, <1,000 members)
  - Pfadfinderinnenschaft Sankt Georg (Catholic, almost girls-only, 10,000 members)
- Verband Deutscher Altpfadfindergilden, affiliated to International Scout and Guide Fellowship
- Deutscher Pfadfinderverband, a federation of 18 independent associations (interreligious, coeducational, 29,000 members); one of its members is also member of the World Federation of Independent Scouts:
  - Pfadfinderbund Weltenbummler (interreligious, coeducational, 2,000 members)
- Christliche Pfadfinder Royal Rangers (Protestant, coeducational, 14,500 members); affiliated to Royal Rangers International
- Christliche Pfadfinderinnen und Pfadfinder der Adventjugend (Adventist, coeducational, 10,000 members); affiliated to Pathfinders International;
- Ring junger Bünde, an umbrella organization of about 20 independent interreligious Scout and Wandervogel organizations with troops in Germany, Austria and Spain (mostly coeducational, estimated 6,000 members); among its members is
  - Deutscher Pfadfinderbund (interreligious, coeducational, 3,000 members)
- Christliche Pfadfinderschaft Deutschlands (Protestant, coeducational, 4,000 members)
- Members of the Union Internationale des Guides et Scouts d'Europe:
  - Katholische Pfadfinderschaft Europas (Catholic, coeducational, 2,500 members)
  - Evangelische Pfadfinderschaft Europas (Protestant, coeducational, 500 members)

== Mergers of large male and female associations in the 1970s ==
The mainly male Bund der Pfadfinder (BdP) merged in 1976 with the female Bund Deutscher Pfadfinderinnen (BDP) to form the Bund der Pfadfinderinnen und Pfadfinder (BdP).

The three Protestant scout organisations Bund Christlicher Pfadfinderinnen (BCP), Evangelischer Mädchen-Pfadfinderbund (EMP) (both female) and Christliche Pfadfinderschaft Deutschlands (CPD) merged in 1973 to form Verband Christlicher Pfadfinderinnen und Pfadfinder (VCP).

The Catholic scout organisation Deutsche Pfadfinderschaft Sankt Georg is also open to girls and women since 1971. The primarily female Catholic organisation Pfadfinderinnenschaft St. Georg decided in 1982 not to merge with the inclusive counterpart.

== International Scout and Guide units in Germany ==
A large number of international Scout and Guide units from different countries are active in Germany. Most of them developed on military bases, but there are also some at international schools or connected to diplomatic missions. The majority of international Scout and Guide groups dates back to the Allied occupation of Western Germany following World War II. The small remainder were started recently.

Among the foreign associations in Germany are

- The Boy Scouts of America with about 120 units, served by three districts of the Transatlantic Council (Barbarossa District, Charlemagne District, and Edelweiss District)
- The Girl Scouts of the USA with about 80 units, served by USA Girl Scouts Overseas—North Atlantic (NORAGS) and by USAGSO headquarters
- Girlguiding UK with about 60 units, served by British Guides in Foreign Countries/Germany County in five divisions (Lower Saxony Division, Westphalia Division, EMS Division, West Rhine Division, and Independent District of Munich)
- The Scout Association with 11 groups, served by British Scouts Western Europe, Germany District.
- Scouts Canada (1952–1994)
- Scouting Nederland
- Külföldi Magyar Cserkészszövetség - Hungarian Scout Association in Exteris

There are also other foreign Scout associations active in Germany, mostly with single troops (e.g. Organization of Russian Young Pathfinders, Plast), Scouts et Guides de France in Munich and Hebrew Scouts Movement in Israel in Berlin.

The Dansk Spejderkorps Sydslesvig offers Scouting to the Danish minority of Southern Schleswig in Schleswig-Holstein. It is affiliated to the Danish Det Danske Spejderkorps as well as to the German Bund der Pfadfinderinnen und Pfadfinder and has about 700 members in 15 troops.

== See also ==
- Sturmtrupp-Pfadfinder
- Scouting in displaced persons camps
