= Deutscher Pressevertrieb =

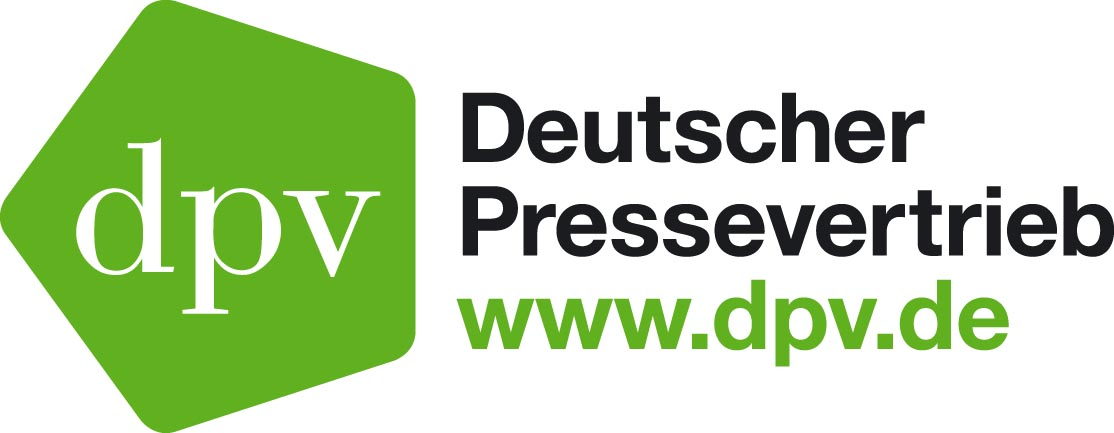
- Genre: Media
- Founded: 2006
- Headquarters: Hamburg, Germany
- Key people: Dr. Olaf Conrad (General Manager)
- Revenue: 1,1 bn Euro (2011)
- Number of employees: 500 (September 2011)
- Website: www.dpv.de

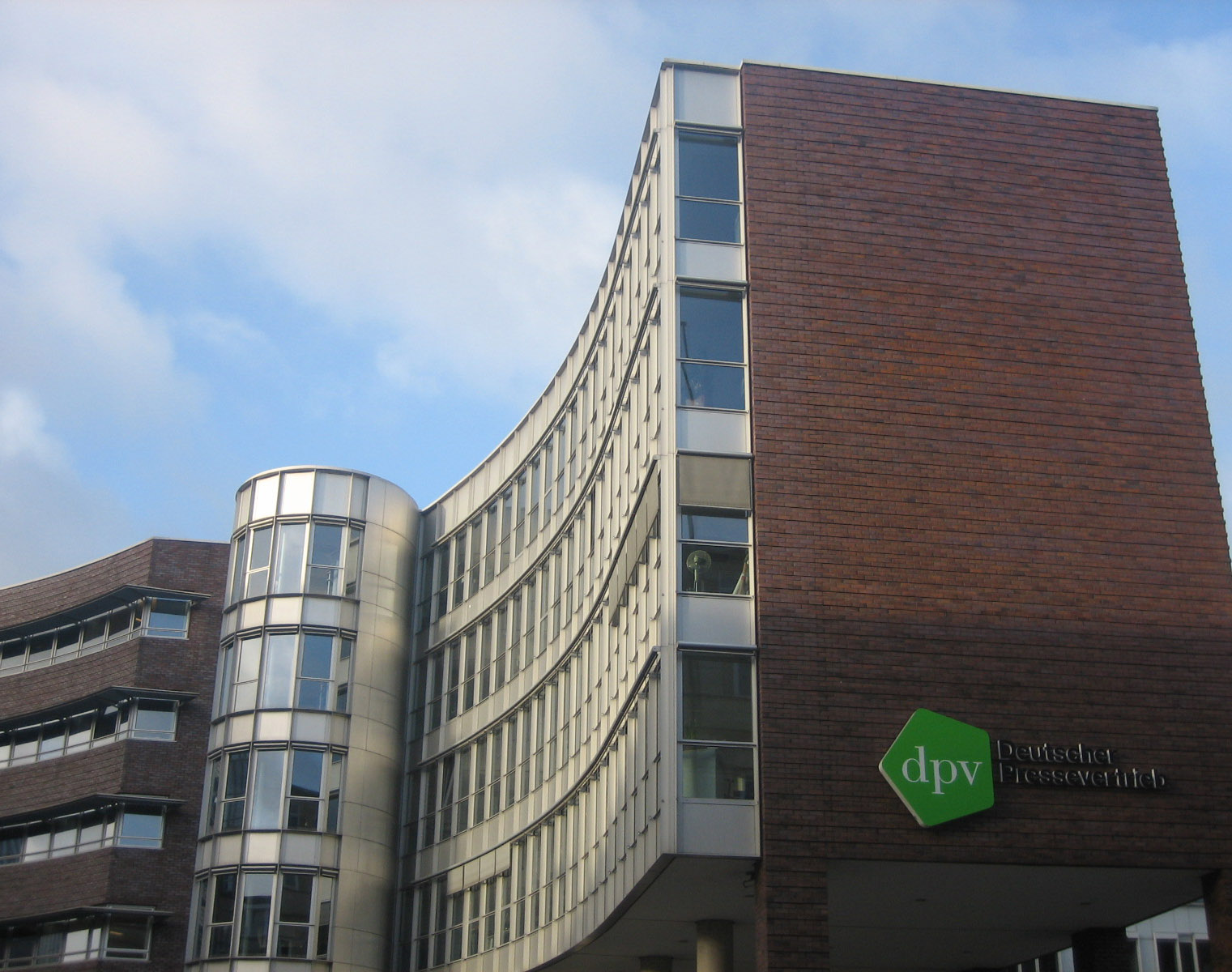
Headquarter of DPV in Hamburg

DPV Deutscher Pressevertrieb is a full-service distributor for the worldwide distribution of media products with its head office in Hamburg and further branches in Stuttgart, Mörfelden-Walldorf, Hürth and Munich.

== Company profile ==
DPV Deutscher Pressevertrieb, a complete subsidiary of the publishing house Gruner + Jahr, is a full-service distributor for the worldwide distribution of media products. DPV was established in 2006 as a result of a reorganisation of the complete distribution activities of Gruner + Jahr and their subsidiaries. All the distribution services for all clients are consolidated in this new organisation. The group accounts for a gross market turnover at cover prices of approx. 1.1 billion Euro. More than 500 employees at five branches in Germany are managing more than 5 million subscriptions. DPV takes care of the complete range of services for its clients such as distribution control, direct and retail marketing for print and digital media products, logistics as well as import and export of the media brands in question.

== Clients and products (selection) ==
Among the clients of DPV are for example the following publishers:

- Condé Nast Japan
- Condé Nast Russia
- Egmont Ehapa Verlag GmbH
- Gruner + Jahr AG & Co KG
- Jahr Top Special Verlag GmbH & Co. KG
- Marquard Media AG
- Ringier Publishing GmbH
- Van Gelderen B.V. (Netherlands)

Some of the titles are for example:

- AD Russia
- Cicero
- Cosmopolitan
- GEO
- Glamour Russia
- Glossy
- GQ Russia
- Micky Maus
- Party
- Stern
- St. Georg
- Tatler Russia
- Vogue Hommes Japan
- Vogue Japan
- Vogue Russia
- Vriendin
- Weekend

== Subsidiaries ==
Besides the five units of the DPV following companies belong to the group:

- BPV Berliner Pressevertrieb GmbH & Co. KG
- IP Internationale Presse GmbH & Co KG
- MSP Medien-Service und Promotion GmbH
- W.E. Saarbach GmbH
- DPV Network Rhein-Main (SI Special Interest GmbH & Co KG)
- interabo GmbH

== Commitment ==
DPV Academy, Futurum Distribution Reward

Commitment in different organisations and associations:

- Verband Deutscher Zeitschriftenverleger (VDZ)
- Arbeitskreis Mittelständischer Verlage (AMV)
- Distripress
- Deutscher Dialogmarketing Verband (DDV)
- Awardee kress awards 2010
- Awardee futurum Vertriebspreis 2010

== Literature ==
- Peter Brummund: Struktur und Organisation des Pressevertriebs: Absatzformen, Absatzhelfer und Absatzwege in der Vertriebsorganisation der Zeitungs- und Zeitschriften-Verlage. Saur, Dortmund 2006, ISBN 978-3-598-11449-6
