= Bund der Pfadfinderinnen und Pfadfinder =

Interdenominational Scouting association in Germany

Bund der Pfadfinder*innen
- German Association of Guides and Scouts
- Headquarters: Zentrum Pfadfinden Immenhausen
- Location: Immenhausen
- Country: Germany
- Founded: 1971/1976
- Membership: 30,000
- Bundesvorstand: Alexander Schmidt, Annika “Punzel” Schulz
- Affiliation: Ring deutscher Pfadfinder*innenverbände
- Website http://www.pfadfinden.de/

The Bund der Pfadfinder*innen (BdP) (German Association of Guides and Scouts, formerly "Bund der Pfadfinderinnen und Pfadfinder") is the largest non-denominational, co-educational Scout and Guide association in Germany. Through its membership in the Ring deutscher Pfadfinder*innenverbände, it is part of the World Organization of the Scout Movement and the World Association of Girl Guides and Girl Scouts. Founded in 1976, the association serves about 30,000 members nationwide.

== Program ==
BdP's working methods consist of weekly meetings, hikes, camps and other activities for its three age sections. These are organized by volunteer youth leaders. The program is based on nine pillars:

- Working in groups
- Peer education
- Co-Education
- Holistic development of physical, intellectual, social, emotional, and spiritual competencies
- International peace and understanding
- Adventure in nature
- Learning by doing
- Democracy and participation
- Shared traditions

=== Sections ===
The association is divided in three sections according to age:

German name	English translation	age range
Wölflinge	Cub Scouts (used for girls and boys)	7 to 11
Pfadfinderinnen und Pfadfinder	Guides and Scouts	12 to 15
Ranger und Rover	Ranger Guides and Rover Scouts	16 to 25

Erwachsene (adults) (26 years and up) do not constitute a target age section for BdP's programs. They are, however, recognized and welcome as support volunteer staff and leaders.

=== Promises ===
==== Cub Scouts ====
Ich will ein guter Wölfling/Freund sein und unsere Regeln achten.

Die Regeln lauten:

Ein Wölfling hilft wo er kann und

ein Wölfling nimmt Rücksicht auf andere.

I will be a good Cub Scout/friend and follow our rules.
The rules are:
a Cub Scout helps wherever he/she can and
a Cub Scout is considerate.

==== Scout and Guide Promise ====
Ich will (im Vertrauen auf Gottes Hilfe)
nach den Regeln der Pfadfinderinnen und Pfadfinder
mit euch leben.

(With confidence in God's help)
I promise to live with you
in accordance with the Guide and Scout Law.

The religious formula is optional.

==== Rangers and Rovers ====
There is no prescribed promise for the oldest age sections. Rangers and Rovers are expected to come up with their own promise based on the Guide and Scout Law after a period of reflection.

=== Guide and Scout Law ===
- Ich will hilfsbereit und rücksichtsvoll sein.
  I will be helpful and considerate.
- Ich will den Anderen achten.
  I will be respectful.
- Ich will zur Freundschaft aller Pfadfinderinnen und Pfadfinder beitragen.
  I will be a friend to all Guides and Scouts.
- Ich will aufrichtig und zuverlässig sein.
  I will be honest and trustworthy.
- Ich will kritisch sein und Verantwortung übernehmen.
  I will use my own judgement and assume responsibilities.
- Ich will Schwierigkeiten nicht ausweichen.
  I will not avoid difficulties.
- Ich will die Natur kennenlernen und helfen, sie zu erhalten.
  I will acquaint myself with nature and help to conserve it.
- Ich will mich beherrschen.
  I will become master of myself.
- Ich will dem Frieden dienen und mich für die Gemeinschaft einsetzen, in der ich lebe.
  I will serve peace and the community I live in.

=== Principles ===
The work within BdP is characterized by the founding principles of the Guide and Scout Movements (e.g. the Scout Promise and Scout Law) as well as by its emphasis on youth leadership and peer education. BdP is a recognized German charity and its activities are carried out by volunteer leaders only, with few exceptions for administrative personnel on national and district level.

=== Political affiliations ===
As a community youth organization, BdP is independent from political parties/organizations but promotes a comprehensive citizenship education through non-formal educational means on national, regional, and local level. In recognition of the organization's peace-building capacities, German Minister of Finance Wolfgang Schäuble donated €50,000 to BdP in 2015 in order to support international citizenship education through the Scout and Guide method.

=== Funding ===
As a community youth organization, BdP's funding consists of membership fees, donations and public grants.

=== Co-education ===
Since its inception in 1976, BdP has subscribed to a co-educational approach. Programs and structures are thus targeted towards mixed groups with few local exceptions. This is reflected in the organization's logo which unites the Guide movement's trefoil and the Scout movement's fleur-de-lis. BdP is furthermore a part of both the World Organization of the Scout Movement (WOSM) and the World Association of Girl Guides and Girl Scouts (WAGGGS) through its memberships in the Federation of German Scout Organizations (Ring deutscher Pfadfinderverbände) and the Federation of German Guide Organizations (Ring Deutscher Pfadfinderinnenverbände). BdP registers its male members with WOSM and its female members with both WOSM and WAGGGS.

=== Uniform ===
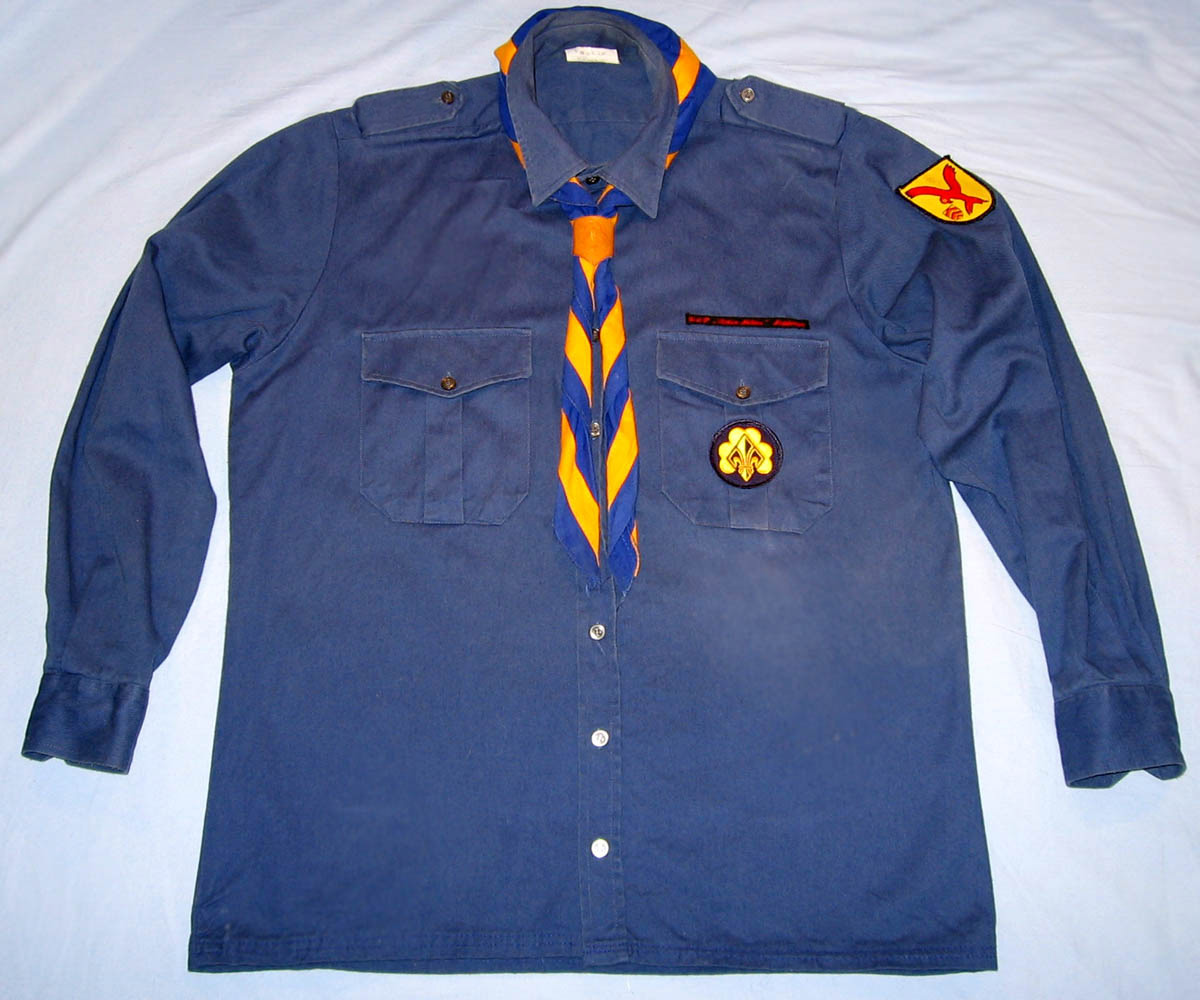
Uniform (older variant)

The formal BdP uniform consists of three elements:

- a dark-blue uniform shirt with BdP embroidered on the flap of the front pocket on the right.
- a Scout scarf in accordance with the age section of the individual: yellow for Cub Scouts, blue-yellow for Scouts and Guides, blue-yellow with the R/R badge sewn onto the corner for Rangers/Rovers; members who have successfully completed their Gilwell/Woodbadge training may wear their beads intertwined with their scarves.
- badges: the BdP logo on the left front pocket, the Germany/EU flag above the left front pocket, the world organization logo(s) on the left sleeve.

BdP registers its male members with WOSM and its female members with both WOSM and WAGGGS. Thus male members may wear one world organization logo on their sleeves, whereas female members may wear both next to each other.

== Organizational structure ==
As per its constitution, BdP is subdivided into districts (Landesverbände), which in turn consist of local troops (Stämme). Currently, BdP is subdivided into twelve districts which mostly adhere to the borders of the German Bundesländer. Notable exceptions are the merged districts of Berlin-Brandenburg, Rheinland-Pfalz/Saar, and Schleswig-Holstein/Hamburg. Mecklenburg-Vorpommern is covered by the latter; Dansk Spejderkorps Sydslesvig is associated with Schleswig-Holstein/Hamburg as well.

The highest decision-making institution at each level is the members' or delegates' assembly. The organization's structures and processes are modeled on a representative democracy, meaning the delegates for each subsequently higher level are elected by the assembly of the level underneath.

At national level, the delegates' assembly elects a board for a 3-year term. The board consists of a Chief Scout/Guide and a number of deputies. By request of the delegates, dual leadership is possible when the role is split among a woman and a man. The national board in turn appoints national commissioners for departments, e.g. the age sections, international affairs or citizenship education.

== Institutions ==
=== National headquarters ===
BdP is headquartered at Zentrum Pfadfinden in Immenhausen in Hessia. The center houses not only BdP's central administration but offers conferences and camp spaces. It is booked regularly by Scouts/Guides, other NGOs and businesses.

=== Stiftung Pfadfinden ===
In order to support BdP's work, a foundation - Stiftung Pfadfinden - was established in 1998.

=== Member magazine ===
The member magazine Pfade is published quarterly and distributed to members and outside stakeholders. It is supplemented by an online blog.

== See also ==
- Chrissy Pollithy
