= Verband Christlicher Pfadfinder*innen =

German Protestant coed Scouting and Guiding association

- Association of Christian Scouts and Guides
- Location: Kassel
- Country: Germany
- Founded: 1973
- Membership: 22,000
- Bundesvorstand: Leah Albrecht, Peter „flip“ Keil, Eric Stahlmann, Daniel Werner
- Website http://www.vcp.de

The Verband Christlicher Pfadfinder*innen (roughly: Association of Christian Guides and Scouts, formerly Verband Christlicher Pfadfinderinnen und Pfadfinder, VCP) is a German Protestant coed Scouting and Guiding association. According to the VCP, the organization has about 22,000 members.

It is a member of the Ring deutscher Pfadfinder*innenverbände (Federation of German Scouting and Guiding Associations, rdp), which in turn is a member of the World Organization of the Scout Movement (WOSM) and of the World Association of Girl Guides and Girl Scouts (WAGGGS).

In 2023 the organisation voted to rename itself to "Verband Christlicher Pfadfinder*innen" to make the name gender neutral.

== History ==
The association was formed in 1973 through the merger of three Protestant associations:

- Bund Christlicher Pfadfinderinnen (founded in 1922; only in Bavaria; girls only)
- Christliche Pfadfinderschaft Deutschlands (first groups in 1910, founded in 1921; boys only until 1969)
- Evangelischer Mädchen-Pfadfinderbund (founded in 1926; not in Bavaria; girls only)

In 1976, some traditional Scouting groups left and formed a separate association, using the former name Christliche Pfadfinderschaft Deutschlands again.

Two years later, the VCP held his first national jamboree. Since then, roughly every four years a national jamboree has taken place:

- 1978 - Kirchberg, near Koblenz
- 1984 - Eschwege
- 1988 - Ruhpolding
- 1992 - Ferschweiler Plateau, near Trier
- 1998 - Rheinsberg in Brandenburg
- 2002 - Rehau, near Nuremberg
- 2006 - Großzerlang, near Rheinsberg in Brandenburg
- 2010 - Wolfsburg
- 2014 - Schachen, near Münsingen in Baden-Württemberg
- 2017 - Wittenberg
- 2022 - Grosszerlang at National Campground of the VCP

In 1990, after the fall of the Berlin Wall, the first groups of Protestant Scouts and Guides were formed in the still existent German Democratic Republic. Today, the VCP is present in all Federal States of Germany.

== Program ==
The association is divided in three age-groups:

- Kinderstufe - Cub Scouts (ages 7 to 10)
- Pfadfinderstufe - Scouts (ages 10 to 15)
  - Jungpfadfinderinnen and Jungpfadfinder (ages 10 to 13)
  - Pfadfinderinnen and Pfadfinder (ages 13 to 16)
- Roverstufe - Rover Scouts (ages 16 to 20)

The age-groups can be identified by their scarfs. Cubs wear scarfs with orange stripes, Jungpfadfinder with light green stripes, Pfadfinder scarfs with dark green stripes and Ranger/Rover scarfs with bordeaux-red stripes.

There is also a special branch for adults in Scouting, the Erwachsenenarbeit, which aims at all members older than 21 years including leaders and non-leaders. They wear scarfs with purple stripes.

Like most German Scout associations, the VCP emphasizes on youth leadership. Most patrol leaders start at 16 and most leaders up to district level are younger than 25.

=== Promise ===
The VCP has no common Scout Promise. Its constitution proposes the following text, but other wordings are possible:

Im Vertrauen auf Gottes Hilfe
will ich christliche Pfadfinderin/christlicher Pfadfinder sein
und nach unseren Regeln mit euch leben.

Trusting on the help of God
I want to be a Christian Scout/Christian Guide
and to live with you according to our rules.

=== Rules ===
The association has no common Scout Law. It uses Scout rules, which should be formulated individually by each group. The constitution proposes a number of points, which should go into these rules. Despite this, many subdivisions of the association use a common Scout Law.

== Scout centres ==
The VCP runs two national Scout centres:

- Rieneck Castle in Lower Franconia, near Würzburg
- VCP-Bundeszeltplatz (National Campground of the VCP) in Großzerlang near Rheinsberg in Brandenburg

as well as a number of regional Scout centres mostly maintained by subnational divisions of the association.

Rieneck Castle was leased by the Christliche Pfadfinderschaft Deutschlands in 1959 and bought in 1967. It is mainly used for training courses on national level, and the annual International Creative Workshop (IMWe). The VCP-Bundeszeltplatz was bought in 1997 and hosts camps from group to national level.

== International Creative Workshop ==
The International Creative Workshop (German: Internationale Musische Werkstatt (IMWe)) is an annual Scouting and Guiding event run by the VCP. It usually takes place at Rieneck Castle. As a Wood Badge training event, the aim of IMWe is to give leaders of Guide and Scout groups the opportunity to explore their creative talents in a relaxed setting. IMWe is prepared on behalf of the VCP by an international group of scouts who meet several times a year to organize the workshop, which is held around Easter. The workshop lasts for 8 or 9 days, with a symbolic framework or theme. Participants have to be aged 17 years or older. IMWe has been represented at international Scouting events such as EuroJam 2005 and World Scout Moot in 2015.

== See also ==
- Scouting in Germany
