= Ludwigstein Castle =

Coordinates: 51.322°N 9.909°E

Ludwigstein Castle (German: Burg Ludwigstein) is a 15th-century castle overlooking the river Werra and surrounded by woodland. It stands southwest of the town of Witzenhausen in North Hesse. Founded in 1415 the castle's buildings today were built in the 16th and 20th centuries. It was allowed to go to ruin in the late 19th century.

After the First World War, the Wandervogel and German Youth Movement joined together to save the castle. In 1920 they founded the Jugendburg Ludwigstein Association to buy the structure, renovate it, and erect a memorial to the fifty thousand Wandervogel who had been killed from 1914 to 1918. During the Nazi period, however, the castle became first a training center for the Hitler Youth, then a destination for city children evacuated to avoid air raids during the Second World War. After the war it served briefly as a refugee camp. Suppressed in 1941, the Jugendburg Ludwigstein Association was re-founded in 1945, and took renewed possession of the castle in 1946.

The castle's youth education centre (Jugendbildungsstätte) offers both daily programs and weekend seminars, ranging from ecological topics to music and political education. Also on site are the Archives of the German Youth Movement with their own library and collections of personal papers.

The castle is today the main center of the Bündische Jugend and many German Scouting associations.

The castle also serves as a hostel with up to 180 beds and different meeting rooms.

- Knud Ahlborn (1888–1977)
- Ellen Gregori (1897–1981)
- Eberhard Koebel (1907–1955) founder of 'Deutsche Jungenschaft vom 1.11.1929'
- Alexander Lion (1870–1962) founder of first German Scout Organization 'Deutscher Pfadfinderbund'
- Karl Otto Paetel (1906–1975)
- Gertrud Prellwitz (1869–1942)
- Gustav Wyneken (1875–1964)

== Pictures ==
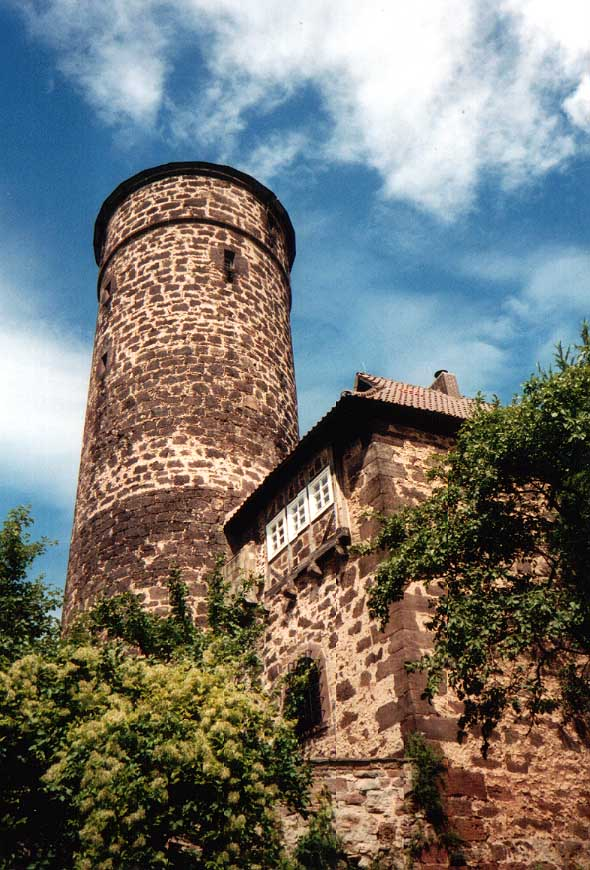
Ludwigstein today

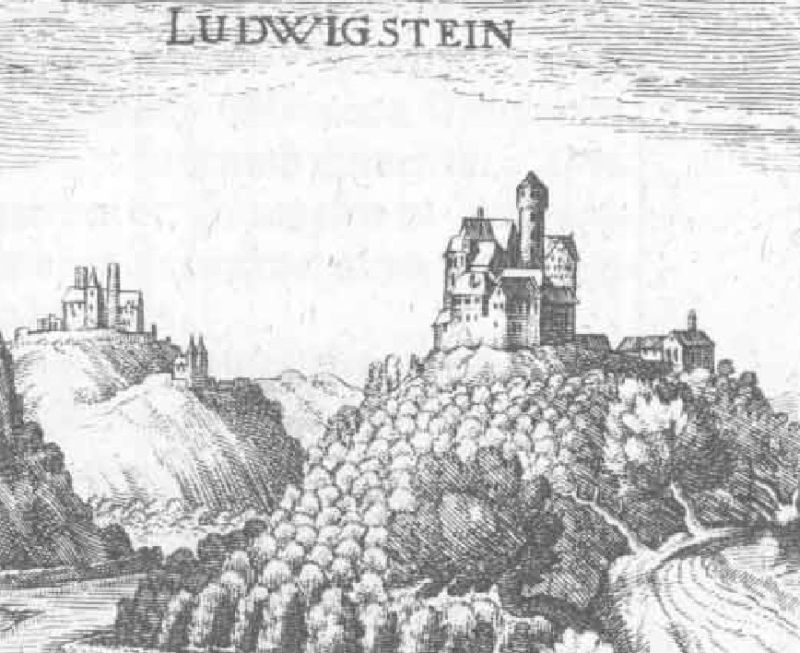
Matthäus Merian's 1655 engraving in Topographia Hassiae
