= Deutscher Pfadfinderbund (1911–1933) =

First national German scouting association

- The chessboard, official emblem of the DPB
- Headquarters: Berlin
- Country: Germany
- Founded: 1911
- Founder: Georg Baschwitz
- Membership: around 90,000
- Reichsfeldmeister: Maximilian Bayer
- Affiliation: World Organization of the Scout Movement 1929-1933

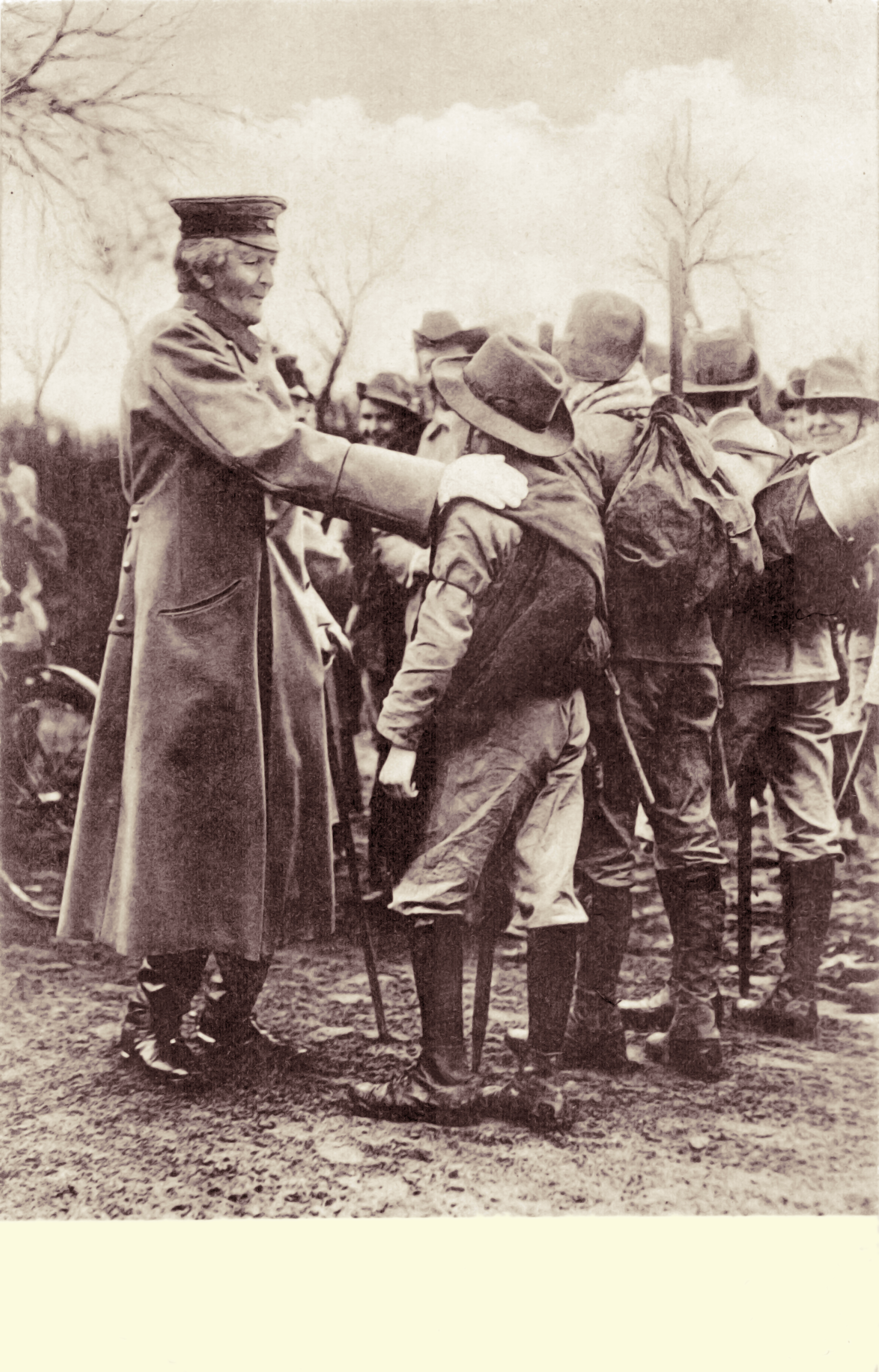
Gottlieb Graf von Haeseler with boy scouts in 1914

The Deutscher Pfadfinderbund (DPB) (literal translation German Scouting Union) was the first German Scouting association, and the forerunner of the Deutscher Pfadfinderbund (1945). It existed from 1911 until 1933, when it was disbanded by the National Socialists.

== History ==
Scouting in Germany started in 1909. The Deutscher Pfadfinderbund was founded on 18 January 1911 in Berlin, becoming the first Scouting union in Germany. Being the first-and, at least in the beginning, the only-of its kind in Germany, the Pfadfinderbund quickly gained around 90,000 members.

Under the direction of consul Georg Baschwitz, the first Scoutmaster (in German: Reichsfeldmeister or Bundesführer, literally field-leader of the realm, or union-leader) was military person and Scouting pioneer Maximilian Bayer. The military background of Bayer was reflected in the military orientation the Pfadfinderbund had in the beginning.

== After World War I ==
With the end of World War I, the Scouting movement in Germany strove to reintroduce a general structure, and reorganized the Pfadfinderbund in 1918. The first years of the newly formed Bund were marked by a recurring conflict about the orientation, between the "old" members that were active before World War I, and the "new" ones. While the old leading members almost all served in the German military during the war and wanted to rebuild the Pfadfinderbund in its old form, the new, progressive powers leaned more towards the Wandervogel as being more back-to-nature orientated and less nationalistic. This two main factions were the "jungdeutschen" (young German) and the "neudeutschen" (new German) Scouts. The latter adopted the so-called Prunner Gelöbnis (Vow of Prunn) in 1919, which became the German Scouts' epigraph, replacing the older Meißner-Formel (Meissner Formula) adopted at the October 1913 meeting on Hohe Meissner.

The first "Reichsfeldmeister" (fieldleader of the realm) after the war was Carl Freiherr von Seckendorff, chosen in Eisenach in 1919. While von Seckendorff was of the old leadership generation, both Scouting factions remained in the union.

== Secessions ==
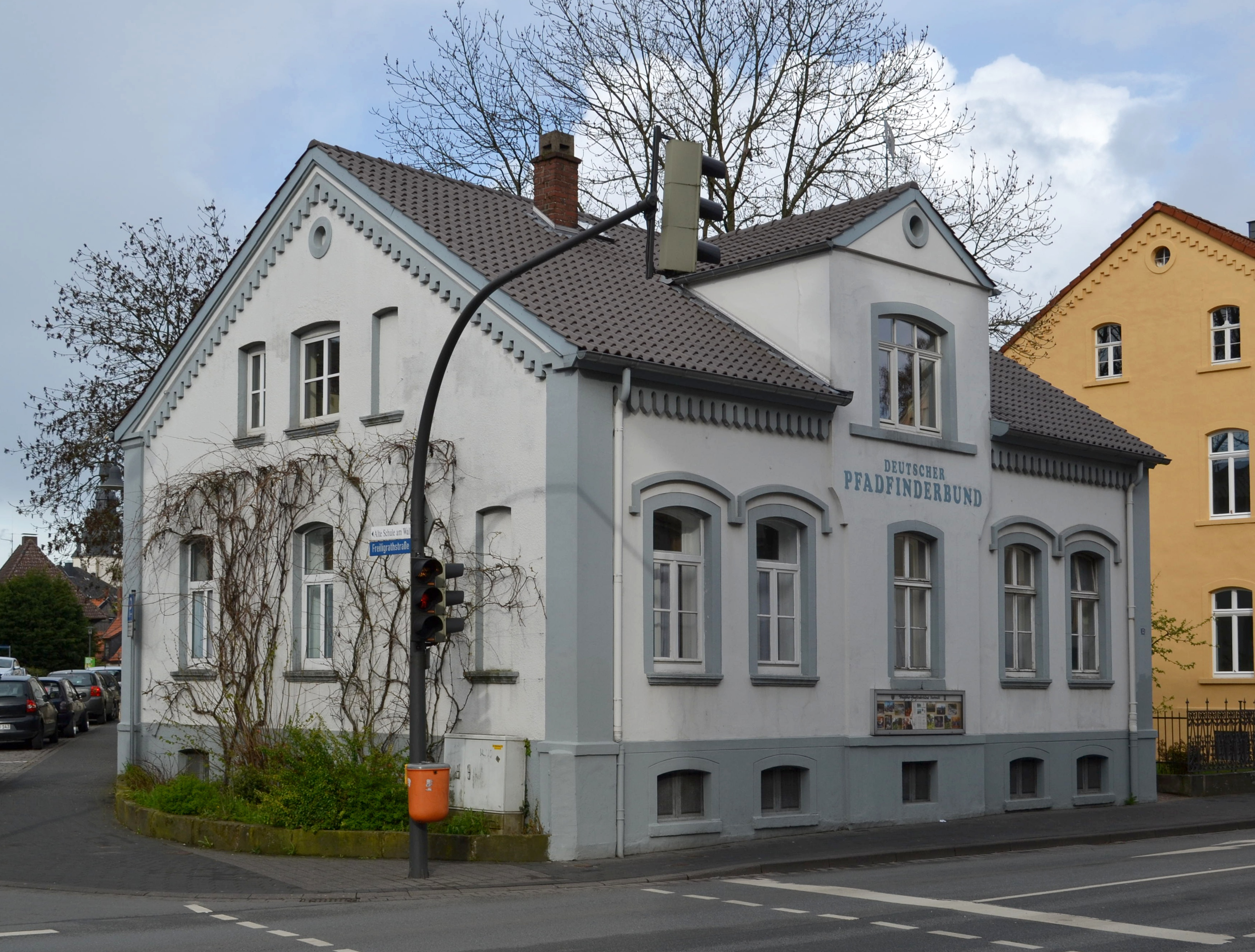
Former DPB quarters in Detmold

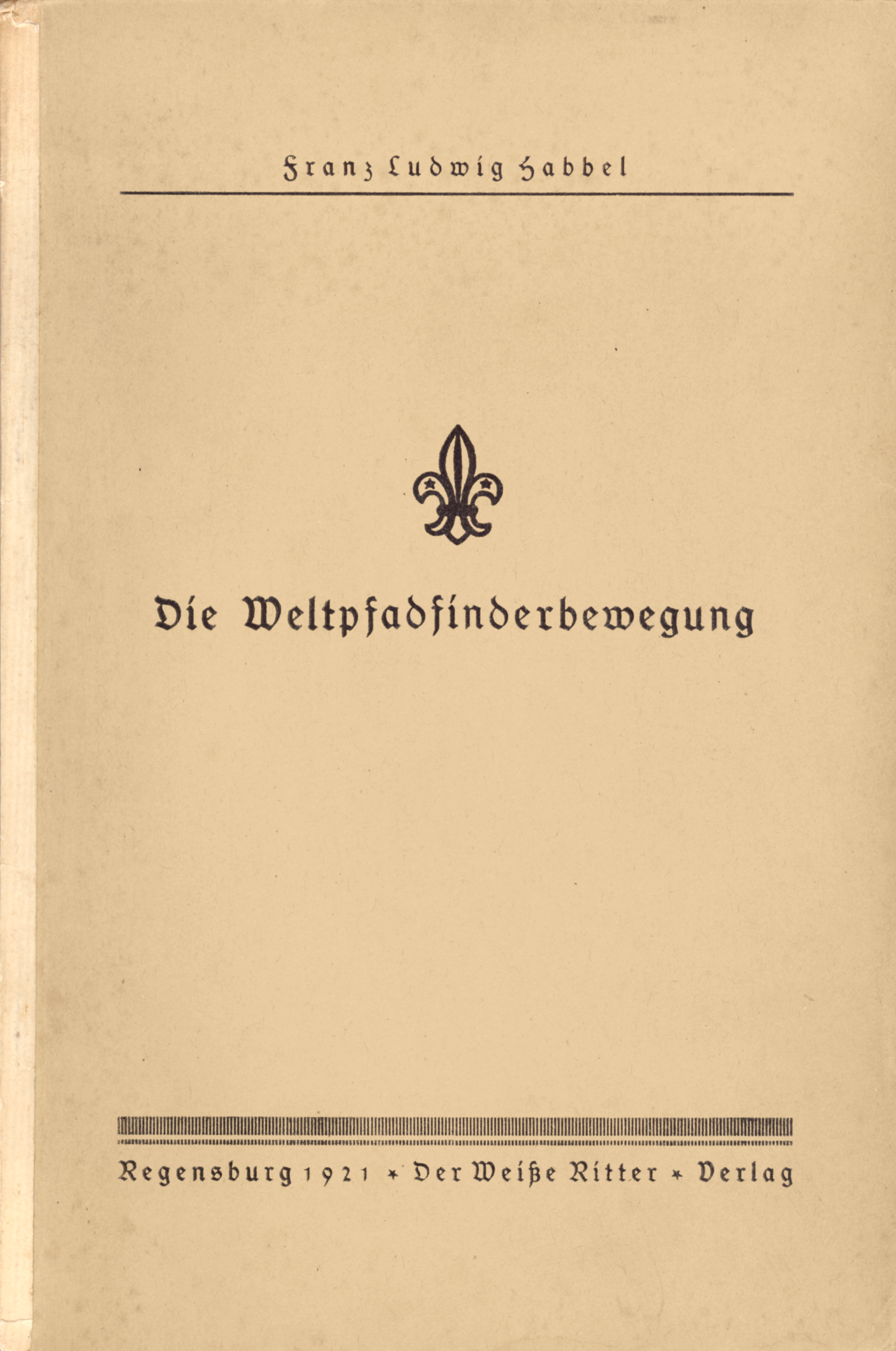
Franz Ludwig Habbel's The World Scout Movement special edition of the official magazine of the Bund Deutscher Neupfadfinder

This soon changed in 1920, when two leaders of the Neupfadfinder (New Scouts) faction, Martin Voelkel and Ludwig Habbel, were ejected from the Bund. Both "Jungdeutsche" and "Neudeutsche" formed their own Scouting organization after that, the "Bund Deutscher Neupfadfinder (BDN)" (Union of German new Scouts), in 1921. More factions, already existing and recently formed ones within the Pfadfinderbund, seceded soon after. The Neupfadfinder's renunciation followed the "Ringgemeinschaft" (Ring community), a moderate renewal movement, that founded the "Bund deutscher Ringpfadfinder" (Union of German Ring-Scouts) in 1922. Von Senckendorff himself left the Bund in 1923 to found the "Deutsche Pfadfinderschaft" (German Scouting movement). The short-lived, Eberhard Koebel-lead "Deutsche Jungenschaft vom 1. November 1929 (dj 1.11.)" (German young society of 1 November 1929), itself included as recently as 1931, left the Bund the same year, and more secessions followed up to 1933.

== Before the dissolution ==
Meanwhile, life for the Deutscher Pfadfinderbund went on. Still being one of the largest organizations of its kind in Germany, despite the numerous renunciations, the Bund went on to develop itself further. They adopted the Scouting-typical clothing consisting of green shirt and scarf in 1922, and in 1928 they formed an international office communally with the "Bund deutscher Reichspfadfinder" (Union of Empire Scouts) and the "Kolonialpfadfindern" (Colonial Scouts). This international Scouting office later became the "Deutscher Pfadfinderverband" (German Scouting Federation), and joined the World Organization of the Scout Movement in 1929.

In 1933, the Bund Deutscher Pfadfinder finally dissolved when all their members had to join the Hitler Youth.

== See also ==
- Scouting in Germany
- Ring deutscher Pfadfinderverbände

== Bibliography ==
- Franz Ludwig Habbel: Die Weltpfadfinderbewegung. Der Weiße Ritter Verlag, Regensburg 1921
- Werner Kindt: Die Deutsche Jugendbewegung 1920 bis 1933. Die bündische Zeit. Eugen Diederichs Verlag, Düsseldorf, Köln 1974, ISBN 3-424-00527-4
- Rudolf Kneip: Jugend in der Weimarer Zeit. Handbuch der Jugendverbände 1919–1938. dipa-Verlag, Frankfurt am Main 1. Auflage 1974, ISBN 3-7638-0211-8
