= Sturmtrupp-Pfadfinder =

- Country: Germany
- Founded: 1929
- Defunct: 1934
- Founders: Erich Mönch (Schnauz), Helmuth Hövetborn (Doktor)
- Reichsfeldmeister: Helmuth Hövetborn (Doktor)

The Sturmtrupp-Pfadfinder was a Scout association in Germany active from 1926 to 1934. The association never had more than 500 members. It was the first Scout association in Germany to admit boys and girls. It was interdenominational and politically neutral.

== History ==
=== 1923-1933 ===
Since 1923, there had been Scout groups within the International Organisation of Good Templars (IOGT) in Germany. There was a strong influence from the Neupfadfinder. The Neupfadfinder was a group of German and Austrian Scouters and Scouts, who tried to modernize Scouting under the influence of the Wandervogel movement and of the Kindred of the Kibbo Kift. They founded among other things a publishing house and published the translation of the books of John Hargrave in their Verlag Der Weiße Ritter. The Sturmtrupp-Pfadfinder continued the traditions and style of the Neupfadfinder, after the Neupfadfinder and other groups of the German Youth Movement founded the Deutsche Freischar.

In 1927 there were three Scout groups which formed the District Sturmtrupp Süd:

- Jukkasjärvi in Stuttgart
- Rüppurr, named after a quarter of Karlsruhe, in Karlsruhe
- Wölfe in Mannheim

In the following years, Scout groups of the association were founded all over the German Reich, and groups of the Wandervogel and other Scout associations joined.

In 1929, Erich Mönch (Scout name: Schnauz) and Helmuth Hövetborn (Scout name: Doktor) founded the Sturmtrupp-Pfadfinder-die Reichspfadfinderschaft im Deutschen Guttemplerorden (IOGT). After the Bundesthing (general assembly) in Roßlau the name was changed in "Sturmtrupp-Pfadfinder, eine deutsche Waldritterschaft". Helmut Hövetborn and Erich Mönch became Chief Scouts.

At the National Jamboree (German: Bundeslager) in 1931 at the Hoher Meißner, the Districts "Sturmtrupp Nord" and "Sturmtrupp Mitte" became part of the Scout association.

In 1932 it became an independent organization.

Scout groups within the IOGT were founded in the Netherlands, Sweden, Norway, Switzerland and the United Kingdom. The Sturmtrupp-Pfadfinder had strong contacts with groups in Scandinavia and the Netherlands. Still active is the Nykterhetsrörelsens Scoutförbund, it is the Scout association of the IOGT in Sweden. There were plans to found a federation with the groups in Scandinavia, the Netherlands and Germany and name it Northern European Scout Association (German: Nordeuropäischen Pfadfinderverband).

=== 1933-1945 ===
In 1934, the last meeting of the association took place. Shortly after, the voluntary liquidation followed, the equipment and the Scout houses were destroyed, so that the Hitler Youth was not able to take them. The Scout center Jungenland was sold in 1934. Scouting continued in different ways:

- The Scout group Rüppurr and the Cub Scout pack Zeisige in Karlsruhe joined the Reichsschaft Deutscher Pfadfinder (another Scout association), that was banned shortly afterwards.
- The Scout group Grauer Reiter in Soldin continued its work until it had to join the army. All its members died on the Eastern Front. This group consisted of sons of farmers and were horse riders.
- The Scout group Braune Bären in Berlin was able to continue as a special unit called Technische Bereitschaft within the Hitler Youth until 1939, when the unit was disbanded. New members gave the Scout Promise.

Helga Barth, the Cubmaster of the pack Zeisige in Karlsruhe, was arrested and died in Ravensbrück concentration camp.

=== 1945-1948 ===
In 1945, there were plans of a re-foundation by the Chief Scout Helmut Hövetborn and other old scouts of the association. In 1946, former members of the Scout group Rüppurr met in Ettlingen. In 1947, there were groups in Mannheim, Heidelberg and Karlsruhe. The Landesmark Nordbaden and later the Tübinger Bund were founded and allowed by the French Military government. On 14 March 1948, the Chief Scout Helmut Hövetborn died. He was succeeded by Richard König (Scout name: Alter), a member of the Scout group Rüppurr.

The Tübinger Bund had contacts with Scout groups in Bavaria, Hesse and Alexander Lion, one of the founders of German Scouting.

In 1948, the Tübinger Bund joined the Bund Deutscher Pfadfinder, the interreligious member organization of the Ring deutscher Pfadfinderverbände. Erich Mönch, one of the founders of the Sturmtrupp-Pfadfinder was a founder member of this association.

In 1956, the Gau Grauer Reiter, named after the Scout group Graue Reiter in Soldin of the Sturmtrupp-Pfadfinder, left the Bund Deutscher Pfadfinder.

Today, there is still a group of former Sturmtrupp-Pfadfinder within the association "Fördergemeinschaft Grauer Reiter e. V." The Fördergemeinschaft Grauer Reiter e. V. is a group of adults, grown up in different youth and Scout association, which support the work of the Scout association Pfadfinderschaft Grauer Reiter and especially its national centre, the Hohenkrähen Castle near Lake Constance (Bodensee). The Pfadfinderschaft Grauer Reiter is a small independent Scout association in Germany with about 350 members. It was founded by Erich Mönch. It preserves the history and traditions of the Sturmtrupp-Pfadfinder.

== Program ==
The work of the Scout association was based on the teachings of Ernest Thompson Seton. A big part of the programme was arts and crafts and adventurous travels, especially to Sweden and Norway. Each member of the association should make one piece of art or handicraft each year. All the pieces were shown at the National Jamborees.

Decision making was organised as a grassroots democracy. Decisions on national level were made by a meeting of all leaders of the local Scout groups called Bundesthing. On a group level, decision were made in a similar way.

The magazine of the association was Jugendland. Between 1929 and 1933, 24 issues were published, and between 1946 and 1948, 3 more.

The national camp site of this Scout association was called Jungenland and it was situated near Döffingen. Döffingen is today a quarter of Grafenau. It was bought in 1927.

Troops of the association travelled to foreign countries and took part in international camps with scouts from groups associated with the International Organisation of Good Templars from the United States, Great Britain, The Netherlands and Scandinavia.

== Membership ==
Most groups of the association were based in Southern Germany and there never was more than 500 members.

=== Known groups ===
- Founder members of the Sturmtrupp Süd:
  - Scout group Wölfe (Wolves) – Mannheim
  - Scout group Jukkasjärvi - Stuttgart
  - Scout group Rüppurr – Karlsruhe
- Further members of the Sturmtrupp Süd:
  - Girl Guides group Wildkatzen (Wildcats)-Stuttgart
  - Cub Scout pack Zeisige-Karlsruhe
  - Scout group Füchse (Foxes)-Tübingen
  - Girl Guides group Burg (Castle)-Tübingen
  - Scout group Adler (Eagle)- Rottenburg am Neckar
- Members of the "Sturmtrupp Nord":
  - Scout group Grad dör- Bremen
  - Scout group Widukind-Oldenburg
  - Scout group Wiking (Viking)-Düsseldorf
- Members of the "Sturmtrupp Mitte":
  - Scout group Braune Bären (Brown bears) -Berlin
  - Scout group Grauer Reiter (Grey riders) -Soldin
  - Scout group Goten (Goths)-Dessau

== Bibliography ==
- Vierzig Jahre Pfadfinderschaft Grauer Reiter-Bundesschrift der Pfadfinderschaft Grauer Reiter (in German). Vol. 106/107. Pfadfinderschaft Grauer Reiter. March 1997.
- Büffel (March 2000). Der Graue Reiter (in German). Vol. 109. p. 8.
