= Eberhard Koebel =

German youth leader, writer and publisher

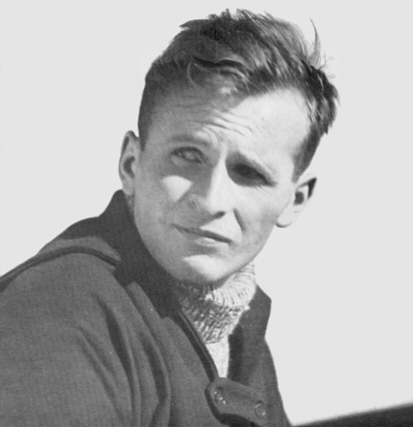
- Eberhard Koebel circa 1930
- Born: 22 June 1907; Stuttgart, Germany
- Died: 31 August 1955 (aged 48); Berlin, Germany
- Occupations: Youth leader, writer, publisher, tent designer and Nazi resister.

Eberhard Koebel also Eberhard Köbel, called tusk, i.e., "the German" in the language of the Sámi people he traveled among, (22 June 1907 – 31 August 1955) was a German youth leader, writer, and publisher.

Eberhard Koebel was born in Stuttgart on 22 June 1907. From the age of 13, in 1920, Koebel was a member of the Wandervogel. Koebel soon became a leader in the movement, inventing the Kohte, a tent design that consists of several smaller canvas panels that are carried by individuals and then assembled when they reach the campsite.

In 1926 Koebel joined the Deutsche Freischar, a fusion of Wandervogel and Scout organizations; a year later, he advocated the formation of a unified German youth association for boys. On 1 November 1929 Koebel established the dj.1.11. In the beginning secret conspiracy within the Deutsche Freischar to renew and mobilize it, it later broke off, when the leader of the Freischar, Ernst Buske, no longer accepted an organisation within the organisation. As leader of the Jungenschaft Koebel designed the Kohte and a particular jacket, the Jungenschaftsjacke. With these and other elements such as songs and writings he created a very influential style within the German Youth Movement. In the spring of 1932, hoping to make a more effective resistance to the Nazis, he resigned as head of DJ 1.11. and joined the Young Communist League and the Communist Party of Germany.

On 18 January 1934, about a year after Hitler's seizure of power, Koebel was arrested for trying to infiltrate the Hitler Youth. After being severely maltreated in custody several times, he was released from Columbia Haus Prison in Berlin at the end of February 1934, and banned from future youth work. During the Night of the Long Knives of 30 June 1934, Koebel narrowly missed being murdered by fleeing via Sweden to London. On his travel to Sweden Koebel visited a Scout group of the Sturmtrupp-Pfadfinder, which was led by his university friend Erich Mönch. In England, Koebel kept in contact with the Free German Movement. Koebel returned to Berlin in 1948 and worked as a writer and author in East Germany until his death on 31 August 1955.
