= Deutsche Freischar =

German youth organization

- Country: Germany

The Deutsche Freischar – Bund der Wandervögel und Pfadfinder (DF) is a German youth organization. Originating from the merger of several small Wandervogel and Scouting groups, it was one of the largest and most important associations of the Bündische Jugend of the Weimar Republic besides the Deutscher Pfadfinderbund and Reichsschaft Deutscher Pfadfinder.

== History ==
In 1926 the DF originated from the association of the Großdeutscher Pfadfinderbund (itself an association of the Bund Deutscher Neupfadfinder and Bund der Ringpfadfinder) with the Altwandervogel, Deutsche Jungenschaft, the Wandervogel, Deutscher Jungenbund and the Reichsstand, Gefolgschaft deutscher Wandervögel forming the Bund der Wandervögel und Pfadfinder. In March 1927 the Bund der Köngener joined; in April of the same year it was renamed to Deutsche Freischar; on 27 October 1927 the Wandervogel-Mädchenbund joined. Until 1928 several smaller groups joined; at the end of 1929 the DF had 12,000 members (among them 1500 women and girls).

On 4 May 1930 the DF and the Großdeutscher Jugendbund (under Admiral Adolf von Trotha) united under the name Deutsche Freischar. The result was a large association with up to 16,000 members, which split again after some weeks, so the former Deutsche Freischar became an independent association again.

During the association of Freischar and Großdeutscher Jugendbund Eberhard Koebel, known under his totem name Tusk, was excluded from the association, some districts followed him and formed their own association, the Deutsche Jungenschaft vom 1.11.1929 (dj. 1.11); he became its leader.

On 17 June 1933 the DF, together with other member organizations of the Großdeutscher Bund, was prohibited by Baldur von Schirach, who was appointed Jugendführer des Deutschen Reiches (Youth Leader of the German Reich) shortly before.

In 1946, the Deutsche Freischar was re-founded as Sturmschwalben – Ring Deutscher Jugendgruppen, later named itself Bündische Freischar, and since 1950 is again called Deutsche Freischar. In 1953 and 1954 a major part of the association merged into the Neuer Bund, from which the Bund deutscher Jungenschaften (BdJ) originated later.

The Freischar still exists with some hundred members. The Freischar is a member of the Ring junger Bünde (RjB).

== Bibliography ==
- Klaus Rauschert: "Und wieder erblüht nach Nebel und Nacht ..." : Bundesgeschichte der Freischar; 1946 bis 1953; über die Neugründung eines Jugendbundes und zur Jugendpolitik in den Nachkriegsjahren. Published by Jugendbewegung Südmarkverlag Fritz, Stuttgart 2006, ISBN 3-88258-147-6
