= Carl Freiherr von Seckendorff =

Carl August Ludwig Wilhelm Freiherr von Seckendorff-Aberdar
- Born: April 8, 1874
- Died: January 3, 1948; Erkenbrechtshausen
- Burial place: Erkenbrechtshausen
- Spouse: Ida Lüdorff (1875-1960)
- Military career
- Allegiance: Prussian
- Rank: General of division
- Unit: Deutscher Pfadfinderbund
- Other work: One of the founders of Scouting in Germany

Prussian general of division Carl Freiherr von Seckendorff was one of the founders of Scouting in Germany, along with Maximilian Bayer and Elise von Hopffgarten. He was the first "Reichsfeldmeister" (fieldleader of the realm) of the Deutscher Pfadfinderbund after World War I.

In February 1912, Bayer, von Seckendorff, Elise von Hopffgarten, and Alexander Lion authored "Pfadfinderbuch für junge Mädchen" (A Scout Book for Girls). In its effort to make young women more independent, it was free from patriotic or religious sentiment, and contained references to the women's movement.

== Family ==
Seckendorff was born into the Seckendorff family, an old noble family of Franconia. He had three daughters: Marianne, Ilse and Erika.

== After World War I ==
With the end of World War I, the Scouting movement in Germany strove to reintroduce a general structure, and reorganized the Pfadfinderbund in 1918. The first years of the newly formed Bund were marked by a recurring conflict about the orientation, between the "old" members that were active before World War I, and the "new" ones. While the old leading members almost all served in the German military during the war and wanted to rebuild the Pfadfinderbund in its old form, the new, progressive powers leaned more towards the Wandervogel as being more back-to-nature orientated and less nationalistic. This two main factions were the "jungdeutschen" (young German) and the "neudeutschen" (new German) Scouts. The latter adopted the so-called Prunner Gelöbnis (Vow of Prunn) in 1919, which became the German Scouts' epigraph.

The first "Reichsfeldmeister" (fieldleader of the realm) after the war was Carl Freiherr von Seckendorff, chosen in Eisenach in 1919. While von Seckendorff was of the old leadership generation, both Scouting factions remained in the union.
