= Ring junger Bünde =

- Abbreviation: RjB
- Type: Umbrella organization
- Headquarters: Witzenhausen
- Region served: Germany, Austria and Spain
- Members: 6000

The Ring junger Bünde (RjB) is an umbrella organization of about 20 independent and self-responsible interreligious German Scout and Wandervogel youth associations, based in Witzenhausen and established in 1964. RjB and all the youth organizations represented in it profess the Declaration of Principles adopted at Meißnertag in 1963.

RjB has troops in Germany, Austria and Spain (mostly coeducational, estimated 6,000 members). Among its members are the Deutscher Pfadfinderbund (interreligious, coeducational, 3,000 members) as well as the Deutsche Freischar.
