= Elise von Hopffgarten =

German author

- Born: Hennoch; January 29, 1869; Altenburg
- Died: 1937
- Occupations: Author and founder of the Deutschen Pfadfinderbundes für junge Mädchen
- Writing career
- Notable work: Pfadfinderbuch für junge Mädchen

Elise Hermine von Hopffgarten, née Hennoch (January 29, 1869 in Altenburg-after 1937) was a German author and founder of the Deutschen Pfadfinderbundes für junge Mädchen. On January 14, 1912, the Deutschen Pfadfinderbundes für junge Mädchen was founded at the instigation of Maximilian Bayer, in which several Scout groups existent since 1908, some of which previously were attached to the Wandervogel, merged. Hopffgarten was elected by the Assembly in the Pestalozzi-Fröbel-Haus to be the first chairman and held that position until 1922. In this role, she was editor of the club magazine and made numerous lecture tours around Germany, to promote Scouting. By mid-1914, the organization had 6,200 members. In 1915 the organization launched the Kriegsgarten "war gardens", in which children were taught horticulture and were fed.

In February 1912, Bayer, Alexander Lion, and Carl Freiherr von Seckendorff assisted Elise von Hopffgarten in authoring "Pfadfinderbuch für junge Mädchen" (A Scout Book for Girls). In its effort to make young women more independent, it was free from patriotic or religious sentiment, and contained references to the women's movement.
