= Vogelfrei =

German term for a banished person

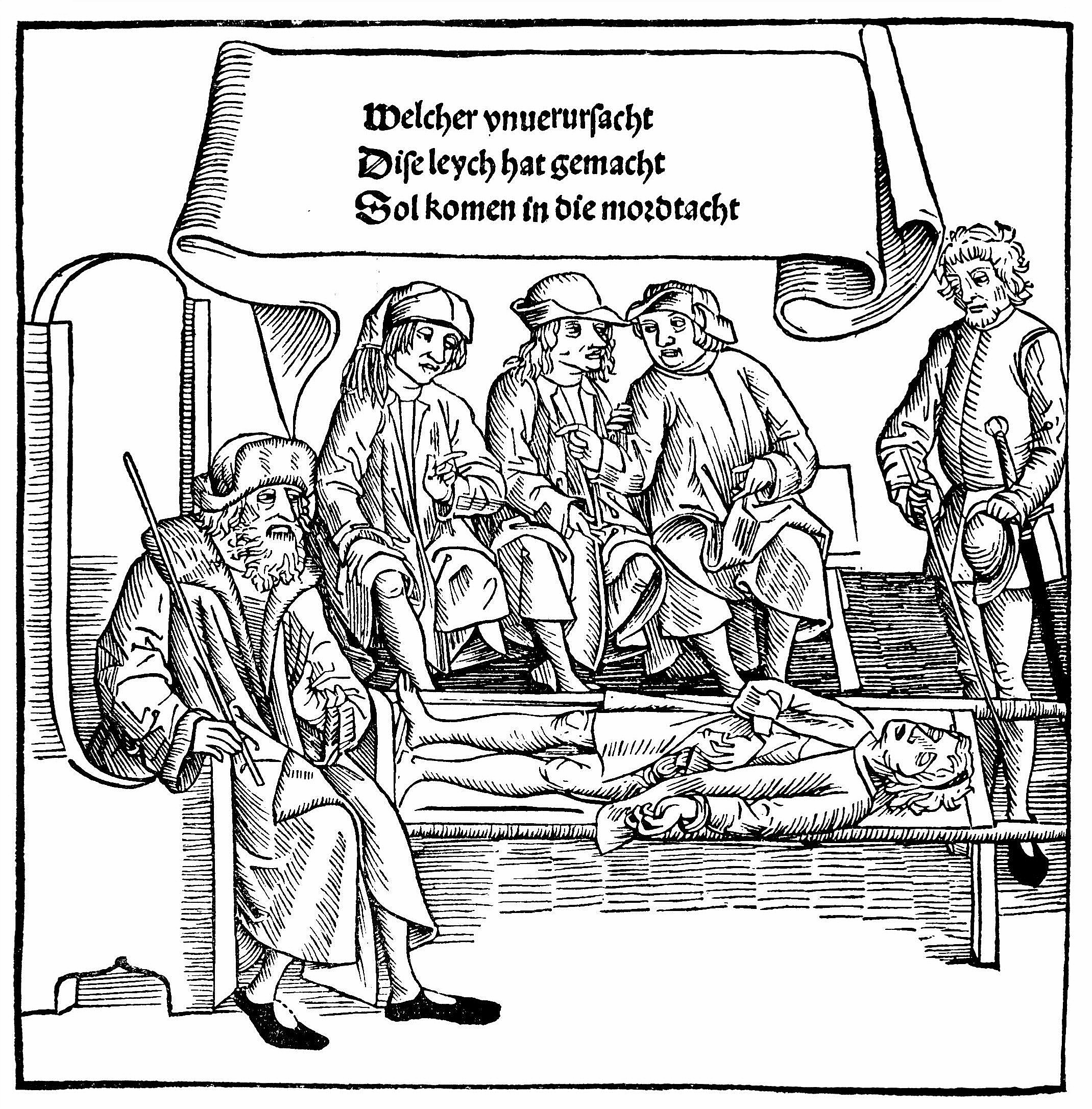
Judge and lay judges impose a sentence of outlawry for murder. Woodcut from the Bamberger Halsgerichtsordnung (1507)

Vogelfrei (Dutch: Vogelvrij and Afrikaans: Voëlvry) in German usage denotes the status of a person on whom a legal penalty of outlawry has been imposed. However, the original meaning of the term referred to independence, being "free as a bird".

== History and etymology ==
Originally, the word vogelfrei merely meant "as free as a bird, not bound." That is the usage in a German source from 1455. Even Martin Luther (1483–1546) and Huldrych Zwingli (1484–1531) used the term still in its original meaning. As of the 1507 Bamberg Halsgerichtsordnung (penal code of Bamberg) the term was linked to a person being banned. This resulted from the formulas:

As you have been lawfully judged and banished for murder, so I remove your body and good from the state of peace and rule them strifed and proclaim you free of any redemption and rights and I proclaim you as free as the birds in the air and the beasts in the forest and the fish in the water, and you shall not have peace nor company on any road or by any ruling of the emperor or king.

and

his body should be free and accessible to all people and beasts, to the birds in the air and the fish in water so that none can be made liable for any crimes committed against him

This ban also implied that persons sentenced thus were not to be granted any dwelling: "Aquae et igni interdictus" (Latin: Deprived of water and hearth fire). In the case of death one's body was not buried, but left for the birds to feed on."permissus avibus" (Latin: free for the birds)

The current negative meaning developed only in the 16th century. It then came to predominate through the influence of Baroque poetry and of Jacob Grimm's Deutsche Grammatik (German Grammar; 1819).

According to modern research the cause for the spreading of the pejorative meaning is not to be sought there but rather in the language of the mercenaries and soldiers of that time. This theory is supported by the loan word "Preis" [price] in German (Italian: presa, French: prize), which in this context is synonymous with the word "booty". Malicious people would be "preis gegeben und vogelfrey" [lit: given away and free as the birds], noted thus as a pair of terms in Constitutio criminalis Theresiana [Maria Theresa's Criminal Law], from 31 December 1768.

In Das Kapital, Volume I, Karl Marx uses the term vogelfrei to refer to the emergence of the proletariat during the decay of feudalism:

The proletariat created by the breaking-up of the bands of feudal retainers and by the forcible expropriation of the people from the soil, this free and rightless* [vogelfrei] proletariat could not possibly be absorbed by the nascent manufactures as fast as it was thrown upon the world. On the other hand, these men, suddenly dragged from their accustomed mode of life, could not immediately adapt themselves to the discipline of their new condition. They were turned in massive quantities into beggars, robbers and vagabonds, partly from inclination, in most cases under the force of circumstances. Hence at the end of the fifteenth and during the whole of the sixteenth centuries, a bloody legislation against vagabondage was enforced throughout Western Europe. The fathers of the present working class were chastised for their enforced transformation into vagabonds and paupers. Legislation treated them as 'voluntary' criminals, and assumed that it was entirely within their powers to go on working under the old conditions which in fact no longer existed.

Marx calls this second group free or "bird-free" (vogelfrei), meaning at one and the same time that while the proletariat are not property (as slaves), they are themselves without property and cast out of the community of property owners.

Friedrich Nietzsche wrote a compilation of poems titled Lieder des Prinzen Vogelfrei ("Songs of Prince Vogelfrei") and included it as an appendix to The Gay Science.

== See also ==
- Knight-errant
- Mopery
- Troubadour
- Vagrancy (people)
- Wandervogel
- The Voëlvry Movement
