= Maximilian Bayer =

Founder of Scouting in Germany

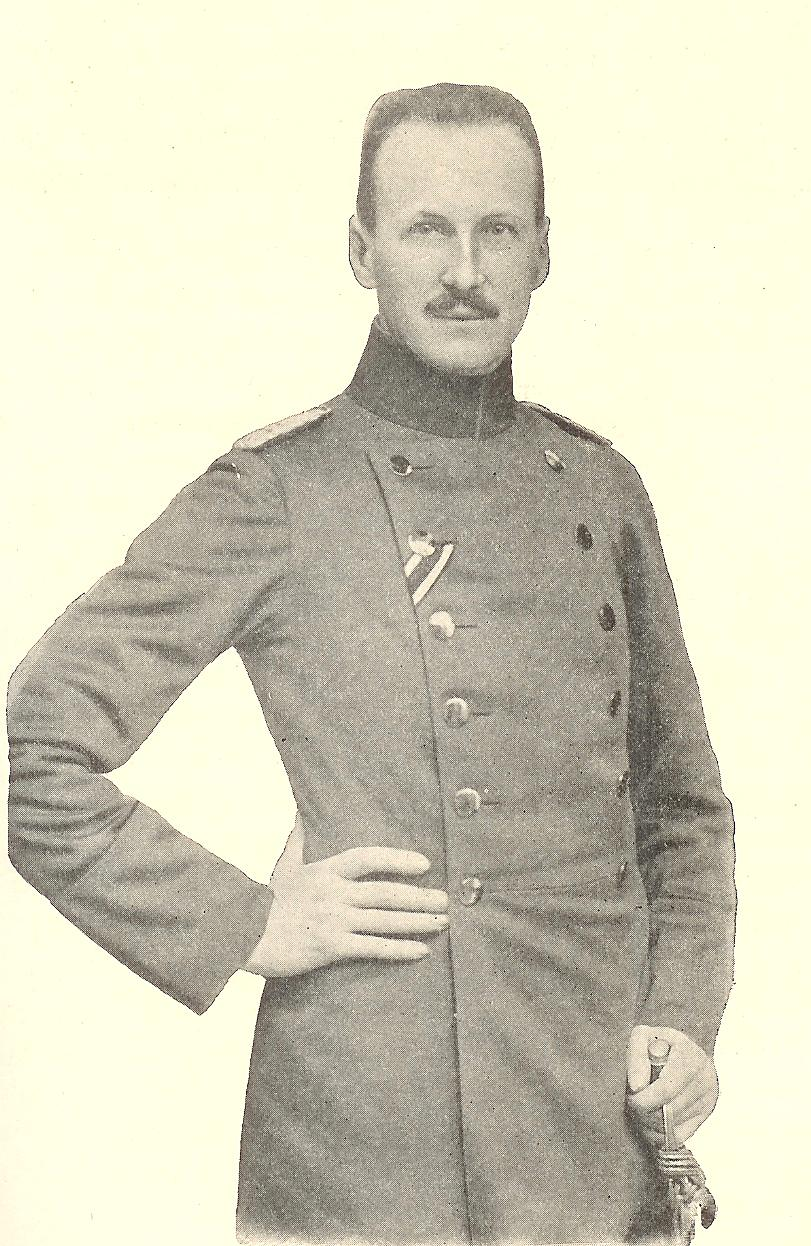
- Maximilian Bayer in 1916
- Born: 11 May 1872; Karlsruhe, German Empire
- Died: 25 October 1917 (aged 45); Nomeny, France
- Military career
- Allegiance: German Empire
- Branch: Imperial German Army (German South West Africa) Schutztruppe
- Service years: 1887–1917
- Rank: Major
- Units: 97th Infantry Regiment; 138th Infantry Regiment; 27th Infantry Regiment; 2nd Sea Battalion; Schutztruppe of German South West Africa
- Commands: 27th Jäger Battalion; 259th Reserve Infantry Regiment
- Conflicts: Herero Wars; World War I: Western Front †
- Awards: Order of the Red Eagle; Iron Cross
- Other work: Scouting pioneer, author

Major Maximilian Bayer (11 May 1872 – 25 October 1917) was the founder of Scouting in Germany, along with Alexander Lion. During World War I, he built the 27th Royal Prussian Jäger Battalion, later the core of the Finnish Army.

== Life ==
Bayer was the first of two children born to Major General Stephan Bayer (1816–1893) and his second wife, Julie Henoch (1839–1888). During his early life the family moved often between Italy and Germany, living in Pisa, Florence, Bagni di Lucca, Viareggio, Baden-Baden and Gotha. While living in Baden-Baden, the nine-year-old Bayer suffered from a severe case of diphtheria of the eye. The family moved to Italy again between 1883 and 1886, and it was during this time living in Capri and Venice that he became familiar with Italian language and culture.

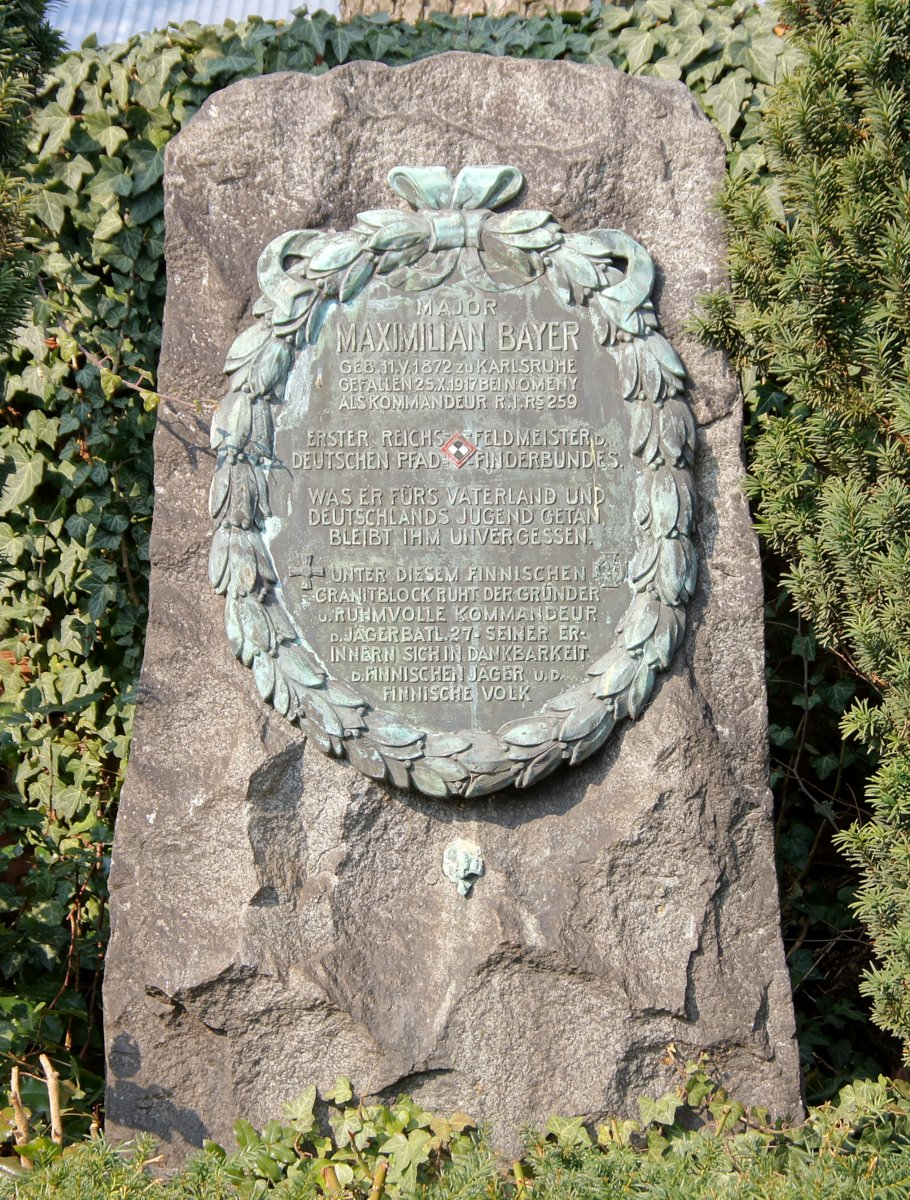
His grave in Mannheim

In 1887, at the age of 14, he continued his family's military tradition by enrolling as a cadet in a Berlin military academy. His mother died the next year. Bayer graduated from the school – the main military academy for the Prussian army – as a second lieutenant in 1891.

Bayer continued his career in the Prussian army and volunteered during the Herero Wars in German South-West Africa in 1904. He returned to Germany in 1905 after contracting typhoid fever and experiencing heart troubles. Upon his recovery, he embarked on a popular lecture tour in Germany on the topic of the colonial war in Africa. He also published several books about his experiences under the pseudonym "Jonk Steffen." In 1906, Bayer expressed support for Herero and Nama genocide:

"Our Lord has made the law of nature such that only the strong of the world have a right to continuity, while the weak and purposeless will perish in favor of the strong. The day will come when the Hottentots will disappear, but it will not be a loss for humanity because they are all only born robbers and thieves, nothing more."

Bayer was killed by a sniper during World War I on Germany's Western Front in 1917. His remains were not identified until 6 months later and he was originally buried in the soldier's cemetery in Metz. In 1926, Bayer's remains were moved to his family's burial place in the main cemetery in Mannheim.

== Founding of the German Scouting movement ==
In late 1908, Bayer met Alexander Lion at a meeting of the German Colonial Society. Lion had served as a medical officer during the war in German South-West Africa. At the time, Lion had been in correspondence with Lord Baden-Powell, the founder of the worldwide Scouting movement, and was devoting much of his free time to the establishment of Scouting in Germany. Bayer agreed to work with Lion to edit and publish a German translation of Baden-Powell's "Scouting for Boys." The book was first published as "Das Pfadfinderbuch" (The Scout Book) in May 1909.

On 20 January 1909, the first German Scout troop, "Jugendsport in Wald und Feld" (Youth Sport in Woods and Fields) was formed in Berlin. Its first chairman was the well respected General Counsel Georg Baschwitz. Bayer was elected to the board. There was much opposition to the organization, however. Lion, Bayer, and their colleagues were faced with opposition from military, civilian, and church leaders, who objected to Scouting on the grounds that it was anti-patriotic. Opponents observed that Scouting originated in England, which was one of Germany's greatest political rivals at the time. A wave of attacks in the press followed shortly thereafter, in March 1909, and the founders of the organization faced social exclusion over their participation in Scouting. As a result of these pressures, Bayer resigned from the organization in May of that same year and his name was removed from the title page of later editions of "Das Pfadfinderbuch". However, Bayer had contributed much essential material to the book, including the sections on nature, Scouting techniques, and patriotism.

When the German Scout Association (DPB) was founded in 1911, Bayer was elected "First Reich Field Master," a post which he would hold until his death. He also took an unpaid leave that year due to ongoing heart problems and to devote himself to the design of the German Scouting movement. In May, the second edition of the Scout Book was published. This version, which again featured Bayer's name on the title page, was a completely revised edition. In an attempt to find compromise with Scouting's many critics, it distanced itself from much of Baden-Powell's original thought. The book was to become the model for the first German Scouts.

In the spring of 1912 Emmerich Teuber, founder of the Vienna Boy Scouts Corps, visited Bayer in Berlin. Teuber was disappointed, however, that Bayer's efforts to establish Scouting in Germany had been met by such massive resistance. It appeared that the only viable compromise would be a unilateral pre-military youth training.

Between October and November 1912, Bayer, Lion and Carl Freiherr von Seckendorff were subject to attack from General Alban von Jacobi, who accused them of, amongst other things, lacking in support for their country, King and religion. Jacobi created an anti-Semitic cartoon lampooning Lion, playing on Lion's Jewish birth, changing "Jungensport in Feld und Wald" (youth sports in field and forest) to "Judensport in Wald und Feld" (Jews' sports in forest and field), and calling Scouting supporter General Baschwitz a "vain Jewish man".

In February 1912, Bayer, Lion, and von Seckendorff assisted Elise von Hopffgarten in authoring "Pfadfinderbuch für junge Mädchen" (A Scout Book for Girls). In its effort to make young women more independent, it was free from patriotic or religious sentiment, and contained references to the women's movement.
