= Kohte =

Tent used in Germany

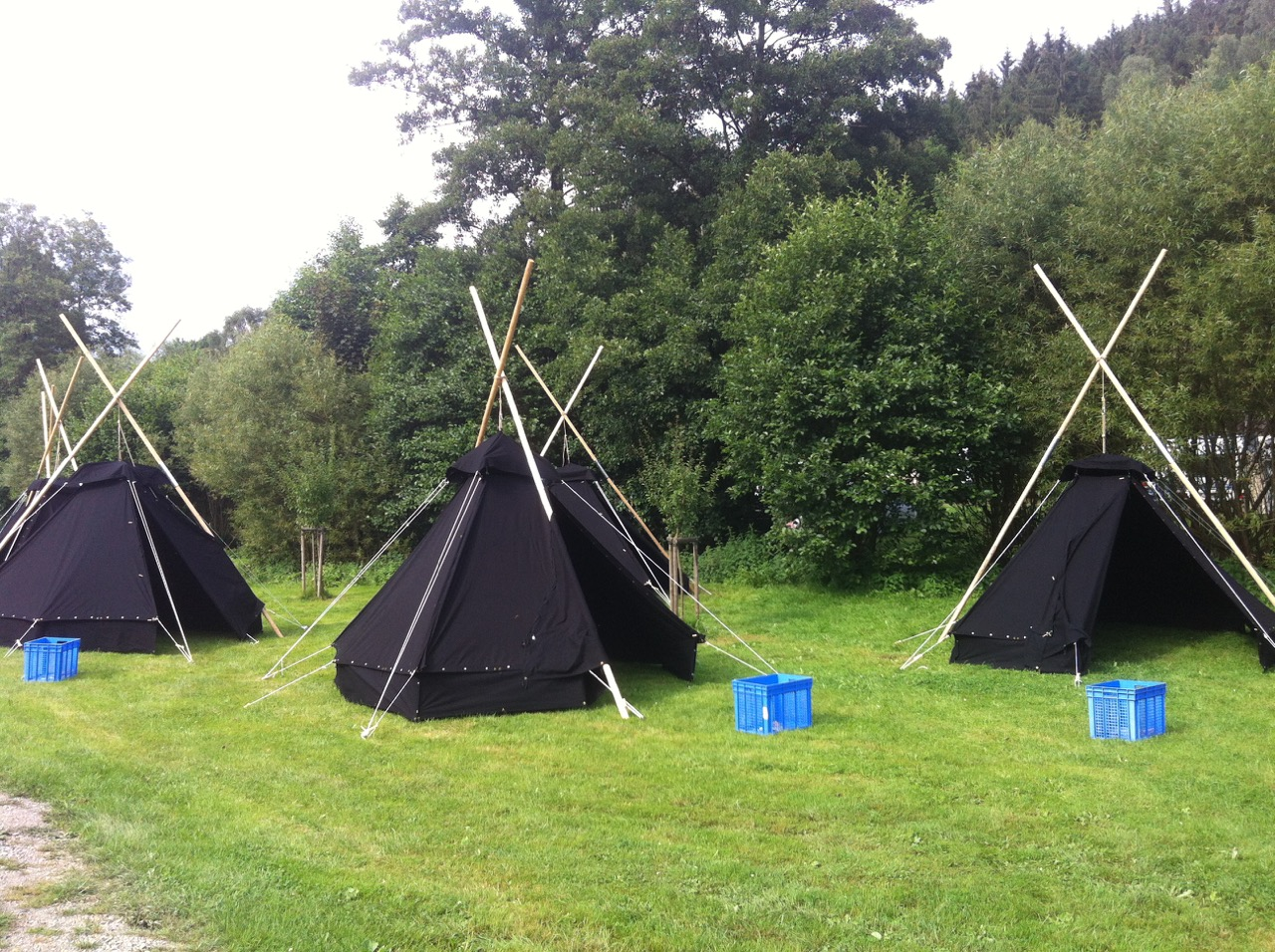
Kohtes in a camp

The Kohte [ˈkoːtə] is the typical tent of German Scouting and the German Youth Movement. Based on the Sámi goahti and lavvu and developed in the late 1920s and early 1930s, it is an open-topped tent assembled on-site from four characteristically shaped panels, which are traditionally black, and uses two tent poles lashed together in a V shape, from which the top of the tent is suspended using crossed sticks. The central hole serves as a smoke hole, so that a fire inside the tent is possible.

== Construction ==
Shape of the panels that make up a kohte

The kohte is assembled on-site from four identical panels of heavy canvas, almost always black, each formed by sewing two triangles together and cutting off the apex. The four panels together weigh approximately 10 kilograms (22 lb); separately, they can be carried to the campsite by several members of the group. The panels are fastened together using either a loop and grommet system or a loop-strap system, depending on the manufacturer. A vertical base may be added under the panels.

The tent is suspended by means of two crossed sticks from two long poles that are lashed together to form a V shape or A-frame, usually outside the tent; it can also be secured to an overhanging tree branch. It is secured to the ground with pegs. Traditionally, both the poles and the pegs are cut on-site rather than transported.

The assembled tent sleeps four to eight and has a smoke hole, so a fire can be lit inside; in rainy weather, this is covered with a tarpaulin.

=== Variants and extensions ===
Lean-tos and bivouac shelters sleeping one to three people can be made using one panel (a kröte, 'toad') or two (a locomotive). A larger tent, the Jurte ('yurt') is made using six kohte panels for the roof (six panels form a circle) and twelve rectangular panels to form a vertical side wall; it can sleep twenty or be used as a camp kitchen or assembly tent. Still larger structures are possible using many panels.

== History ==
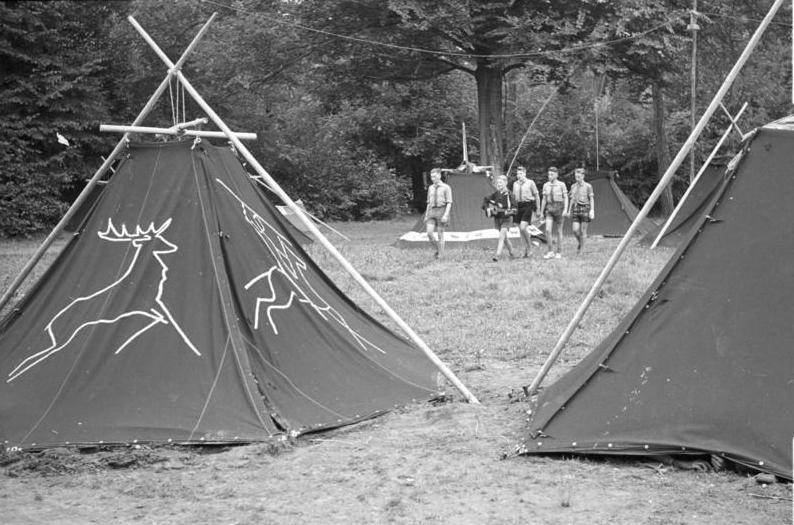
German Scout camp, 1960

Eberhard Koebel, a leader in the German Youth Movement, developed the kohte with friends on the model of Sámi tents, wanting to reproduce their characteristic central roof hole, which made a fire inside the tent possible for winter camping. He gave it the name kohte based on the Swedish term for Sámi tents, kåta. The prototype, made in Stuttgart, was presented in summer 1928 at a camp at the Kollenburg near Dorfprozelten, but resembled a teepee: it was supported by many poles that crossed at the top, transported to the site as rail luggage, and the panels were sewn together and were white with coloured upper and lower sections. After his move to Berlin in 1930, Koebel and a friend who was then an engineering student, Ernst Voos, refined the design to consist only of four panels, which would be light enough for four boys to each carry one to the campsite in their packs. Originally the panels had buttons with the same spacing used in German military tents, which the Scouts and Youth Movement groups had previously used; these were replaced with loops for lashing the panels together. The use of two lashed tent poles also developed at this time, initially together with four set perpendicularly in the ground, to which the crossed sticks were secured. Koebel came to prefer black tents, as less disturbing in the natural landscape. The coloured bands were replaced with a tradition of decorating the black tents with hand-drawn designs.

Koebel's Berlin group, the Deutsche Jungenschaft vom 1.11.1929, held its first winter camp with kohtes in the Black Forest in 1931–32. At some point in the early 1930s, this form of the kohte began to be mass manufactured and was sold as single panels and as a kit together with pre-cut bamboo poles, tent pegs, and the sticks for suspension, through Tadep, the group's official outfitter. After the Nazis came to power and replaced the youth movements with the Hitler Youth and League of German Girls, in 1935 Artur Axmann, the leader of the Hitler Youth in Berlin, banned the kohte as an indication of an "anti-Volkish" and "cultural Bolshevist" mindset, and those who continued to use it were prosecuted.

After World War II, the kohte was reintroduced and it became the most used type of tent in German Scouting. It is also common in Austria.
