= Freideutsche Jugend =

Organisation of the German Youth Movement

The Freideutsche Jugend was an umbrella organisation established in Wilhelmine Germany that set out to create an autonomous youth culture free of adult supervision. It was part of the broader German youth movement, emerging from the Wandervogel.

== Origins ==
The organisation was set up at a gathering held on the Hoher Meissner, a mountain in Hesse, where several thousand youth gathered in October 1913 and formulated the Meissner Proclamation. In this they declared “Free German Youth, on their own initiative, under their own responsibility, and with deep sincerity, are determined to independently shape their own lives. For the sake of this inner freedom, they will take united action under any and all circumstances.” They adopted an anti-rational viewpoint and opposed Gustav Wyneken's Bund für freie Schulgemeinden.
