= Alexander Lion =

Co-founder of the German scout movement

Alexander Franz Anton Lion
- Born: 15 December 1870
- Died: 2 February 1962 (aged 91)

Alexander Franz Anton Lion (born 15 December 1870 – 2 February 1962) was the co-founder of the German Scout Movement.

== Early life ==
Lion was born in Berlin, the second son of six children in a Jewish banker's family. His parents were the merchant and banker Max Lion and Cäcilia Loeser. Between 1876 and 1880 he was privately tutored at home, after which he went to high school. At the age of 16, Lion left the Jewish community, and was later baptized a Catholic.

On 5 August 1889, Lion was awarded a bronze medal of the Order of Orange-Nassau after saving the life of a drowning boy.

He learnt French at high school and took additional private lessons to learn English. After leaving school he studied medicine at University in Würzburg, Berlin and Kiel.

At Easter 1893 Lion signed up as a volunteer in the Bavarian army. Between 1904 and 1906 he served as a surgeon during the Herero and Namaqua Genocide in German South-West Africa. While serving in South-West Africa he met the man with whom he would later go on to found the German branch of the Scout Movement, Maximilian Bayer.

== Founding of the German Scout Movement ==
In March 1908 Lion read an article in The Times entitled "Scouting as a Sport". This brought the founder of the Scout Movement, Robert Baden-Powell, to his attention, and later, in August that year, he began corresponding with Baden-Powell. Shortly after Lion wrote his first article about Scouting in the magazine "Ärztliche Rundschau".

During a month-long study tour of England in 1909, he spent three days in London with Baden-Powell. Following this meeting he set up the German Scout movement, writing the book "Das Pfadfinderbuch", (the Scouting book)., with Maximilian Bayer. In January 1909 "Jugendsport in Wald und Feld", a club to promote Scouting in Germany, was founded. Lion and Bayer were among the founding members. In 1912 "Das Pfadfinderbuch", was published in its 3rd edition as "Jungdeutschlands Pfadfinderbuch", which was a stronger German adaptation of Scouting for Boys than the two first editions. In 1911, the German federal Scouting organisation was set up, with Lion as a founding member.

The following year, Bayer, Lion and von Seckendorff helped Elise von Hopffgarten to write Pfadfinderbuch für junge Mädchen (the scouting book for young girls). Free of patriotic language and slogans, they wanted to make young women more independent.

Bayer, Lion and von Seckendorff were subject to attack from General von Jacobi, who accused them of, amongst other things, lacking in support for their country, King and religion. Jacobi created an anti-Semitic cartoon lampooning Lion, playing on Lion's Jewish birth, changing "Jungensport in Feld und Wald" (youth sports in field and forest) to "Judensport in Wald und Feld" (Jews' sports in forest and field), and calling Scouting supporter General Baschwitz a "vain Jewish man".

In 1913 Alexander Lion met Emmerich Teuber, an Austrian Scouting pioneer and later member of the International Committee of the World Organization of the Scout Movement, and the two Scout Leaders became friends.

== First World War ==
On the outbreak of the First World War, Lion became head physician at a field hospital, and worked to treat the wounded on the front lines, work for which he received the Prussian Iron Cross Class II. On 14 October 1915 he became the head physician for the 2nd Royal Bavarian Division. Serving in Lens, he rescued wounded and dying soldiers from the battlefield. For this work he received the Bavarian Merit Cross.

At the end of 1915, Lion was requested to help the German troops stationed in the Ottoman Empire. There he met Colmar Freiherr von der Goltz, who was a big supporter of the Scouting movement in Germany and Lion and Bayer. From April 1916 Lion was a doctor for the First Turkish Expedition Corps. However, in August of that year, Lion fell ill with dysentery. Later that year, in October, he was awarded the Ottoman War Medal for his work. A month later, he returned from the front line to Munich, where his family now lived.

In 1917 he returned to the Turkish front, later moving to the Romanian front, serving at Bukovina with the Royal Bavarian Cavalry Division. After the ceasefire on the Romanian front, he returned to France, serving at Reims and the Somme. Again he put himself at great personal risk to rescue the wounded, winning him the Iron Cross, Class I and the Bavarian Military Merit Cross, 3rd class with Swords. At the end of the war he was serving with the 39th Reserve Division in the Vosges.

== The Inter-War Period ==
After the war, Lion joined a volunteer division, Freikorps Epp, taking part in the dismantling of the Bavarian Soviet Republic. The last military rank he hold was that of a Generaloberarzt a.D.

After being demobbed from the army in 1921, Lion worked as a doctor at the spa resort of Oberhof. He was also chief of the German Red Cross in Gotha. From 1923 to 1926 he was an active member of the German Democratic Party.

The introduction of the Nuremberg Laws in 1935 saw Lion classified as a Jew and his civil rights suspended. In 1936 Alexander Lion became Honorary Scoutmaster of the Österreichischer Pfadfinderbund, which was the Austrian interdenominational member organization of World Scouting since 1922.

Even during the Third Reich, Lion remained in contact with his friends in the Scouts in other countries. When Austria was annexed by Germany at Anschluss, the Gestapo found incriminating documents, sparking a wave of arrests among Scouts. On 2 November 1938, Lion was arrested by the Gestapo and subjected to lengthy interrogations. On 19 November, he was moved to the Gestapo's headquarters. There he was put on trial, but, thanks to a skillful defence, he was sentenced to only 10 months for treason.

== The Second World War ==
Until 1942, Lion lived in Kolbermoor. However, he was then denounced by a supporter of the Nazi Party, but the Mayor personally secured his safety.

Lion's brother, Richard, and his wife, Beatrice, both died in the Bergen-Belsen concentration camp.

Lion's sister, Rosa, died in Vught concentration camp on 2 May 1943.

== After the Second World War ==
Immediately after the end of the war, Lion became the head of the Youth Office in Bad Aibling, using his position to build up the Federation of German Scouts, and in October 1948 he was appointed the honorary president of the organisation.

He became the driving force in the reconstruction of the Scouting movement, first in Bavaria, but later across the whole of Germany. With his involvement, the first Scout camp of the post-war period war held near Munich between 8 and 10 June 1946. In the same year, the Bavaria Federation of German Scouting was founded, with Lion as its honorary president. In July and August of the same year, a Scout camp was organised at the Chiemsee lake with groups attending from Munich, Cologne and Hesse. In 1948 he took part in an international Scout meeting in Mittenwald.

On 16 October 1946, Lion gave a lecture regarding the Scouting Movement on Radio Munich, giving the movement widespread publicity. In the same year he was officially recognised as a victim of persecution by the Nazi regime. Between 1946 and 1948 Lion was a member of the denazification court in Bad Aibling.

He became honorary president of the new founded Bund Deutscher Pfadfinder.

In August 1951 he took part in the 7th World Scout Jamboree at Bad Ischl, Austria.

Lion died on 3 February 1962.

He is buried in the cemetery in Fischach.

== See also ==
- Scouting in Germany
