= Erich Mönch =

German draughtsperson

- Born: July 10, 1905; Rötenbach bei Calw, German Empire
- Died: May 26, 1977 (aged 71); Unterjesingen bei Tübingen, Federal Republic of Germany
- Known for: Taught for 20 years at the State Academy of Fine Arts Stuttgart
- Awards: Order of Merit of the Federal Republic of Germany

Erich Mönch (July 10, 1905 in Rötenbach bei Calw – 26 May 1977 in Unterjesingen bei Tübingen) taught for 20 years at the State Academy of Fine Arts Stuttgart, was an important figure of Tübingen art scene after the Second World War, and after his retirement, he was an honorary member of the State Academy of Fine Arts Stuttgart. He received the Order of Merit of the Federal Republic of Germany in 1970 at retirement for his contribution to the development of lithography.

He also gave German Scouting substantial impetus. His career in Scouts began in 1921, with the Jugendbewegung im Bund der Wehrtempler. His brother Otto, who served in World War II as a lieutenant, led a group there, with Erich Mönch. This group attached in 1926 to the newly founded Bund der Sturmtrupp-Pfadfinder, of the Deutsche Waldritterschaft. Graphic artist Helmut Hövetborn was the Bundesfeldmeister. There was no written Scout bylaws, but the members had to know the key statements of the Federation. In 1927 they acquired the Bund bei Döffingen (Kreis Böblingen) a large heath area on a mountain. Here, in the "Land of Youth", the national office was in the blockhouse style. Mönch was national Hauptfeldmeister Chief Scout.

In 1929, he and Helmut Hövetborn founded the Sturmtrupp-Pfadfinder-die Reichspfadfinderschaft im Deutschen Guttemplerorden (IOGT). After the Bundesthing (general assembly) in Roßlau the name was changed in "Sturmtrupp-Pfadfinder, eine deutsche Waldritterschaft". Helmut Hövetborn and Erich Mönch became Chief Scouts.
