= Mopery =

English term for a minor offense

Mopery (/ˈmoʊpəri/) is a vague, informal name for minor offenses. The word is based on the verb to mope, which originally meant "to wander aimlessly"; it only later acquired the sense "to be bored and depressed". The word mope appears to have first been used in the 16th century, and appears in William Shakespeare's works. It has occasionally been put into use by police as a charge to bring when no other legitimate charge seems appropriate. It has also been used for satiric or comedic effect in books and films.

== Definitions ==
In 1970, in Columbus, Ohio, mopery was defined as "loitering while walking, or walking down the street with no clear destination or purpose", and was used by police to stop and interview counterculture "hippies" who were regarded as unsavory. In discussions of law, mopery is used as a placeholder name to mean some crime whose nature is not important to the problem at hand. This is sometimes expanded to "mopery with intent to creep" or "mopery with intent to gawk".

The word mopery has been used by authors Thomas Pynchon (Gravity's Rainbow) and Dashiell Hammett (The Thin Man), among others, for whom it is usually a comic accent. In Catch-22 (Joseph Heller, 1961), the mildly rebellious Cadet Clevinger is court-martialed by three angry officers, who accuse him of "breaking ranks while in formation, felonious assault, indiscriminate behavior, mopery, high treason, provoking, being a smart-guy, listening to classical music, and so on". Similarly, in the 1984 comedy film, Revenge of the Nerds, mopery is defined as "exposing yourself to a blind person". According to Russell Baker, "mopery isn't a crime, but only an old policemen's joke in which it's defined as the act of displaying yourself in the nude to a blind person."

== See also ==
- Idleness
- Flâneur
- Freeloading
- Slacker
- Vagrancy
- Vogelfrei
- Loitering
- Jaywalking
