= German Youth Movement =

German cultural and educational movement

The German Youth Movement (German: Die deutsche Jugendbewegung) is a collective term for a cultural and educational movement that started in 1896. It consists of numerous associations of young people that focus on outdoor activities. The movement included German Scouting and the Wandervogel. By 1938, 8 million children had joined associations that identified with the movement.

== Wandervogel ==
In 1896 the Wandervogel, a popular movement of youth groups who protested against industrialization, was founded in Berlin, and its members soon derived many vital concepts from the ideas of earlier social critics and Romantics, ideas that had extensive influence on many fields at the onset of the 20th century.

To escape the repressive and authoritarian German society at the end of the 19th century, its values increasingly transformed by industrialism, imperial militarism, as well as by British and Victorian influence, groups of young people searched for free space to develop a healthy life of their own away from the expanding cities. Expressing a romantic longing for a pristine state of things and older diverse cultural traditions, they turned to nature, confraternity and adventure. Soon the groups split and ever more organisations were founded, all still calling themselves Wandervogel, but organisationally independent.

The German Youth Movement remained a loose common movement rather than a single organisation. It was divided into several separate groups and federations, one of which was the Freideutsche Jugend, formed in 1913 as an umbrella association of several existing youth organisations.

== Bündische Jugend ==
After the First World War, the leaders returned disillusioned from the war. The same was true for leaders of German Scouting. Both movements started to influence each other heavily in Germany. From the Wandervogel came a stronger culture of hiking, adventure, bigger tours to farther places, romanticism and a younger leadership structure. Scouting brought uniforms, flags, more organisation, more camps and a clearer, more rational ideology. There was also an educationalist influence from Gustav Wyneken.

Together, this led to the emergence of the Bündische Jugend, a movement of many different youth associations. There were Wandervogel groups, Scouting associations and others, all of which mixed the elements described above with new ingredients. New styles and groups developed. A new tent form, the kohte, was introduced by Eberhard Koebel (aka "tusk"). Together with Koebel's interpretation of the yurt this type of tent is still the typical black tent used by German scouts on international scout camps to this day. The Deutsche Freischar and then the Jungenschaft was founded.

== Nazi Germany ==
In the German Youth Movement one can find all the different reactions of German society as a whole to the rise of the Nazis. Many welcomed it as a liberation movement to break free of the injustice of the Treaty of Versailles and to see Germany thrive once again. The notion of a 'Volksgemeinschaft', a people's community, was also popular. On the other hand, there were also many in the German Youth Movement who saw their associations as an elite superior to the more primitive Nazis. Some groups were genuinely democratic, or even left wing. Many more, even some of those who tended to the right, still wanted to carry on their independent work and existence as organisations. This led inescapably to a confrontation with the Nazi state, since the Nazi state did not allow any youth groups separate from the Hitler Youth, which itself adopted many of the outer forms of the Bündische Jugend after 1933. The groups remaining outside the Hitler Youth were outlawed and pursued, while some of them (e.g., the Edelweiss Pirates) tried to carry on.

One thing which might have been different from other sections of German society is the following: The Youth Movement was very idealistic, romantic and moral. Therefore, its members tended to take greater risks in following and acting upon their beliefs and persuasions. This might be the reason why one can find significant members of the Youth Movement on both sides, among the Nazis and among the Widerstand.

Examples for this are the following: Adolf Eichmann was one of their members from 1930 to 1931. Hans Scholl was a member of the Jungenschaft, an especially independent-minded association of the Bündische Jugend. Claus von Stauffenberg was a member of the Scout association of the Neupfadfinder, also an association of the Bündische Jugend.

== After the war ==
After the war many associations were refounded in West Germany, when the allies allowed it. In East Germany the Communist government did not allow it but instead outlawed all independent youth organisations. On the other hand, there were some connections between the German Youth Movement and the Free German Youth; within which a pioneer movement subunit, named the Thälmann Pioneers, existed for East German schoolchildren aged 6-14.

In West Germany the Youth Movement became strongly dominated by Scouting, although Wandervogel, Jungenschaft and other groups were also refounded. In contrast to the situation before the war, all groups tried to have a more rational ideology and declared their support of the new Basic Law. German Scouting also approached world Scouting (the World Organization of the Scout Movement and the World Association of Girl Guides and Girl Scouts) and was admitted to the world organisations for the first time.

== Today ==
Both the kibbutz and Bruderhof Communities can trace their origins to the German Youth Movement. The influence of Friedrich Nietzsche on the movement was substantial, with the philosopher described as the "Prophet of the German Youth Movement". Today there are still many groups and organisations which see themselves as part of this movement. German Scouting is still heavily influenced by this history, although the historical influence varies from group to group. The most distinctive features of German Scouting trace from this history.
