= Emmerich Teuber =

Emmerich Teuber (11 May 1877 in Prague-3 February 1943 in Vienna) began the first Scouting group in Vienna, Austria in 1912.

Teuber later served on the International Committee of the World Organization of the Scout Movement from its creation in 1922 until 1929.

Teuber died as a result of the sufferings he had endured in a concentration camp.
