= Deutsche Jungenschaft vom 1.11.1929 =

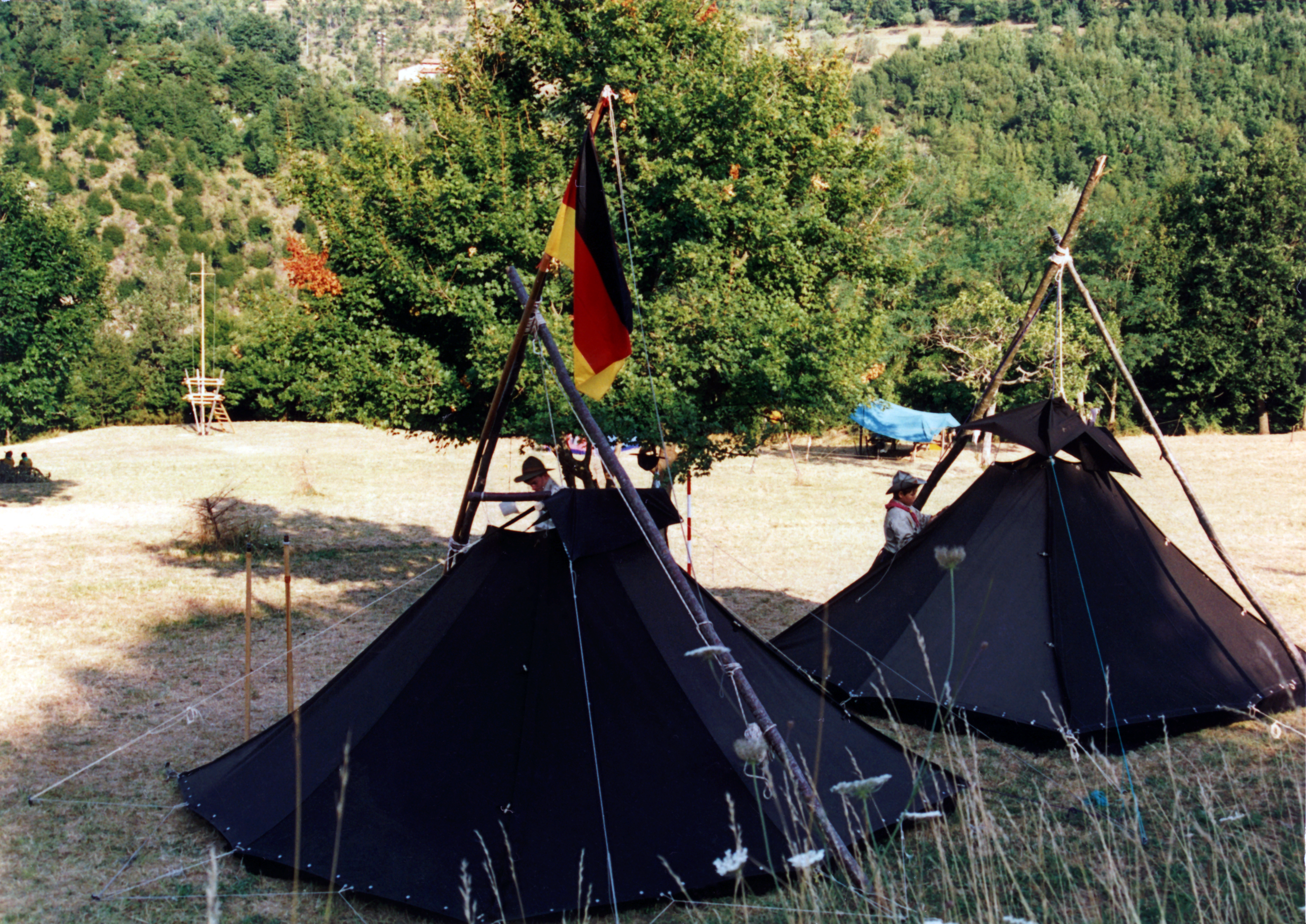
- The Kohte, the typical black tent of German Scouting
- Country: Germany
- Founded: 1 November 1929
- Founder: Eberhard Koebel

The Deutsche Jungenschaft vom 1.11.1929 (German Young Comrades of November 1, 1929) refers to a youth league founded by Eberhard Koebel, also known by his hiking name "tusk", which is also known as the German Young Comrades of 1.11.1929 and German Autonomous Young Comrades of 1.11.1929, primarily recognized by the abbreviation dj.1.11. Koebel rejected the prevalent principle of the "life community" in the German youth movement and established his league as a purely boys' league. The Young Comrades in this tradition view themselves as the third wave of the German youth movement after the Wandervogel and the German youth movement. However, many historians now categorize them as part of the German youth movement.

== Pre-War Youth Movements ==
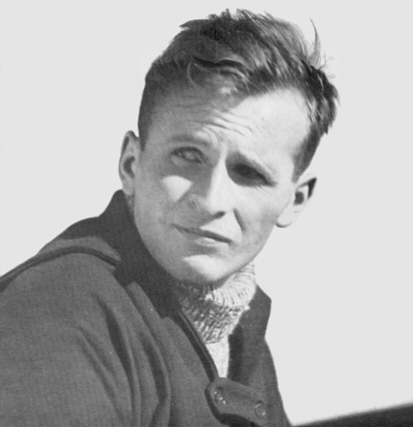
Eberhard Koebel

Eberhard Koebel founded the Deutsche Jungenschaft vom 1. 11. 1929 on November 1, 1929, as part of the Deutsche Freischar, as a "Revolt of the Boys" against the predominant Bundische influence, which focused on the concept of Lebensbund and thus ensured older members had a significant impact on the boys' groups.

Koebel introduced a new style of youth organizations with dj.1.11. He called for more commitment and engagement from the members and aimed to provide them with profound experiences, such as undertaking extreme trips and camps or having the "most heroic boys and leaders." He inspired the Nordic and Russian romanticism, still evident in contemporary Bundische Jugend (especially in their songs). dj.1.11 also introduced the Kohte, the yurt, and the Jungenschaftsbluse to the Bund youth.

Central to the identity of the Jungenschaft was the claim of complete independence. The boys were supposed to act as "self-seekers," creating new things themselves, rather than mere "repeaters," simply imitating what already existed. In line with this self-image, the Jungenschafts differed from other groups of their time in their focus on modernity and aesthetics, particularly influenced by Bauhaus.

From 1932 onwards, there was a gradual shift of some members, later followed by a multitude, towards the political left. Koebel himself joined the KPD (Communist Party of Germany) in 1932, at the same time stepping down from leading the Jungenschaft. His turn towards communism was met with resistance, leading to the dwindling of the organization to a few hundred members, with the "white" Jungentrucht breaking away.

In addition to these two larger groups, several smaller associations emerged in the early 1930s alongside dj.1.11, also identifying themselves as Jungenschaft. The group was founded within the Scouting movement by Eberhard Köbel on 1 November 1929. It demerged from the Deutsche Freischar after disagreements of the organisation's course.

== Excursus: culture ==
Youth movements shaped by dj.1.11's influence

Youth movements shaped by dj.1.11 understand themselves as a milieu strongly influenced by the culture nurtured in their youth groups (Horten). Given the central importance of this culture in describing youth movements, it is briefly outlined here using the example of the central youth association dj.1.11.

A central ritual of dj.1.11 was the Flag Guard, a meditative standing before the unfurled flag. Characteristic of dj.1.11 was also the rehearsal of chants. Stick fighting was seen as a field for practicing self-discipline. Banjo and Balalaika made their way into the youth movement through the Jungenschaft. An interesting aspect was the rehearsal of choir pieces (especially those of Russian origin), emphasizing discipline and community within the groups. The scenic dance with elaborate choreography was a fixed component of celebrations and camps. There were, as an exception for youth groups of that time, attempts at cinematic productions. In photography, the youth members were mainly inspired by modern Russian photographers. Following the Bauhaus movement, the principle of lowercase letters was adopted. After 1932, many youth group Horten, inspired by Koebel's monthly magazine "Die Kiefer," ("The Pine") engaged intensively with Asian philosophy and cultural practices. This engagement is seen as one of the roots of youth resistance against the National Socialists within the youth movement.

The attire of dj.1.11 consisted of a blue youth blouse, a cord (with the color indicating the role, such as group leader), and cloth trousers. A belt buckle featuring the association's coat of arms was introduced as a symbol of the association. The coat of arms depicts a falcon above three waves, with another symbol being the cherry blossom. Later youth associations partially adopted this attire, such as the German Jungenschaft. Some of them, like the Ordensjungenschaft, took new paths in this regard.

In the early 1930s, the cultural ideas of dj.1.11 reached a larger audience within the Bundische Jugend, as dj.1.11 extensively published and was represented by Eberhard Koebel and other leading members in the editorial boards of various "over-bund" magazines. The most notable among these are Das Lagerfeuer, Der Eisbrecher, and Die Kiefer.

== Illegality ==
The emerging Third Reich with its claim to absoluteness in youth work questioned the continued existence of independent boys' groups. Unlike other groups, dj.1.11 did not join the short-lived collective group Großdeutscher Bund. Instead, in the spring of 1933, dj.1.11 attempted to cooperate with the Reich Youth Leadership (RJF) and the Jungvolk of the Hitler Youth to enable the continuation of boys' community life within these structures. Jochen Hene, then Federal Leader, proposed to the RJF to form a 1000-member boys' group within the Jungvolk or to tolerate the boys' groups autonomously with their own badges. Following the example of Ludwigsburg where dj.1.11 groups had already merged into the Hitler Youth at the beginning of 1933, transfers to the Jungvolk took place throughout the year – some even encouraged by tusk; locally, this was dominated by dj.1.11. However, the initial successes were short-lived: Boys adhering to their ideals were interrogated, especially after tusk's arrest, some temporarily detained. House searches were also conducted, and those affected were either pushed out of the Jungvolk or left voluntarily.

Koebel himself was arrested by the Gestapo in Stuttgart on January 18, 1934, and taken to the Columbia-Haus in Berlin. After a suicide attempt on February 20, 1934, he was released from custody. The exact reasons for his arrest are not known, but it is documented that police surveillance of dj.1.11 began in 1932 due to Koebel's turn towards Communism, and upon his release, Koebel signed an obligation to refrain from further attempts to influence the Hitler Youth. Koebel emigrated to Britain via Sweden in the summer of 1934.

As the boys' community could no longer exist as a formal organization, efforts were made in the newspaper Die Kiefer and in Koebel's book Die Heldenfibel to ensure the continued existence of dj.1.11 as a community of like-minded individuals, a "spiritual order". The magazine and book were published by Verlag Günther Wolff in Plauen.

After 1933, the influence of autonomous boys' groups increased significantly. Members of other groups adopted styles, beliefs, and behaviors from dj.1.11. Besides the Nerother Wandervogel, it was mainly the influence of dj.1.11 that led the state to view the groups continuing the banned "Bündische Jugend" as the most dangerous political oppositional opponents.

Despite multiple bans, a variety of boys' groups persisted, with many members of groups falling under the category of dj.1.11 coming from other now-forbidden associations. Despite increasing attacks by the HJ (Hitler Youth) and state authorities over time, these boys' community gatherings continued, meetings were held where possible, and their culture was maintained.

Many of these groups sought primarily to ensure their continued existence in the early stages of the Third Reich. As experiences with the Nazi regime unfolded, some groups shifted towards active resistance: in several cities, in collaboration with other groups, HJ members were attacked, sometimes leading to street battles with the HJ. In some places, resistance went as far as smuggling people out of the country and engaging in sabotage, especially during the war. Contacts were maintained with various resistance circles at home and abroad, including Karl Otto Paetel in Paris.

Several members influenced by dj.1.11 who participated in active resistance were executed by resistance groups, including Hans Scholl (originally dj.1.11 Ulm - Trabanten), Willi Graf (originally Deutschmeister-Jungenschaft) - although not related to their boys’ community membership - and Helle Hirsch (originally dj.1.11 Stuttgart - Horte Helmut Haug, schnipp). Others were imprisoned in concentration camps and penitentiaries or met their deaths during the war in so-called probation units.

dj.1.11 was described as the "probably most important group for the formation of the counter-cultural milieu". However, some former members of boys' groups turned to National Socialism.

== Influence ==
The dj.1.11 group had significant impact on the German youth movement and on German scouting.

Deutsche Jungenschaft influenced members of the resistance group, The White Rose in Nazi Germany, which called for active opposition to German dictator Adolf Hitler's regime.

The archetypical tent of German Scouting, the Kohte, was developed within the dj.1.11.

== Post-war youth movements ==
Following an arrest operation in 1937/38, the contact between the remaining genuine dj.1.11 groups in Germany or former members and Eberhard Koebel in Great Britain was severed. Nevertheless, the Gestapo pursued anything that could somehow be associated with dj.1.11. After the end of the war and the Nazi regime, former dj.1.11 members in various cities (e.g., Cologne, Minden, Wuppertal, Kiel, and Ludwigsburg) revived groups. An example of this is the group reestablished by Michael Jovy in Cologne. During his time in hiding, Michael Jovy was sentenced to six years in prison for continuing the bündische Jugend, and his group was oriented against any continuation of the Hitler Youth even after the war.

One of these reestablishments was the Göttinger Jungenschaft founded in 1946 by Walter Scherf (Fahrtenname tejo). Like many new formations, this group was mainly composed of former members of the Jungvolk, leading to a long-lasting rejection of these groups by Jungenschaft circles rooted in resistance against the Nazis.

In 1946, some of these groups – referred to as Horten – (Bremen, Göttingen, Hildesheim, Lüneburg, Verden/Aller, Wolfenbüttel, and Hanover) united to form the Deutsche Jungenschaft. Walter Scherf was elected as the Bundesführer at the turn of 1948/1949. However, he stepped down in mid-1949. The organization was then continued by Michael Jovy, Hans-Jochen Zenker, and Gerhard Rasche. In 1951, Klaus-Jürgen Citron founded the Neue Deutsche Jungenschaft out of the Deutsche Jungenschaft, but this new creation was not widely supported by most leaders of the Deutsche Jungenschaft and did not last long. Subsequently, in 1951, Jovy, Zenker, and Rasche registered the name deutsche jungenschaft as a club to protect the name. In 1954, among the newly formed Southern Kreis of the Deutsche Jungenschaft led by Hanno Trurnit-Berkenhoff were Horten in Munich, Erlangen, Göppingen, and Ettenheim.

In 1951, Horten from Ludwigsburg, Stuttgart, Göppingen, Esslingen, Plochingen, and Winterbach came together in the Jungenschaft Schwaben led by Hermann Siefert (Teja). It later merged with the Jungenschaft der Burg (based at Burg Waldeck in the Hunsrück).

In 1953, Johannes Ernst Seiffert founded the dj.1.11-Bund, considered as an "orthodox" heir to Koebel's dj.1.11 and more focused than other Jungenschaften on traditional forms and content, particularly on the worldview presented in Koebel's "Heldenfibel".

Additionally, new formations or continuations of old groups existed as autonomous Horten and Horten rings such as the Kartell deutscher Jungenschaften founded on November 1, 1959, and the dj.1.11-hortenring in the Rhine/Ruhr area (joined the dj.1.11-Bund in 1963).

The Bund deutscher Jungenschaften – BdJ, emerging in 1960 from the Jungentrucht and Jungenschaft im Bund (consisting of parts of the Deutsche Freischar, Gefährtenschaft, and Neue Deutsche Jungenschaft established in 1954), was more aligned with the pre-1933 Deutsche Freischar than the prewar Jungenschaft. The BdJ saw itself as a contemporary and versatile association and exerted significant influence beyond its borders, particularly during the Meißnerlager in 1963. Five members of the Munich Horte of the BdJ inadvertently triggered the Schwabing riots with their Russian Fahrten songs, contributing to Munich's history. The BdJ opened its doors to girls and adults, even forming mixed groups. While there were girls in groups of the dj.1.11-Bund, all other post-war youth movements retained the idea of an all-boys association.

In the 1950s and 1960s, especially in southwest Germany, young people formed Jungenschaft groups within the framework of evangelical community work. The most prominent among them was the deutsche evangelische jungenschaft (d.e.j.; also d.e.j.58) with a focus in North Baden, which existed until the 1970s.

== Present ==
Today, there are still a few, numerically not very strong, youth groups that see themselves to varying degrees in the tradition of dj.1.11. These youth groups particularly emphasize the goal of "self-striving," as programmatically formulated by Koebel in the "Tense Bow." Current groups place different degrees of emphasis on aspects of past youth ideals: While the German youth association founded in 1990 (until 1996 with the additional name Neubund) strongly resembled the pre-war dj.1.11 in its appearance and intellectually drew more on the approaches of the post-war youth movement by Michael Jovy and Walter Scherf, the Order Youth particularly emphasized a modernized version of the Order concept advocated by dj.1.11. The grey youth group tries to form a symbiosis between youth group ideas and the Grey Corps. Other groups, like the Free Youth Group, emphasize left-wing political action, which found expression, among other things, in the occupation of an oil platform in the Wadden Sea.

In some associations, such as the German Freischar, the German Pathfinder Association, or the Pathfinder Association Crusaders, the term "youth group" is used to refer to groups or age levels.

Even in the church context, especially in Protestant youth work and in the YMCA, the term "youth group" has been retained for boys' groups. However, these groups mostly have different roots than dj.1.11. In addition, there are some Christian (mostly Protestant) youth associations that see themselves quite in the tradition of dj.1.11. Critics, however, argue that a confessional affiliation is not in line with the autonomy ideal of dj.1.11.

In June 1988, former members of some post-war youth associations such as the German Youth Association e.V. and the Federation of German Youth Groups met in Minden and decided to establish an open circle of older members, the Minden Circle. Since then, the Minden Circle has held an open meeting every June at various locations. The Minden Circle closely collaborates with the Archive of the German Youth Movement at Burg Ludwigstein, where a part of Eberhard Koebel's estate is also located.
