= Deutscher Pfadfinderbund (1945) =

- Abbreviation: DPB
- Country: Germany
- Founded: 1945
- Founder: Walther Jansen
- Affiliation: Ring junger Bünde
- Website deutscher-pfadfinderbund.de

The Deutscher Pfadfinderbund (1945) (DPB) is an independent, interdenominational German Scout association and is a member of the Ring junger Bünde (Ring of Youth Societies). It was founded in 1945 by Walther Jansen and Ebbo Plewe and consists of a boy section, a girl section, the Order of St. George on the youth section and the Order of St. Christopher, and is a purely voluntary organization.
