= Wandervogel =

German youth movement

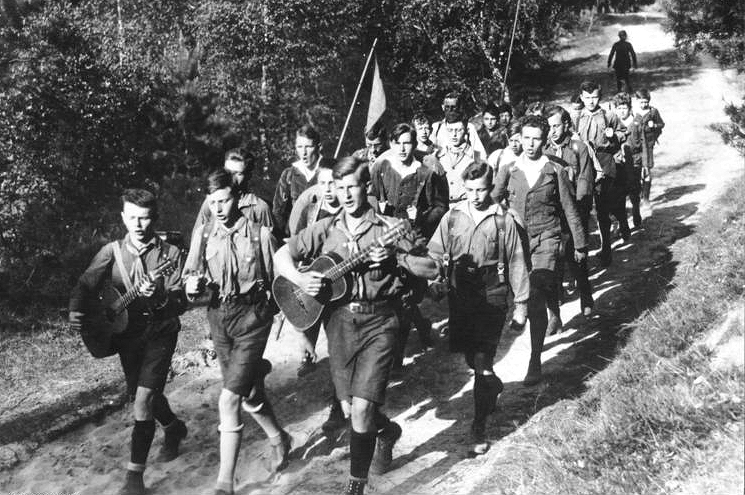
Group from Berlin c. 1930

Wandervogel (pl. Wandervögel; lit. 'Wandering Bird') is the name adopted by a popular movement of German youth groups from 1896 to 1933, who protested against industrialization by going to hike in the country and commune with nature in the woods. Drawing influence from medieval wandering scholars, their ethos was to revive old Teutonic values, with a strong emphasis on German nationalism. According to historians, a major contribution of the Wandervögel was the revival of folk songs in wider German society.

The movement was divided into three main national groups: the Alt-Wandervogel, the Wandervogel eingetragener Verein (WVEV) and the Jung-Wandervogel. While the first two were generally respectful of traditions (family, the military, the school), the Jung-Wandervogel was more defiant and closer to revolutionary ideas. Wandervögel spontaneously emerged outside of authority controls, and recruited their members through selection and co-option.

Wandervogel was the dominant trend in the German Youth Movement between 1901 and 1913. From 100 members in 1901, they numbered 25,000 to 40,000 adherents in 1914. At its height, the movement had 60,000–80,000 members, with 45,000 in the WVEV alone. The name, referring to a magical, free and weightless bird, can be translated either as a "bird of passage", or as a "wandering bird", slightly different in meaning from the Zugvogel ("migratory bird").

== History ==
=== Origin (1895–1900) ===
In the autumn of 1895, a law student named Hermann Hoffmann-Fölkersamb (1875–1955) received permission from the director of the Steglitz Gymnasium to offer free stenography classes. By 1896, these classes included walks around Steglitz, and in 1897 the group undertook a 15-day hike through the Harz highlands. The small gathering soon grew in size, organizing a trek in the Rhine region in 1898 with 11 participants, followed in 1899 by a four-week excursion in Bohemia with around 20 schoolboys. Even in these early outings, the core elements of the future Wandervogel were already apparent: an emphasis on the group's independence and a frugal way of life, a rejection of traditional authority, a scorn for tourist-friendly, well-marked trails, and a disregard for the comforts offered by youth hostels.

=== First Wandervogel (1901–1904) ===
The Wandervogel was officially founded on November 4, 1901, by Karl Fischer (1881–1941) in Steglitz—a suburb of Berlin—under the name "Wandervogel Committee for Schoolboy Excursions" (Wandervogel, Ausschuß für Schülerfahrten). Fischer formed the committee with four of his friends, along with four local writers and a physician. This group functioned as a legal and financial sponsor, but they did not participate in the movement's activities, which were directed by Fischer himself under the title Oberbachant. At the time, Prussian law prohibited young people from establishing their own clubs or joining extracurricular groups. Fischer therefore presented the new association to parents and Prussian authorities as a respectable hiking club. A former teacher at the Steglitz Gymnasium, the reform pedagogue Ludwig Gurlitt (1855–1931), helped secure official recognition from the Prussian Ministry of Culture by submitting a positive report. Fischer had been a devoted follower of Hoffmann-Fölkersamb, his right-hand man on numerous treks, and he eventually assumed leadership when Hoffmann-Fölkersamb left Berlin at the end of 1899 to pursue a diplomatic career in Constantinople. After failing his Abitur (school-leaving exams) twice, Fischer had to wait until 1901 to devote himself fully to the movement, at the expense of his studies in law and Sinology. By 1903, Wandervogel groups had already formed in Berlin, Posen, Munich, Hamburg and Lüneburg, and they were regularly organizing hikes.

The Wandervögel quickly rose to prominence as the leading German youth movement. Rooted in a back-to-nature philosophy, the group championed freedom, self-reliance, and a spirit of adventure. Before long, however, it also adopted a nationalist tone, emphasizing Germany's Teutonic heritage. Walter Laqueur indicates that the name was discovered by one of the founders—Wolf Meyen—in an inscription on a tombstone: "Wer hat euch Wandervögeln / die Wissenschaft geschenkt / dass ihr auf Land und Meeren / die Flügel sicher lenkt" ("Who granted you, wandering birds / the knowledge / so that over land and sea / you guide your wings so surely?"). Drawing influence from medieval wandering students, the newcomers were named "Scholars" and the proven ones "Bachant". Fischer introduced new manners such as the greeting "Heil", inspired by Austrian German students; musical instruments were carried out during hikes, especially the lute guitar, alongside clothing, food, and a "hiking stick".

=== Divisions and expansion (1904–1913) ===
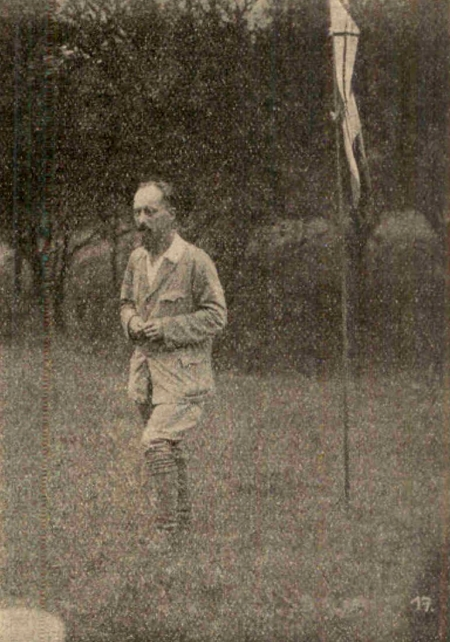
Karl Fischer

In June 1904, opposition led by Siegfried Copalle grew against Karl Fischer in the original Wandervogel group. They debated on social issues: abstinence from alcohol and tobacco, and if females should be allowed to join the movement as equals. As a result, the Copalle group became the Wandervogel-Steglitz, presided by Ludwig Gurlitt, while followers of Fischer founded the Alt-Wandervogel. The Wandervogel-Steglitz banned alcohol from excursions and removed the Oberbachant position in order to establish a collegial direction (Führerkollegium). It was geographically limited to the surroundings of Berlin and in 1912, the year of its dissolution, it had only 200 "members", along with 440 students who participated in the group's activities.

The Alt-Wandervogel saw itself as the only legitimate inheritor of the original movement, as it was under the responsibility of Karl Fischer, now Großbachant. But after a new leadership crisis emerged in 1905, Fischer left both the movement and Germany during the following year. He eventually came back to his home country only 15 years later. After his departure, the Alt-Wandervögel quickly abandoned the previous authoritarian structure centered around Fischer to adopt an organization closer to the Steglitz group's. It experienced from then on a strong rise in membership.

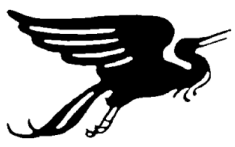
Emblem of the Wandervogel eingetragener Verein (WVEV)

In 1907, a new crisis broke out in the Alt-Wandervogel, led by another opponent of alcohol, Ferdinand Vetter from Jena. The Vetter group eventually seceded to found the Wandervogel, Deutscher Bund für Jugendwandern (WVDB). Largely decentralized, the autonomous structures were connected via annual meetings and a common magazine. The Wandervogel DB was endorsed by cultural groups like the Dürerbund, and by German pro-temperance leagues. This wing was particularly active in the publication of folk song collections. They also tried to reunite the different Wandervogel wings under a common agenda of alcohol prohibition, the admission of girls, and the enlargement of membership to primary school students and apprentices. After several compromises—notably the autonomy of each group in the application of policies, comparable to the situation of German states in the Empire—they eventually succeeded in creating the Wandervogel eingetragener Verein, Bund für deutsches Jugendwandern (WVEV) at the end of 1912. The WVEV was joined by the Wandervogel-Steglitz in December 1912, by the WVDB in January 1913, as well as two-thirds of the Alt-Wandervögel.

The Alt-Wandervögel who chose to remain claimed to represent the tradition of Fischer, by refusing any compromise with the adult world. By 1914, they numbered 4,400 adherents, and 6,000 Scholaren. While reminding the "German nature of the Wandervogel", they let each group decide on the question of Jewish membership; the WVEV applied the same policy. In 1912, a Jewish girl was refused membership in Zittau because, it was argued, the Wandervogel was a "German movement" that had no use for a Jew. One Wandervogel newspaper, Führer Zeitung, asserted that "the Wandervogel is neither a depository for old boots formerly worn by flat-footed [Jews] and stinking of garlic nor is it an object of speculation for Jewish enterprises." The readings of Paul de Lagarde, Julius Langbehn, and Houston Stewart Chamberlain were also standard among Wandervögel.

By 1910, some directors of the Alt-Wandervogel had denounced the homosexuality of their colleague Wilhelm Jansen, who eventually seceded to create the Jung-Wandervogel split group in the same year. This was the smallest of the three main Wandervogel wings, with 2,300 members in 1913. They attacked in their rhetoric the "mentally constricting" adult institutions, claiming that the purpose of the Wandervögel was to allow young people to "discuss all their wishes and values" without the interference of adults. Influenced by Hans Blüher, they dismissed the movement as too conformist and respectable, considering it had lost its soul. This situation was caused in their views by the growing influence of adults via the Council of parents and friends (Eufrat), the interventions of teachers in their activities, and a rise in membership that had become out of control. The Freideutsche Jugend was founded on Hoher Meissner in October 1913 on the basis of autonomy from adult supervision.

The Jung-Wandervögel also became known for the prevailing homosexuality in their ranks. According to historian Peter Stachura however, if male eroticism "did play some part in the ordinary day-to-day life of the Wandervögel, [...] it would be misleading to conclude on this account that the Wandervogel was a predominantly homo-erotic movement".

=== WWI and after (1914–1933) ===
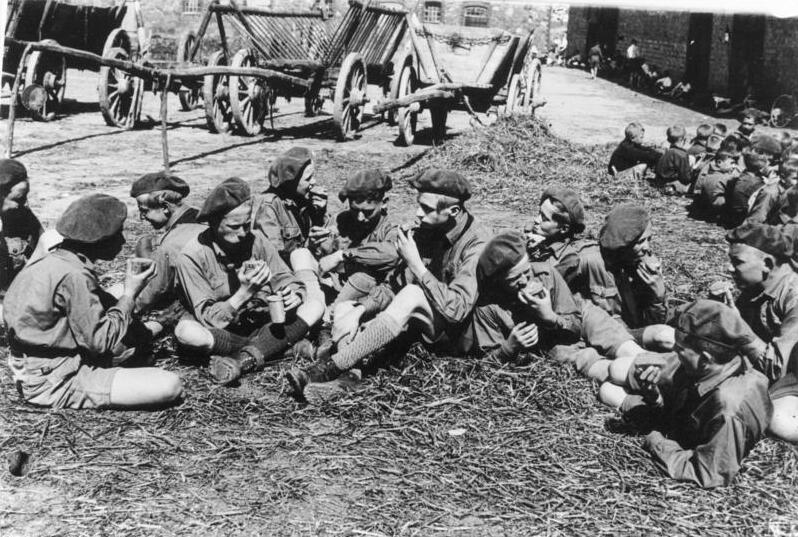
Wandervögel in 1931

=== After the Nazi seizure of power ===
From 1933, the Nazis outlawed the Wandervogel, German Scouting, the Jungenschaft, and the Bündische Jugend, along with most youth groups independent of the Hitler Youth. Only Church-affiliated groups survived, lasting until almost 1936.

=== Austria and Switzerland ===
The Austrian wing, Österreichischer Wandervogel (ÖWV), was established in 1909 by a student from Prague, Hans Moutschka, following first contacts between the Austrian youth and German Wandervögel in Bohemia by 1906. Recruited within the Austrian bourgeoisie, its members were known for their violent rhetoric, and defended German nationalism against the perceived threat of pan-Slavism in Austria-Hungary.

Another branch was created in Switzerland in 1906-1907 after a meeting with German students opposed to alcohol, the Schweizerischer Wandervogel (SWV). They had 50 members at their launch in April 1908, and around 1,500 members in 1913. The Swiss movement had a limited impact, and was essentially composed of young German-speaking Protestants from the bourgeoisie.

=== Japan ===
Before World War II, in a context of cordial relations with Germany, and in an effort to promote healthy activities for young people throughout the country, Japan's Ministry of education launched the movement among Japanese universities, calling it the Health Promotion Wandervogel Association (奨健会ワンダーフォーゲル部, Shōkenkai Wandāfōgeru-bu). The first WanderVogel student club was created in 1935 in Rikkyo University. It then spread to Keio University and Meiji University, and from 1937 on to several other universities around the country, especially after World War II, in the context of high economic growth and popularization of mountaineering.

== Sociology ==
The movement was mostly based on the German Protestant middle class, attracting only a few working-class and aristocrat members. Boys and girls were allowed to join, although this caused some controversy among leaders, and the introduction of sex segregation in the movement activities. Members were between 12 and 18 years old.

The regions with the largest concentration of Wandervögel were Silesia, Saxony, Thuringia, Hesse, Westphalia, Rhineland; and to a lesser extent Baden. They were largely present in Protestant regions; nearly 80% of the cities hosting a Wandervogel group in 1912 had a strong Protestant majority. Most of those locations were not densely populated and industrialized centres of life, but rather belonged to the rural and traditional part of Germany, with small and medium cities, residential suburbs, university cities, and capitals of small principalities.

The Wandervögel seem to have started an anti-authoritarian rebellion against German society at large, with their focus on the youth values in opposition to the adult ones. The movement was born in Steglitz, a middle-class residential neighbourhood of Berlin. Far from the agitation of the city centre and the working-class districts, young students wanted to escape the social constraints of their environment, which was built on traditional and hierarchical social ranks influencing relations with their parents and the adult society, rather than on poor material conditions. However, the Wandervogel was not a revolutionary movement in the real sense of the term, as they simply withdrew from society in order to carry out their activities in isolation during a few days or a whole summer, before returning to their usual life during the remaining part of the year. Although it could promote anarchist or nihilistic ideas at the margins, especially in the Jung-Wandervogel, most of the Wandervögel essentially sought to be seen as a respectable movement in wider society.

== Influence ==
Some authors have seen the ethos and activities of the Wandervögel as an influence on later social movements, in particular the hippie movement which developed in the United States during the 1960s.

== See also ==
- Edelweiss Pirates
- Flâneur
- Mopery
- Vogelfrei
